= William Street tunnel =

Railway tunnel in Perth

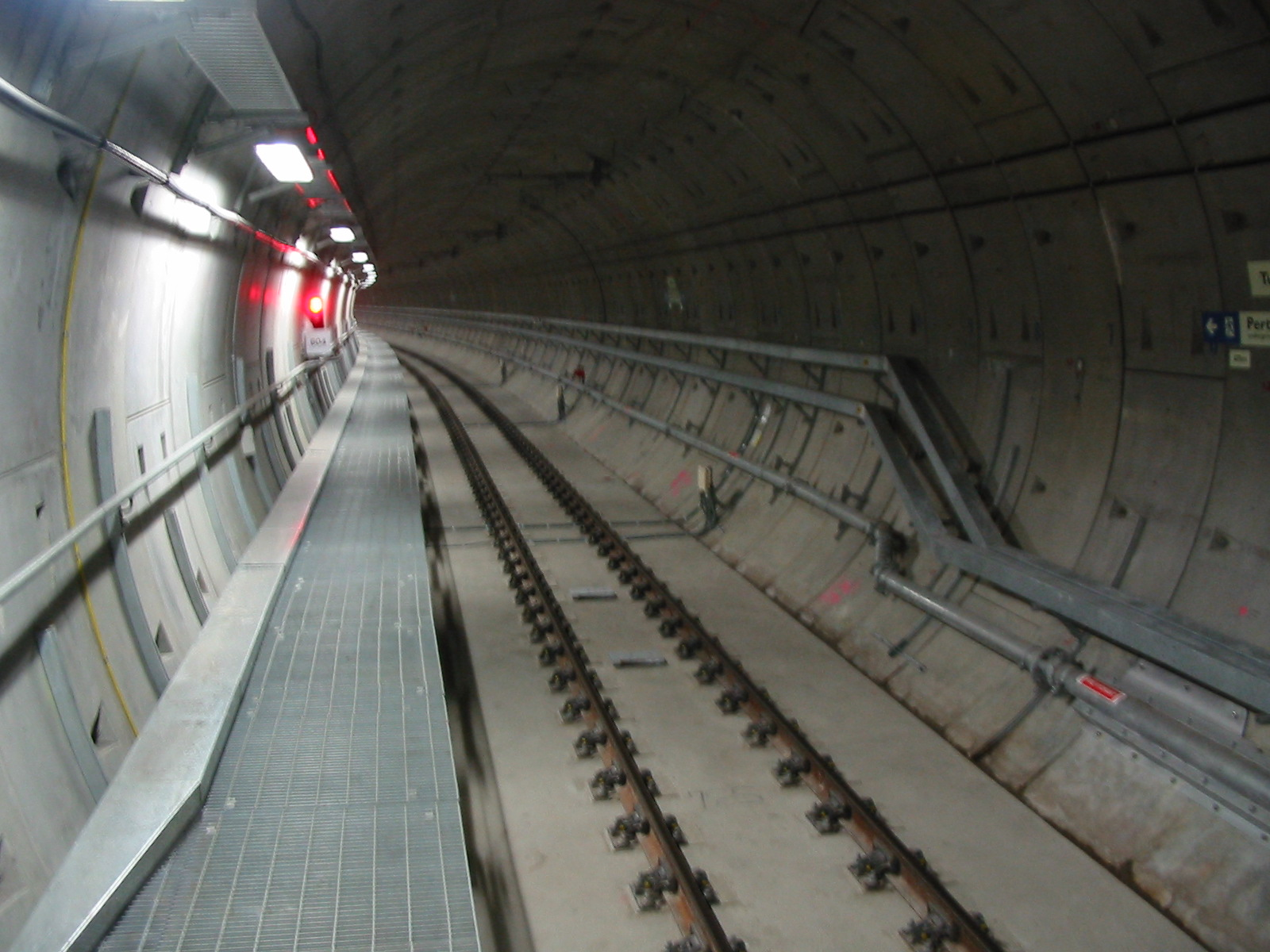
- View facing north from Elizabeth Quay station

Overview
- Line: Mandurah and Yanchep
- Location: Perth, Western Australia
- System: Transperth
- No. of stations: 2

Operation
- Work began: February 2004
- Opened: 15 October 2007
- Owner: Public Transport Authority
- Operator: Public Transport Authority

Technical
- Length: 770 m (2,530 ft) (bored tunnel)
- Track gauge: 1,067 mm (3 ft 6 in) narrow gauge
- Electrified: 25 kV 50 Hz AC from overhead catenary
- Operating speed: 50 km/h (31 mph)

The William Street tunnel is a railway tunnel under the central business district of Perth, Western Australia. It was built between 2004 and 2007 as part of the construction of the Mandurah line, which it connects with the Yanchep line, running under William Street for much of its length. It consists of 770 metres (2,530 ft) of twin bored tunnels, a cut-and-cover tunnel at either end, and two stations: Perth Underground and Elizabeth Quay.

The Mandurah line was initially proposed to branch off the Armadale line. After a more direct route was chosen in 2001, a tunnel under the central business district became necessary to connect the Mandurah line to the rest of the network. The construction of the Mandurah line was divided into eight contract packages; the William Street tunnel was part of Package F, also known as the City Project, the contract for which was awarded to Leighton–Kumagai Gumi in February 2004 for A$324.5 million. Preliminary works began the same month, and tunnelling began in October 2005, starting from Elizabeth Quay station and heading north. Boring for the first tunnel was completed in June 2006, after which the tunnel boring machine was transported back to Elizabeth Quay to dig the second, which was completed in October 2006.

Construction was disrupted by industrial action, which culminated in the prosecution of 107 workers for illegally striking in February and March 2006 following the issuance of a strike ban by the Australian Industrial Relations Commission. The strikes, along with complications involving heritage protection at Perth Underground station, engineering challenges on the Swan River foreshore, and contract disputes, resulted in the tunnel's opening being delayed beyond its 2006 deadline. The first train entered the tunnel in August 2007 and it opened to passengers on 15 October, ahead of the rest of the Mandurah line's opening on 23 December. The final cost, after contract disputes were settled, was $439.3 million.

== Description ==
The William Street tunnel consists of 770 metres (2,530 ft) of twin bored tunnels, plus a cut-and-cover tunnel at each end, whereby a trench is dug and covered to form the tunnel. (Note: The 2002 master plan gave a length of 690 metres (2,260 ft) for the twin bored tunnels, 648 metres (2,126 ft) of cut-and-cover tunnel between the freeway and Esplanade station, 310 metres (1,020 ft) of cut-and-cover tunnel between Esplanade station and the Roe Street dive structure, and nearly 200 metres (660 ft) of ramp at the northern portal.) The tunnel has two stations: Perth Underground, which was known during construction as William Street station, and Elizabeth Quay station, which was known before 2016 as Esplanade station. The tunnel is part of the Yanchep line (Note: The Yanchep line was known as the Joondalup line before 15 June 2024.) north of Perth Underground and the Mandurah line south of Elizabeth Quay, the section between these two stations being shared by both lines. The bored tunnels have an internal diameter of 6.16 metres (20 ft 3 in), with 275-millimetre-thick (10.8 in) lining, and the rails range from 9 to 21 metres (30 to 69 ft) below ground level. The tunnel has a design life of 120 years.

The southern cut-and-cover portion, measuring approximately 648 metres (2,126 ft), commences east of the Mitchell Freeway along the Swan River foreshore, and ends at the intersection of Mounts Bay Road and William Street, where Elizabeth Quay station is. North of the station, the tunnel runs under William Street as two bored tunnels, one for each track. The tunnels curve east of William Street to reach Perth Underground station, which was dug cut-and-cover. The bored tunnels then bend west to enter the rail corridor west of Perth station, on the site of the former Perth Marshalling Yard, where the bored tunnels end. A 200-metre (660 ft) ramp parallel to Roe Street takes the tracks to the surface, where they connect with the rest of the rail network. This was not originally part of the tunnel, but the ramp was covered as part of the Perth City Link in the 2010s. The minimum curve radius for the tunnel is 135 metres (443 ft) due to geometric constraints, far below the minimum curve radius of 700 metres (2,300 ft) used elsewhere on the Mandurah line.

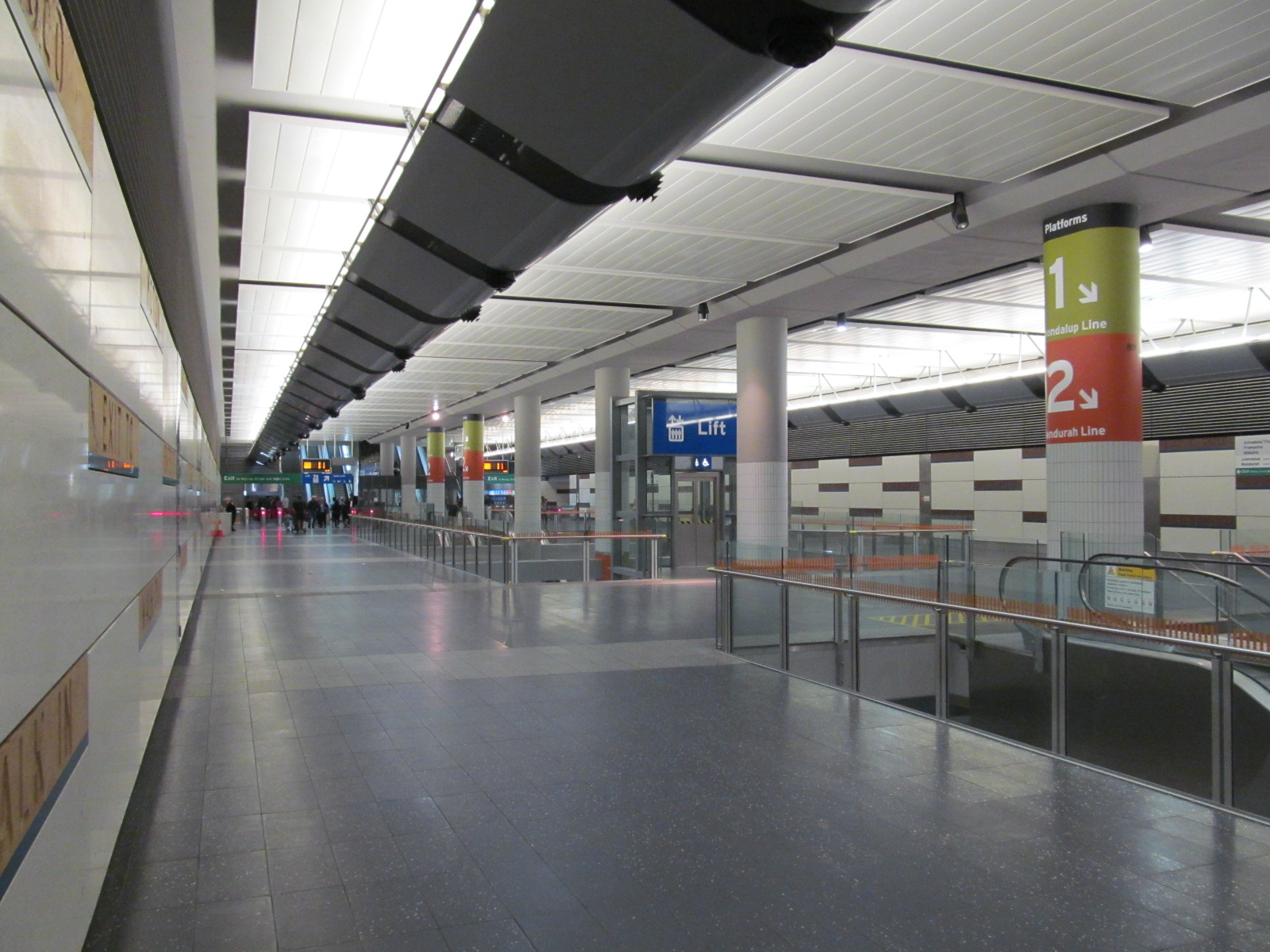
Perth Underground station

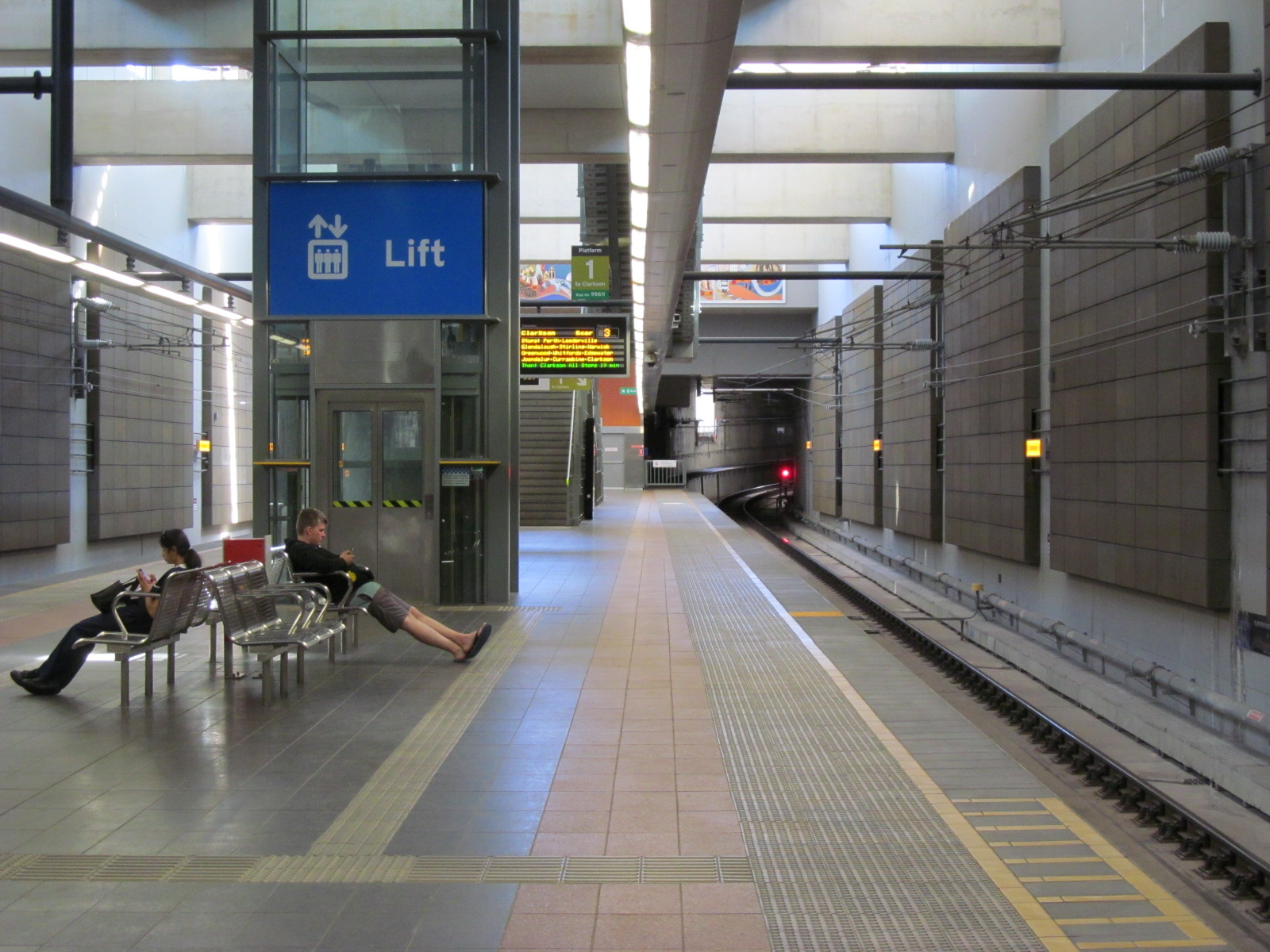
Elizabeth Quay station

== Planning ==
Initial plans for the Mandurah line, created by a Liberal state government, proposed it branch off the Armadale line at Kenwick, which did not require a tunnel through Perth's central business district (CBD). Experts, including Murdoch University professor Peter Newman, called for a direct route to be constructed instead, which would have necessitated a tunnel through the CBD. The Labor Party supported the Kenwick route in the lead up to the 2001 state election, but after Labor's election victory, the new Cabinet of Western Australia decided in July 2001 to construct the direct route instead. The new tunnel was to be a cut-and-cover tunnel along William Street, with an elevated portion south of St Georges Terrace, which was strongly criticised by the lord mayor of Perth, Peter Nattrass, who said the elevated section would be an "eyesore" like the Cahill Expressway in Sydney. The minister for planning and infrastructure, Alannah MacTiernan, tried to allay his fears by leaving open the possibility that the tunnelled section would extend further south than St Georges Terrace.

Routes shortlisted by the Perth City Rail Advisory Committee in March 2002: The western route (left), central route (middle), and eastern route (right).

In response to criticism of the Mandurah line's route through the CBD, the Perth City Rail Advisory Committee was formed in October 2001 to assess other options. The committee consisted of eight members, including engineers, planners, and representatives from the Property Council and the Perth City Council. Tasked with submitting its report in February 2002, it was delayed as the committee struggled to reach a consensus; it was released on 14 March 2002. The report assessed sixteen options, of which three were shortlisted:

- The western route runs along the Mitchell Freeway, exiting the freeway median strip via a tunnel south of Malcolm Street, before bending east to surface in the existing rail corridor, terminating at Perth station. There would be an underground station at Elder Street between Hay and Murray streets, near Parliament House. The estimated cost of the western route was A$140.1 million. This option required reversing trains at Perth station to retain through-running with the Joondalup line, necessitating another train costing $18 million. This was the committee's second-most-preferred route.
- The central route runs in a cut-and-cover tunnel along William Street, bending west to connect with the Joondalup line. There would be two underground stations at William Street, the first near the Esplanade Busport and the second between Murray and Wellington streets, with a pedestrian connection to the existing Perth station. This route differs from the government's proposed route in that the line runs underground south of The Esplanade instead of being elevated. The estimated cost of this option was $139 million. This was the committee's least preferred route, because of the disruption caused by the cut-and-cover construction.
- The eastern route runs in a bored tunnel parallel to Mounts Bay Road and The Esplanade, before bending north to run along Irwin Street, then bending west to reach Perth station. There would be underground stations at the Esplanade Busport and Irwin Street near Hay Street. The estimated cost of this option was $311 million. This was the committee's preferred route. They also considered a route which involved tunnelling under St Georges Terrace instead of along Mounts Bay Road and The Esplanade; the committee ruled this out for its high cost, risks, and the disruption that constructing a station there would cause to St Georges Terrace.

The state government ruled out the eastern route as it would cost more than twice the other routes. The remaining two routes were opened up to public consultation over the following month. The western route was the Perth City Council's preferred route, due to its limited impact on businesses. That route would cause disruption to the Mitchell Freeway during its construction and integrate poorly with the surrounding area. In April 2002, the Perth City Rail Advisory Committee was re-established to conduct a more detailed analysis of the two remaining routes, with the central route to be considered as a bored tunnel rather than cut-and-cover. An opinion poll published by The West Australian newspaper found that 39 per cent of respondents supported the central route and 35 per cent of respondents supported the western route. The Perth City Rail Advisory Committee completed its second report in May 2002, which recommended the central route. State Cabinet endorsed this route in June, with Nattrass now in support. A master plan for the Mandurah line's direct route was released in August 2002.

== Procurement ==
The construction of the tunnel was known as the City Project, which was designed and constructed as part of Package F of the Southern Suburbs Railway, the name for the Mandurah line during construction. Construction was managed by New MetroRail, a division of the Public Transport Authority (PTA). Geotechnical testing by Golder Associates occurred between January and March 2003. Expressions of interest for Package F were called for in March 2003 and closed in April 2003. Five consortia submitted expressions of interest for the contract, which was valued at $200 million.

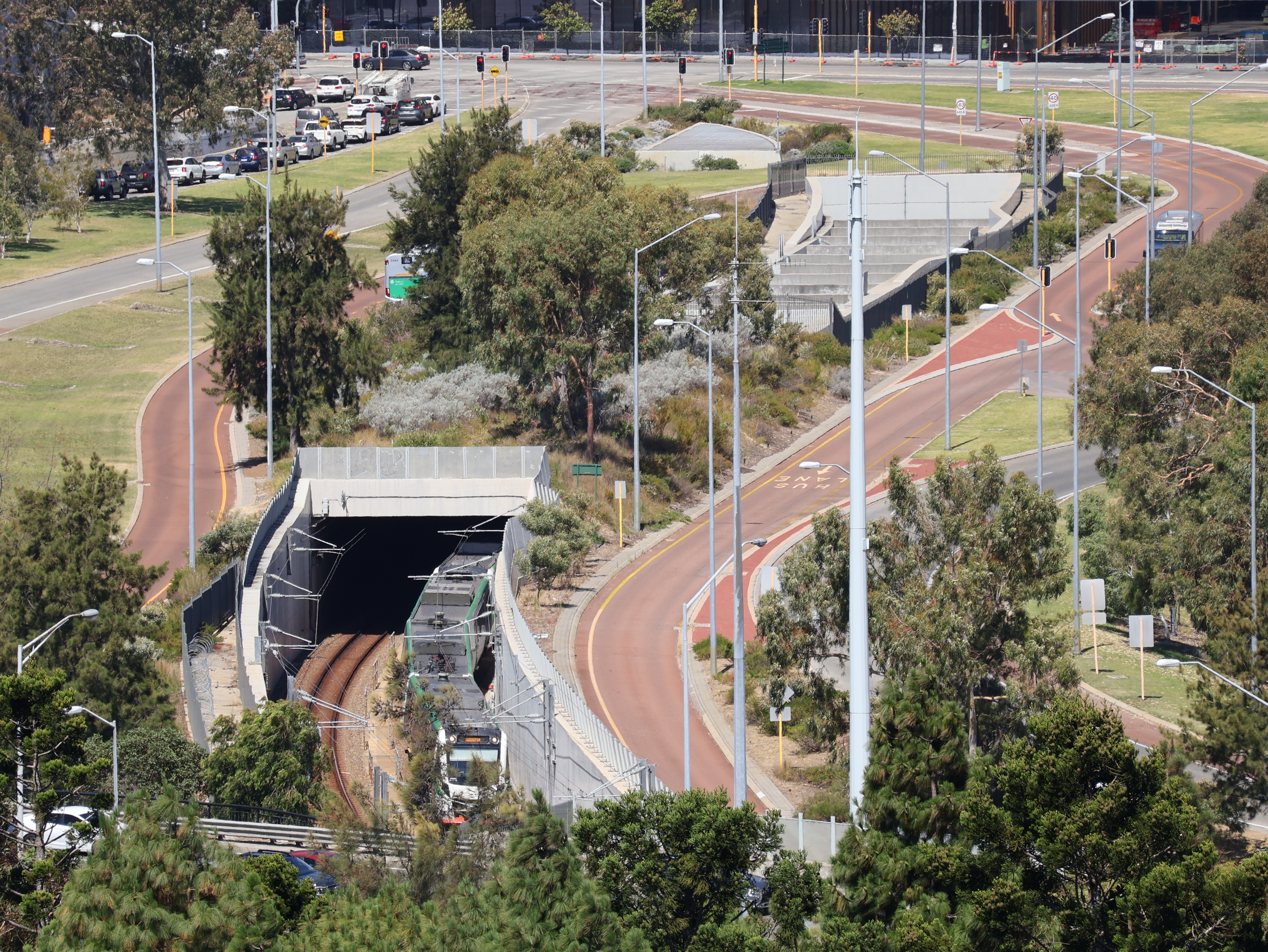
The southern entrance to the tunnel, including the 135 metres (443 ft) of uncovered tunnel, viewed from Kings Park

A design change was announced in July 2003: the William Street bridge on the foreshore was now to be demolished. The $1.3 million cost was to be offset by changes to the project's design, including leaving a 135-metre (443 ft) section of the tunnel uncovered within the freeway interchange and using natural light and ventilation for Esplanade station. There were concerns the bridge's removal would increase traffic, but Lord Mayor Nattrass supported it because it allowed for a future redevelopment of the foreshore. After lobbying from the Perth City Council, consideration was given to lowering the Fremantle line within Northbridge as part of the William Street tunnel's construction. The state government attempted to reach an agreement under which the City of Perth would fund the lowering in exchange for the right to develop the land on top of the railway, but with an estimated cost of $200 million, it was deemed too expensive.

Of the five consortia, CityConnect (Clough–McConnell Dowell–Obayashi) and Leighton–Kumagai Gumi were shortlisted in May 2003, and in November 2003 the latter was selected as the preferred proponent. The managing director of Clough did not want to agree to the government's requirement that the contractor take all the risk for cost escalation due to unknowns such as soil conditions and heritage buildings. The following month, the contract was approved by State Cabinet, the cost rising to about $320 million, bringing the cost of the Southern Suburbs Railway to $1.059 billion. This increase prompted shadow transport minister Katie Hodson-Thomas to call for the project to be "reconsidered" and National Party leader Max Trenorden to call for MacTiernan to be stood aside pending a parliamentary review into the project. In February 2004, the contract was signed for $324.5 million.

Under pressure from the Liberal Party and the Greens, MacTiernan promised in January 2004 to table the contract in Parliament, although Leighton opposed this. The contract was controversial due to the previous cost blowout and the financial risks of tunnelling. MacTiernan promised that almost all the risk would be on the contractor as it was a fixed-price contract, with the state liable for underground building anchors and the relocation of power and water utilities. The contract was tabled on 2 March 2004; MacTiernan said it was the first time a contract for such a construction project had been publicly released. The contract stated that delays beyond October 2006 would incur a penalty of $54,000 per day for the contractor. Throughout construction, MacTiernan emphasised that it was a fixed-price contract in response to speculation about cost blowouts. In August 2005, the state's Auditor General released a report that said the City Project's contract management had been effective, but that further cost escalations were possible.

== Construction ==
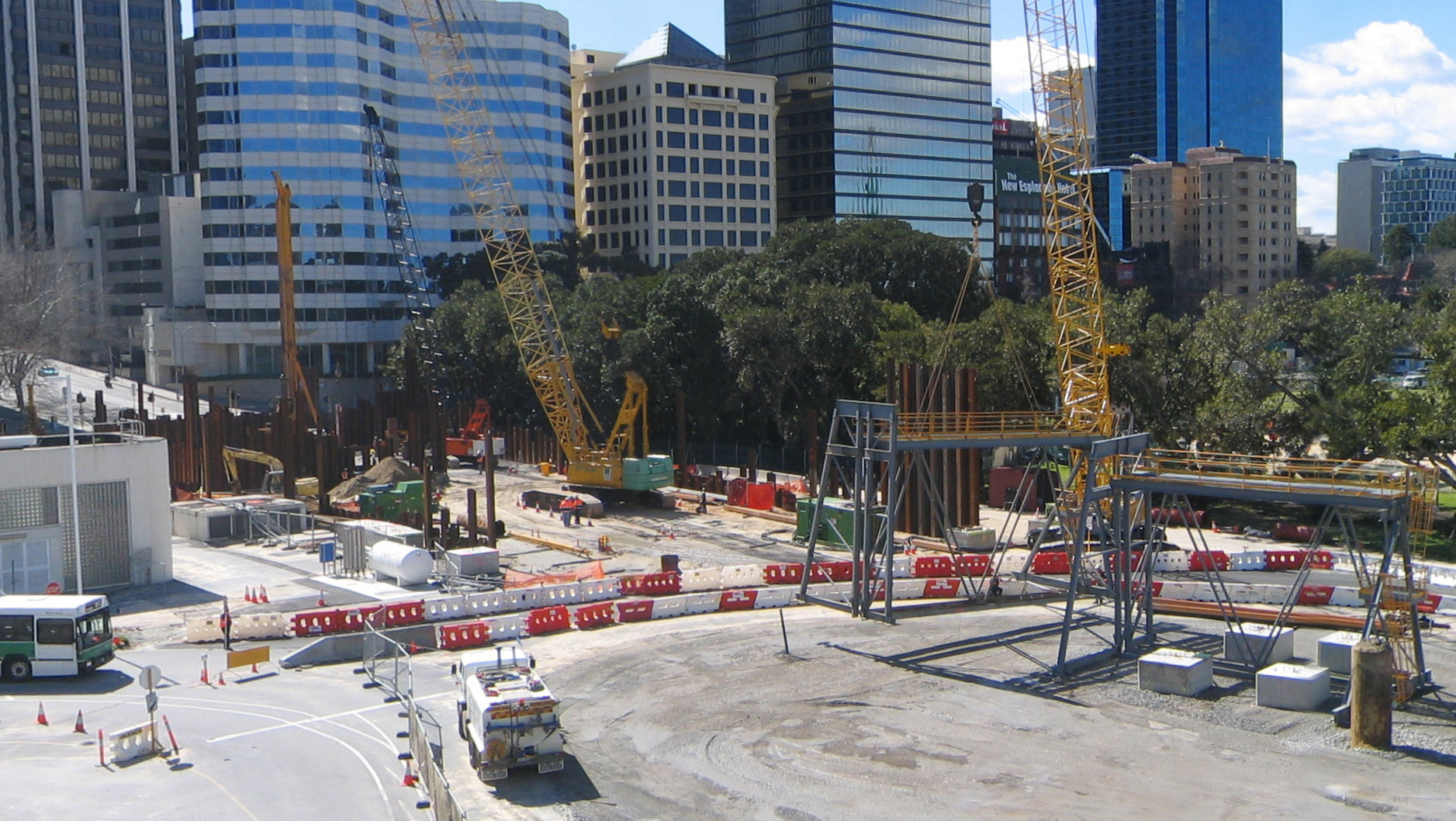
Esplanade station in August 2004. Sheet piles are being installed.

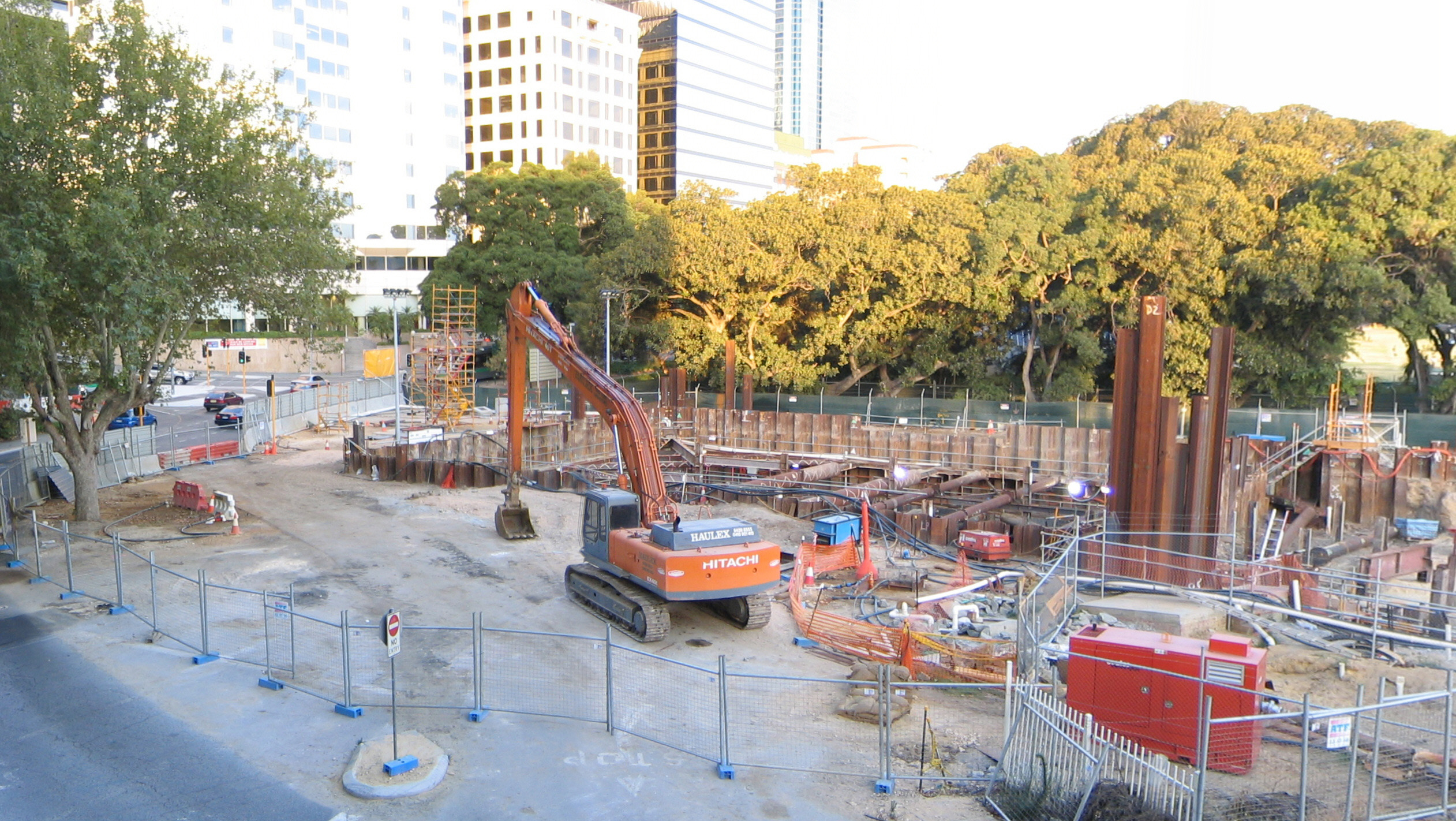
Esplanade station in February 2005. Excavation of the station box has begun.

A ceremony was held on 26 February 2004 for the start of preliminary drilling and surveying, which was the first physical work done for the Southern Suburbs Railway. Lane and road closures began in March 2004, starting with William Street, Wellington Street, and the Horseshoe Bridge in March, followed by Barrack Street, Riverside Drive, and The Esplanade in April. Demolition of buildings to make way for William Street station began in April 2004, and the William Street bridge was demolished in August 2004. It was intended that the freeway interchange would be redesigned to be more pedestrian-friendly. By October 2004, construction was several weeks behind schedule owing to delays arising from demolition and retaining the heritage-listed Wellington Building at the William Street station site, and equipment problems at the Esplanade station site.

By October 2005, the Joondalup line tracks had been shifted 6 metres (20 ft) to the south. Following this, the northern cut-and-cover tunnel within the rail corridor was completed, allowing for the Fremantle line to be shifted north above it, making room for the Roe Street dive structure, which contains the ramp up to the surface, to be built between the two lines. During excavation along the foreshore section of the tunnel, six wooden jetty pillars were uncovered, dating back to before Mounts Bay was reclaimed in the 1950s to build the Narrows Bridge. An art installation was planned at the tunnel's southern entrance, made of twenty reused sheet piles, 24 metres (79 ft) tall, to be painted on one side and left bare on the other. This art installation was cancelled in September 2007.

=== Tunnelling ===
The tunnels were dug by a single tunnel boring machine (TBM) named the Sandgroper, after the endemic insect. The TBM was launched from Esplanade station, boring north to Roe Street via William Street station, before being transported back to Esplanade station to bore the second tunnel. Ground conditions along the alignment varied significantly, ranging from soft estuarine muds near the Swan River to dense cemented sands and stiff to hard clays. As the tunnel was dug at a shallow level below buildings on William Street through sandy soil with high groundwater, an earth pressure balance TBM was chosen, which provides pressure at the cutter head to minimise ground settlement. Although the tunnel's vertical alignment was designed to avoid known ground anchors, which were used in the construction of basements along William Street, the TBM was fitted with three ground anchor detectors to identify any undocumented anchors that could otherwise cause ground settlement. The detectors could also be used to discover abandoned wells, many of which had poorly documented locations. Striking these could damage the TBM and cause ground settlement if they were not backfilled correctly when they were abandoned. Knife edge cutters were fitted to the TBM to break through these obstacles. Manufactured by Mitsubishi Heavy Industries in Kobe, Japan, the TBM cost $10 million, was 60 metres (200 ft) long, and weighed 300 tonnes (330 tons). The TBM arrived in Perth in April 2005 and was lifted into the Esplanade station box on 14 August 2005.

The start of tunnelling was delayed by several weeks because of mechanical problems with the TBM, including problems with jacking rings used to position the TBM and the conveyor belt. Tunnelling from Esplanade station began on 25 October 2005. The TBM was planned to initially bore 4 metres (13 ft) per day, increasing to 10 metres (33 ft) per day after several weeks, but after one week it had bored just 3.5 metres (11 ft). Progress was slow due to problems with o-rings, which needed to be replaced, and industrial action the following week. The first tunnel between the Esplanade and William Street stations, spanning 470 metres (1,540 ft), was intended to be completed before Christmas, but by the start of Christmas break, the TBM had bored 240 metres (790 ft). Tunnelling resumed early from the Christmas break to make up for lost time. The first phase of tunnelling passed under several buildings, including the heritage-listed Walsh's Building. Grout was injected into the ground underneath buildings above the tunnel's path as part of a compensation grouting program to reduce ground settlement.

The TBM broke through into William Street station on 7 February 2006. It resumed tunnelling on 4 May, heading north, reaching the Roe Street dive structure on 3 June, twelve days ahead of schedule. After being launched from Esplanade station for the second time on 19 July, the TBM reached William Street station on the night of 30–31 August. It was relaunched on 22 September and reached the Roe Street dive structure on 24 October 2006. The section of tunnel underneath Roe Street passes less than 1 metre (3 ft) below the century-old Claisebrook sewer. The maximum distance covered over a 24-hour period was 19 metres (62 ft). Minimal damage to buildings above the tunnel was recorded. As no buyer was found for the TBM, it was dismantled and sold for parts.

=== Opening ===
In April 2005, MacTiernan revealed that the City Project was not forecast to be complete until December 2006, after the October deadline. This postponed the Mandurah line's planned opening from December 2006 to April 2007. The delays were attributed to the heritage protection works at Perth Underground station, engineering challenges on the foreshore, and industrial disputes. The possibility of further delays caused by the City Project was first revealed by the PTA in December 2005. In April 2006, MacTiernan announced that the City Project's planned completion had been delayed to April 2007, pushing the Mandurah line's opening to July 2007. In April 2007, she announced a further delay, revising the line's opening to October 2007.

The first train ran through the William Street tunnel in August 2007. The City Project reached practical completion in September 2007 and was handed over to the PTA on 10 September. From 7 to 14 October, the Fremantle line was fully closed and the Joondalup line was closed south of Leederville station so that the William Street tunnel's tracks and signalling, electrical, and communications systems could be connected to the rest of the network. The William Street tunnel and its two stations opened to the public on 15 October 2007 and the rest of the Mandurah line opened on 23 December 2007.

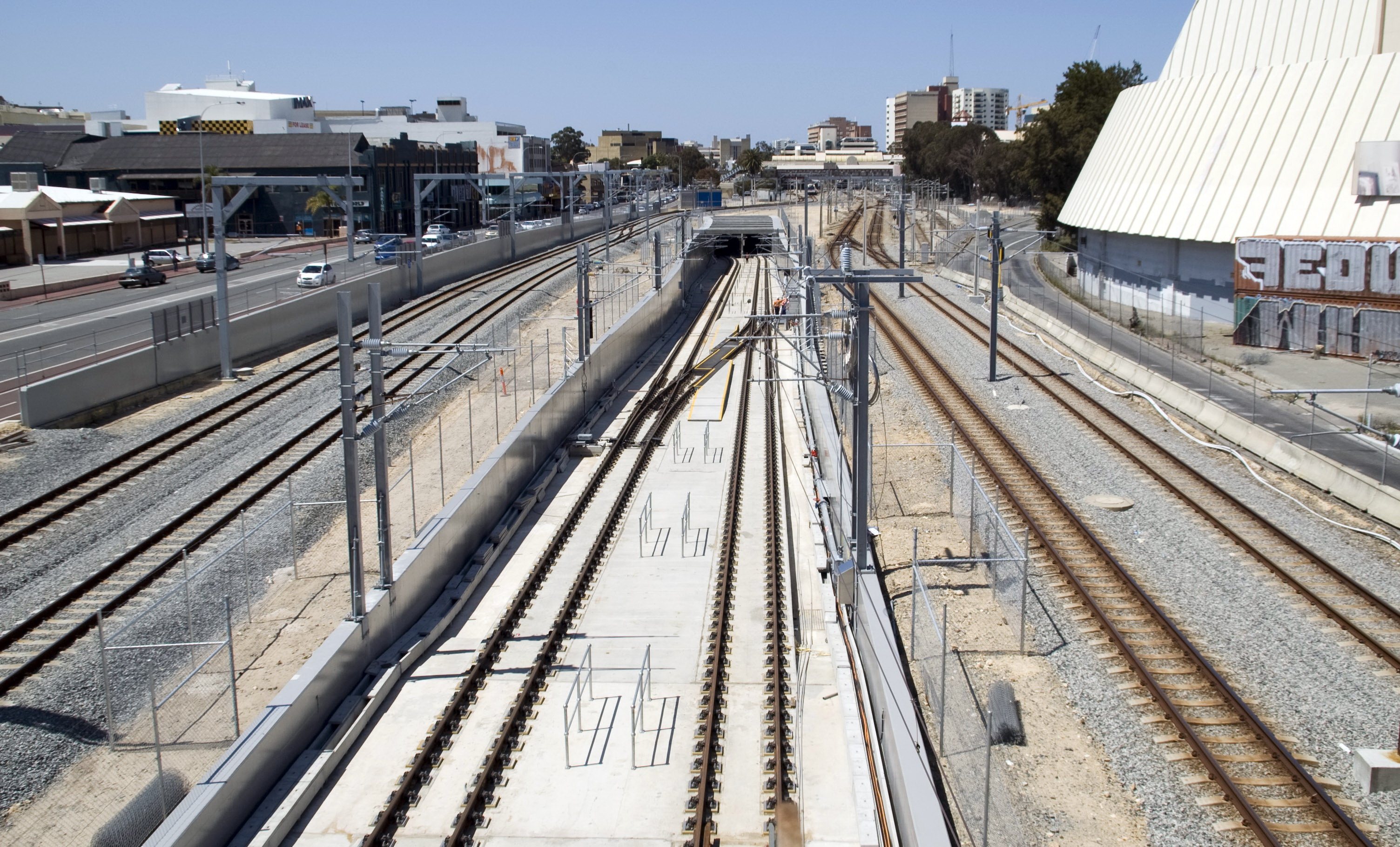
Perth rail yard facing east towards Perth station and the tunnel. On the left is the Fremantle line, the middle is the tracks leading to the tunnel, and the right is the Joondalup line.

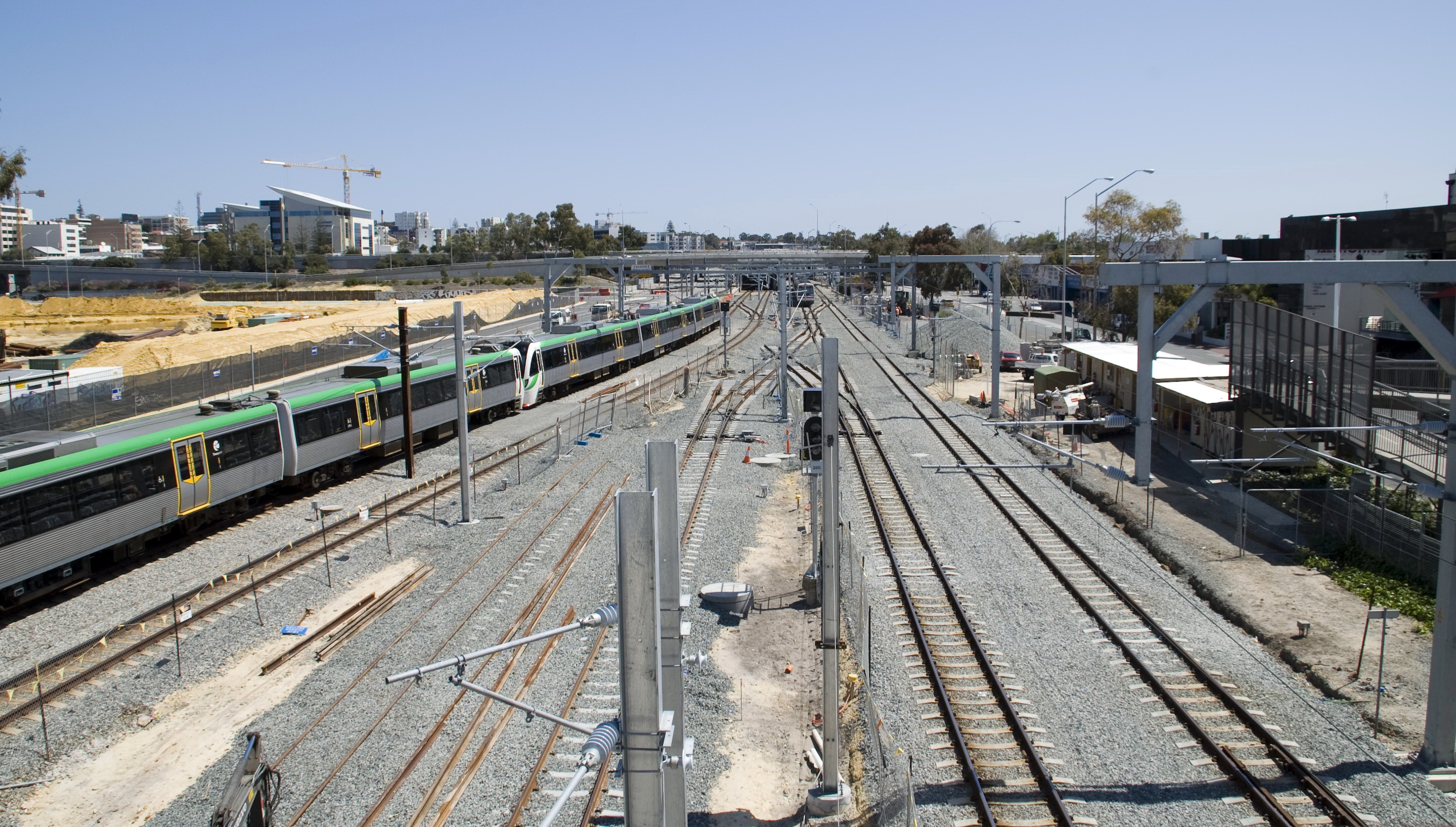
Perth rail yard facing west. The photograph was taken on 6 October 2007, two days before the Fremantle and Joondalup lines were shut down for the middle two tracks to be connected.

=== After opening ===
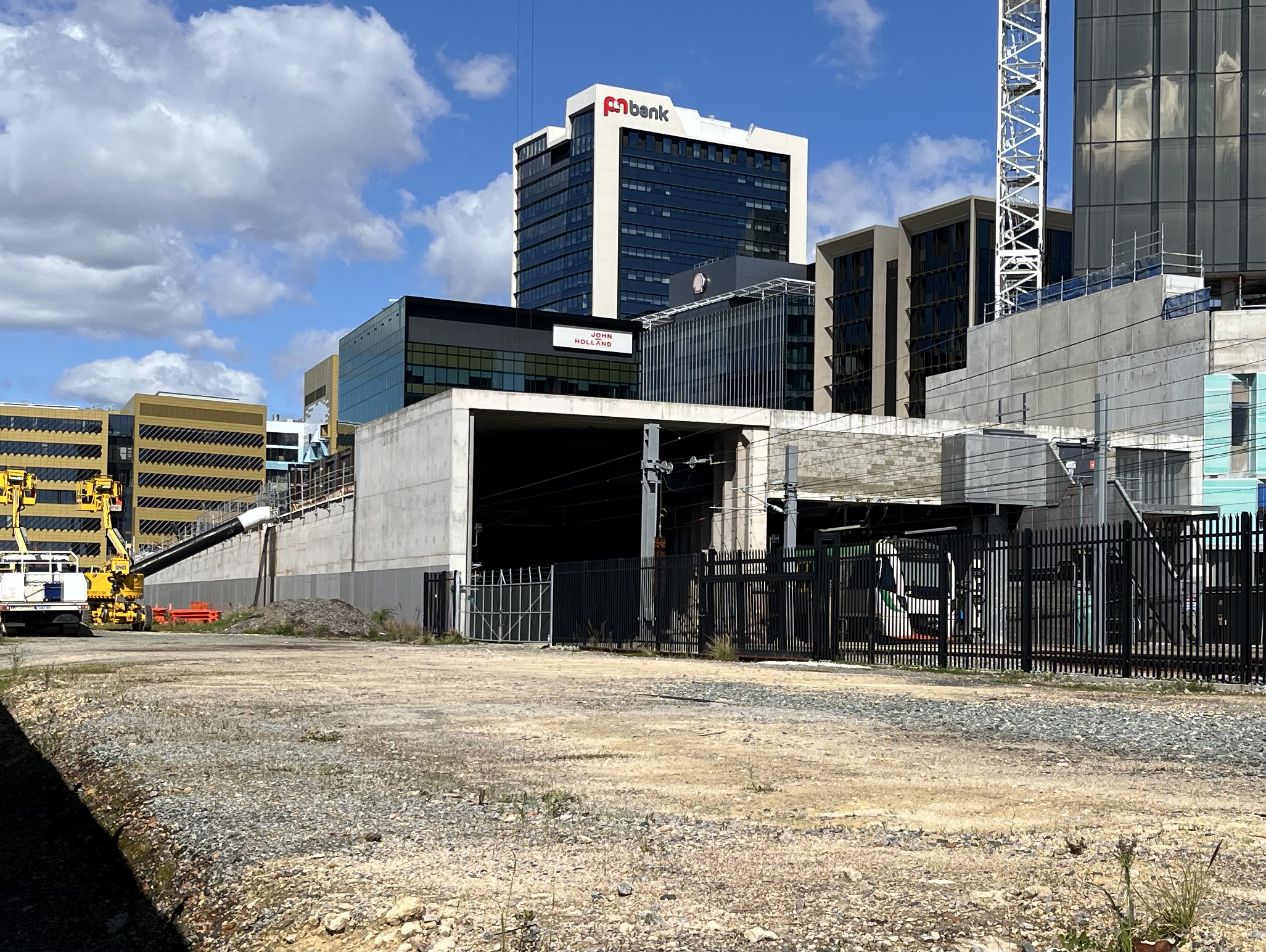
The roof of the William Street tunnel (left) was extended to Milligan Street, in conjunction with the sinking of the Fremantle line (right) in 2012 and 2013

In 2012 and 2013, the section of the Fremantle line adjacent to the William Street tunnel was lowered into a tunnel for $360 million as part of the Perth City Link project, the new tunnel passing just 1.2 metres (4 ft) above the William Street tunnel. In conjunction with this, the roof of the William Street tunnel was extended from Lake Street to Milligan Street, enabling development above the tunnel.

== Industrial action ==
Starting in November 2004, construction was disrupted by strikes. The state government generally took a hands-off approach to the strikes, saying it was a matter between the Construction, Forestry and Maritime Employees Union (CFMEU) and Leighton–Kumagai Gumi. Further strikes occurred in January 2005 because of smoke haze, and April 2005 due to an incident on a Leighton site for another package. By May 2005, the City Project had lost twenty-eight days to strikes, the most of any Southern Suburbs Railway package. Further strikes occurred in July because of safety issues, in August for an unknown reason, and in October because of workers complaining about excessive overtime. In November, a strike that lasted several days paused tunnel boring. After workers failed to follow a return-to-work order given by the Australian Industrial Relations Commission, Leighton–Kumagai Gumi applied for a strike ban, telling the commission that unscheduled stoppages to tunnelling would change the pressure at the TBM's cutter head, which could cause pipes to burst, buildings to crack, and potholes to appear in roads. In its application, the contractor said that it had lost forty-six days of work to industrial action since July 2004. A strike ban for the remainder of the project was granted in December 2005, which the CFMEU said it would disobey.

In February 2006, Leighton filed a writ in the Supreme Court of Western Australia against the CFMEU and its assistant secretary Joe McDonald, for having allegedly "unlawfully interfered in its business and in its relationship with its employees and subcontractors". Leighton and the CFMEU reached a pre-trial settlement in November 2006; the CFMEU paid Leighton $150,000 plus legal costs and admitted to breaching the Building and Construction Industry Improvement Act twenty-nine times. Leighton and the CFMEU reached another out-of-court settlement in July 2009, worth millions of dollars.

Over 400 workers went on strike starting 24 February 2006, violating the strike ban, in protest against the dismissal of a shop steward for telling other workers to go home without permission from management. On 28 February, they voted to remain on strike until the unfair dismissal claim was heard by the Industrial Relations Commission. MacTiernan criticised the strike, but said that there was nothing she could do as it was the contractor's responsibility to find a solution; Leighton and the state opposition disputed MacTiernan's statement. The Industrial Relations Commission refused to expedite the unfair dismissal hearing while the strike was ongoing. The strikers voted on 8 March to return to work. In July 2006, the Australian Building and Construction Commission issued writs against 107 workers for defying the strike ban in February 2006. Because the strike was done against the advice of the CFMEU, the Building and Construction Commission sued the individual workers instead, the first time this had been done under the new Building and Construction Industry Improvement Act, which had been recently passed by the Howard government. The prosecution was described as "unprecedented" by the Australian Institute of Employment Rights, which criticised the act for removing the right to strike. Eighty-seven of the prosecuted workers admitted the strike was illegal in October 2007. Leighton claimed the strike had cost them more than $1,280,000 and had created safety issues for tunnelling. In December 2007, the Federal Court fined the workers up to $9,000 for striking and $1,000 for ignoring a return-to-work order from the Industrial Relations Commission.

== Contract disputes ==
Throughout 2004 and 2005, the Leighton–Kumagai Gumi joint venture lodged claims totalling $50 million due to cost overruns. In early 2006, it submitted a claim for an extra $141 million in cost overruns resulting from unforeseen ground conditions, labour strikes, delays in demolition, and the preservation of heritage buildings. MacTiernan said that the claims were unfounded and that the state government would not pay for the cost overruns. Leighton had initially expected to make an $8 million profit on the project, which became a $10–15 million loss. Leighton CEO Wal King met with Premier Alan Carpenter in an attempt to reach an agreement. The claims had risen a further $13 million by March 2006, reaching a total of $204 million; MacTiernan said that only a small portion of that total would be paid out.

Leighton filed a writ in the Supreme Court of Western Australia in April 2006 seeking to be relieved of its contractual obligations due to the PTA's failure to establish insurance for the whole cost of the contract, or alternatively have the practical completion deadline extended until the PTA provided the insurance. By this point, tunnelling had stopped because the joint venture did not want to start the most challenging phase without the proper insurance to cover risks such as cave-ins. Tunnelling resumed on 8 May after an agreement was reached for the government to cover insurance claims until the Supreme Court determined the appropriate level of insurance.

The cost overrun claims were divided into several separate Supreme Court writs. The first, filed in June, related to the contract's rise and fall provisions, which specified that an Australian Bureau of Statistics (ABS) index would be used to calculate the escalating cost of labour and materials. The ABS discontinued the index soon after the contract was signed, so the dispute related to which alternative method should be used. Another writ was filed in June 2006, seeking damages to cover the cost of disposing of contaminated soil and an extension to the practical completion deadline. By September 2007, there was another writ, this one for the cost of dewatering.

The trial for the rise and fall provisions dispute started in September 2007. In September 2008, the court ruled in favour of Leighton, awarding it about $6 million in damages. All legal action ended with a $43.675 million settlement in May 2009, bringing the total cost of the City Project to $439.3 million, excluding legal fees.

== See also ==
- City Rail Link
- Cross River Rail
- Metro Tunnel
- List of tunnels in Australia
