= Perth Underground railway station =

Railway station in Perth, Western Australia

Perth Underground
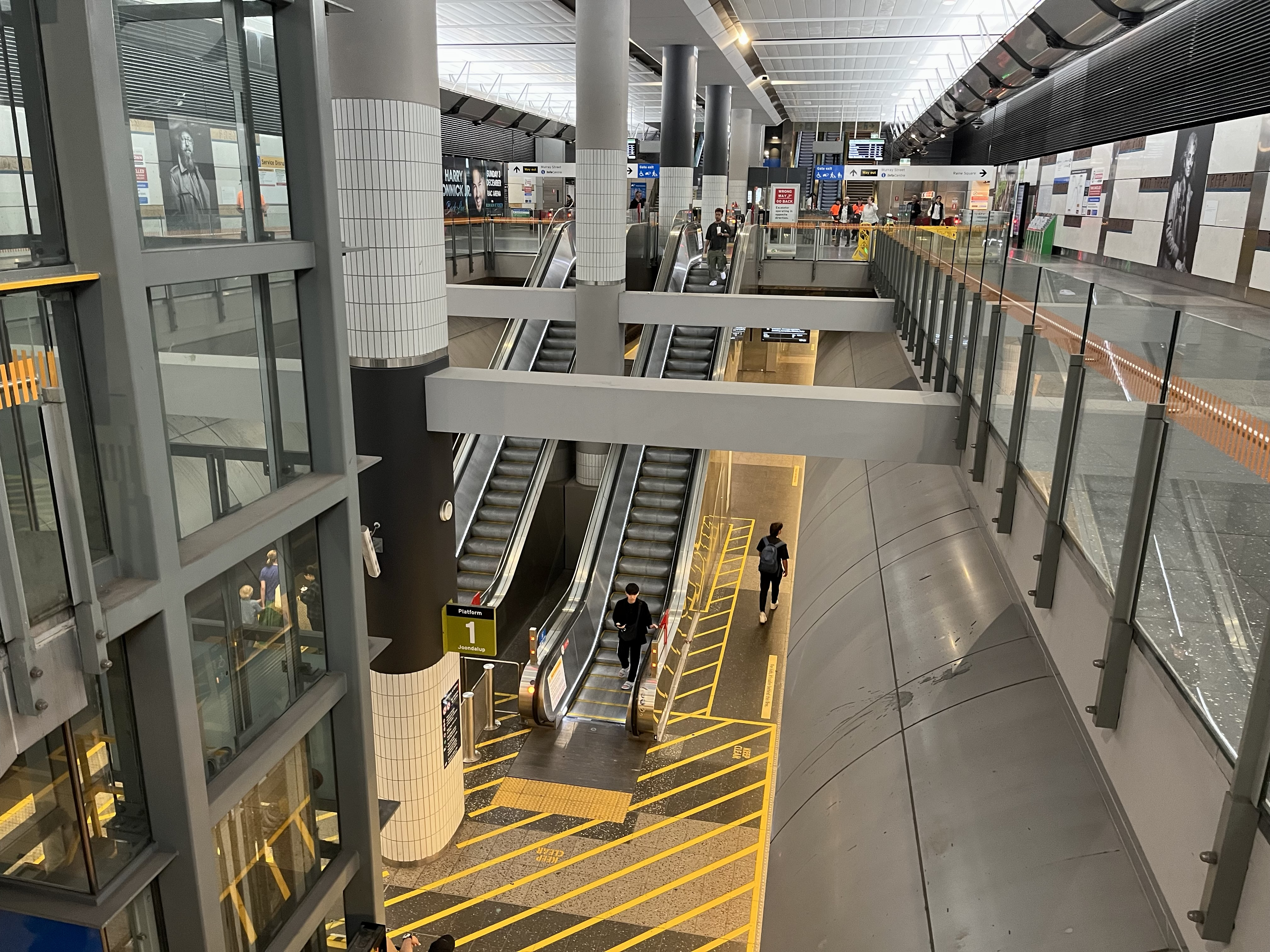
- Main concourse level of the station, November 2023

General information
- Other names: William Street station
- Location: 140 William Street, Perth; Western Australia; Australia
- Coordinates: 31°57′07″S 115°51′29″E
- Owner: Public Transport Authority
- Operator: Public Transport Authority
- Lines: Yanchep line; Mandurah line
- Platforms: 1 island platform with 2 platform edges
- Tracks: 2
- Connections: Perth station

Construction
- Structure type: Underground
- Depth: 18 metres (59 ft) below the Murray Street Mall
- Parking: No
- Cycle facilities: No
- Accessible: Yes

Other information
- Fare zone: 1 / FTZ

History
- Opened: 15 October 2007

Passengers
- 2013–14: 12,418,561

Services
| Preceding station | Transperth | Following station |
|---|---|---|
| Elizabeth Quay Terminus | Yanchep line All, K, W | Leederville towards Whitfords, Clarkson or Yanchep |
| Elizabeth Quay towards Cockburn Central or Mandurah | Mandurah line All, W | through to Yanchep line |
Location
- Location of Perth Underground station

Perth Underground railway station is a railway station within the Perth central business district in Western Australia along the William Street tunnel. It is adjacent to the above-ground Perth railway station and is sometimes considered part of that station. Perth Underground station is served by Yanchep line services heading north and Mandurah line services heading south. It was built as part of the construction for the Mandurah line and was known as William Street station during construction due to its location on William Street. Perth Underground station consists of an island platform and a concourse below ground. There are five entrances to the station: from Murray Street Mall, Raine Square, 140 William Street, underneath the Horseshoe Bridge, and from Perth station.

The contract for Package F of the Mandurah line, which included the construction of Perth Underground station, Elizabeth Quay station (known as Esplanade station prior to 2016), 700 metres (2,300 ft) of bored tunnels and 600 metres (2,000 ft) of cut-and-cover tunnels, was awarded to Leighton Contractors and Kumagai Gumi in February 2004 at a cost of A$324.5 million. Demolition of buildings on the Perth Underground site occurred between April and August 2004. From September 2004 to January 2005, the station's diaphragm walls were constructed. By the end of 2005, the station box had been excavated to its lowest level, and in February 2006, the tunnel boring machine (TBM) reached the station, having tunnelled from Esplanade station. From there, the TBM tunnelled north. The TBM reached the station again in August 2006 while digging the second tunnel, and it again tunnelled north to surface west of Perth station.

Perth Underground and Esplanade stations opened to Yanchep line (known at the time as Joondalup line) services on 15 October 2007. Mandurah line services south of Esplanade station commenced on 23 December 2007. The land above the station was developed by Cbus Property and Leighton Contractors to form the 140 William Street development, which was completed in 2010. In 2013, a pedestrian tunnel linking Perth Underground with Perth station opened as part of the Perth City Link project. Trains at Perth Underground station run at a five-minute frequency during peak hour and a fifteen-minute frequency outside peak and on weekends and public holidays. At night, trains are half-hourly or hourly. The station received 12,418,561 boardings in the 2013–14 financial year.

== Description ==
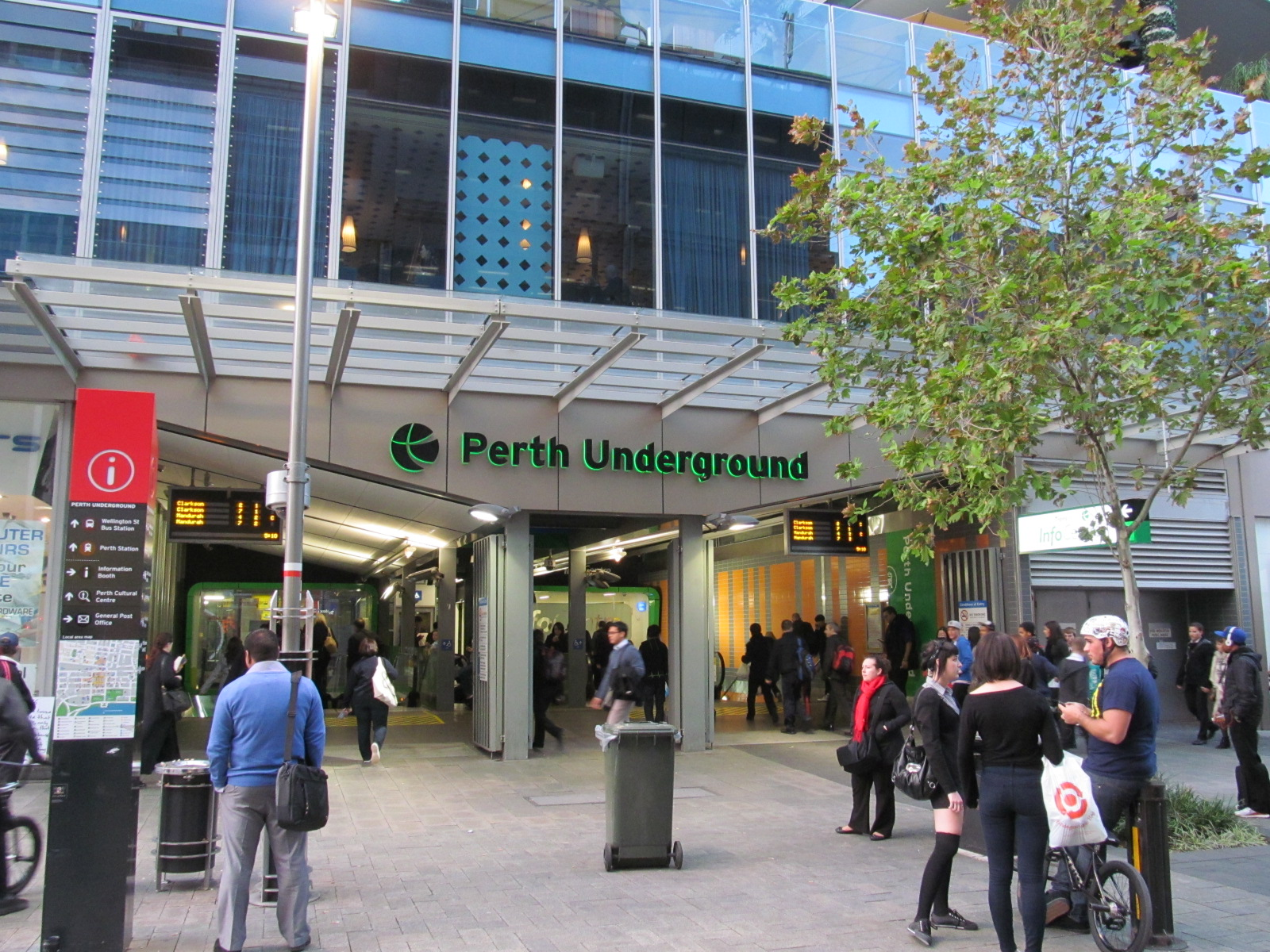
Murray Street Mall entrance to Perth Underground station

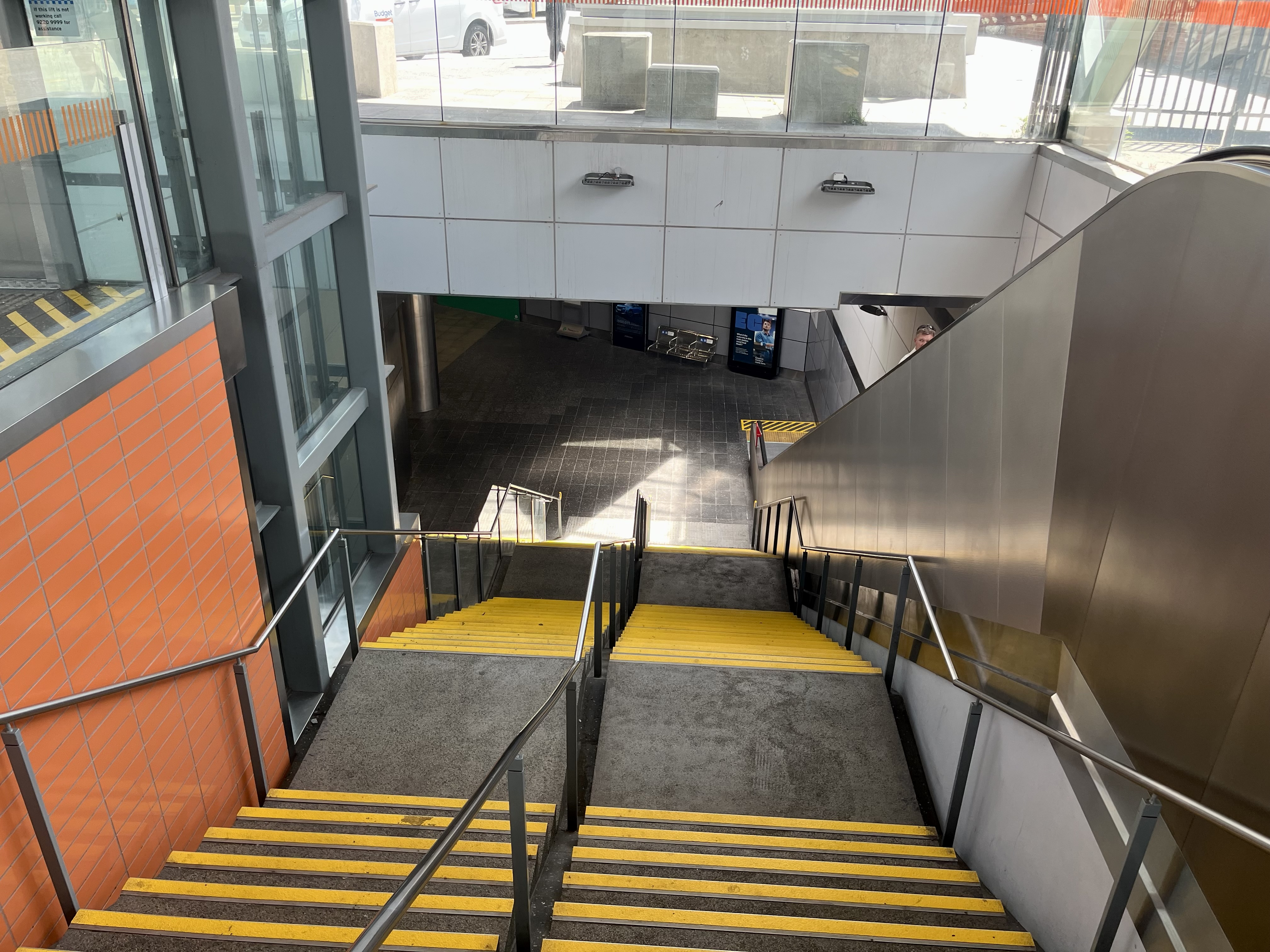
Stairs down to Perth Underground station from the Horseshoe Bridge entrance

Perth Underground station is situated along the William Street tunnel. It is surrounded by Wellington Street to the north, William Street to the west and Murray Street Mall to the south. The adjacent stations are Leederville station to the north and Elizabeth Quay station (known as Esplanade station prior to 2016) to the south. The station is directly linked with the above-ground Perth station, which is perpendicular to Perth Underground station. Above the station is the 140 William Street development. The station is owned by the Public Transport Authority (PTA) and is within the Free Transit Zone, a zone that covers the Perth central business district.

Perth Underground station has two levels below ground: platform level, where there is an island platform with two tracks, and concourse level, which has five entrances. Several sets of stairs, escalators and lifts link platform level with concourse level. The station box is 138 metres (453 ft) long, 22 metres (72 ft) wide at its southern end, 29 metres (95 ft) wide at its northern end, and 19 metres (62 ft) below ground at its deepest point. The platforms are 16 metres (52 ft) below ground level at the southern end, and the concourse is 10 metres (33 ft) below ground level.

The three entrances to the concourse level on the southern end are from the Murray Street Mall, a tunnel to Raine Square on the other side of William Street, and an entrance from 140 William Street above. The two entrances to the concourse level on the northern end are from underneath the Horseshoe Bridge and a tunnel that leads directly to Perth station. The Horseshoe Bridge entrance was formerly the main thoroughfare between Perth Underground and Perth station before the pedestrian tunnel opened in 2013. Each entrance is fully accessible, with stairs, escalators and lifts at each one. Each entrance also has a ticket barrier.

=== Artwork ===
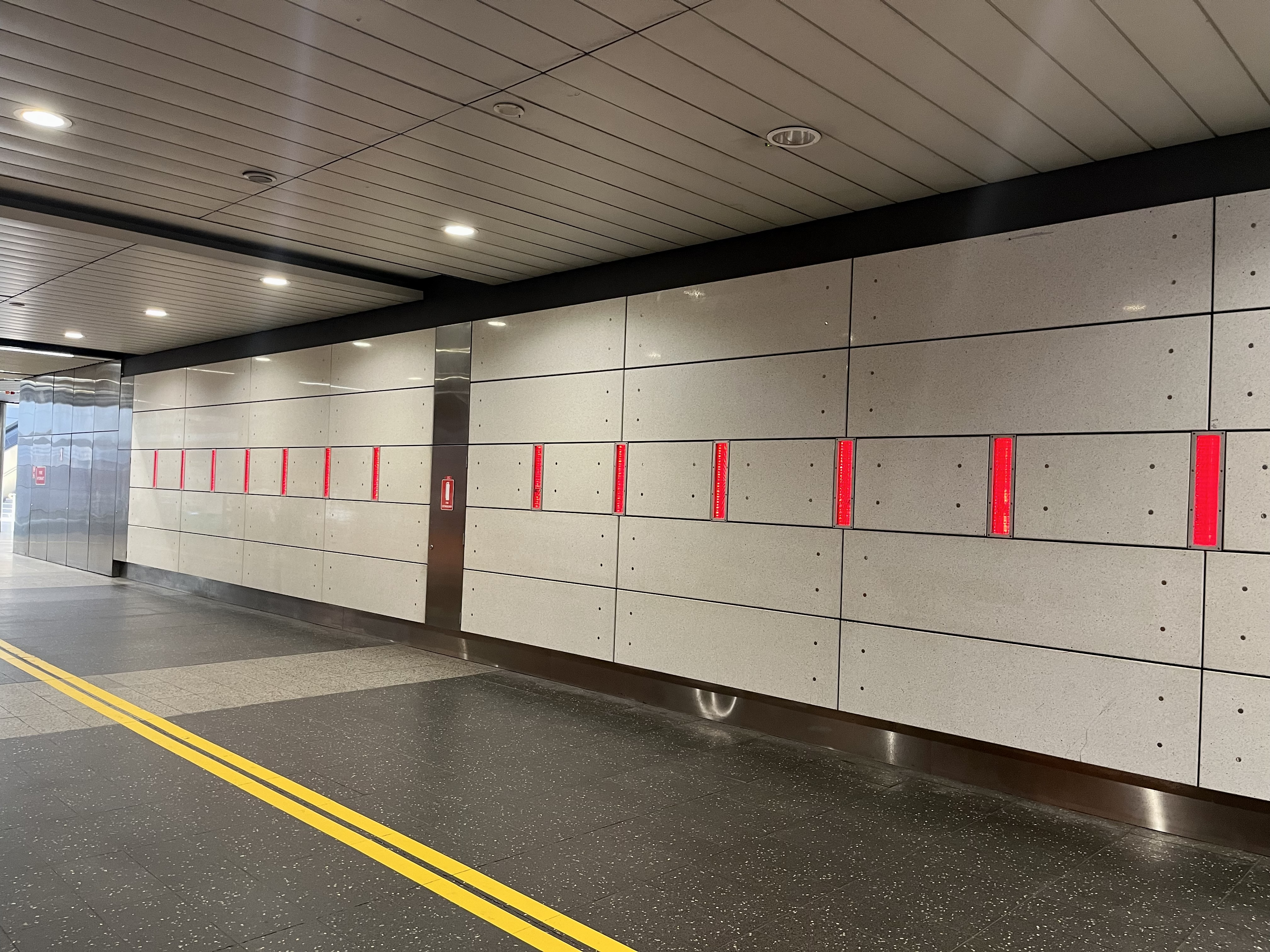
Light, space and place, by Anne Neil

There are two pieces of public art at Perth Underground station: Take it or leave it, by Jurek Wybraniec and Stephen Neille, and Light, space and place, by Anne Neil. Take it or leave it consists of coloured sandstone panels on the concourse's wall. "Stream-of-consciousness words relating to the themes of time and motion" are sandblasted into the panels. Light, space and place consists of 21 LED lights on the walls of the tunnel to the northern entrance. The lights are programmed to change colours to "create a pulse or heart beat".

A third piece of public art was planned to be installed above a skylight next to the Horseshoe Bridge. Named the Sapphire Clock Tower, it was to be a 15-metre-high (49 ft) sculpture made of glass and designed to look like a crystal, with a digital clock display linked by landline to an atomic clock at the University of Western Australia. Although in 2007 it was still planned for the clock tower to be built, the art piece was cancelled in 2010 due to there being "little support".

== History ==
=== Planning ===
Upon opening on 20 December 1992, Joondalup line trains stopped at Perth station and continued east of there as the Armadale line. The first South West Metropolitan Railway Master Plan, published in 1999, detailed the route of the future Mandurah line. It would branch off the Armadale line at Kenwick, requiring no new stations in the Perth central business district (CBD). Following the election of the Labor Party to power in the 2001 state election, the route of the Mandurah line was changed. A new master plan was released, outlining the new and more direct route, which travels in a tunnel under the Perth CBD before surfacing and running down the median of the Kwinana Freeway from Perth to Kwinana. The new route had two new stations within the Perth CBD: Perth Underground station (known during construction as William Street station) and Esplanade station. Perth Underground station had a predicted number of weekday boardings of 27,000.

=== Construction ===
The design and construction of Perth Underground station was overseen by the PTA under its New MetroRail division. Acquisition of land for the construction of Perth Underground station was managed by LandCorp and occurred between May 2003 and March 2004. Some landowners were resistant, due to concerns about fair compensation. LandCorp negotiated with landowners, and compulsory acquisition was used for properties where negotiations fell through. At least one landowner later sued the Western Australian Planning Commission, claiming the amount they were compensated was not enough. In 2005, LandCorp said the total amount used to acquire the properties was about A$40 million at that point, and in April 2006, the minister for planning and infrastructure, Alannah MacTiernan, said the total cost of acquiring the properties was $43.26 million, above the $40 million expected in 2002.

The construction of the Mandurah line, also known as the Southern Suburbs Railway, was divided into eight main contract packages. The William Street tunnel was part of Package F, which consisted of 700 metres (2,300 ft) of bored tunnels, 600 metres (2,000 ft) of cut-and-cover tunnels, the construction of William Street and Esplanade stations, the connection of the railway to the rest of the network west of Perth station, and construction of tracks and overhead wiring within the tunnels. This was also known as the City Project. Expressions of interest for the Package F contract were called for in March 2003, and five consortia submitted expressions of interest by May. The contract for the design and construction of Package F was awarded to a joint venture between Leighton Contractors and Kumagai Gumi in February 2004 at a cost of $324.5 million. Leighton–Kumagai appointed architecture firm Hassell to design the two stations; structural design was carried out by Maunsell.

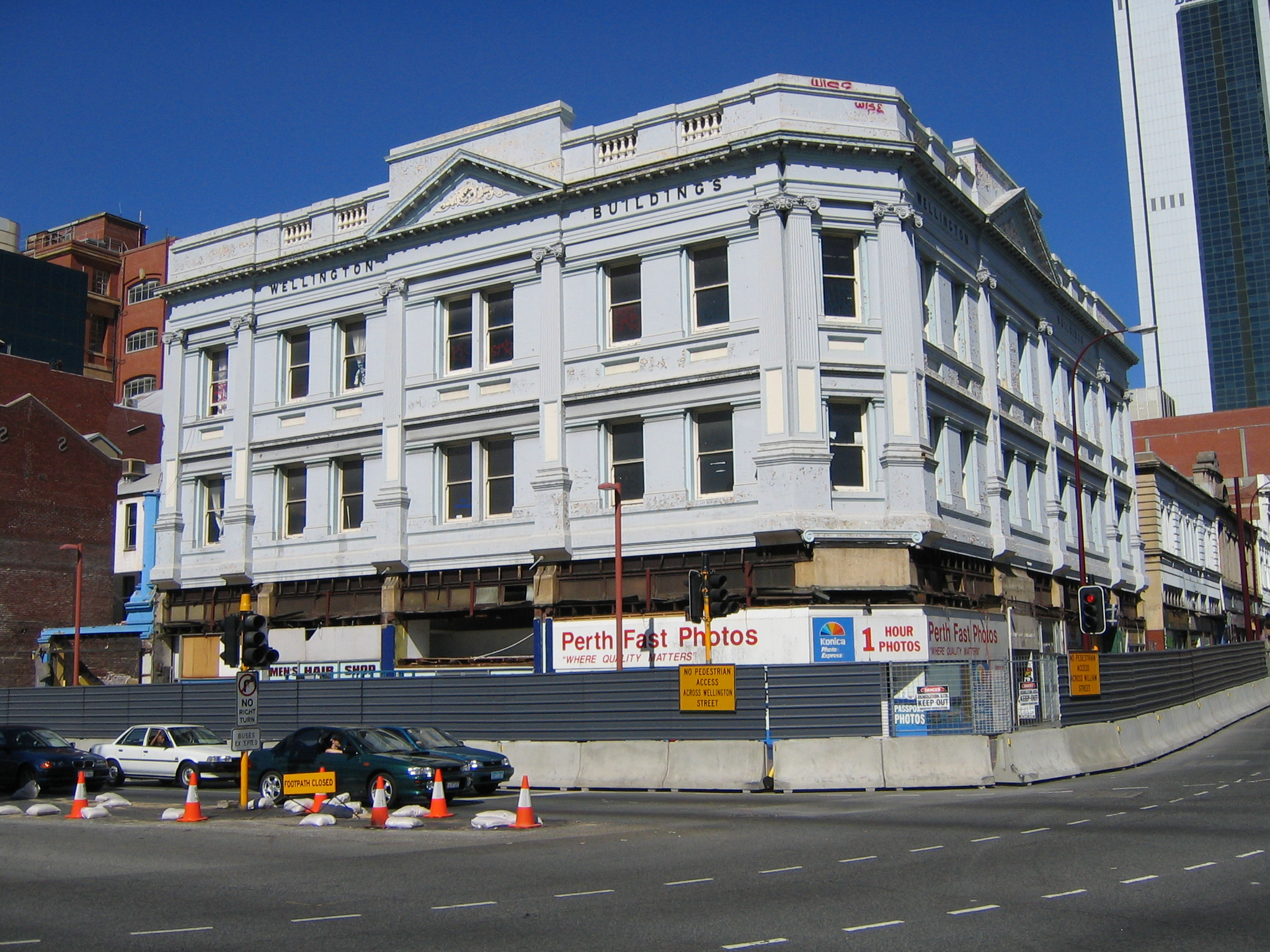
The Wellington Building, pictured in May 2004 during the construction of Perth Underground station

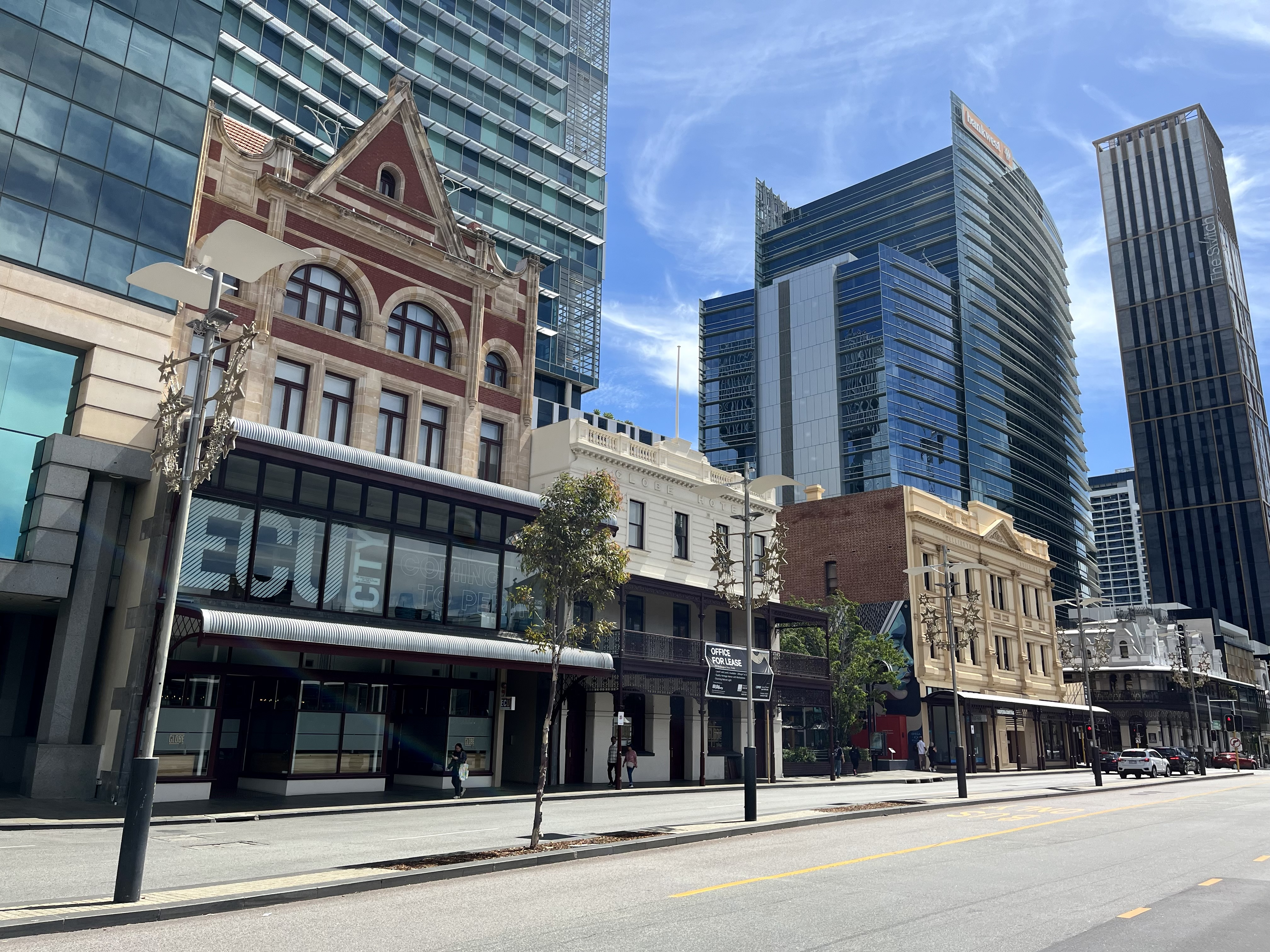
From left to right: the Baird's Building, Globe Hotel and Wellington Building in 2023

Demolition works for the buildings above the Perth Underground station site occurred between April and August 2004. Six buildings were demolished, including the old Myer building. Three buildings along Wellington Street that were listed on the State Register of Heritage Places were retained: the Wellington Building, the original Globe Hotel and the Baird's Building. The façade of the Mitchell's Building on William Street was also kept. The Wellington Building was the most significant of these four buildings, and it was challenging to keep the building intact during construction of the station, causing delays to the overall project. Collectively, these four buildings are part of the William & Wellington Street Precinct on the Heritage Council database.

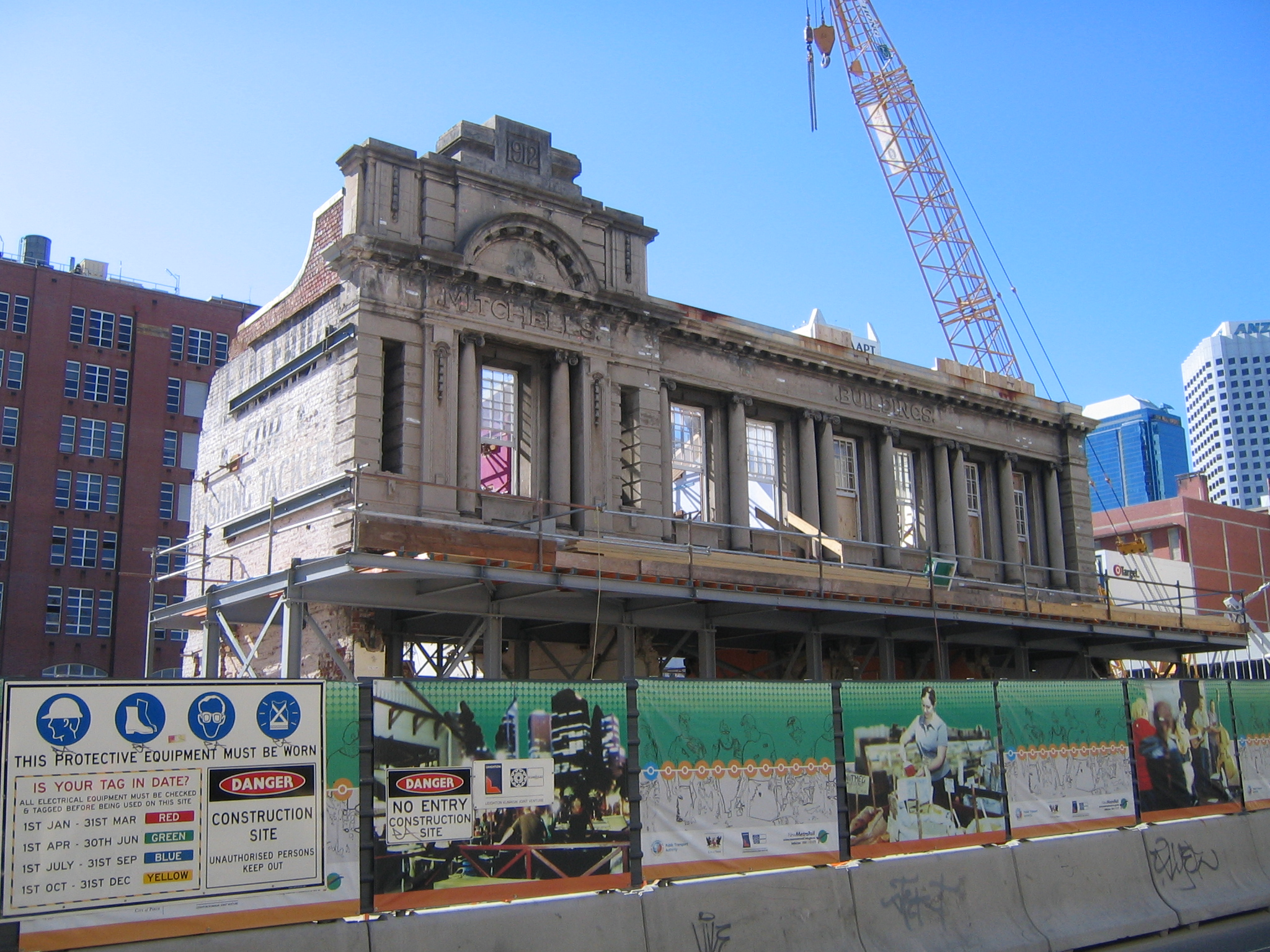
The Mitchell's Building in January 2005, preparing to relocate the building's façade

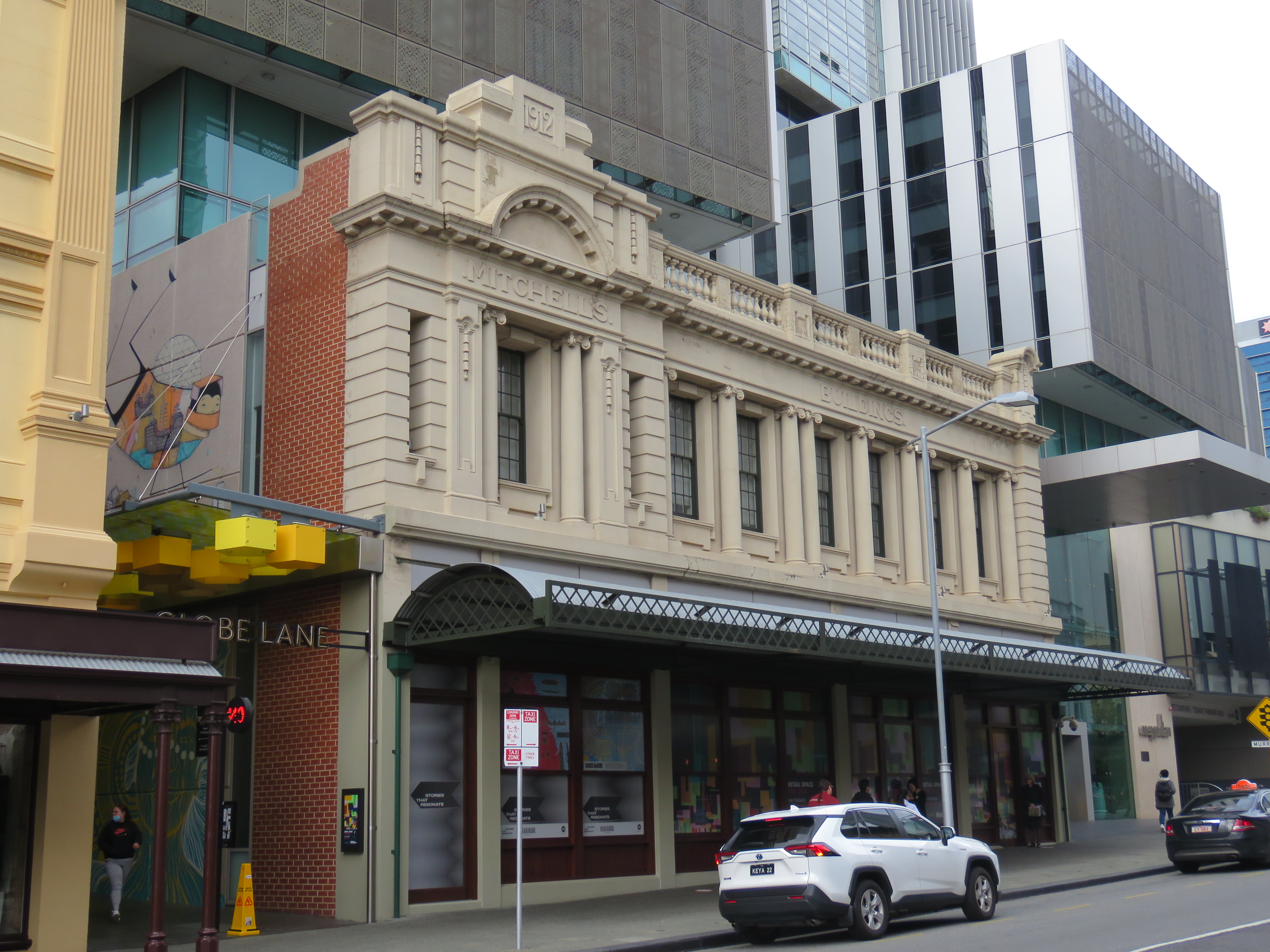
The Mitchell's Building in August 2022 after reassembly

The Wellington Building's foundations were removed and replaced to allow construction underneath the building. The ground floor of the building was removed, which allowed pile drivers into the building's basement floor. Piles were drilled 55 metres (180 ft) deep, which anchored a concrete slab which formed a roof over the space to be excavated below. The Wellington Building was attached to this concrete slab, allowing the old foundations to be removed and excavation to occur below. In March 2005, the Mitchell's Building's façade was dismantled and stored offsite, with the intention of putting it back in place when the station was complete. The façade was attached to a steel frame, then cut into nine pieces which were each lifted out by a crane.

The station was constructed using the top-down method. Diaphragm walls were chosen to form the station box's walls rather than sheet piles like at Esplanade station as there were restrictions on noise and vibrations, and less land was required to construct diaphragm walls. The site was quite restricted; Wellington Street, William Street and the Murray Street Mall are right next to the station box. The diaphragm walls for the Perth Underground station box were constructed between September 2004 and January 2005. These are 1 metre (3 ft 3 in) thick and extend up to 30 metres (98 ft) below ground. The station box is wider at the northern end as the diaphragm walls had to deviate around the Wellington Building. Perth Underground station lies on the reclaimed Lake Kingsford, which was a lake within the Perth Wetlands. This left the area with large amounts of wet sand, which made ensuring the station box would not move a concern. The station box was attached to rock over 30 metres (98 ft) below ground level.

In April 2005, MacTiernan announced that the New MetroRail project completion date had been delayed from December 2006 to April 2007. One of the causes for the delay was the heritage protection works at Perth Underground station. In April 2006, she announced that the project's opening date had been delayed to July 2007. In April 2007, MacTiernan revealed another delay, this time with the likely opening date being October 2007.

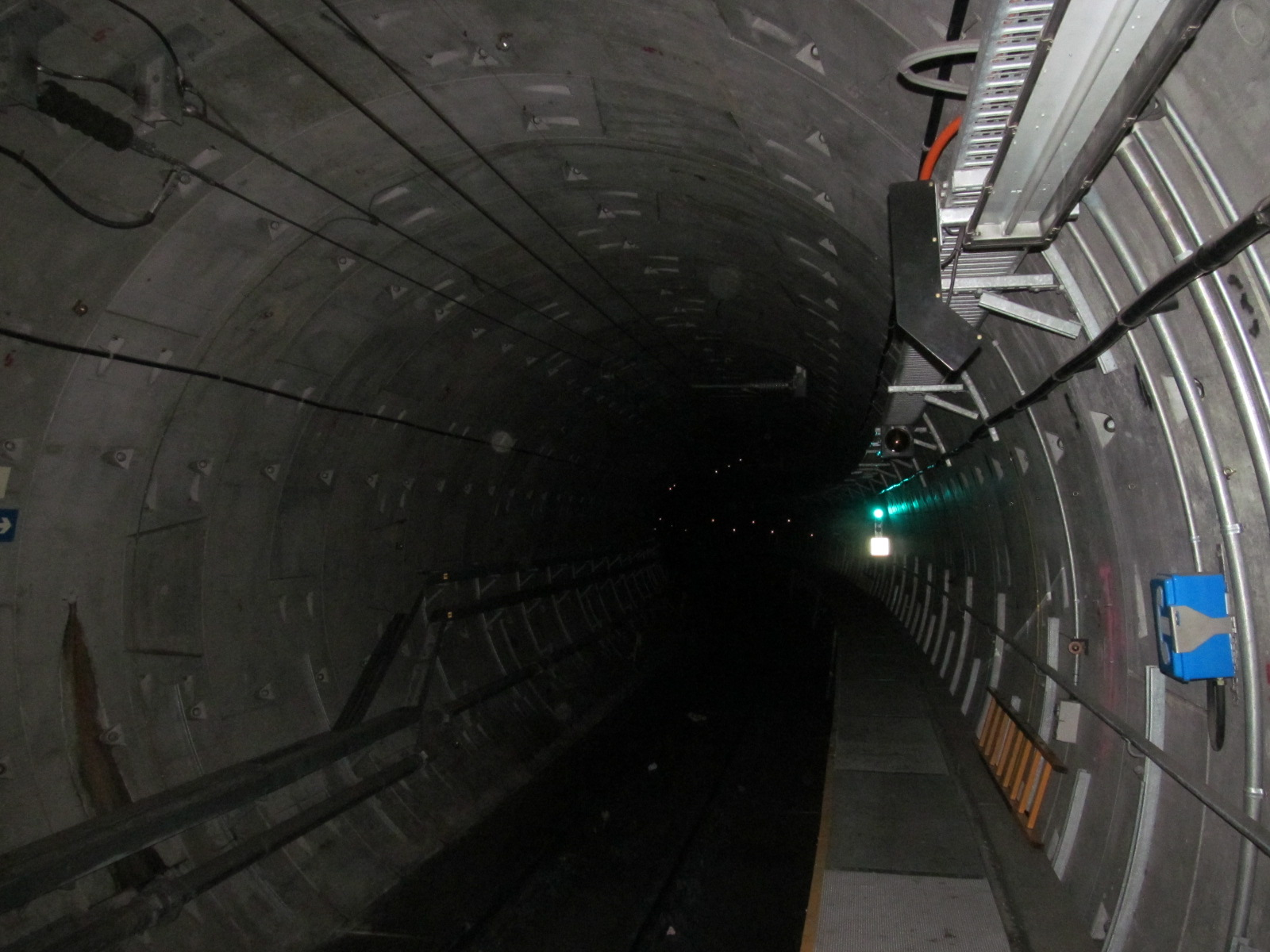
Tunnel viewed from Perth Underground station

By the end of 2005, the station box had been excavated to its lowest level, 18 metres (59 ft) below the Murray Street Mall and 4 metres (13 ft) below the Swan River. The tunnel boring machine (TBM) for the first tunnel between Perth Underground and Esplanade station broke through to the station box on 7 February 2006, having been digging from Esplanade station since October 2005. The breakthrough was more difficult than expected; rock drills had to be brought in to drill from inside the station box to complete the TBM's breakthrough. The TBM was then transported across the station box to the northern end, where it began tunnelling north towards the dive structure west of Perth station. After surfacing at the dive structure, the TBM was transported back to Esplanade station, where it began boring the second tunnel towards Perth Underground station. The TBM broke through the Perth Underground station box for the second time on 31 August 2006. It was again transported to the northern side of the station box, where it started boring the final tunnel to the dive structure. Tunnelling was fully completed on 24 October 2006. By the end of 2006, most structural work had been completed, and architectural finishes and electrical and mechanical fit-out had commenced.

The first test train ran through the tunnels on 11 August 2007. The City Project achieved practical completion in September 2007, and was handed over from the contractor to the PTA on 10 September. From 7 October to 14 October 2007, the Fremantle and Joondalup lines were shut down to connect the tunnel tracks to the rest of the network. From 15 October, Joondalup line services began running via Perth Underground and Esplanade station, marking the opening of those stations to passenger service. Mandurah line services commenced on 23 December 2007. The first train departed from Perth Underground station at 9 am.

=== Development above ===
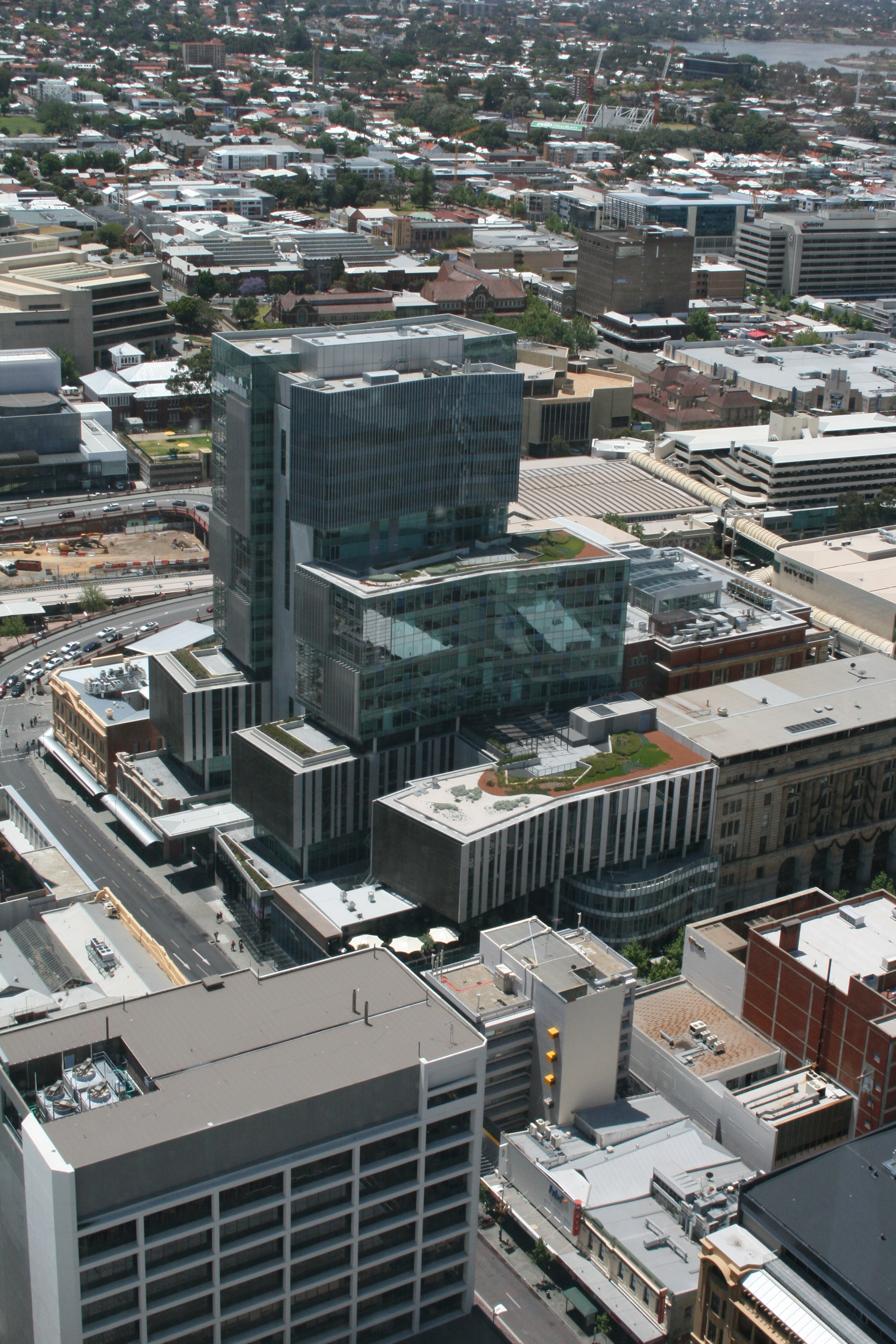
View of 140 William Street in 2012

140 William Street was developed following the completion of Perth Underground station. The tender process for the sale and redevelopment of the land began in September 2005. The process was managed by LandCorp in conjunction with the Western Australian Planning Commission. As an incentive, the state government committed to a 15-year lease of 22,000 square metres (240,000 sq ft) of office space within the future development. The developer chosen would have to come to a heritage agreement allowing for the retainment and integration of the Wellington Building, Globe Hotel, Baird's Building, and the Mitchell's Building façade within the development. Four developers were shortlisted in December 2005: Evolution Consortium (Cbus Property and Leighton Contractors), Grocon, Lendlease/Australian Prime Property Fund, and Multiplex. Each developer was issued with a request for proposal in March 2006, requiring them to submit their proposals by 28 June. The Evolution Consortium was chosen as the preferred proponent in September 2006, and by December 2006, the contract had been signed and the design revealed. The development was in total worth $200 million. By August 2007, construction had commenced, and in 2010, construction was completed.

=== Perth City Link ===
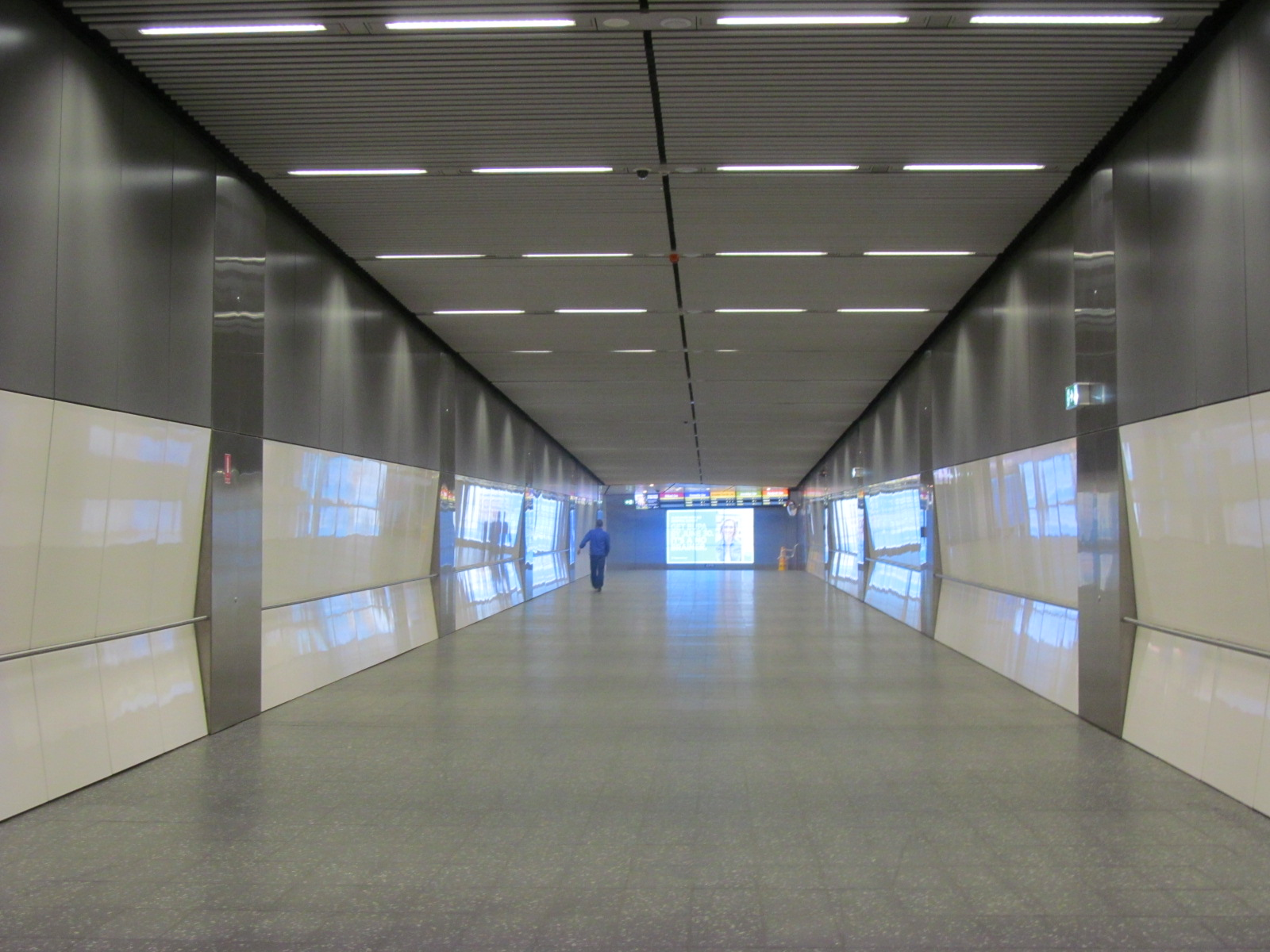
Pedestrian tunnel linking Perth Underground station with Perth station, constructed as part of the Perth City Link

As part of the Perth City Link project, a cut-and-cover pedestrian tunnel was constructed underneath Wellington Street linking Perth Underground station with Perth station. The tunnel's benefits were that it would cut the walk between Perth station and Perth Underground by up to 45 seconds and that it includes stairs, lifts and escalators to all of Perth station's platforms, eliminating the need for transferring passengers to traverse multiple sets of stairs, lifts or escalators. It was forecast that 22,600 passengers per day would transfer between Perth station and Perth Underground by 2031. The tunnel's construction was divided into stages; the stage linking Perth Underground with Perth station was stage two, which was planned to be constructed from mid-2012 to mid-2013 and open in late 2013. The tunnel ended up opening on 19 December 2013.

=== Other ===
The pedestrian tunnel from Perth Underground station to Raine Square opened in 2012.

The escalators at Perth Underground station, which were manufactured by Otis Worldwide, have had severe reliability issues since the station opened. In 2020, the escalators were replaced, seven years before the end of their expected life.

== Services ==
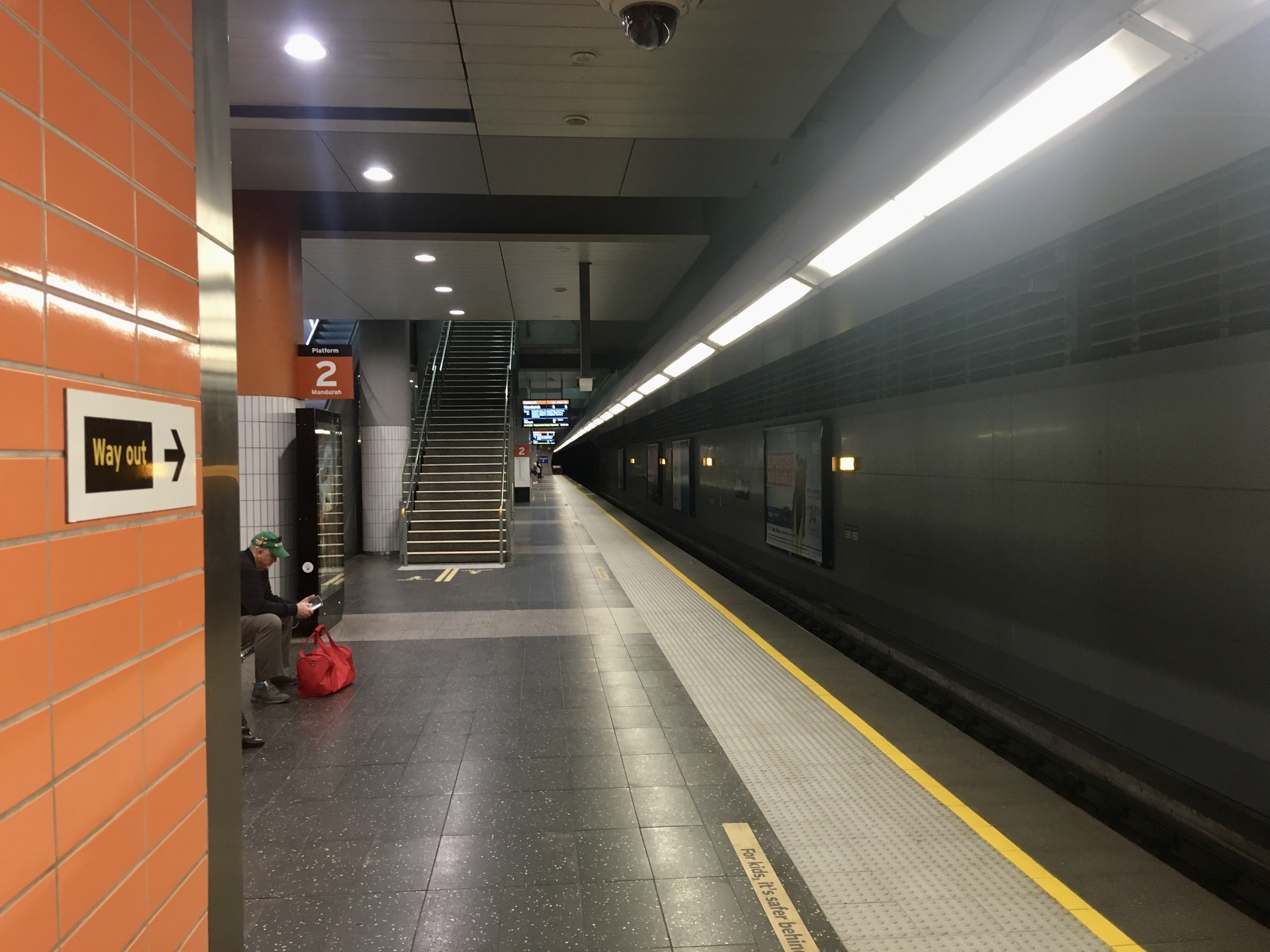
Perth Underground station platform

Perth Underground station is served by Transperth Yanchep line and Mandurah line services, which are operated by the PTA. The Yanchep and Mandurah lines form one continuous line. The service between Perth Underground and Elizabeth Quay stations is considered part of the Yanchep and Mandurah lines simultaneously. North of Perth Underground station are Yanchep line services and south of Elizabeth Quay station are Mandurah line services.

Yanchep and Mandurah line trains run at a five-minute frequency during peak hour and a fifteen-minute frequency outside peak and on weekends and public holidays. At night, trains are half-hourly or hourly. The earliest trains depart at 5:30 am on weekdays and Saturdays and 7:30 am on Sundays. The latest trains depart at 12:15 am on weeknights and 2:15 am on weekend nights.

In the 2013–14 financial year, Perth Underground station had 6,804,288 boardings for the Yanchep line and 5,614,273 boardings for the Mandurah line, for a total of 12,418,561 boardings.

=== Platforms ===
Perth Underground platform arrangement
| Stop ID | Platform | Line | Service Pattern | Destination | Via | Notes |
|---|---|---|---|---|---|---|
| 99601 | 1 | Mandurah line | All stations, W | Terminus | | Mandurah line services through run with Yanchep line services |
| 99601 | 1 | Yanchep line | All stations | Yanchep | | Mandurah line services through run with Yanchep line services |
| 99601 | 1 | Yanchep line | K | Clarkson | | Mandurah line services through run with Yanchep line services |
| 99601 | 1 | Yanchep line | W | Whitfords | | Mandurah line services through run with Yanchep line services |
| 99602 | 2 | Mandurah line | All stations | Mandurah | Murdoch | Between Perth Underground and Elizabeth Quay train services are simultaneously part of both the Mandurah and Yanchep lines |
| 99602 | 2 | Mandurah line | W | Cockburn | Murdoch | Between Perth Underground and Elizabeth Quay train services are simultaneously part of both the Mandurah and Yanchep lines |
| 99602 | 2 | Yanchep line | All stations, K, W | Elizabeth Quay | Perth Underground | Between Perth Underground and Elizabeth Quay train services are simultaneously part of both the Mandurah and Yanchep lines |
