= New Heart for Perth Society =

Former community association in Perth, Western Australia

Coordinates: 31°57′03″S 115°51′32″E

- New Heart for Perth Society
- Formation: 1968
- Dissolved: 1975
- Type: Community organisation
- Purpose: Public advocacy

The New Heart for Perth Society was a community association which advocated for the redevelopment of land on and around Perth Railway station as a civic centre for the city of Perth. The society was formed in 1968 and was active until the mid-1970s. City Planner Paul Ritter was a founding member.

Historian Robert Freestone describes the society as one of the more "sophisticated" community groups that arose around Australia in the late 1960s and exerted considerable political influence through the 1970s. The society was an active participant in public debate around proposals to sink the railway line and widen Forrest Place. It was a vigorous opponent of the state government's plan to allow a private company to sink the railway in exchange for development rights over the land.

== See also ==
- Perth City Link
- Perth Cultural Centre
