= Perth City Link =

Redevelopment project in Perth, Western Australia

Coordinates: 31.949°S 115.855°E

Artist's impression of the Perth City Link, viewed from the north. Yagan Square is visible on the left, transitioning to the King Square precinct, with Perth Arena on the far right.

Perth City Link is an urban renewal and redevelopment project in Perth, Western Australia.

The project – bounded by the Mitchell Freeway, Wellington Street, the Horseshoe Bridge and Roe Street – is on land that was once the Perth Marshalling Yard west of Perth railway station. The land was used by the railways and reserved for their use, from the 1880s until the late 1990s. At the time of early proposals, much of the space was no longer required by the railway.

The foundation project involved sinking a small section of the Fremantle railway line between the City and Northbridge and demolishing the old Wellington Street bus station. The construction of underground rail and a new underground bus station allowed for redevelopment of the 13.5 hectares (33 acres) of surface land that has been reclaimed. The rail works were completed in December 2013 and the Perth Busport opened in 2016.

== Transport ==
=== Rail ===
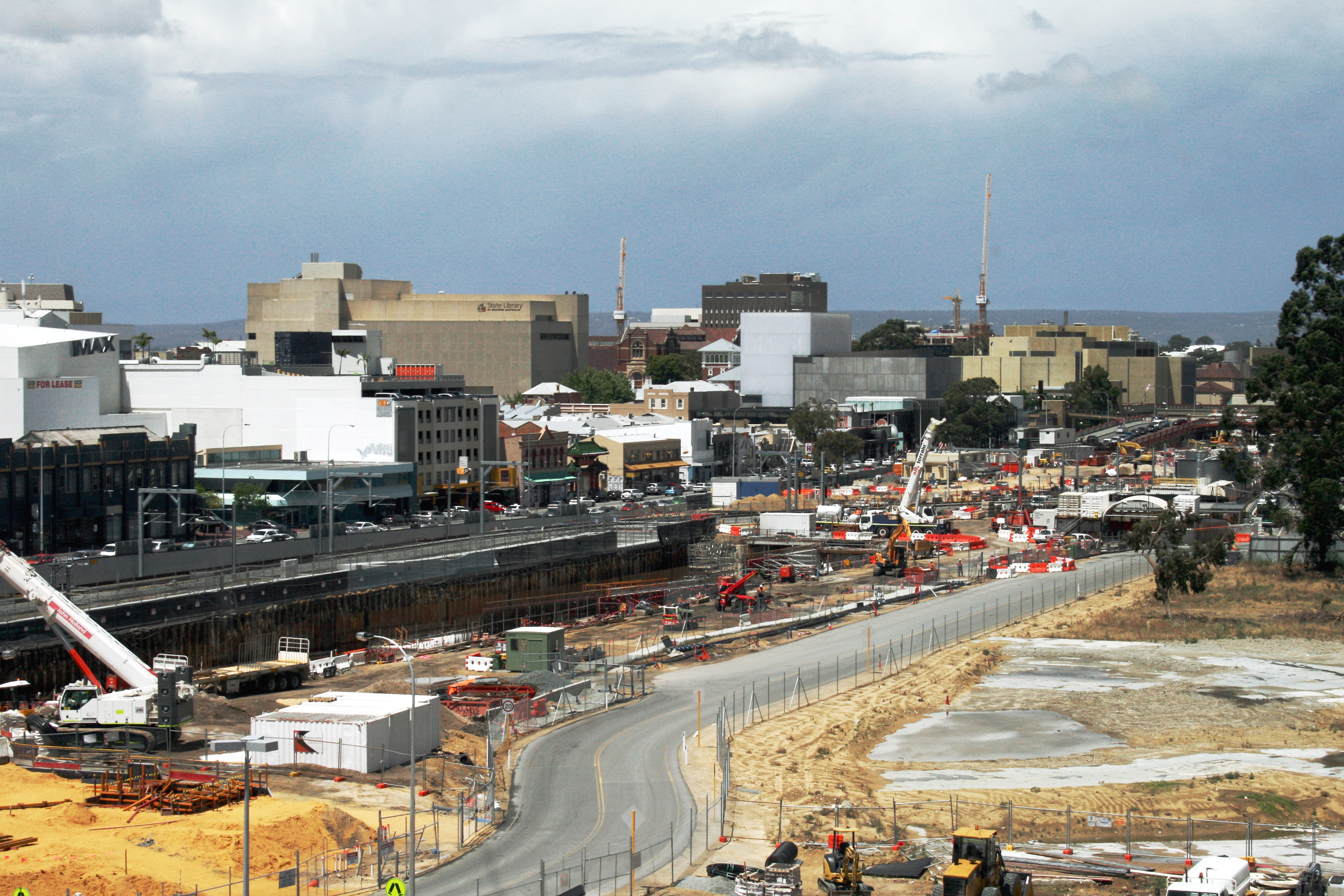
Construction works to sink the railway line in November 2012

The $360 million rail project was the first stage of the Perth City Link. The scope of works included:

- Sinking the Fremantle line between William Street and Lake/King Street. This created almost 600 m (2,000 ft) of a new covered section of the Fremantle line.
- Upgrading Perth station with new tiling, lighting and services and converting the existing Platform 9 into an island Platform 8/9.
- Creating a new tunnel under the northern end of the Barrack Street Bridge to service the new Platform 9.
- Extending the existing Joondalup line tunnel roof from Lake Street to Milligan Street to be in line with the new Fremantle line tunnel.
- Creating a new pedestrian underpass connecting Perth Underground station to all the platforms at Perth station.

Work commenced in 2010 with the project initially scheduled for completion in mid-2014. By early 2013 the project was running six months ahead of schedule.

Tunneling commenced on 31 January 2012, with Premier Colin Barnett, Transport Minister Troy Buswell, Lord Mayor Lisa Scaffidi and Senator Louise Pratt (representing Federal Infrastructure Minister Anthony Albanese) taking part in a ceremony in which several documents were placed in a time capsule and buried at the station, to be unearthed in 2031.

After a six-day shutdown, trains began running through the new tunnel on 18 July 2013.

The final part of the project, the pedestrian underpass, was officially opened on 19 December 2013, signaling the completion of the rail project, six months ahead of schedule.

=== Bus ===
The $249 million Perth Busport was the second stage of the Perth City Link. It involved the demolition of the Wellington Street bus station, which opened in 1973, and the construction of Australia's first dynamic stand allocation underground bus station at the same location. It opened on 17 July 2016.

== Precincts ==
=== The Arena ===
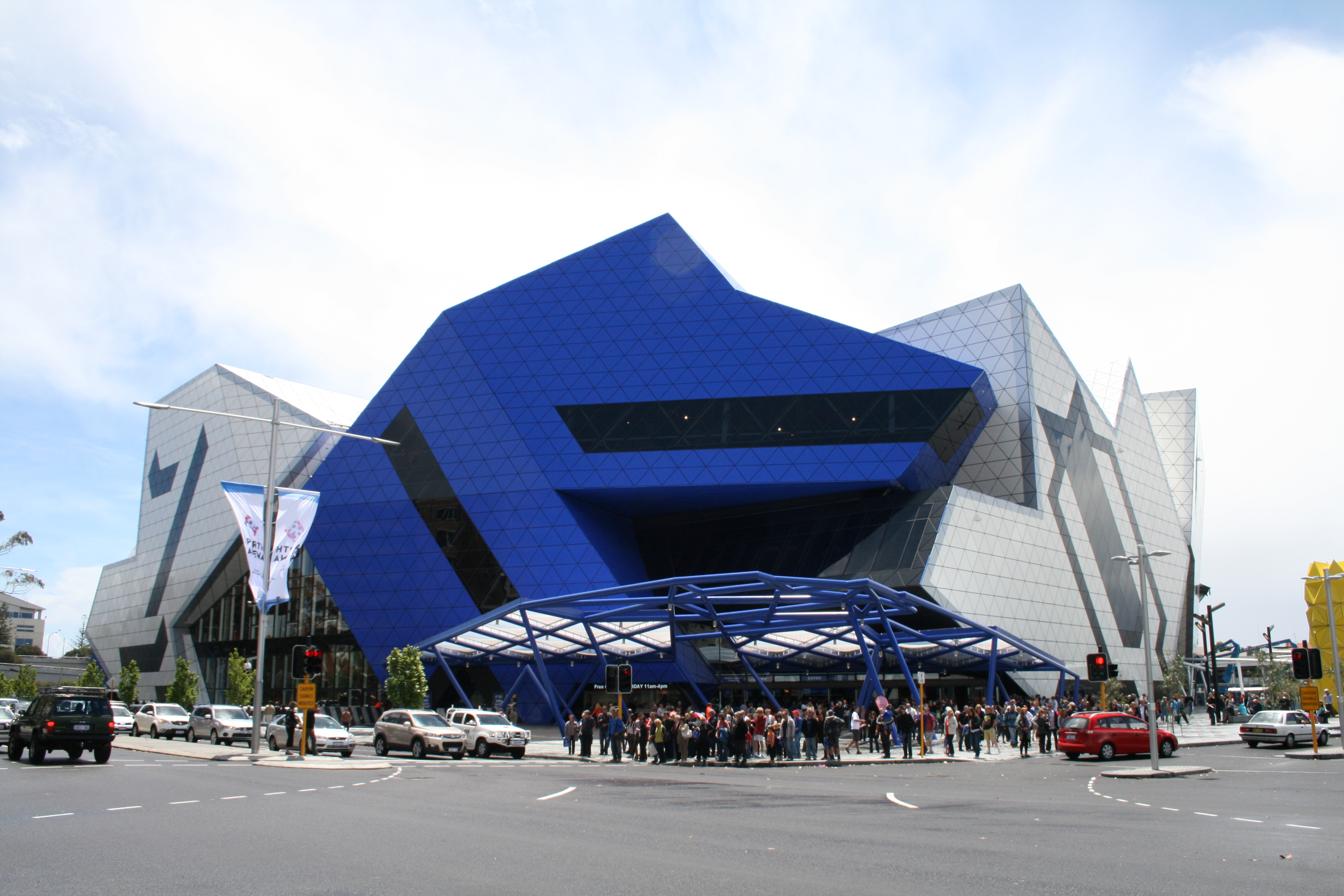
Perth Arena

Located at the western end of the site, this precinct centres around the Perth Arena.

=== King Square ===
In late January 2014 Leighton Properties started construction on the King Square precinct on the former Perth Entertainment Centre site. Four office buildings were constructed with Shell Australia, John Holland, P&N Bank and HBF as tenants. In May 2013, three of the buildings were sold to Dexus. The buildings (along with the precinct) were completed in December 2015 and tenanted by early 2016.

=== Yagan Square ===
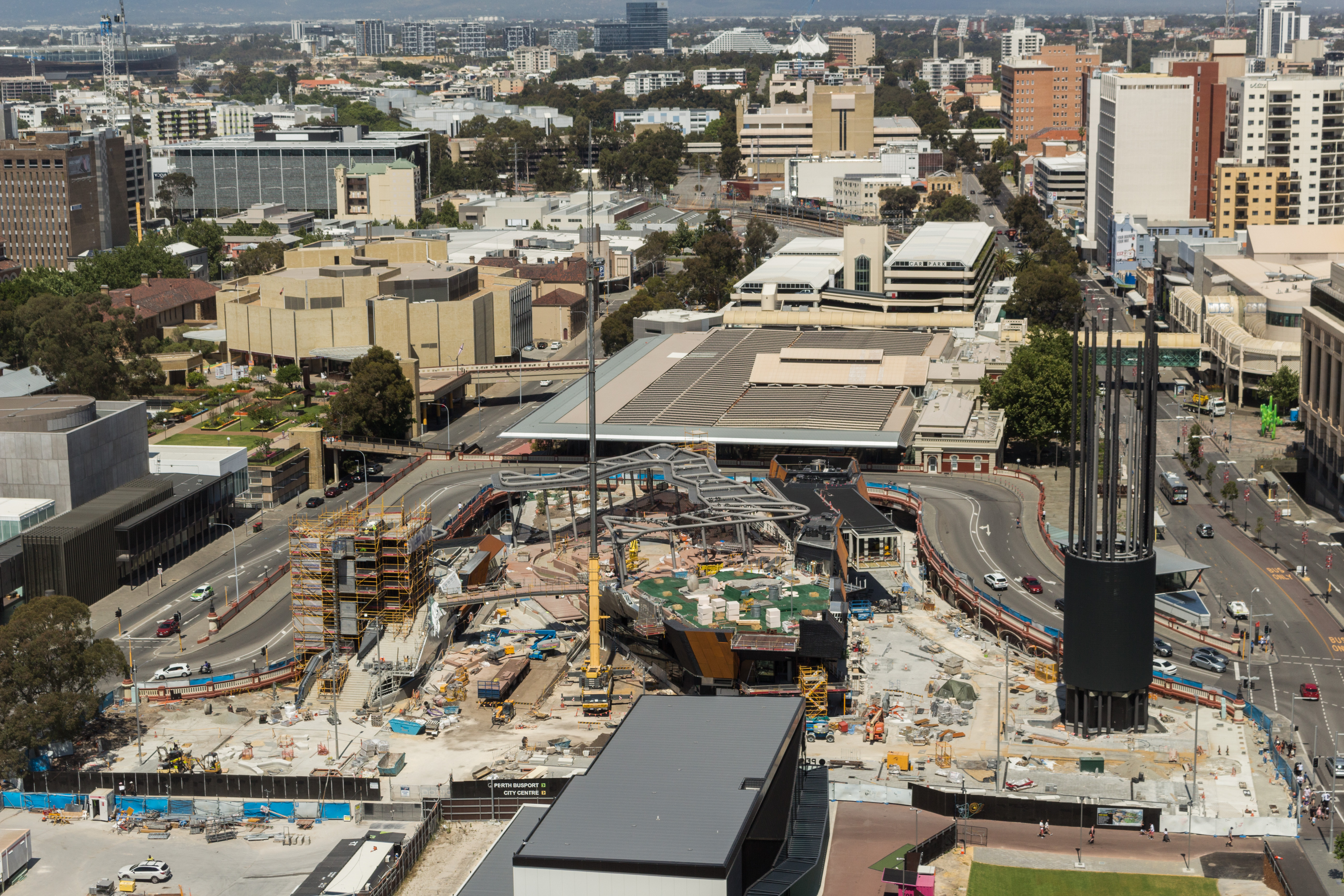
Yagan Square construction works in November 2017

Yagan Square, named after the Aboriginal warrior Yagan, is a 1-hectare (2.5-acre) public space located between the arms of the Horseshoe Bridge.

=== ECU City ===
ECU City is an inner city university campus for Edith Cowan University built as part of the Perth City Link project. It is situated to the west of Yagan Square. It was completed in late 2025 with classes beginning in early 2026.

== Previous proposals ==
In 1967 the government invited private developers, three internationally based, and one domestic group to submit proposals to place the railway underground, releasing 21 hectares (52 acres) for redevelopment. Financing issues and community opposition saw the project abandoned. In 1972 the government announced further plans to sink the railway, however this never eventuated.

Sinking the Fremantle line was also proposed to take place during the construction of the William Street tunnel for the Mandurah line, but this was abandoned due to the expense.
