= Perth Marshalling Yard =

Former rail yard in Perth, Western Australia

Location
- Location: Perth, Western Australia

Characteristics
- Owner: Western Australian Government Railways
- Operator: Western Australian Government Railways

History
- Closed: 2 October 1970

Perth Marshalling Yard was a marshalling yard to the west of Perth railway station in Perth, Western Australia.

The origins and development of the yard can be seen in considerations of the 1899 Royal Commission into the early stages of city railway traffic and the related joint select committee on the bridges over William Street (the Horseshoe Bridge) and Melbourne Road (which did not eventuate).

The yard included access to the Perth Metropolitan Markets and other adjacent industrial sites. It had three McKenzie & Holland mechnical lever interlocking signal boxes; box A with 27 levers, box B 120 levers and box C with 85 levers.

It closed on 2 October 1970 after the opening of Forrestfield Marhalling Yard. In April 1973, the Wellington Street bus station opened on part of the former yard.

Other parts of the yard were redeveloped as part of the Perth City Link project.
