= Kumagai Gumi =

Japanese construction company

Kumagai Gumi Co., Ltd.

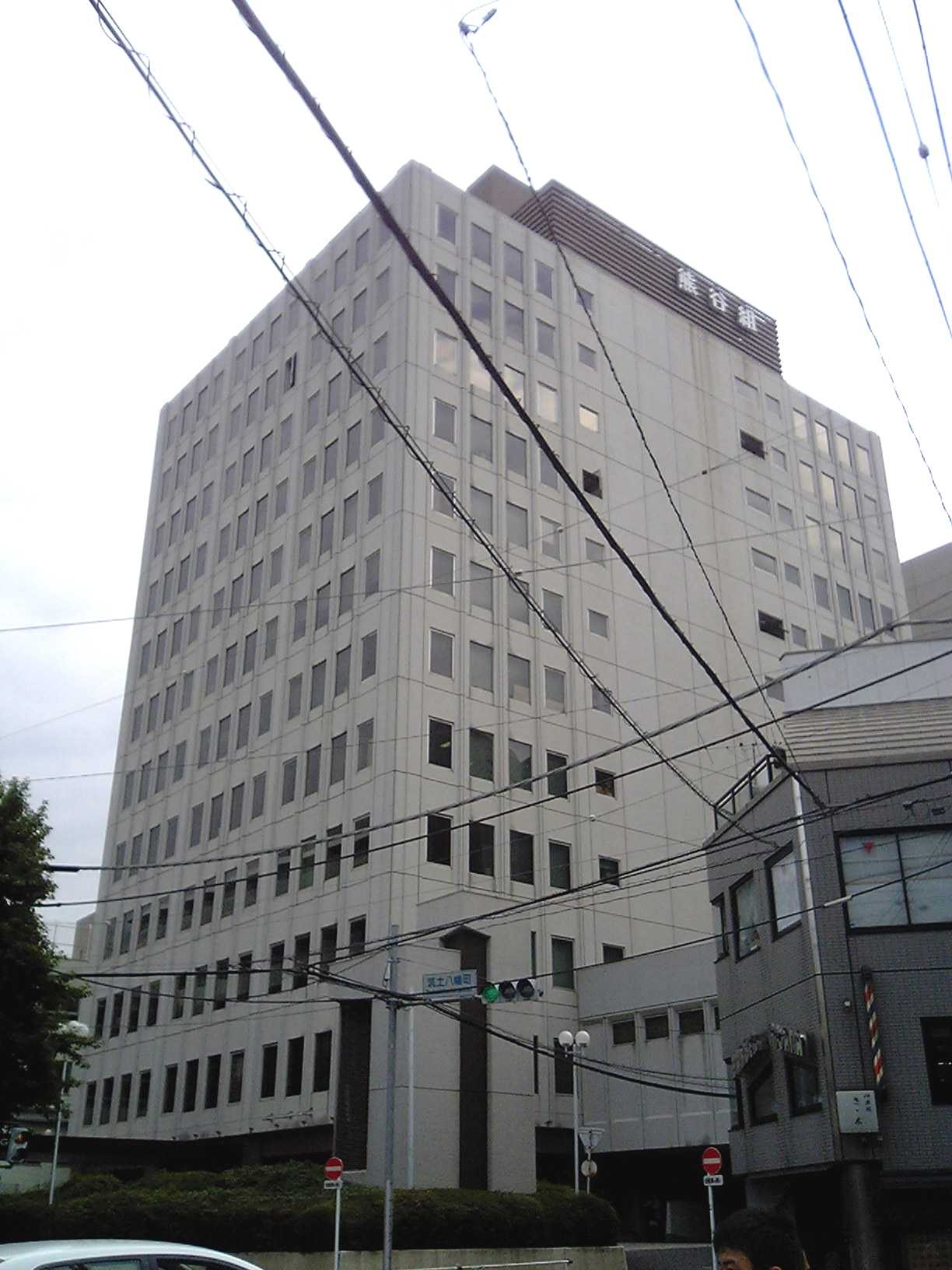
- Kumagai Gumi headquarters in Tokyo
- Native name: 株式会社熊谷組
- Company type: Public (K.K)
- Traded as: TYO: 1861
- ISIN: JP3266800006
- Industry: Construction; Engineering
- Founded: (January 1898, 01; 128 years ago) in Fukui, Japan
- Founder: Santaro Kumagai
- Headquarters: Shinjuku-ku, Tokyo 162-8557, Japan
- Area served: Worldwide
- Key people: Yasushi Higuchi (President)
- Products: Construction materials and equipment
- Services: Civil engineering design; Construction (civil engineering and building construction)
- Revenue: ▲JPY 344.7 billion (FY 2016) (US$ 3.07 billion) (FY 2016)
- Net income: ▲JPY 16.4 billion (FY 2016) (US$ 146 million) (FY 2016)
- Number of employees: 3,798 (as of March 31, 2016)
- Website: Official website

Kumagai Gumi Co., Ltd. (株式会社熊谷組, Kabushiki-gaisha Kumagai Gumi) is a Japanese construction company founded in Fukui, Fukui Prefecture, Japan. The company still has registered headquarters in Fukui, but the actual head office is located in Shinjuku, Tokyo.

== History ==
Santaro Kumagai, the company's founder, began his career as a civil servant in a police department. His construction career started as a stonemason, crafting religious monuments and performing work for the expanding railway network.

Kumagai founded his own company in 1898 and incorporated it in 1938. Between 1955 and 1983 the company accounted for more than 10% of all contracts awarded to the fifty-seven members of the Overseas Construction Association of Japan, a figure that outranked the ‘Big Five’ domestic giant construction companies. As overseas projects were riskier, these five companies were reluctant to expand beyond Japan. Kumagai Gumi took advantage of the situation and sought work overseas, as both as a construction company and a developer, using BOT as project financing, becoming one of the leading proponents of BOT in Southeast Asia. By 1985 overseas earnings amounted to 46% of Kumagai's total contracts.

In the 1980s the company became the largest Japanese real estate investor in New York City, investing in projects in Manhattan, including in projects developed by William Zeckendorf Jr.

== Major works ==
=== Dams and railways ===
- Tokuyama Dam – Ibigawa
- Mass Transit Railway – Hong Kong (numerous contracts)
- Delhi Metro Yellow line – Delhi
- Taipei Metro Bannan Line – Taipei
- Bangkok Metropolitan Rapid Transit Blue Line – Bangkok
- North East MRT line – Singapore
- East–West MRT line Changi Airport branch – Singapore
- Marmaray rail link – Istanbul
- Skitube – Snowy Mountains, Australia

=== Tunnels ===
- Water tunnel at Plover Cove – New Territories, Hong Kong
- Modified Initial System (section between Admiralty and Tsim Sha Tsui stations) – Victoria City and Kowloon, Hong Kong
- Seikan Tunnel – Aomori and Hakodate
- Eastern Harbour Crossing – Hong Kong
- Sydney Harbour Tunnel – Sydney
- Western Harbour Crossing – Hong Kong
- William Street tunnel – Perth
- Eagle's Nest Tunnel – Hong Kong
- Port Hedland Harbour Tunnel – Western Australia

=== Skyscrapers ===
- Taipei 101 – Taipei
- Bank of China Tower – Hong Kong
- Shun Hing Square – Shenzhen
- CITIC Plaza – Guangzhou
- Dayabumi Complex – Kuala Lumpur
- Bank of China Tower – Shanghai
- Melbourne Central – Melbourne

=== Hotels ===
- Çırağan Palace – Istanbul
