= Horseshoe Bridge =

Bridge in Perth, Western Australia

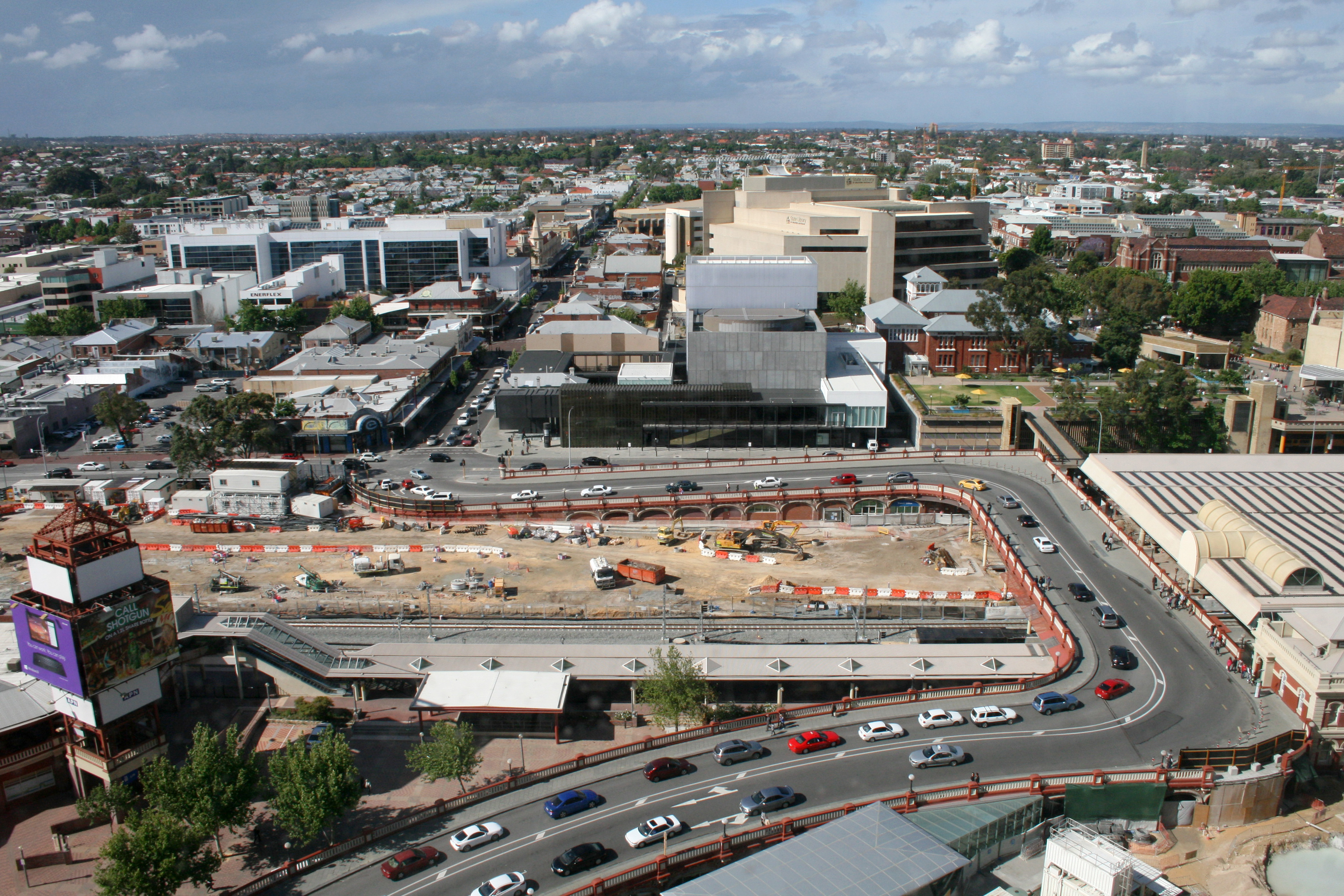
- Horseshoe Bridge in November 2012 with Perth City Link construction works happening under and adjacent to the bridge
- Coordinates: 31°57′03″S 115°51′34″E
- Carries: William Street
- Locale: Perth, Western Australia

Western Australia Heritage Register
- Type: State Registered Place
- Designated: 4 August 1992
- Reference no.: 2153

Location
- Moving across the railway Horseshoe Bridge (1) is situated west of Perth Station (2) and Barrack Street Bridge (3). Pedestrians may also pass between the Perth CBD and Northbridge across Yagan Square (4), and between the CBD and Perth Cultural Centre via Padbury Walk (5), Upper Level Walkway (6) and Gallery Walk (7). King Street (8) is further west. Interactive map of Horseshoe Bridge

The Horseshoe Bridge in Perth, Western Australia is a traffic bridge that connects the Perth CBD to Northbridge, carrying William Street. It was constructed in 1904 to pass over the Fremantle railway line, with the horseshoe shape designed to fit the approach ramps into a constricted site.

== Description ==
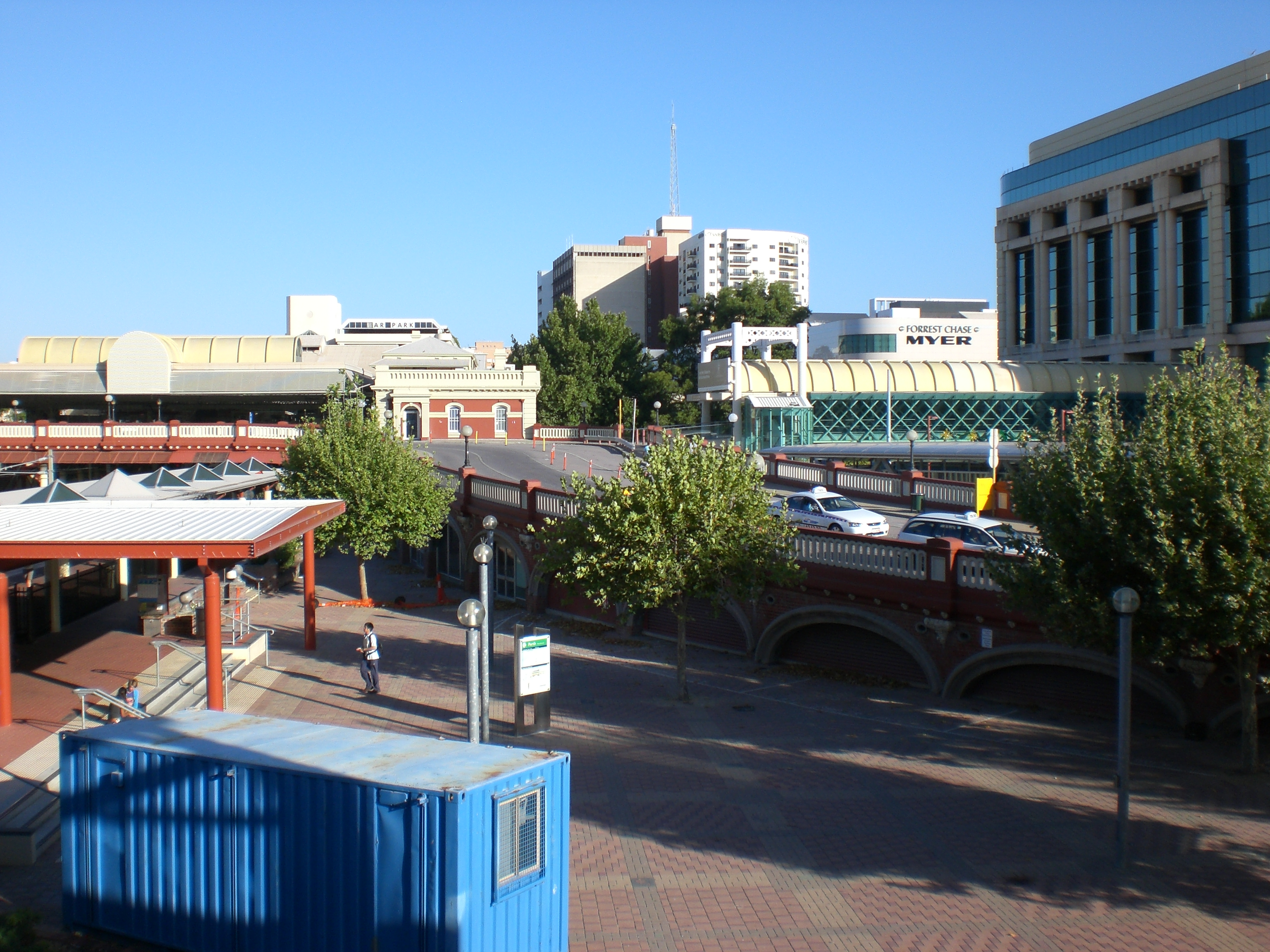
Looking southeast around 2008 across southern section of Horseshoe Bridge towards Forrest Place

The Horseshoe Bridge is a classically inspired brick and stucco traffic bridge located in the central business district of Perth, Western Australia. The bridge connects the Perth CBD to Northbridge by allowing traffic to continue along William Street and was originally designed to pass over the surface level railway lines that for many years existed to the west of Perth railway station. The bridge's name is derived from its shape: a horseshoe. This design was an innovative solution to the problem of bridging a railway within tight urban constraints.

The bridge is of urban design. The main structural elements of the bridge are of steel, and it is supported by a series of semi-circular arches with rendered decorative treatment. Many of the arches on the Wellington Street elevation have been enclosed with glass, which in the past created shop fronts to retail spaces behind. The balustrades are rendered concrete and sculptures of swans decorate the end piers. These were specifically designed for the bridge project.

The bridge is integrated with the rest of the street, and the winding form adds functionality to the Perth railway station precinct, and the architecture contributes to Wellington Street.

The bridge has four traffic lanes. The western footpath of the bridge has an entry point to Yagan Square. The eastern footpath formerly gave direct access to the train station which was later removed when it became a gated station.

== History ==
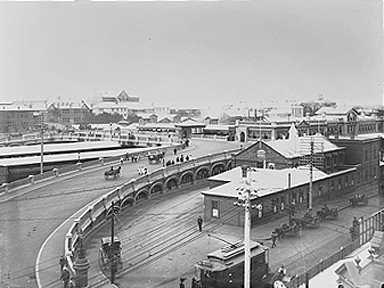
Looking over Horseshoe Bridge around 1904–1905 from southwestern corner of the Wellington and William streets intersection, where the Royal Hotel is as of 2019

The bridge was constructed in 1904 to reduce train-induced traffic congestion in William Street. During the last decade of the 19th century, WA's Engineer-in-Chief, C. Y. O'Connor, had overseen the construction of Perth's suburban railway system, which radiated out from a central railway station in Wellington Street in the city. As the line effectively cut the city off from its northern suburbs, a number of bridges and level crossings had to be built to connect the two areas. A bridge over the railway was constructed between Barrack and Beaufort Streets in 1894, as well as two pedestrian crossings, however by the mid 1890s there were seven lines and the William Street crossing was closed for most of the day as railway traffic continued to increase.

In a site with no land for approaches, the shape of the proposed William Street bridge was chosen as the only viable option for achieving the necessary gradients for horsedrawn vehicles. It was initially unpopular in some circles because it replaced the two pedestrian overpasses and the shape of the new bridge meant that pedestrians had to walk a great deal further to pass over the railway lines. Overall however, traffic increased strongly, with a favourable impact on the commercial development of William Street. Traffic could now pass between the northern and southern parts of the city independently of railway traffic and without the delays at the William Street crossing.

The bridge is one of the oldest surviving bridges in central Perth. Structurally it has been modified to accommodate heavier vehicles, but the work has been undertaken in a manner that preserves the authenticity of the original design. The bridge enjoys heritage recognition, including listings on the Heritage Council's State Register of Heritage Places, the Register of the National Estate, City of Perth's Municipal Inventory and the National Trust.

In 1986, the bridge carried approximately 18,000 vehicles per day into the city. The bridge was closed on 30 November 2009 for restoration and conversion to two-way traffic. It was expected to remain closed for four months. The bridge was reopened with two-way traffic on 26 June 2010, just under three months later than originally planned.

In the early 2010s the Perth City Link project sunk the railway lines the bridge was originally designed to pass over, with Yagan Square constructed atop the now freed up land to the immediate west of the bridge. Despite this, the Horseshoe Bridge still remains as a major traffic link into the CBD.

== See also ==
- Barrack Street Bridge
