= Melbourne Street, Perth =

Street in Perth, Western Australia

Coordinates: 31.9474°S 115.8547°E

Melbourne Street Western Australia
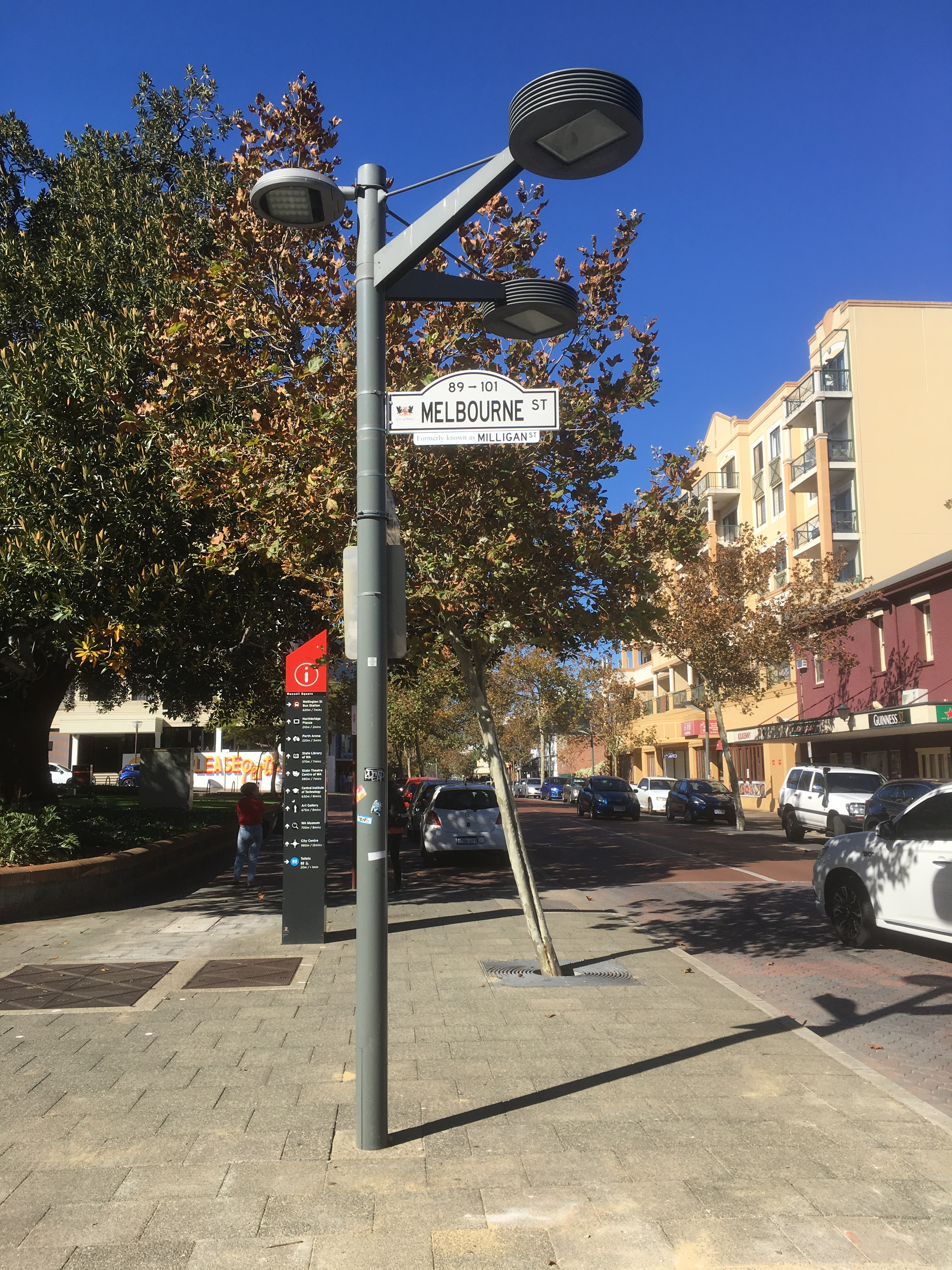
- Street sign - Melbourne Street

General information
- Type: Street
- Length: 120 m (400 ft)

Major junctions
- South end: Roe Street
- North end: James Street

Location(s)
- Suburb(s): Northbridge

Melbourne Street is a street in Northbridge, Western Australia that runs between Roe and James Streets. The current street is a part of an older and longer street that at one time extended from Murray Street to what is now Aberdeen Street. It is named after Lord Melbourne, the British prime minister in the 1830s, when the street was originally built.

== History ==
Melbourne Street appears in maps of Perth from as early as 1838, running from Murray Street north to Lamb Street (now Aberdeen Street). By 1845 Russell Square had been constructed and Melbourne Street terminated at James Street. In 1923 Melbourne Road (Note: Most early maps show Melbourne Street, but Government Gazettes and newspaper articles typically refer to Melbourne Road.) was renamed to Milligan Street and deemed an extension of the existing street of that name when the Perth City Council adopted a committee recommendation:

That the name of Melbourne-road be altered to Milligan-street, and that the present Milligan-street and the present Melbourne-road be then regarded as one thoroughfare.

However the name Melbourne Road continued to be used at least until the 1940s.

Melbourne Street was originally continuous between Murray and James Streets but it was closed between Wellington and Roe Streets in 1911. (Note: A Perth City Link newsletter says that the (then Milligan Street) level crossing was closed in the 1930s, but maps from 1918 and 1925 show the road as being closed.) The road was removed in 1974, when the Perth Entertainment Centre was built.

In December 2017 the City of Perth Council agreed to a request from Landgate and the portion of Milligan Street between Roe and James Streets was renamed back to Melbourne Street.

== Intersections ==
LGA	Location	km	mi	Destinations	Notes
Perth	Northbridge - Perth boundary	0	0.0	Roe Street	Traffic light controlled
Perth	Northbridge	0.12	0.075	James Street	Give way sign controlled, giving James Street priority
1.000 mi = 1.609 km; 1.000 km = 0.621 mi
