= Michelides Tobacco Factory =

Art deco building in Perth, Western Australia

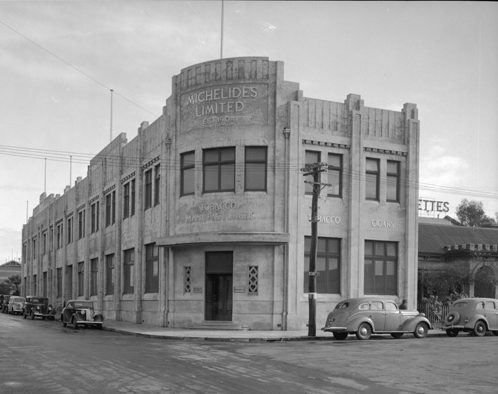
- Michelides Tobacco Factory c. 1940
- Interactive map of the Michelides Tobacco Factory area
- Alternative names: Peters Ice Cream Factory; Tony Barlow Menswear Building

General information
- Status: Demolished
- Type: Industrial, commercial
- Architectural style: Art Deco
- Location: 1 Lake Street; 92-98 Roe Street, Northbridge, Western Australia, Australia
- Coordinates: 31.948°S 115.856°E
- Construction started: 1922
- Completed: 1923
- Opened: 5 October 1922
- Renovated: 1934, 1936
- Demolished: 2014
- Client: Michelides Ltd
- Owner: Pelworth Pty Ltd

Technical details
- Floor count: 2

Renovating team
- Architects: Oldham, Boas and Ednie-Brown (1934, 1936)
- Renovating firm: W. Fairbrother and Son (1936)

The Michelides Tobacco Factory building was an Interwar Art Deco building in Northbridge, Western Australia constructed in stages between the early 1920s and mid-1930s. The building was later known as the Peters Ice Cream Factory and the Tony Barlow Menswear Building. At the time of demolition, the factory was the only extant industrial building in Perth to be remodelled into the Art Deco style.

== Construction ==
The first stage of the factory was constructed in 1922 by Michelides Ltd, a Western Australian tobacco company. The Premier of Western Australia, Sir James Mitchell opened the original factory in October 1922.

In 1934 a two storey extension to the factory was built on Roe Street next to the 1922 building. The extension was designed by the architecture firm Oldham, Boas and Ednie-Brown in the Art Deco style.

In 1936 the 1922 building on the corner of Lake and Roe Street was upgraded. This building was integrated with the 1934 building to form a single building. This addition was again designed by Oldham, Boas and Ednie-Brown.

== Land use ==
The factory was built by Michelides Ltd, a company who grew tobacco and produced tobacco products. Prior to construction of the factory the Michelides had produced hand-made cigarettes, but with the introduction of mechanisation were able to increase their market share.

With the decline of the local tobacco industry, harvesting of tobacco ceased in late 1959, and cigarette production ceased early in 1960. The factory later became part of the Peters Ice Cream factory. The ice cream factory had started out on the corner of Milligan and Roe Streets and expanded its operations to take in the former tobacco factory.

After the departure of Peters for a site in Balcatta, the site was leased to Tony Barlow Menswear. The retailer left the building in 2009 after 20 years in Northbridge.

== Heritage and demolition ==
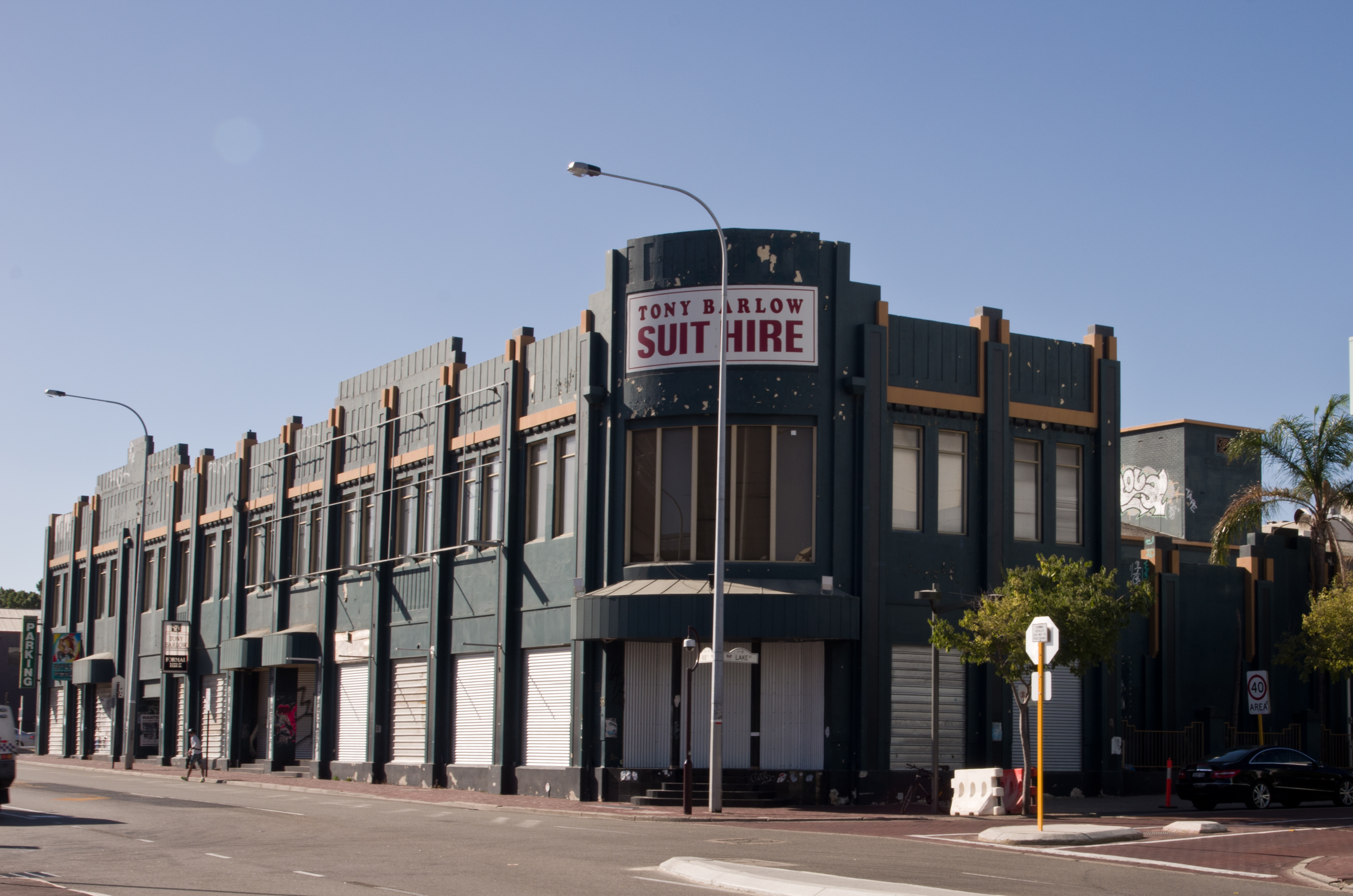
The building on 1 February 2014

In 2009 the City of Perth approved the demolition of the building suggesting that the art deco façade was not genuine and had been added in the 1980s. The approval was granted despite the proposed replacement building being twice the council's height limit. The development approval lapsed before the demolition could take place.

The building was classified by the National Trust of Australia in 2013.

In 2013 the Western Australian Heritage Minister decided against state heritage protection for the building.

The City of Perth council in January 2014 again approved the demolition of the factory, citing the lack of state heritage listing. This was despite a concerted effort by heritage groups, along with a social media campaign led by online history group "Museum of Perth", to save the building.
