= Milligan Street, Perth =

Road in Perth, Western Australia

Milligan Street, Perth Western Australia
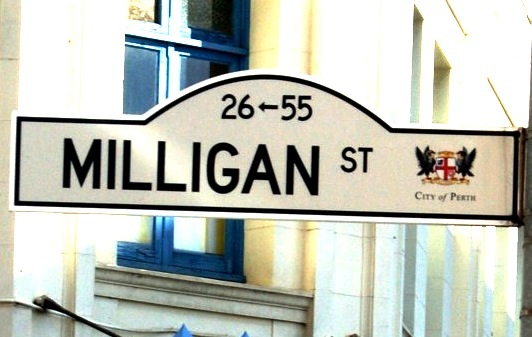
- Street sign - Milligan Street

General information
- Type: Street
- Length: 530 m (0.3 mi)

Major junctions
- South end: St Georges Terrace
- Hay Street; Murray Street
- North end: Wellington Street
Spur section
- South-west end: Milligan Street (main section)
- North-east end: Wellington Street

Location(s)
- Suburb(s): Perth, Northbridge

Milligan Street is a street in Perth, Western Australia that runs from St Georges Terrace to north of Wellington Street. The northern section provides access to the Perth Arena carpark and Telethon Avenue; there are also dedicated Transperth bus roads connecting to the northern end, south of the Fremantle railway line.

A small side-street of the same name branches off the east side of Milligan Street between Murray and Wellington Streets, and forms a second intersection with Wellington Street.

== History ==
Milligan Street appears in maps of Perth from as early as 1838, running from what is now Spring Street to Murray. It was named after Dr William Lane Milligan, the original owner of the land on the southern end of Milligan Street, south of St Georges Terrace.

In 1863 the section of Milligan Street south of St Georges Terrace was rezoned and transferred to Matthew Hale, the Anglican Bishop of Perth. By 1894 Milligan Street extended north to Wellington Street.

=== Melbourne Street ===
The small side-street between Murray and Wellington Streets was originally part of a separate (although intersecting) thoroughfare named Melbourne Street that ran north-east from the corner of Milligan and Murray Streets, past Wellington and Roe Streets, and (in 1845) to James Street.

In 1923 Melbourne Road (Note: Most early maps show Melbourne Street, but Government Gazettes and newspaper articles typically refer to Melbourne Road.) was renamed to Milligan Street and the two were considered a single road when the Perth City Council adopted a committee recommendation:

That the name of Melbourne-road be altered to Milligan-street, and that the present Milligan-street and the present Melbourne-road be then regarded as one thoroughfare.

However the name Melbourne Road continued to be used at least until the 1940s.

In December 2017 the City of Perth Council agreed to a request from Landgate and the portion of Milligan Street between Roe and James Streets was renamed back to Melbourne Street.

==== Separation ====
Melbourne Street was originally continuous between Murray and James Streets but it was closed between Wellington and Roe Streets in 1911. (Note: A Perth City Link newsletter says that the level crossing was closed in the 1930s, but maps from 1918 and 1925 show the road as being closed.) The road was removed in 1974, when the Perth Entertainment Centre was built.
