= Melbourne Street =

Melbourne Street may refer to:

- Melbourne Street, North Adelaide, Australia
- Melbourne Street, Perth, Australia
