= Perth (suburb) =

- Suburb
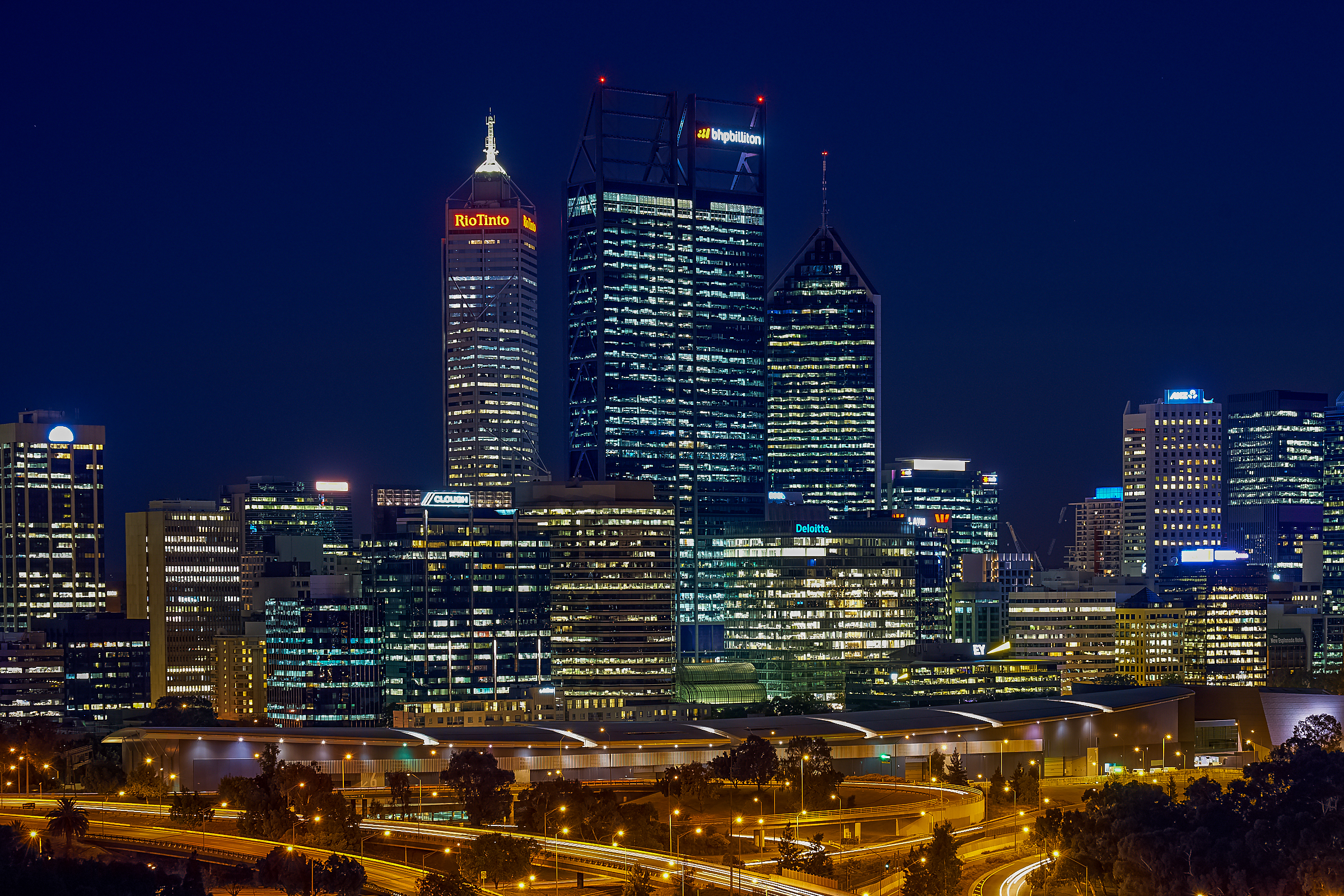
- Perth central business district
- Interactive map of Perth
- Coordinates: 31.95°S 115.85°E
- Country: Australia
- State: Western Australia
- City: Perth
- LGA: City of Perth City of Vincent
- Established: 1829

Government
  - State electorate: Perth
  - Federal division: Perth

Area
  - Total: 4.6 km^{2} (1.8 sq mi)

Population
  - Total: 13,670 (SAL 2021)
- Postcode: 6000
Suburbs around Perth
North Perth	North Perth	Highgate
Northbridge	Perth	East Perth
West Perth	South Perth	Victoria Park

Perth is a suburb in the Perth metropolitan region, Western Australia that includes both the central business district of the city, and a suburban area spreading north to the northern side of Hyde Park. It does not include the separate suburbs of Northbridge or Highgate. Perth is split between the City of Perth and the City of Vincent local authorities, and was named after the city of the same name in Scotland.

== Built environment ==
The dominant land use in Perth is commercial. Office buildings include 108 St Georges Terrace, QV1, Brookfield Place and Central Park – the tallest building in the city and the tenth tallest in Australia.

=== Significant buildings ===
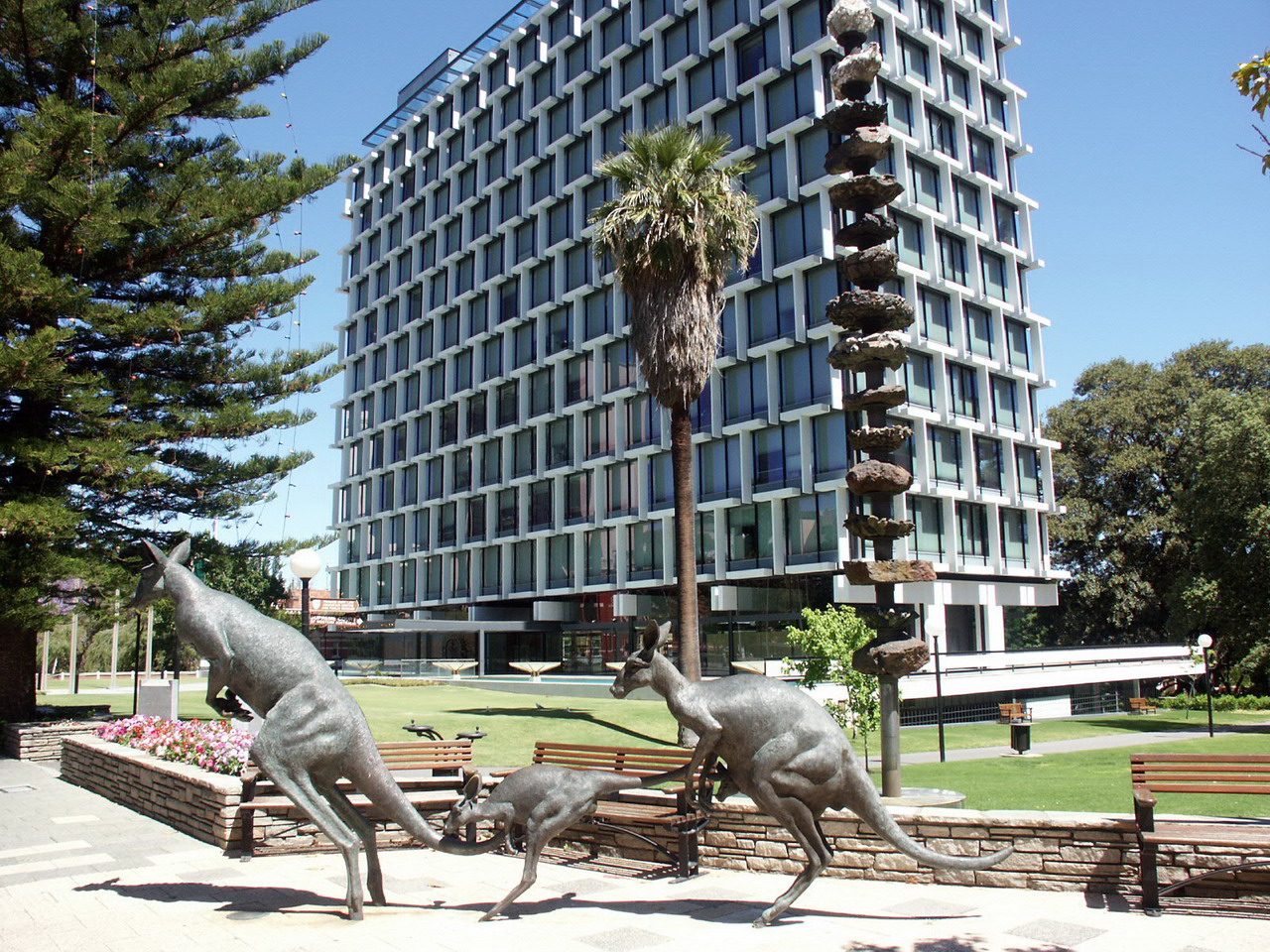
Council House, Perth

The Perth Town Hall, built between 1868 and 1870, was designed as an administrative centre for the newly formed City of Perth. By the late 1950s the Town Hall was considered too small for the council's requirements so Council House, a modernist steel and glass building, was commissioned. Completed in 1960, Council House has divided opinions over its architectural merit. Both the Town Hall and Council House are on the Register of the National Estate.

Forrest Chase is a significant shopping precinct in the Perth central business district. It dates back over 120 years to the retail days of Perth department store Boans, and has seen many refurbishments, iterations and additions.

== Demographics ==
In the 2016 census, there were 11,425 people living in the suburb of Perth. 34.7% of people were born in Australia. The next most common countries of birth were England 5.4%, China 4.0%, India 2.6%, New Zealand 2.5% and Malaysia 2.3%. 50.8% of people spoke only English at home. Other languages spoken at home included Mandarin 6.6%, Cantonese 2.3%, Italian 2.3%, Korean 2.0% and Vietnamese 1.7%. The most common response for religion was "no religion" at 38.0%.

== Arts and culture ==
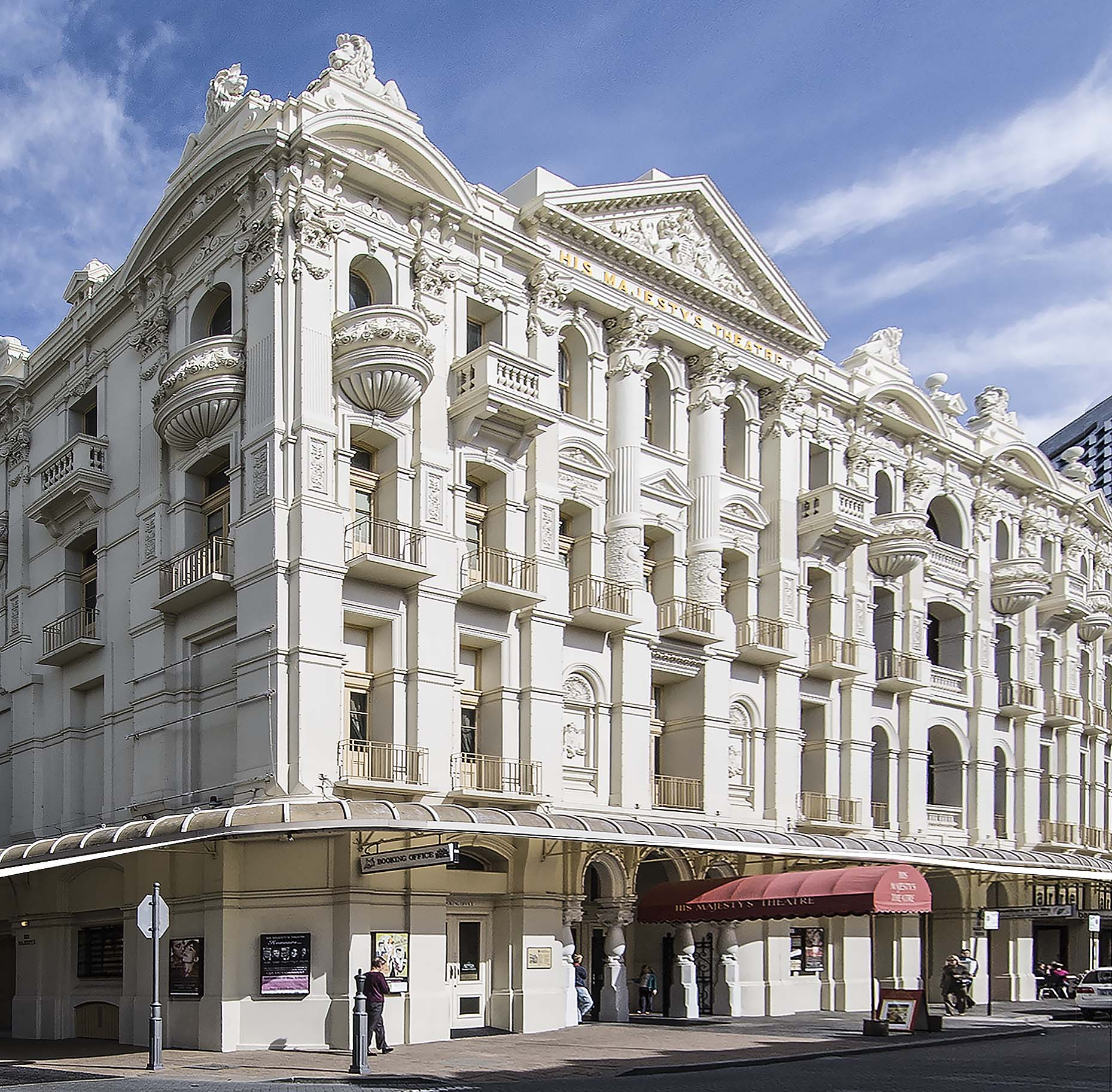
His Majesty's Theatre, corner of Hay and King Streets.

The Perth Cultural Centre includes facilities such as the Art Gallery of Western Australia, the State Library of Western Australia, the State Theatre Centre of Western Australia and the Western Australian Museum. The Perth Concert Hall is located on St Georges Terrace and His Majesty's Theatre on Hay Street.

== Education ==
Three educational institutions are located within the suburb: St George's Anglican Grammar School, Kingston International College, and the Central Institute of Technology.

== Sports and recreation ==
Sporting facilities in the suburb include Perth Oval, the home ground of association football (soccer) team Perth Glory and Super Rugby team Western Force. Between 1910 and 1999 it was the home of Australian rules football team East Perth, who are now based at Leederville Oval.

At the western end of Wellington Street is the Perth Arena, an indoor stadium designed to host indoor sports such as tennis and basketball. It's the current home of the Perth Wildcats.

The Perth Entertainment Centre, which was located adjacent to the new Arena, was the home court for the Perth Wildcats between 1990 and 2002.

Tennis clubs are located at Robertson Park and Loton Park.

== Transport ==
Three freeways service the suburb – Mitchell Freeway, Kwinana Freeway and Graham Farmer Freeway. Public transport facilities include three train stations (Perth railway station, McIver railway station, Elizabeth Quay railway station) and two bus stations (Elizabeth Quay Bus Station and Perth Busport), as well as the East Perth Terminal, servicing intrastate and interstate rail and bus services. The Elizabeth Quay Jetty is the home of Transperth ferry services. Perth is served by four free Central Area Transit (CAT) bus routes and a number of open and high rise public car parks.

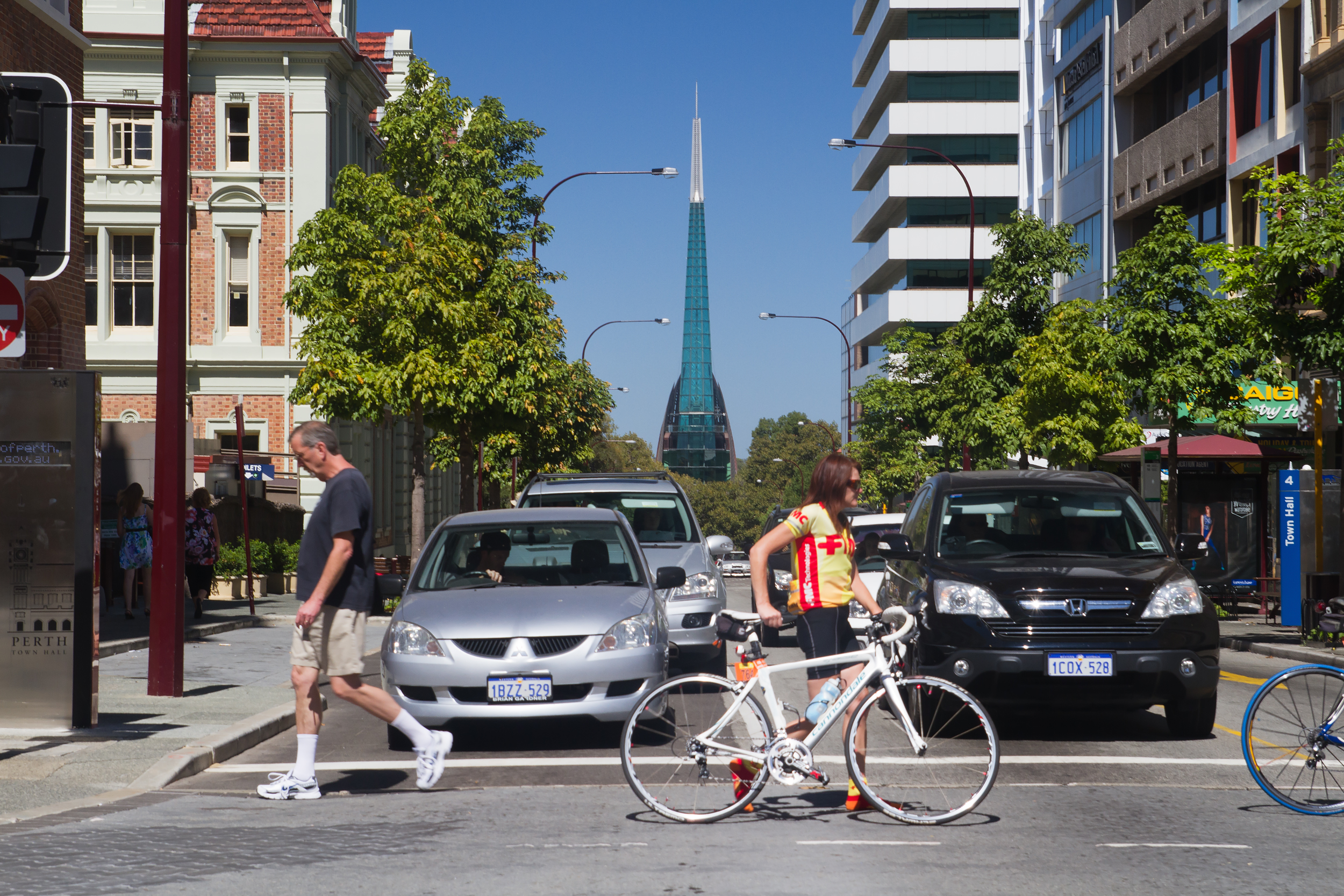
Looking down towards the Swan Bells on Barrack Street

The main east–west streets through the city block are St Georges Terrace, Hay Street, Murray Street and Wellington Street. The main north–south streets are Barrack Street and William Street. Five streets have had sections converted to pedestrian malls: Murray Street, Hay Street, James Street, Museum Street and Forrest Place.

=== Bus ===
==== Bus stations ====
- Elizabeth Quay Bus Station
- Perth Busport

==== Bus routes ====
- Blue CAT Perth Busport to Kings Park (free service) – serves Aberdeen Street, Beaufort Street, Barrack Street, Perth Station, Barrack Square, Elizabeth Quay Bus Station and St Georges Terrace
- Red CAT Matagarup Bridge to Matagarup Bridge (free service) – Circular Route, serves Hay Street, Wellington Street, Perth Station, William Street, Perth Underground Station, Murray Street and Goderich Street
- 19 Perth Busport to Flinders Square – serves Fitzgerald Street
- 23 Elizabeth Quay Bus Station to Claremont Station – serves Mounts Bay Road
- 30 Perth Busport to Curtin University Bus Station – serves Milligan Street, St Georges Terrace and Elizabeth Quay Bus Station
- 31 Perth Busport to Salter Point – serves Milligan Street, St Georges Terrace and Elizabeth Quay Bus Station
- 34 Perth Busport to Cannington Station – serves William Street and Elizabeth Quay Bus Station
- 66 Elizabeth Quay Bus Station to Galleria Bus Station (limited stops) – serves William Street, Perth Underground Station, Wellington Street, Perth Station and Beaufort Street
- 67 and 68 Perth Busport to Mirrabooka Bus Station – serve Wellington Street, Perth Station and Beaufort Street
- 910 Perth Busport to Fremantle Station (high frequency) – serves Milligan Street, St Georges Terrace and Adelaide Terrace
- 950 Queen Elizabeth II Medical Centre to Galleria Bus Station (high frequency) – serves Mounts Bay Road, Elizabeth Quay Bus Station, William Street, Perth Underground Station, Wellington Street, Perth Station and Beaufort Street
- 960 Curtin University Bus Station to Mirrabooka Bus Station (high frequency) – serves Wellington Street, Perth Station, Perth Busport and Fitzgerald Street
- 980 Elizabeth Quay Bus Station to Galleria Bus Station (high frequency) – serves William Street, Perth Underground Station, Wellington Street, Perth Station, Beaufort Street and Newcastle Street
- 995 Elizabeth Quay Bus Station to Claremont Station (high frequency) – serves Mounts Bay Road

Bus routes serving Elizabeth Quay Bus Station only:

- 35 Elizabeth Quay Bus Station to Old Mill
- 114 Elizabeth Quay Bus Station to Lake Coogee
- 115 Elizabeth Quay Bus Station to Hamilton Hill Memorial Hall
- 158 Elizabeth Quay Bus Station to Fremantle Station

Bus routes serving Elizabeth Quay Bus Station, St Georges Terrace and Adelaide Terrace:

- 32 Elizabeth Quay Bus Station to Como
- 33 Elizabeth Quay Bus Station to Curtin Central Bus Station
- 39 Elizabeth Quay Bus Station to Redcliffe Station
- 72 and 177 Elizabeth Quay Bus Station to Cannington Station
- 75 Elizabeth Quay Bus Station to Canning Vale
- 111 and 160 Fremantle Station to WACA Ground
- 178 and 179 Elizabeth Quay Bus Station to Bull Creek Station
- 270 Elizabeth Quay Bus Station to High Wycombe Station
- 282 and 283 Elizabeth Quay Bus Station to Kalamunda Bus Station
- 930 Elizabeth Quay Bus Station to Thornlie Station (high frequency)
- 940 Elizabeth Quay Bus Station to Redcliffe Station (high frequency)

Bus routes serving Perth Busport only:

- 15 Perth Busport to Glendalough Station
- 360 and 361 Perth Busport to Alexander Heights Shopping Centre (limited stops)
- 362 Perth Busport to Ballajura (limited stops)
- 370 Perth Busport to Mirrabooka Bus Station (limited stops)
- 384 Perth Busport to Mirrabooka Bus Station
- 385 Perth Busport to Kingsway City (limited stops)
- 386 Perth Busport to Kingsway City
- 387 and 388 Perth Busport to Warwick Station
- 389 Perth Busport to Wanneroo
- 402 and 403 Perth Busport to Stirling Station
- 404 Perth Busport to Osborne Park
- 970 Perth Busport to Mirrabooka Bus Station (high frequency)
- 990 Perth Busport to Scarborough Beach Bus Station (high frequency)

Bus routes serving St Georges Terrace:

- Green CAT Elizabeth Quay Bus Station to Leederville Station (free service)
- Purple CAT Elizabeth Quay Bus Station to University of Western Australia (free service)
- 103 Elizabeth Quay Bus Station to Claremont Station

Bus routes serving St Georges Terrace and Adelaide Terrace:

- 24 Claremont Station to Point Fraser
- 27 Claremont Station to East Perth
- 935 Kings Park to Redcliffe Station (high frequency)

Bus routes serving Wellington Street:

- 28 Perth Busport to Claremont Station
- 81, 82, 83 and 84 Perth Busport to City Beach
- 85 Perth Busport to Glendalough Station

Bus routes serving Wellington Street and Perth Station:

- Yellow CAT Claisebrook Station to Perth Modern School (free service) – serves Wellington Street and Perth Station
- 38 Perth Busport to Cloverdale
- 51 Perth Busport to Cannington Station
- 220 Perth Busport to Armadale Station
- 221 Perth Busport to Armadale Station (limited stops)
- 230 Perth Busport to Thornlie Station (limited stops)
- 907 Perth Busport to Armadale Station (high frequency / limited stops)

Bus routes serving William Street, Perth Underground Station, Wellington Street, Perth Station, Beaufort Street, Newcastle Street and Lord Street:

- 40 Elizabeth Quay Bus Station to Galleria Bus Station
- 41 Elizabeth Quay Bus Station to Bayswater Station
- 42 and 43 Elizabeth Quay Bus Station to Maylands Boat Ramp

=== Rail ===
- Midland, Airport, Armadale, Thornlie–Cockburn, Fremantle, Yanchep and Mandurah lines
  - Perth Station
  - McIver Station
  - East Perth Station
  - Perth Underground Station
  - Elizabeth Quay Station
