= Cathedral of Saints Constantine and Helene =

Church in Perth, Western Australia

- Greek: Καθεδρικός Ναός Αγίων Κωνσταντίνου και Ελένης
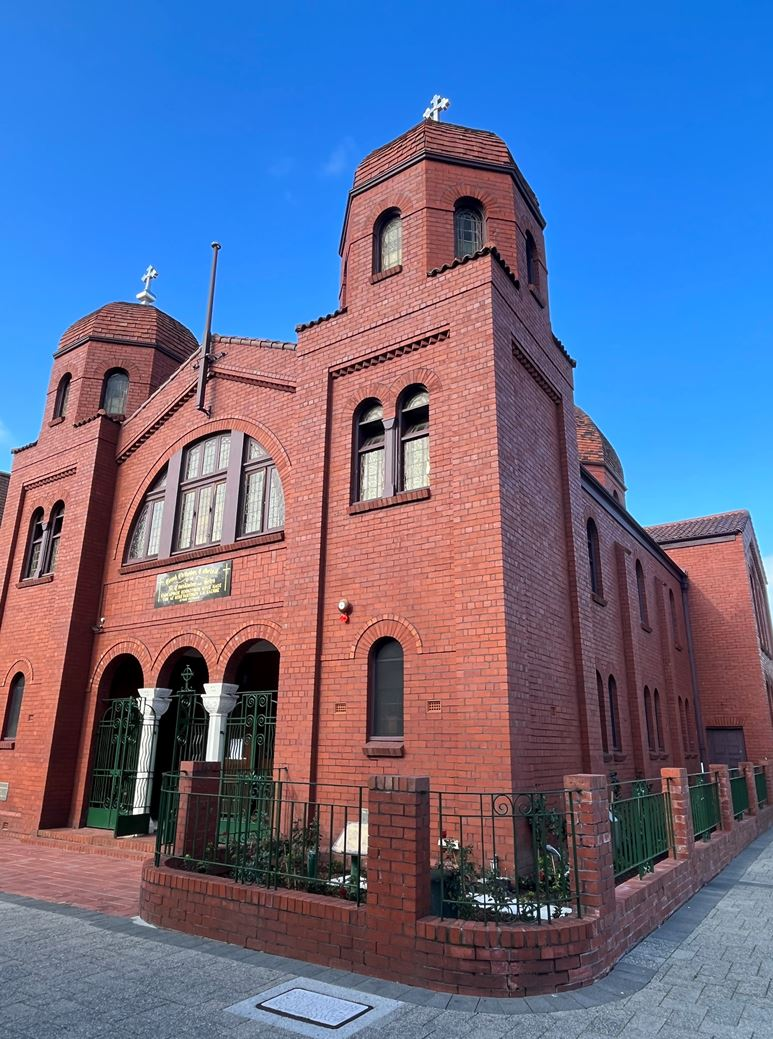
- Cathedral of Saints Constantine and Helene
- 31.9463°S 115.8564°E
- Location: Francis Street and Parker Street, Northbridge, Perth
- Country: Australia
- Language(s): Greek, English
- Denomination: Greek Orthodox

History
- Status: Cathedral
- Founder: Hellenic Community of WA
- Dedication: Saint Constantine, Saint Helene
- Dedicated: 24 July 1924
- Consecrated: 18 April 1937

Architecture
- Functional status: Active
- Architect(s): Oldham, Boas & Ednie-Brown, F. J. Deacon & Co
- Style: Byzantine Revival
- Years built: January–December 1936
- Groundbreaking: January 1936
- Completed: December 1936
- Construction cost: £4500

Administration
- Archdiocese: Greek Orthodox Archdiocese of Australia
- Diocese: Diocese of Perth

Clergy
- Archbishop: Archbishop Makarios Griniezakis
- Bishop: Bishop Elpidios of Perth
- Priest: Father Terry Gerovasilis

The Cathedral of Saints Constantine and Helene (Greek: Καθεδρικός Ναός Αγίων Κωνσταντίνου και Ελένης) is a Greek Orthodox church in Perth, Western Australia. It was the first Greek Orthodox church built in Western Australia and took twelve years to erect. Before its foundation, Greek migrants in Perth conducted ecclesiastical services in their homes and workplaces, as well as in Anglican venues. The Castellorizian Association of WA, made up of Greek migrants from the island of Castellorizo, bought land on Parker Street, Northbridge, to house a church and hall, and the Hellenic Community of Western Australia put effort into raising funds for the buildings. In 1925, the hall was built, where church services and fundraising events took place. In 1936, the church was built and a consecration ceremony was conducted the following year. The cathedral is based on Byzantine architecture and the Church of Saints Costandinou and Eleni in Castellorizo, and the build cost was £4500. Currently, Father Terry Gerovasilis is the church's parish priest.

== History ==
=== Early Greek community of Perth ===
The first Greek migrants came after 1900 and Australia only had one Greek Orthodox priest at the time, Father Dorotheus Bacaliaros, who resided in Melbourne. Father Serafim Phocas moved to Sydney and Father Athanasios Kantopoulos to Melbourne in 1905, both of whom would make regular visitations to the Greek community of Perth to conduct baptisms, weddings, christenings and liturgies for the next four years, until the Ecumenical Patriarchate of Constantinople sent Father Chrysanthos Constantinidis to Perth in 1911 to be its resident priest and conduct services for the 336 Greeks living in Perth at the time. In 1912, the Castellorizian Association of WA was formed by settlers from Castellorizo and the following year, Father Germanos Illiou arrived in Perth to conduct lessons for the Greek diaspora of Perth about the Greek language and religion. The Castellorizian Association of WA began working with the Anglican Church of Australia to allow for Greek services to be held in Murray Street's Hibernian Hall and Pier Street's Assembly Hall due to the lack of an Orthodox church in Perth. On 28 July 1922, during an influx of Greek migration to Australia due to World War I and the Greco-Turkish War, the Castellorizian Association purchased land on Parker Street, opposite Russell Square, to build a church and an adjacent hall. The Hellenic Community of Western Australia (HCWA) was formed the following year, whose "primary concern was the building of this longed-for Church". In its 1924 constitution, it stated, "The object of the Association is the erection of a Greek Orthodox Church, Greek school and the improvement of the religious, moral, mental and social conditions of its members."

=== Fundraising efforts ===
Many Greek women began hosting fundraising events for the building of the Church, which was estimated to exceed £4000. Some of the main fundraising events included afternoon teas, auctions, bazaars, concerts and raffles, hosted at Greek homes and city halls. The HCWA brought in Metropolitan Christopher Knetes on 24 July 1924 to bless the land on which the church would be built on and two foundation stones were laid, one of which was plaqued by Mrs J Michelides and Mrs T Kalafatas, who were "two well respected elders of the Greek Community in Perth", and another one to display thanks to the Castellorizian Association's effort in the Church build. The HCWA decided that the hall would be built first to allow a venue for ecclesiastical services and fundraising efforts and by 1925, it had been built next to the land where the Church would lie and was named the Hellenic Community Centre. For the next nine years, the Greek community aimed to pay-off their debt from erecting the hall and to find money to build the church. John Aris conducted many concerts in the hall, where poetry was recited, music was played and dances and theatrical shows were performed for the Perth inhabitants. When the Great Depression caused unemployment rates to rise in Australia, many Greeks abandoned the effort for a church to focus on their own financial priorities. Fundraising events continued when the depression ended and many Greeks promised to donate six pence of their wages to the Church cost every week.

=== Building and consecration ===
On 30 December 1935, the community had raised enough money to contact Oldham, Boas & Ednie-Brown, an architect company, who sketched the blueprints for the build. The church was inspired by Byzantine architecture and was based on the original Church of Saints Costandinou and Eleni in Castellorizo, which was described as a tribute to the original effort the Castellorizian Association of WA made. Once the blueprints had been contracted, the HCWA contacted F. J. Deacon & Co to erect the church and building commenced in January 1936. The final funds were found by Metropolitan Timotheos during his visit to Western Australia and the final cost was established as £4500. Many icons and pews which had been used in the hall were moved to the church and the electricity and lighting were completed by October 1936, when Castellorizian-born artist, Vlase Zanalis, and J Krafilakis were installed to paint the church's iconostasis. Painting finished in December, which marked the end of the building, and on 18 April 1937, a consecration ceremony was officiated by Metropolitan Timotheos, Archimandrite Illiou and Father Manessis, followed by a celebration in the hall.

=== Present day ===
The church was named a cathedral by Archbishop Ezekiel Tsoukalas in May 1972. In 2012, the cathedral celebrated its 75th anniversary. Father Theokloto was the cathedral's parish priest until he was succeeded by Father Elpidios, who later became Western Australia's bishop in 2020. Father Terry Gerovasilis and his family took charge of the cathedral later that year and Father Terry is currently serving as its parish priest. An Instagram and Facebook account for the cathedral were created in August 2020. A writer on the cathedral's Instagram page described the cathedral as "an integral feature of the lives of many Greek families. It is not only a place of salvation and worship, but it is a legacy and a testament to the hard work and sacrifices made by our ancestors who paved the way for us and gifted us with our very own spiritual home."
