= Roe Street, Perth =

Street in Perth, Western Australia

Roe Street, Perth Western Australia
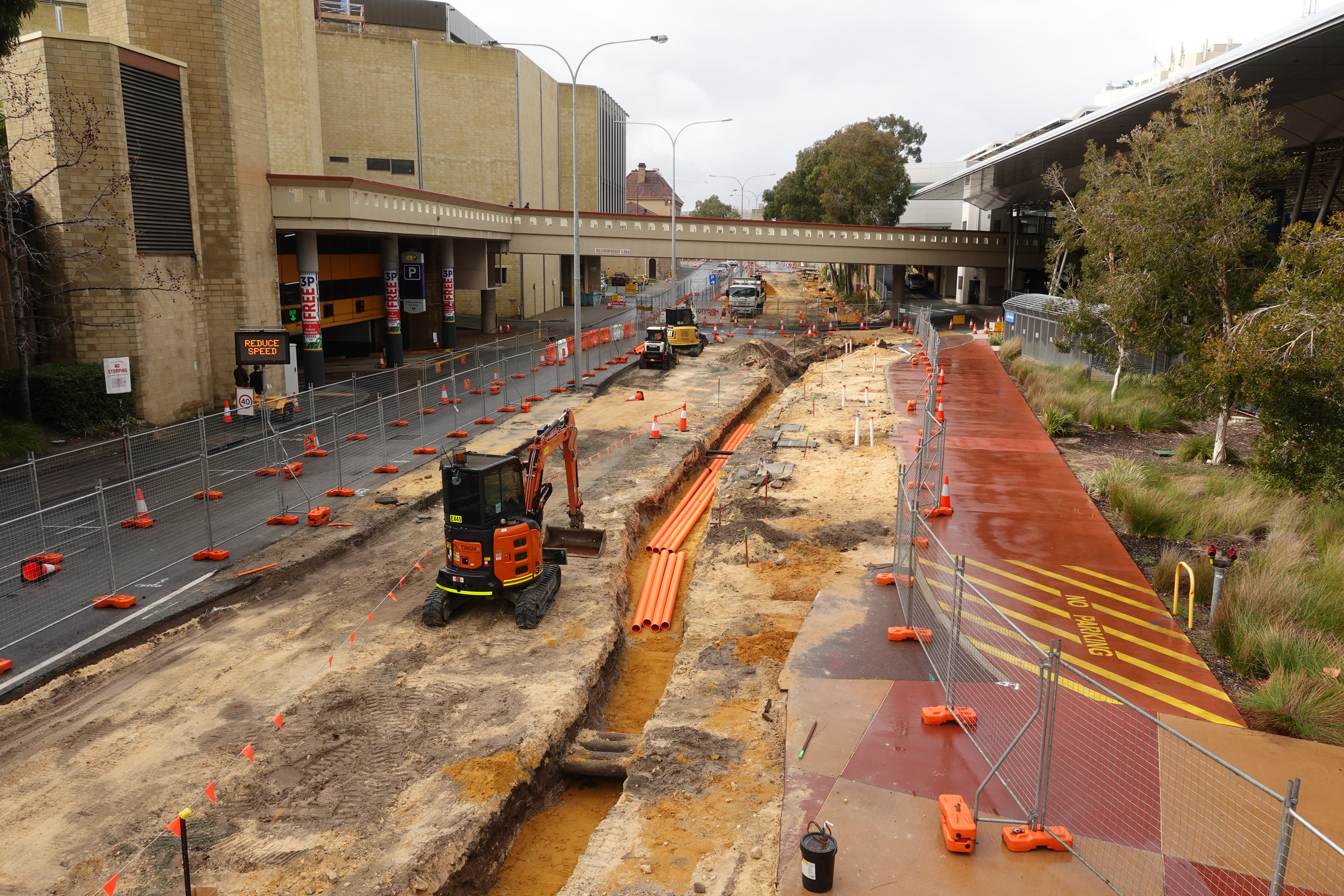

General information
- Type: Road
- Length: 1.6 km (1.0 mi)

Major junctions
- West end: Sutherland Street, West Perth; Railway Street, West Perth
- Mitchell Freeway (State Route 2); Fitzgerald Street; William Street (State Route 53); Beaufort Street (State Route 53)
- East end: Stirling Street, Perth

Location(s)
- LGA(s): City of Perth
- Major suburbs: Northbridge, Perth

Roe Street is a street in Perth, Western Australia. The central section of the street forms the southern boundary of the suburb of Northbridge, while the eastern end borders the Perth Cultural Centre to the north and Perth railway station to the south. The southern approach of the Hamilton Interchange, which connects the Mitchell Freeway and the Graham Farmer Freeway, passes over the street to the west.

Immediately south of Roe Street was the former site of the Perth Marshalling Yard; in the 2010s the Perth City Link project sank and covered the remaining parts of the railway south of Northbridge and opened up the area for redevelopment.

== History ==
Roe Street was named after John Septimus Roe, the Swan River Colony's first Surveyor-General.

It had a number of factories located on the street; examples include the Michelides Tobacco Factory and a factory for Peters Ice Cream. For a considerable length of time in the twentieth century it was also associated in the popular imagination in Western Australia as the location of brothels in Perth. Dubbed "Rue-de-Roe" by the press, fences were eventually erected along the rail line to shield the public from the view of the brothels on the street. Because of the changes in the regulation of prostitution in the state, the brothels have long since gone, and were replaced with other developments. A small section of the street serves as the southern boundary of Perth's Chinatown and features Asian-style street theming.

In the 2010s the Perth City Link project removed the vestiges of the railway yard and sunk and covered the Fremantle railway line, creating a large space for redevelopment of the area to the immediate south of the street. Between January 2014 and July 2016, the Roe Street bus station operated near Perth station to facilitate the construction of the Perth Busport at the former Wellington Street bus station site.

In December 2016, a new exit onto the street from the southbound direction of the Mitchell Freeway opened. The exit replaced a previous one on James Street, which was closed to enable the construction of the Charles Street Bus Bridge.

In June 2021, work began on revitalising a significant portion of the street to make it more pedestrian and bicycle friendly.

== Intersections ==
| LGA | Location | km | mi | Destinations | Notes |
|---|---|---|---|---|---|
| Perth | West Perth | 0 | 0.0 | Sutherland Street / Railway Street | Traffic light intersection; Roe Street continues west as Railway Street |
| Perth | West Perth–Northbridge–Perth tripoint | 0.35 | 0.22 | Mitchell Freeway (State Route 2) | Traffic light intersection; exit from freeway southbound to Roe Street only |
| Perth | Northbridge–Perth boundary | 0.45 | 0.28 | Fitzgerald Street (State Route 56) | Traffic light intersection |
| Perth | Northbridge–Perth boundary | 0.75 | 0.47 | Melbourne Street | Traffic light intersection |
| Perth | Northbridge–Perth boundary | 0.9 | 0.56 | Lake Street / King Street | Traffic light intersection |
| Perth | Northbridge–Perth boundary | 1.2 | 0.75 | William Street | Traffic light intersection |
| Perth | Perth | 1.5 | 0.93 | Beaufort Street (State Route 53) | Traffic light intersection; no turning from Beaufort Street to Roe Street eastbound |
| Perth | Perth | 1.6 | 0.99 | Stirling Street | Roe Street continues north as Stirling Street |
1.000 mi = 1.609 km; 1.000 km = 0.621 mi: Incomplete access
