= McIver railway station =

Railway station in Perth, Western Australia

McIver
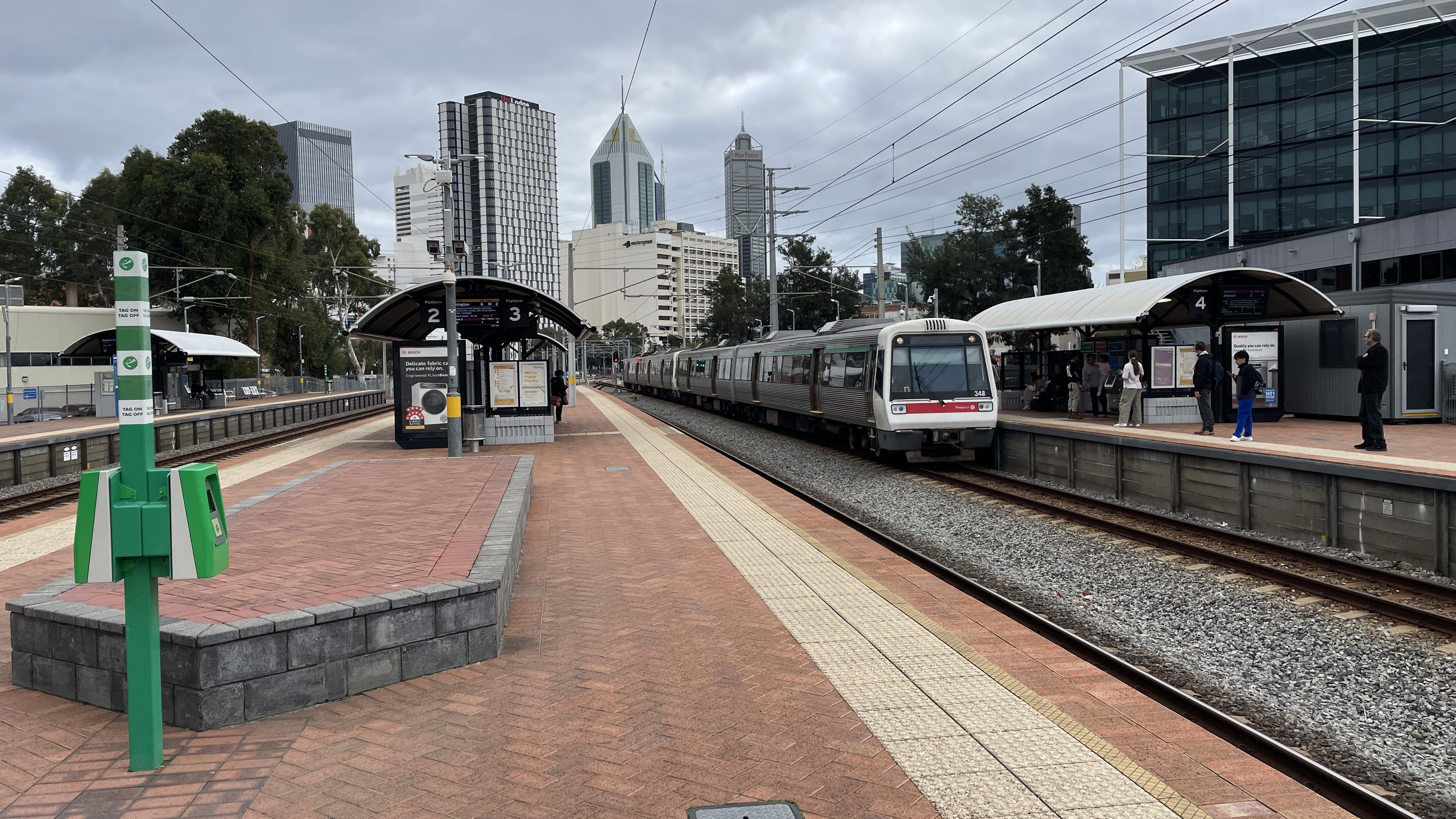
- Transperth A-series train on platform 4

General information
- Location: Moore Street, Nash Street; Perth; Western Australia; Australia
- Coordinates: 31°57′06″S 115°52′00″E
- Owner: Public Transport Authority
- Operator: Transperth
- Lines: Airport line; Armadale line; Ellenbrook line; Midland line; Thornlie–Cockburn line
- Distance: 0.9 km (0.6 mi) from Perth
- Platforms: 4 (2 side, 1 island)
- Tracks: 4
- Bus routes: 6
- Connections: Bus transfer at Wellington Street

Construction
- Structure type: Ground
- Parking: No
- Cycle facilities: Yes
- Accessible: Yes

Other information
- Status: Staffed
- Station code: MMR
- Fare zone: 1 /

History
- Opened: 1 September 1989

Passengers
- 2013–2014: 564,672

Services
Preceding station	Transperth	Following station
Perth Terminus	Armadale line	Claisebrook towards Byford
Perth Terminus	Thornlie–Cockburn line	Claisebrook towards Cockburn Central
Perth Terminus	Midland line	Claisebrook towards Midland
Perth Terminus	Ellenbrook line	Claisebrook towards Ellenbrook
Perth towards Claremont	Airport line	Claisebrook towards High Wycombe
Location
- Location of McIver railway station

McIver railway station is a railway station on the Transperth network in Perth, Western Australia. It is located on the Airport, Armadale, Midland, Thornlie–Cockburn, and Ellenbrook lines, 0.9 kilometres (0.56 mi) from Perth station, providing access to Royal Perth Hospital.

== History ==
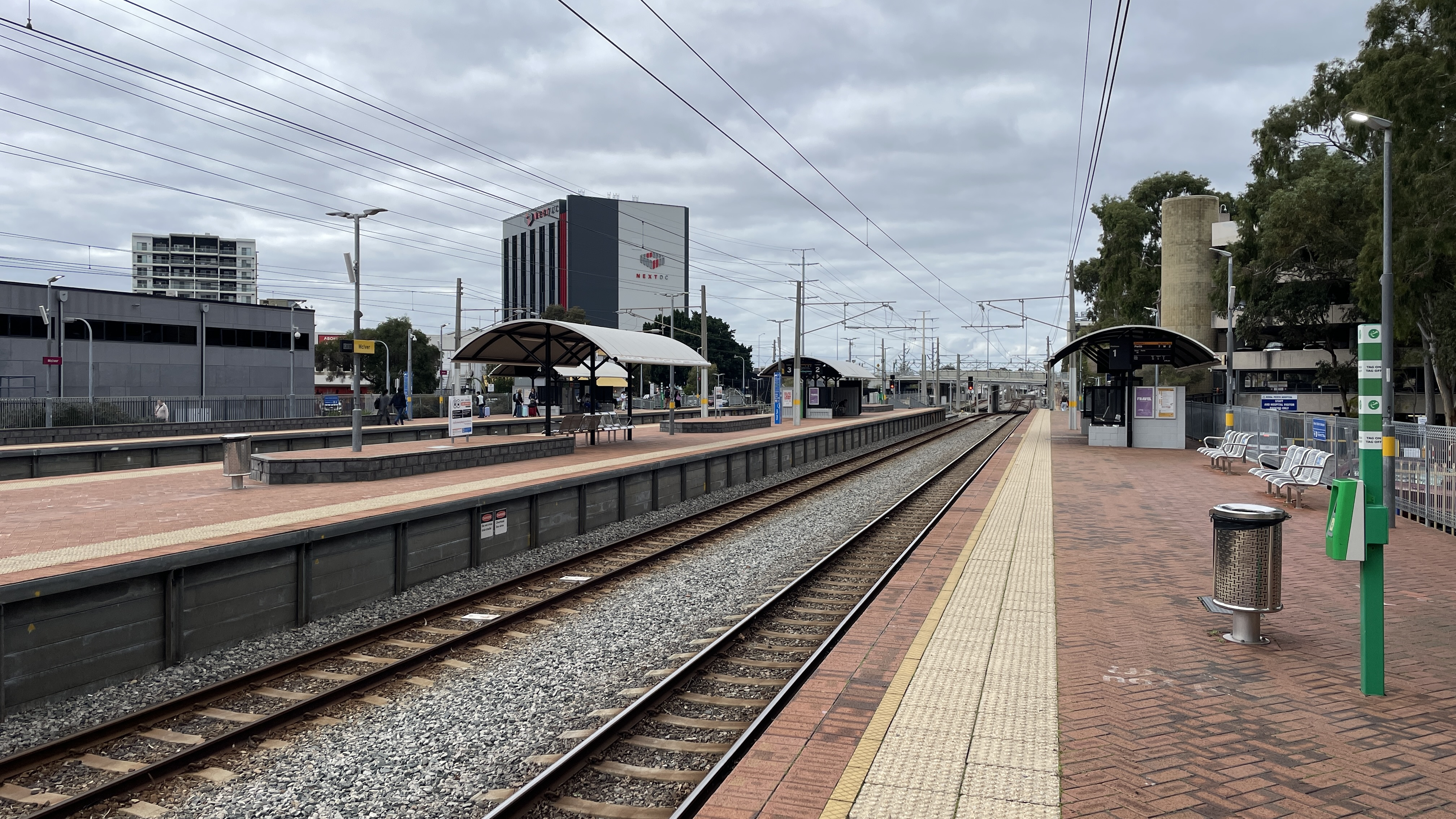
Looking east

The station was opened on 1 September 1989 and named after Ken McIver, a long serving steam engine driver and Labor member of the Western Australian Legislative Assembly for Northam and Avon from 1968 until 1986. The station was purpose-built to provide access directly to Royal Perth Hospital.

It has received Airport line services since 9 October 2022, Ellenbrook line services since 8 December 2024 and Thornlie-Cockburn line services since 8 June 2025.

The station has a pedestrian underpass on the eastern end of the platforms. A pedestrian level crossing at the western end of the station was closed in 2026 due to safety concerns.

== Platforms ==
McIver station is one of the two stations that service the Airport, Armadale, Ellenbrook, Midland and Thornlie lines, with the other station being Claisebrook. The station saw 564,672 passengers in the 2013–2014 financial year.

The following platforms are currently in use at McIver:

McIver platform arrangement
Stop ID	Platform	Line	Destination	Via	Stopping Pattern	Notes	Source
99011	1	Armadale line	Perth		All stations		
99011	1	Thornlie-Cockburn line	Perth		All stations		
99012	2	Armadale line	Byford		All stations		
99012	2	Thornlie-Cockburn line	Cockburn Central		All stations		
99013	3	Airport line	Claremont	Perth	All stations, P	P pattern terminates at Perth.	
99013	3	Ellenbrook line	Perth		All stations		
99013	3	Midland line	Perth		All stations		
99014	4	Airport line	High Wycombe		All stations		
99014	4	Ellenbrook line	Ellenbrook		All stations		
99014	4	Midland line	Midland		All stations		

== Bus routes ==
Stop	Route	Destination / description	Notes
Wellington Street Eastbound Yellow CAT	3 Yellow CAT	to East Perth via Wellington Street	
38	to Cloverdale		
51	to Cannington Station		
220	to Armadale Station via Albany Highway		
960	to Curtin University Bus Station	High frequency	
901	Rail replacement service to Midland		
902	Rail replacement service to High Wycombe		
903	Rail replacement service to Ellenbrook		
908	Rail replacement service to Cockburn Central via Thornlie		
Wellington Street Westbound Yellow CAT	3 Yellow CAT	to West Perth via Wellington Street	
38, 51, 220	Perth Busport		
960	Mirrabooka Bus Station via Perth Busport	High frequency, selected trips terminate at ECU Mount Lawley	
901, 902, 903, 908	Rail replacement service to Perth		
