= Claisebrook railway station =

Railway station in Perth, Western Australia

Claisebrook
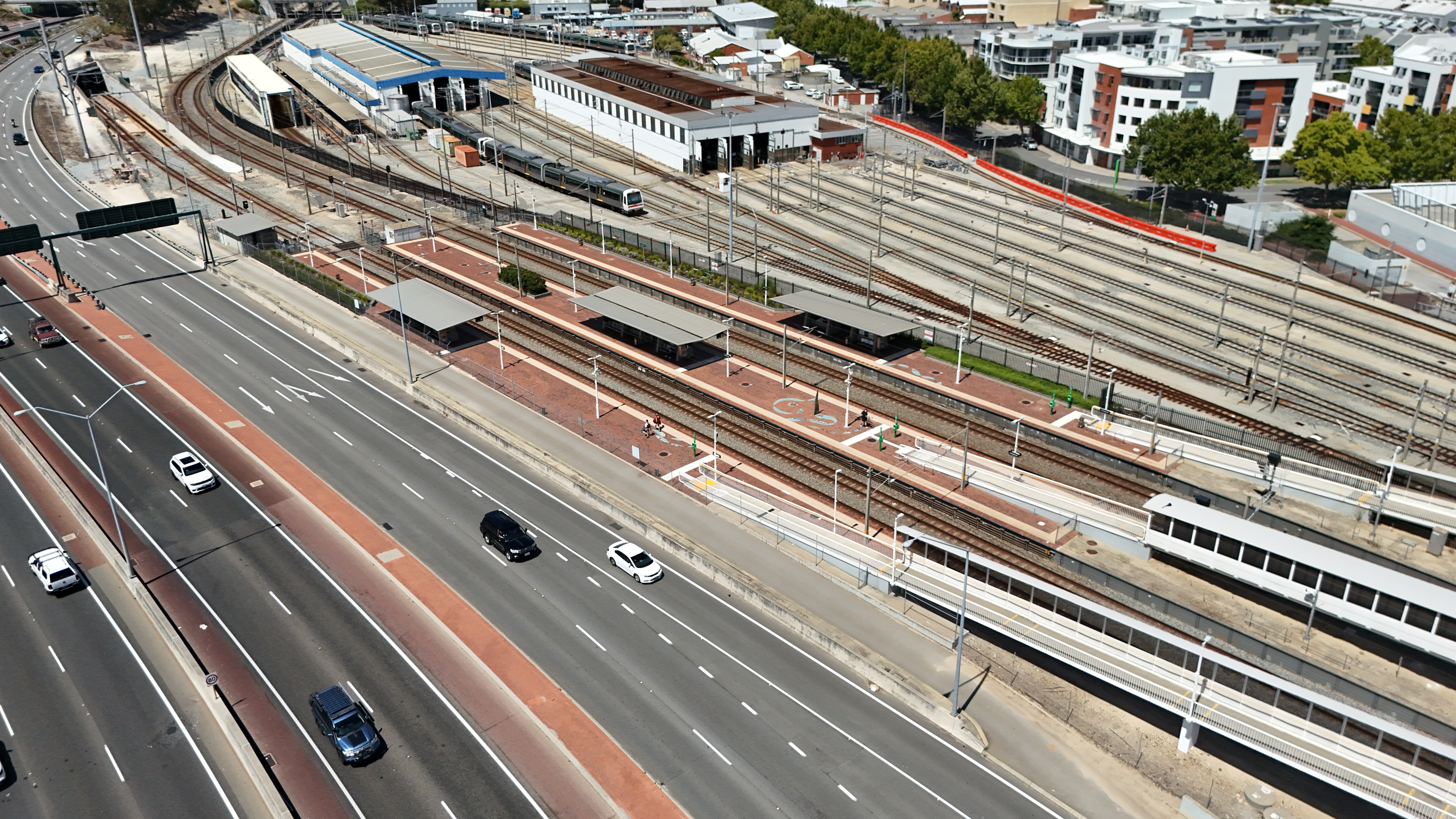
- Claisebrook Station as of February 2026

General information
- Location: Graham Farmer Freeway, Edward Street, Fielder Street; East Perth; Western Australia; Australia
- Coordinates: 31°56′58″S 115°52′21″E
- Owner: Public Transport Authority
- Operator: Transperth
- Lines: Airport line; Armadale line; Ellenbrook line; Midland line; Thornlie–Cockburn line
- Distance: 1.3 km (0.8 mi) from Perth
- Platforms: 4 (1 island, 2 side)
- Tracks: 4
- Bus routes: 1
- Connections: Yellow CAT

Construction
- Structure type: Ground
- Parking: No
- Cycle facilities: No
- Accessible: Yes

Other information
- Status: Unstaffed
- Station code: MCK
- Fare zone: 1 /

History
- Opened: 1883
- Former names: East Perth

Passengers
- 2013-14: 535,085

Services
Preceding station	Transperth	Following station
McIver towards Perth	Armadale line	Perth Stadium towards Byford
McIver towards Perth	Thornlie–Cockburn line	Perth Stadium towards Cockburn Central
McIver towards Perth	Midland line	East Perth towards Midland
McIver towards Perth	Ellenbrook line	East Perth towards Ellenbrook
McIver towards Claremont	Airport line	East Perth towards High Wycombe
Location
- Location of Claisebrook railway station

Claisebrook railway station is a railway station on the Transperth network. It is located on the Airport, Armadale, Ellenbrook, Midland, and Thornlie–Cockburn lines 1.3 kilometres (0.81 mi) from Perth station serving the suburb of East Perth.

== History ==
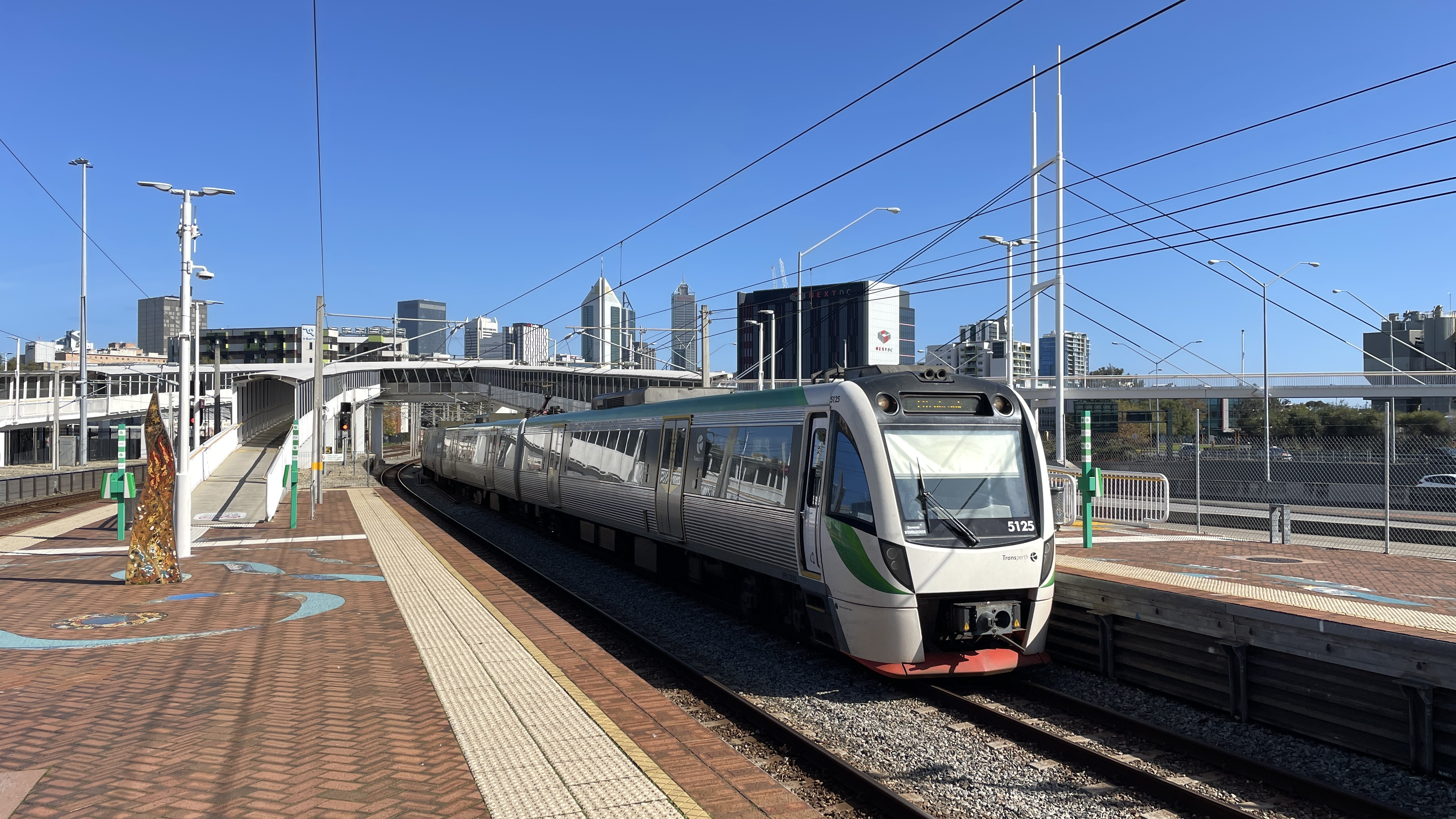
Transperth B-series train departs Platform 2

Opened in 1883 under the name East Perth, Claisebrook station is a busy junction along the Airport, Midland, Armadale and Thornlie–Cockburn lines due to both lines running through the station and the Claisebrook railway depot being next door.

The original railway station was built in timber with hardwood weatherboarding and external and timber lining. Rendered brick fireplaces were built in two of the rooms – possibly the waiting rooms and railway staff room and had very elegant rendered chimney caps providing a balance to the roof.

The Battye library carries the original plans and shows exposed heavy timber trussing of the roof which was very typical of the architecture of railway buildings of the era. The roofing was corrugated iron curved to provide a concave upper surface with the roof overhanging the tracks and providing cover to passengers leaving and arriving at the station. As railway rolling stock grew taller the wide eaves and the timber trussing of the roof were trimmed back giving the roof a truncated appearance.

The station was located centrally between the east and west bound tracks and provided access to both. In 1984 the station was relocated to Whiteman Park as Central Station on the Bennett Brook Railway, where it is now known as Whiteman Village Junction.

In 1969, a new railway terminal was built 600 metres (2,000 ft) away on the Midland line called East Perth, and caused this station to be renamed Claisebrook after the watercourse that is near the station. Between 2002 and 2003 the station was mostly rebuilt with new station structures, signage, platform finishes and a footbridge.

It has received Airport line services since 9 October 2022 as well as Ellenbrook line services since 8 December 2024.

In 2024, Claisebrook station was identified as one of three stations to have its platform extended to 150 metres (490 ft) as part of phase one of the platform and signalling upgrade program to allow for six-car trains on the Ellenbrook line and Thornlie–Cockburn line.

== Platforms ==
The station saw 535,085 passengers in the 2013–14 financial year.

The following platforms are currently in use at Claisebrook:

Claisebrook platform arrangement
Stop ID	Platform	Line	Destination	Via	Stopping Pattern	Notes
99021	1	Armadale line	Perth		All stations	
99021	1	Thornlie-Cockburn line	Perth		All stations	During events at Perth Stadium, services do not stop at this station.
99022	2	Armadale line	Byford		All stations	
99022	2	Thornlie-Cockburn line	Cockburn Central		All stations	During events at Perth Stadium, services do not stop at this station.
99023	3	Airport line	Claremont	Perth	All stations	
99023	3	Airport line	Perth		P	Operates during late nights when services do not continue to Claremont.
99023	3	Ellenbrook line	Perth		All stations	
99023	3	Midland line	Perth		All stations	
99024	4	Airport line	High Wycombe		All stations	
99024	4	Ellenbrook line	Ellenbrook		All stations	
99024	4	Midland line	Midland		All stations	

== Bus connections ==
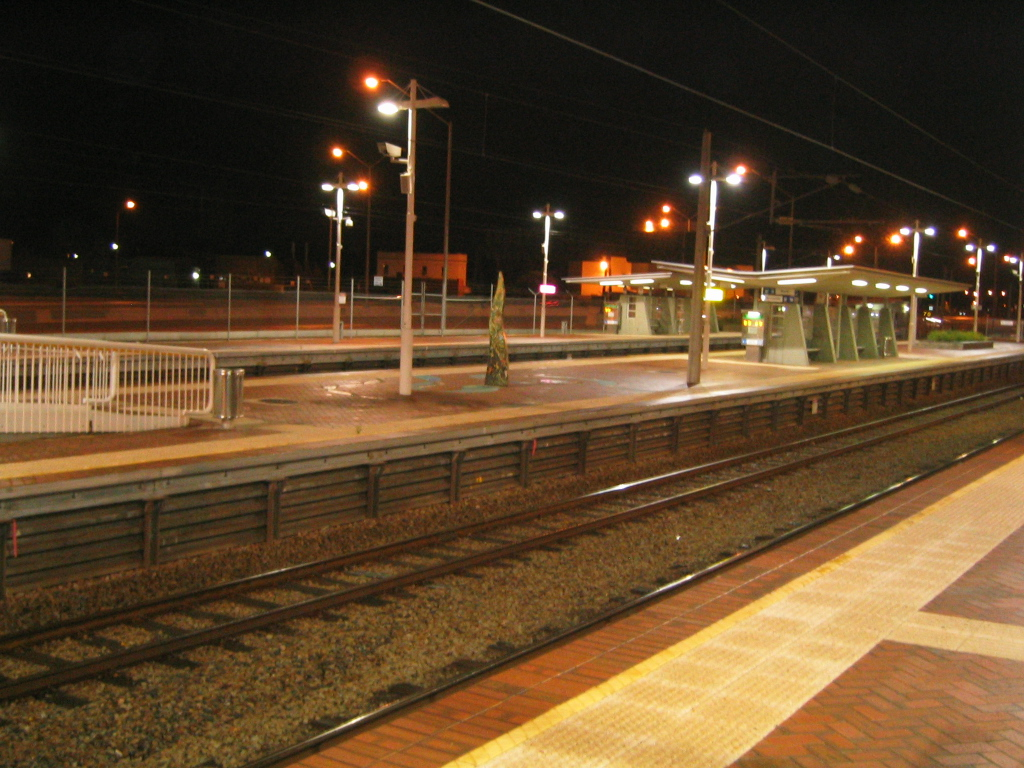
Claisebrook Station at night

Connections are available by Yellow CAT, which serves throughout East Perth, West Perth, and the City's centre corridor.

Stop	Route	Destination / description	Notes
Claisebrook station Yellow CAT	3 Yellow CAT	to West Perth via Wellington Street	
Fielder Street Northbound	901	Rail replacement service to Midland	
Fielder Street Northbound	902	Rail replacement service to High Wycombe	
Fielder Street Northbound	903	Rail replacement service to Ellenbrook	
Fielder Street Northbound	908	Rail replacement service to Cockburn Central via Thornlie	
Fielder Street Southbound	901, 902, 903, 908	Rail replacement service to Perth	
