= Wellington Street, Perth =

Road in Perth, Western Australia

Wellington Street, Perth Western Australia
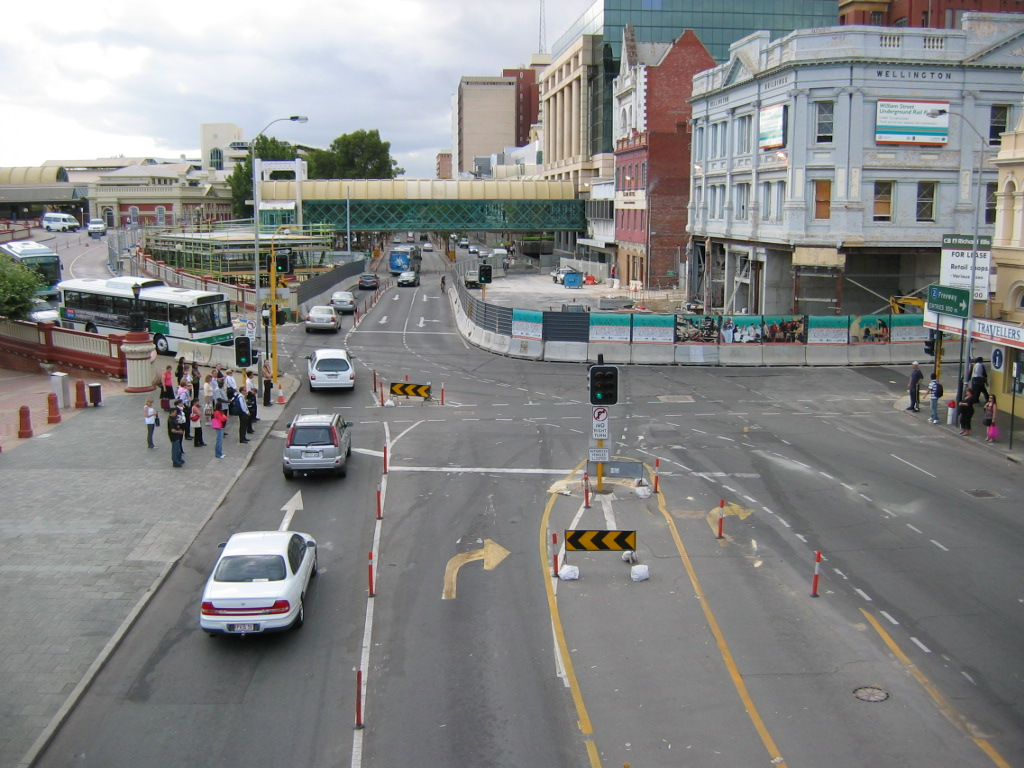
- Wellington Street construction work outside the Perth railway station, c. 2007

General information
- Type: Road
- Length: 3.7 km (2.3 mi)
- Route number(s): State Route 65

Major junctions
- East end: Plain Street (State Route 65 / State Route 66), East Perth
- Lord Street (State Route 51); Beaufort Street (State Route 53); William Street (State Route 53); Mitchell Freeway (State Route 2)
- West end: Thomas Street (State Route 61 / State Route 65), West Perth

Location(s)
- Major suburbs: East Perth, Perth, West Perth

Wellington Street is the northernmost of the four primary east-west streets in the central business district of Perth, Western Australia. It is 3.7 kilometres (2.3 mi) long, stretching from Plain Street in East Perth to Thomas Street in West Perth.

== Route description ==
Wellington Street begins at Plain Street in East Perth, as the continuation of Waterloo Crescent. It travels in an east-north-easterly direction, passing the Wellington Square park. In the suburb of Perth, Wellington Street is adjacent to a number of notable buildings and landmarks, including Royal Perth Hospital, Forrest Chase shopping centre, Perth railway station, Yagan Square, Perth Busport, and Perth Arena, before reaching the Mitchell Freeway. The road passes under the freeway with a half-diamond interchange that has a southbound freeway exit ramp and a northbound entrance ramp. Wellington Street continues into West Perth, past the Watertown shopping centre and other commercial properties, until it ends at an intersection with Thomas Street and Roberts Road, near Perth Modern School.

Parts of the street near the railway station are home to several budget hotels and backpacker lodgings, while the more upmarket Hotel Grand Chancellor is located closer to the freeway.

Wellington Street is part of State Route 65, which continues south from the street's eastern end to Riverside Drive, near The Causeway, and from the western end of the street to West Coast Highway south of City Beach.

== History ==
Wellington Street was named after the Duke of Wellington. It existed as far back as 1838, although at that time it only extended as far east as Milligan Street. In 1894, the section of road continuing north-west of Milligan Street was known as Douro Street, although the name Douro Street for this section of road appears on maps as early as 1855. It is unclear, however, as to when this road extension was actually made, as maps from 1860 still show Lake Irwin with Douro Street and surrounding lots superimposed over it, suggesting the lake was yet to be drained and Douro Street was yet to be constructed.

A significant presence on the block between Wellington and Murray Streets was the Boans department store until 1986 when the building was demolished and replaced by the Forrest Chase shopping centre and the Myer department store. Former main offices along the street include Wesfarmers. Other former landmarks along Wellington Street include the now demolished Wellington Street bus station and Perth Entertainment Centre. The western and eastern ends of the street were locations of the city-based industries that survived until the 1950s when industry moved out into new industrial locations in the suburbs.

A considerable number of historical photographs are available of the street during its history.

=== Eastern end ===
The eastern end of Wellington Street has historically been and is currently the location of several government departments and facilities. Main Roads Western Australia is located in the Don Aitken Centre, at the north-east corner of the intersection at the eastern end of the street, and Royal Perth Hospital has buildings on both sides of the street, to the west of Lord Street.

=== Western end ===
Considerable change from industrial and residential purposes at the western end has occurred with office buildings being the dominant mode of building.

=== Transport facilities ===
The area of the street facing the Perth railway station to the north, Forrest Place to the south, and bound by Barrack Street to the east, and William Street to the west, was effectively the transport hub of Perth from the 1880s when the first railway station was built, until the 1960s when public transport and private car usage changed significantly in Perth.

Tram services developed along the street early.

The main transport facilities on the street have included the Wellington Street bus station and the Perth railway station. In 1933 the first permanent trolleybus system in Australia ran along Wellington Street. The underground Perth Busport, which opened in 2016 to replace the Wellington Street bus station, is located partially underneath the street, with a ramp for bus access originating at the intersection between Wellington and William Streets.

== Intersections ==
All intersections below are controlled by traffic lights.

| LGA | Location | km | mi | Destinations | Notes |
|---|---|---|---|---|---|
| Perth–Subiaco boundary | West Perth–Subiaco boundary | 0.0 | 0.0 | Thomas Street (State Route 61) northbound – Crawley, Nedlands, Leederville, Yokine | Western terminus. Continues as Roberts Road (State Route 65) one-way from the west with no movements permitted from either Thomas or Wellington Streets. |
| Perth | West Perth | 0.4 | 0.25 | Colin Street – Kings Park | Access to City West railway station. |
| Perth | West Perth | 0.6 | 0.37 | Havelock Street – Kings Park | No right permitted from Wellington Street eastbound to Havelock Street south |
| Perth | West Perth | 0.7 | 0.43 | Sutherland Street – Northbridge, Stirling, Joondalup, Yanchep | Access to Mitchell Freeway northbound |
| Perth | West Perth–Perth boundary | 1.0 | 0.62 | Mitchell Freeway (State Route 2) northbound entry ramp / George Street southbound – Stirling, Joondalup, Yanchep | No access to George Street due to being one-way northbound |
| Perth | West Perth–Perth boundary | 1.1 | 0.68 | Mitchell Freeway (State Route 2) southbound exit ramp / Elder Street southbound – Fremantle, Rockingham, Mandurah | No access to Mitchell Freeway due to being one-way southbound. Elder Street connects to Kwinana Freeway |
| Perth | Perth | 1.3 | 0.81 | Milligan Street | Access to Perth Arena |
| Perth | Perth | 1.6 | 0.99 | King Street – Northbridge | No through traffic permitted. King Street northbound must turn left. |
| Perth | Perth | 1.9 | 1.2 | William Street – Fremantle, Northbridge, Mount Lawley | No right turns permitted except for William Street southbound to Wellington Street westbound. No left turn permitted for William Street southbound to Wellington Street eastbound. |
| Perth | Perth | 2.2 | 1.4 | Beaufort Street northbound / Barrack Street southbound (State Route 53) – Highgate, Mount Lawley, Inglewood, Bedford | No right turn permitted for Wellington Street eastbound to Barrack Street southbound. |
| Perth | Perth | 2.4 | 1.5 | Pier Street | |
| Perth | East Perth–Perth boundary | 2.8 | 1.7 | Lord Street (State Route 51 north) – Mount Lawley, Welshpool, Guildford, Perth Airport | Lord Street one-way northbound. Access to Graham Farmer Freeway. |
| Perth | East Perth–Perth boundary | 3.0 | 1.9 | Hill Street (State Route 51 south) | Hill Street is one-way southbound |
| Perth | East Perth | 3.3 | 2.1 | Bennett Street | |
| Perth | East Perth | 3.7 | 2.3 | Plain Street (State Route 65) – Mount Lawley, Maylands | Eastern terminus, continues as Waterloo Crescent. State Route 65 concurrency terminus |
1.000 mi = 1.609 km; 1.000 km = 0.621 mi: Incomplete access
