= James Street, Northbridge =

Road in Perth, Western Australia

Coordinates: 31.948°S 115.857°E

James Street Western Australia

General information
- Type: Road
- Length: 1.4 km (0.9 mi)

Major junctions
- West end: Graham Farmer Freeway (State Route 8)
- Fitzgerald Street; William Street (State Route 53); Beaufort Street (State Route 53)
- East end: Pier Street

Location(s)
- LGA(s): City of Perth
- Major suburbs: Northbridge, Perth

James Street is a street which serves the Perth suburbs Perth and Northbridge. It is the main east-west road in the centre of Northbridge.

A section of the eastern end of the street has been closed and modified as the James Street Mall in the Perth Cultural Centre – with the Western Australian Museum, Alexander Library Building and older government buildings contained within the culture centre area.

The central section between William Street and to the western end at Russell Square is a streetscape with a colourful and extensive history of crime, and notoriety. The street remains a popular location for its entertainment and nightlife, with numerous bars, nightclubs, and live music venues operating.

Until December 2016, the Mitchell Freeway had a southbound exit onto the street. The exit was removed and replaced with one at Roe Street to enable the construction of the Charles Street Bus Bridge.

== Intersections ==
LGA	Location	km	mi	Destinations	Notes
Perth	Northbridge	0	0.0	Graham Farmer Freeway (State Route 8)	Exit from freeway westbound only; traffic lights shared with James Street Bus Bridge and Northbridge Bus Depot
Perth	Northbridge	0.02	0.012	James Street Bus Bridge	Traffic lights shared with Graham Farmer Freeway exit and Northbridge Bus Depot; bridge access includes one-way turnaround of westbound James Street traffic before bus-only entry
Perth	Northbridge	0.14	0.087	Fitzgerald Street	Traffic light intersection
Perth	Northbridge	0.35	0.22	Shenton Street	
Perth	Northbridge	0.4	0.25	Melbourne Street	Give way sign controlled, giving James Street priority
Perth	Northbridge	0.45	0.28	Parker Street	Stop sign controlled, giving James Street priority
Perth	Northbridge	0.5	0.31	Mountain Terrace	Mountain Terrace is one-way northbound
Perth	Northbridge	0.6	0.37	Lake Street	Roundabout
Perth	Northbridge-Perth boundary	1.2	0.75	William Street (State Route 53)	Traffic light intersection; stub of James Street extends east beyond intersection before beginning of James Street Mall
James Street Mall
Perth	Perth	1.2	0.75	Beaufort Street (State Route 53)	No right turn from James Street to Beaufort Street northbound
Perth	Perth	1.3	0.81	Stirling Street	Stop sign controlled, giving Stirling Street priority
Perth	Perth	1.4	0.87	Pier Street	Give way sign controlled: Pier Street northbound gives way
1.000 mi = 1.609 km; 1.000 km = 0.621 mi: Incomplete access
