= Russell Square, Perth =

Park in Northbridge, Western Australia

Coordinates: 31.9461°S 115.8555°E

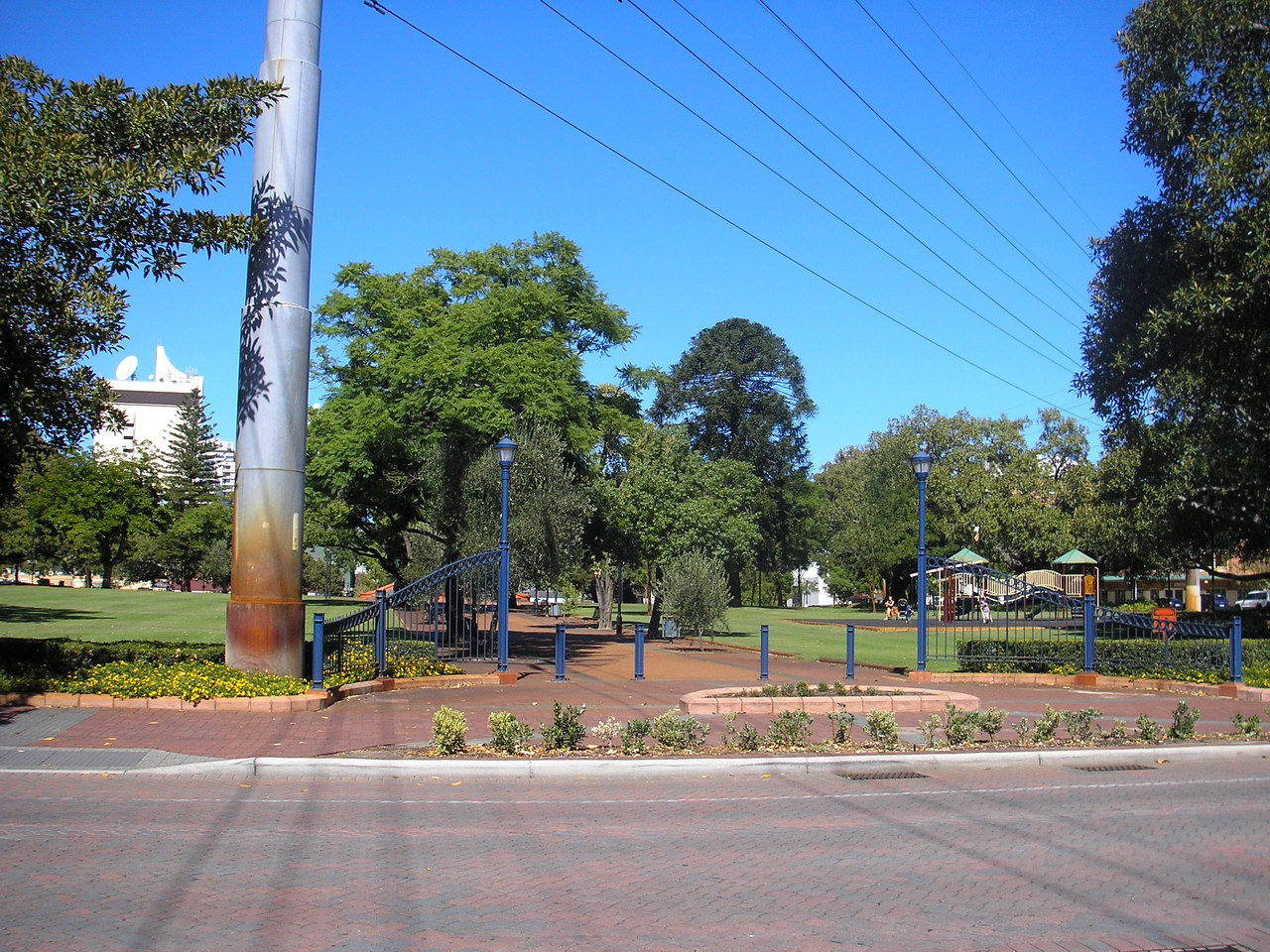
Russell Square

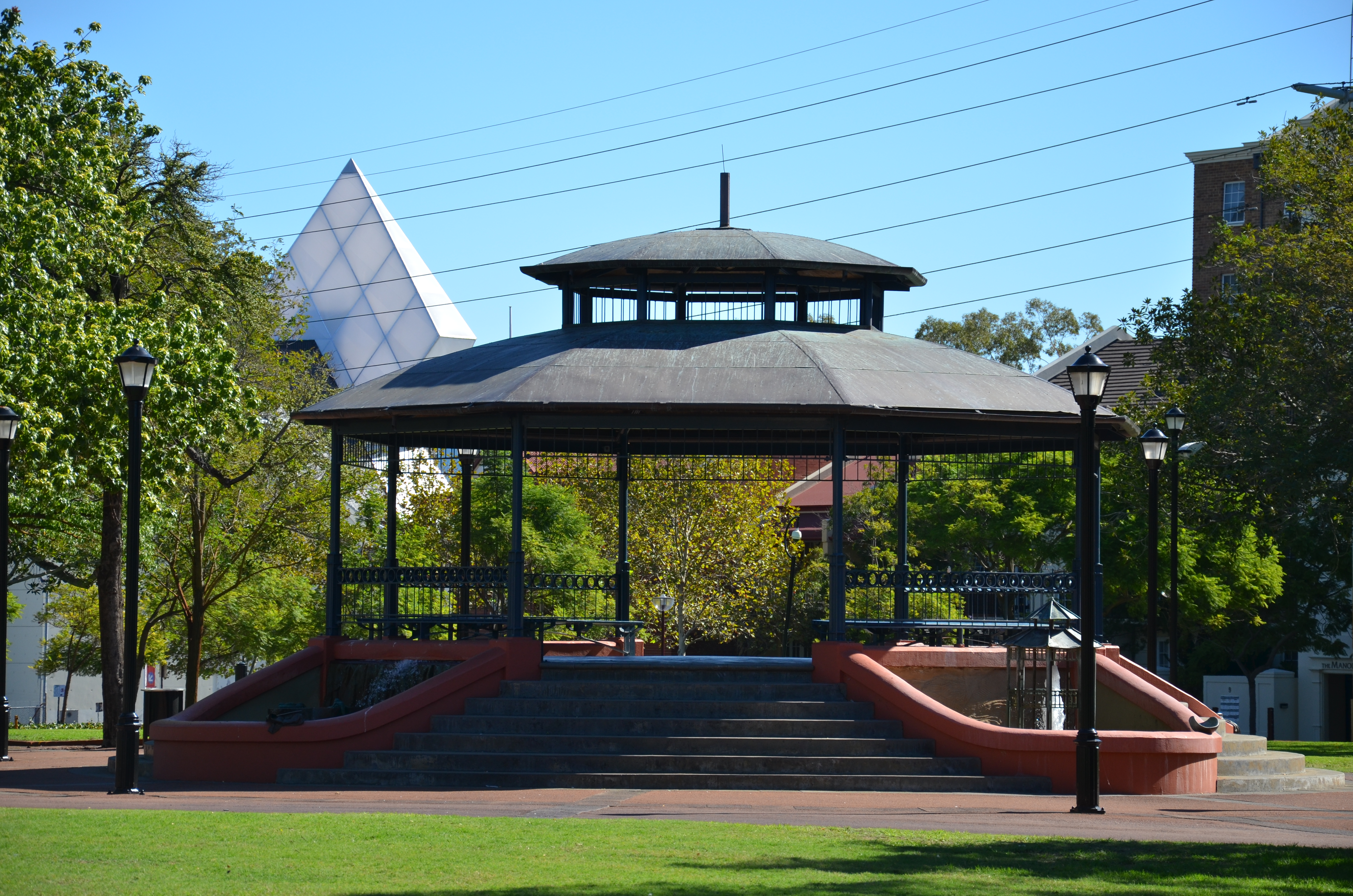
Bandstand at the centre of Russell Square

Russell Square in Perth, Western Australia is a large public space between Aberdeen Street and James Street in Northbridge. It was named after Lord John Russell.

The eastern boundary is on Parker Street, which is the location of the Cathedral of Saints Constantine and Helene, and the Hellenic Community Centre. Shenton Street is the western boundary of the square.

Russell Square was created some time between 1838 and 1845; it appears on 1845 maps of Perth, but not on 1838 maps.

Prior to the first world war photographs taken from the eastern side give a sense of the development of the square.

In the 1920s it was the location of brass band music supported by the Perth City Council.

It has also been known as the park of sighs (Italian: Parco dei Sospiri) as it was the favoured meeting place of the Italian community of Little Italy.

In the early 1990s it was reviewed in planning studies. In October 1994 Russell Square was upgraded, and thirty sculptures were designed and created by local artists Greg James and Drago Dadich.

It has been a venue for the Festival of Perth.
