= Northbridge, Western Australia =

Northbridge
- Suburb
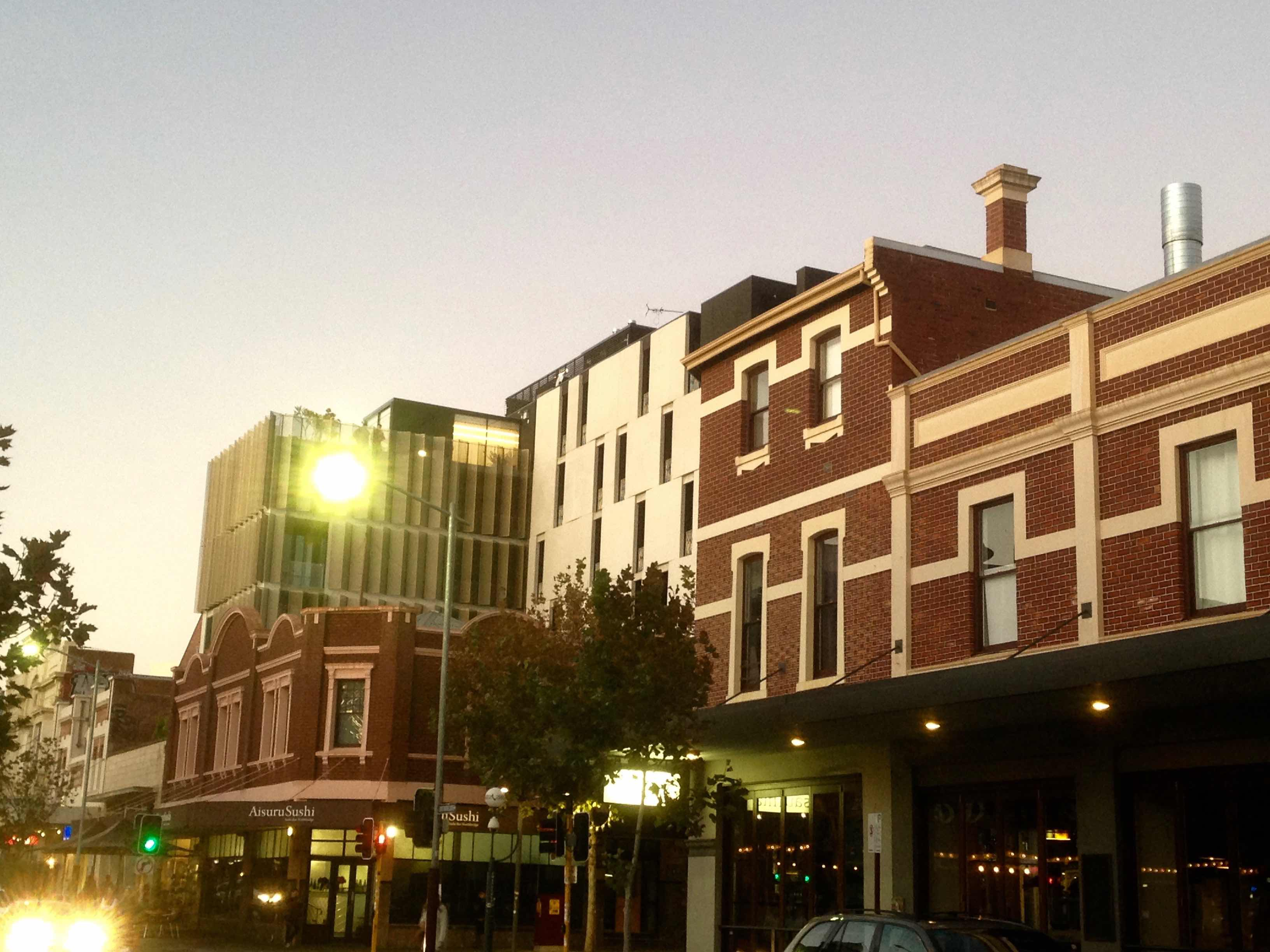
- William Street, Northbridge
- Interactive map of Northbridge
- Coordinates: 31.946°S 115.854°E
- Country: Australia
- State: Western Australia
- City: Perth
- LGA: City of Perth
- Location: 1 km (0.62 mi) N of the Perth CBD

Government
  - State electorate: Perth
  - Federal division: Perth

Area
  - Total: 0.5 km^{2} (0.19 sq mi)

Population
  - Total: 1,420 (SAL 2021)
- Postcode: 6003
Suburbs around Northbridge
West Perth	North Perth	Highgate
West Perth	Northbridge	East Perth
West Perth	Perth CBD	Perth CBD

Northbridge is an inner city suburb of Perth, Western Australia, historically separated from Perth's central business district by the Fremantle and Joondalup railway lines. It is part of the City of Perth local government area.

== Location ==
Located immediately north of the CBD, Northbridge is officially bounded by William Street, Roe Street, Newcastle Street and the Mitchell Freeway.

The name Northbridge is often misapplied to areas and landmarks east of William Street and/or north of Newcastle Street, such as the Perth Cultural Centre, which are technically still part of the suburb of Perth.

The area is accessible by foot from Perth railway station and Perth Busport. It is served by a free Central Area Transit bus and also has a significant number of public car parks, both open and high rise.

The area is largely a mix of commercial, public and residential properties.

== History ==
The area now known as Northbridge originally hosted freshwater swamps where the current railway station and railway lines are.

Draining of the swamps commenced in the 1860s, by convict labour, facilitating the construction of more permanent buildings. The gold boom of the 1890s saw the construction of many hotels for the accommodation of prospectors, including The Great Western Hotel (built 1896, now the Brass Monkey Hotel). The 1890s saw the area home to the state attorney-general and many other wealthy or influential people.

Several private schools were also established in the late colonial area, such as Scotch College (1897) and Presbyterian Ladies' College (1915). These schools have since relocated. Around the time of World War I, the area became a hub of European immigration, especially Greek and Macedonian.

In the 1950s and 60s post-war European migration changed the culture of the city, creating an al-fresco lifestyle of restaurants, cafes and bars that people enjoy today.

The area was once a part of the Perth central business district, and was known by informal names such as "North of the Bridge" and "North of the [railway] Line". It was split from Perth and officially gazetted as a suburb in 1982.

== Culture ==
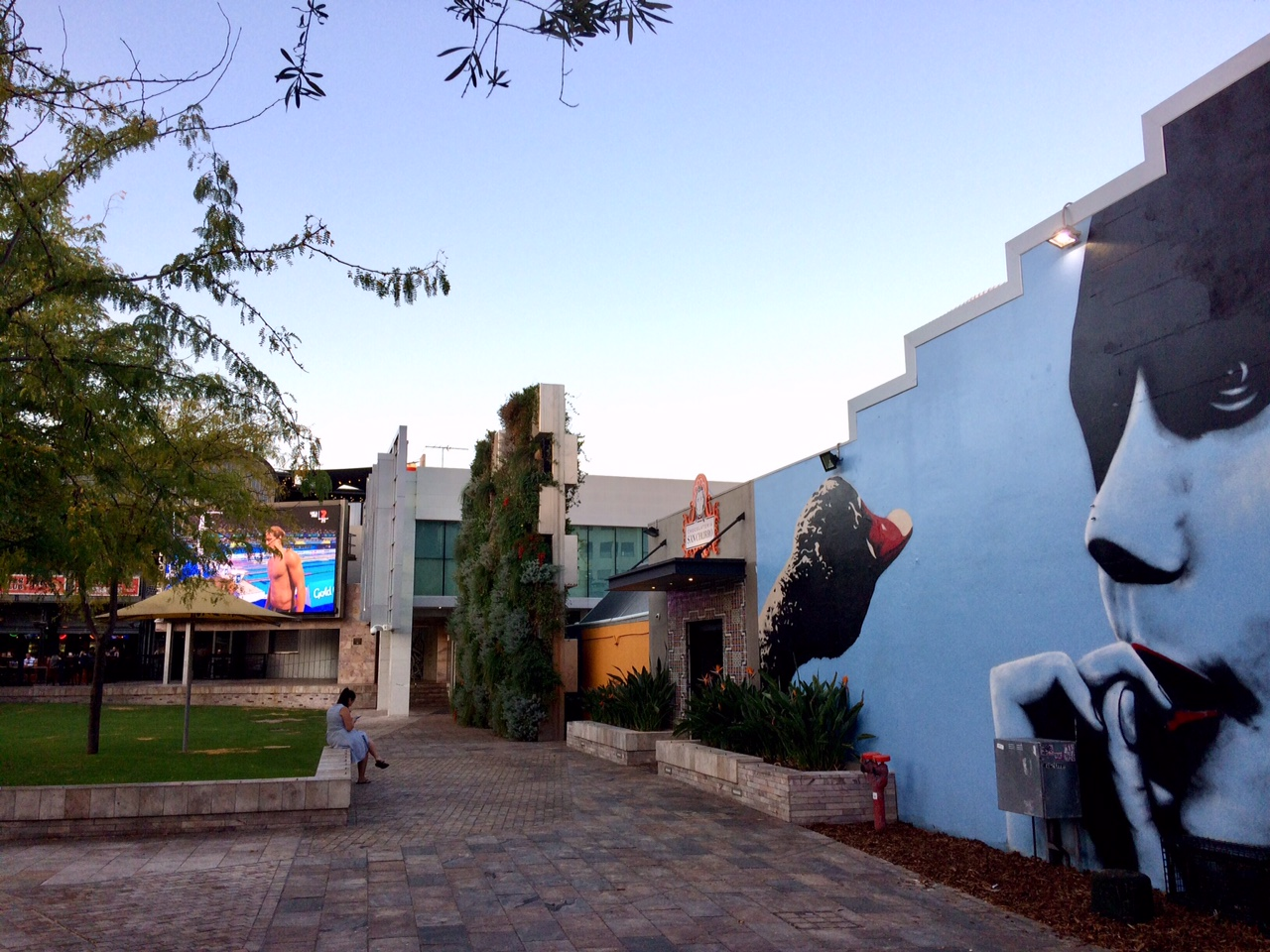
Northbridge Piazza at northeast corner of James and Lake streets intersection

Northbridge presently is a multicultural precinct, and contains a wide array of cuisine, including Asian and Mediterranean cuisine, and contains Perth's main nightlife district, which is centred on James Street and Lake Street. Northbridge's restaurant, cafe and bar scene varies from laneway bars and hole in the wall eateries, to prominent multi storey venues such as the Brass Monkey and Metro City concert club. Northbridge also hosts Perth's main Chinatown area centred around Chung Wah Lane.

The area has a historical connection to the Greek and Italian communities, with Perth's first Orthodox Church located on Parker Street.

The main public open space area in the suburb is at Russell Square. The Northbridge Piazza also serves as an open air communal space, which has been used as a venue to show free movies, live music performances, and broadcasts of popular sporting events.

In March 2018, Yagan Square was officially opened, a new public space between the CBD and Northbridge. The Digital Tower, the Marketplace and recreational areas are now available for tourists and residents.

== Northbridge History Project ==
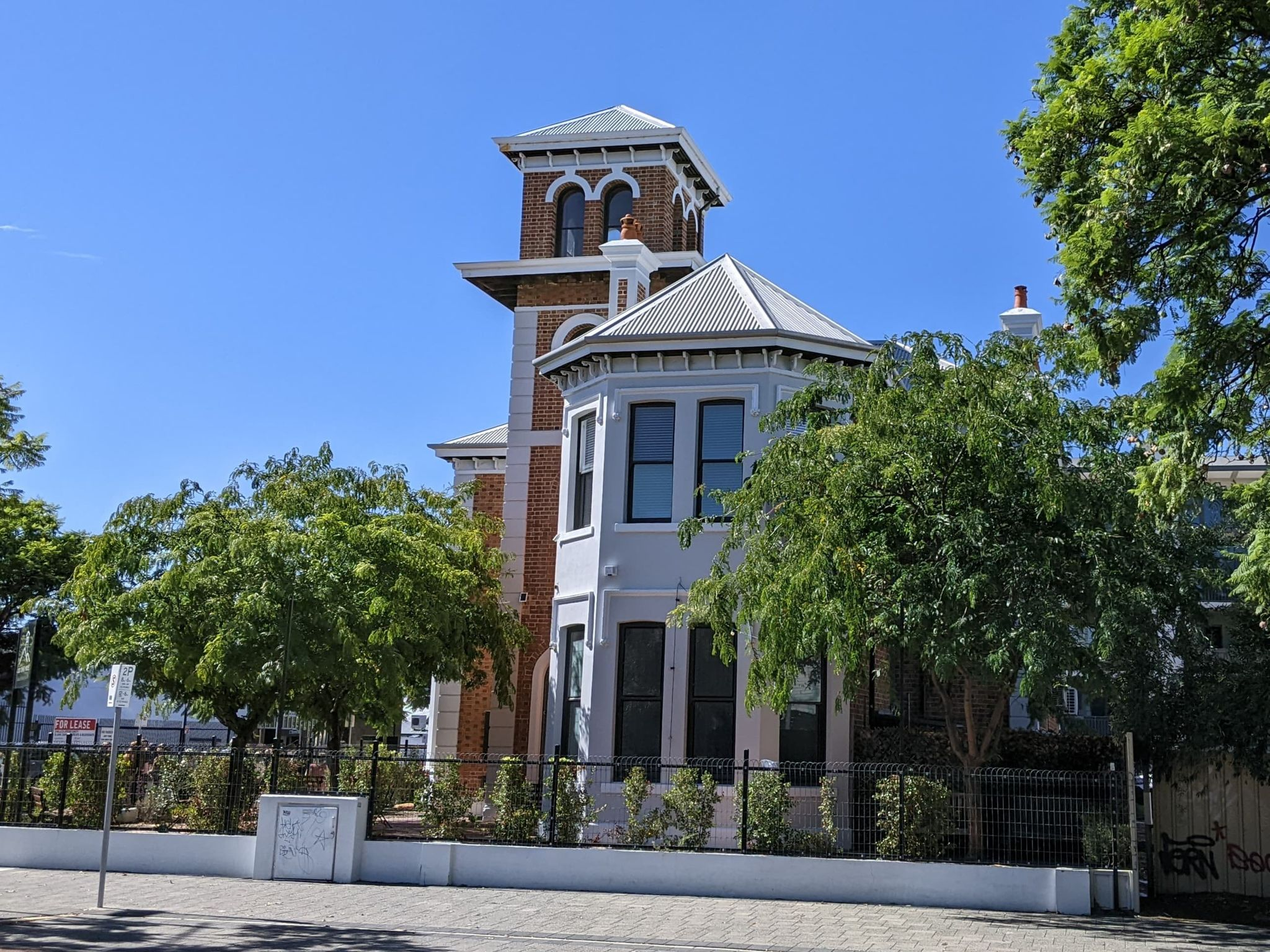
Old Tower House, Northbridge

In the early 2000s the Northbridge History Project was supported by the Government of Western Australia, on the recommendation of a report to the Premier Richard Court. The project finished in 2010.

Northbridge History Study Days were conducted in 2007, 2008, 2009 and 2010.

During the project duration publications were produced, and an archive of the project was made, with publications and reports available on the project website.

The book published in 2009 compiling the Study Days papers had the following items from two years:

=== Papers from 2007 ===
- Felicity Morel-EdnieBrown The swamp stealers : topography and change in Northbridge
- Jenny Gregory Northbridge and Carlton : ethnoscapes of consumption?
- Susanna Iuliano Espresso bar lifestyle : Italian migrants and cafe culture in Northbridge, Western Australia
- Nonja Peters On the street where you live : inner city immigrant enterprise
- John N. Yiannakis 'The chicken of the egg', Greek settlement in Northbridge : Greeks in metropolitan Western Australia

=== Papers from 2008 ===
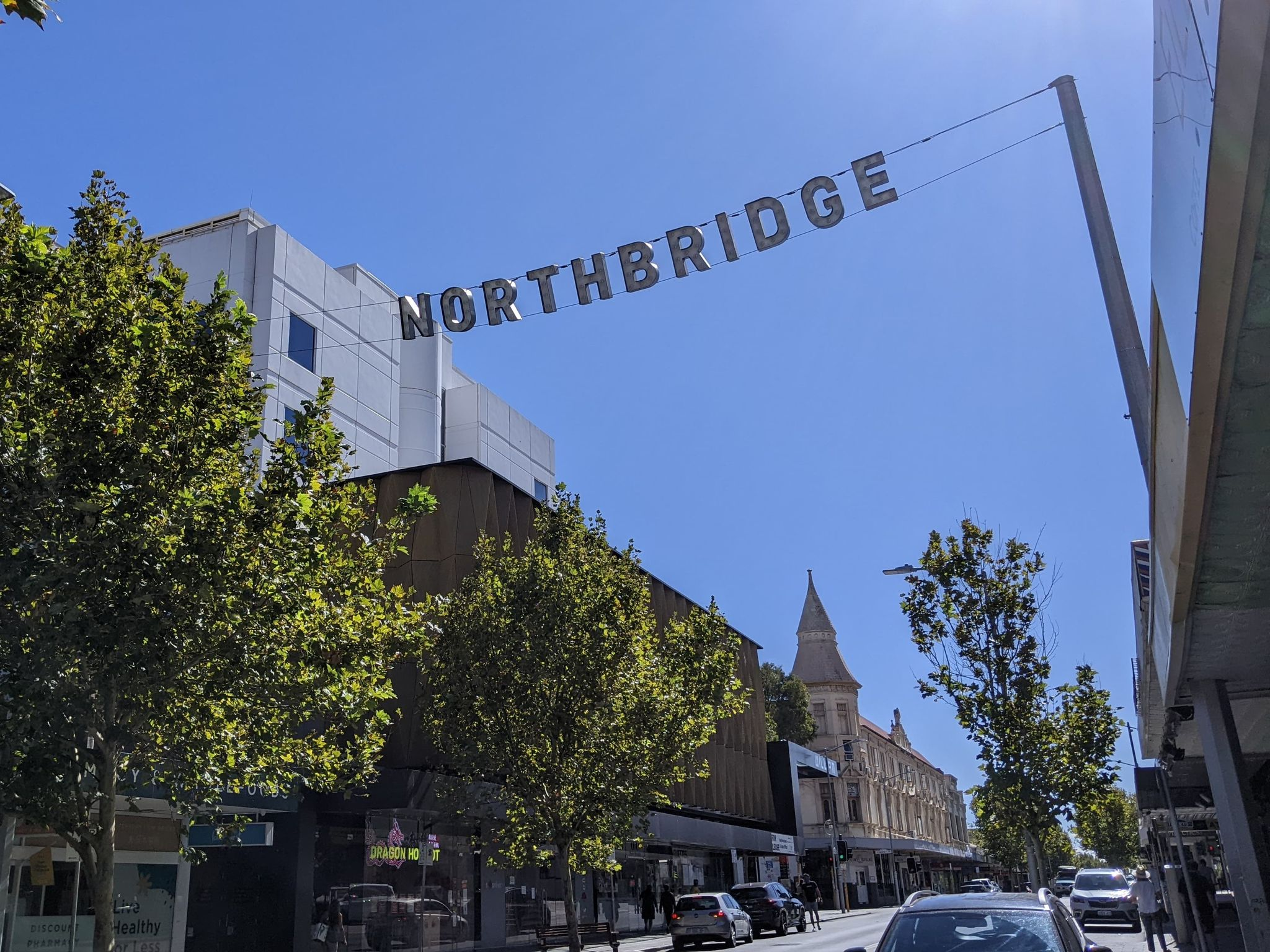
The Northbridge sign on William Street

- Emma Benichou Northbridge through the eyes of a 'Flaneur'
- Geoffrey Bolton Northbridge as microcosm
- Richard Offen Northbridge heritage : friend or foe
- Peter Conole The Northbridge era in Western Australian policing
- Bobbie Oliver 'Be workmen true, to workmen still', labor history and heritage in Northbridge
- Keith B. Shilkin Jewish Northbridge
- Christine Choo Socially and economically disadvantaged in Northbridge : a recent history (1960s-2007)
- Kirrily Jordan and Jock Collins Cosmopolitan Northbridge : a changing inner-city ethnic landscape

== Transport ==
=== Bus ===
- Blue CAT Perth Busport to Kings Park (free service) – serves Fitzgerald Street and Aberdeen Street

Bus routes serving Fitzgerald Street:

- 19 Perth Busport to Flinders Square
- 360 and 361 Perth Busport to Alexander Heights Shopping Centre (limited stops)
- 362 Perth Busport to Ballajura (limited stops)
- 960 Curtin University Bus Station to Mirrabooka Bus Station (high frequency)

== Perth City Link ==
The former separation of the Perth CBD and Northbridge has been changed through the Perth City Link project - which saw the former railway yard that was just to the west of the Perth railway station changed to an urban development project. Northbridge now connects through to the Perth CBD through Yagan Square and Manatj Park.

== Notable people ==
Notable people from or who have lived in Northbridge include:

- Gum Yuen (1875 – 1943), Chinese Australian furniture maker and restaurateur

== Gallery ==
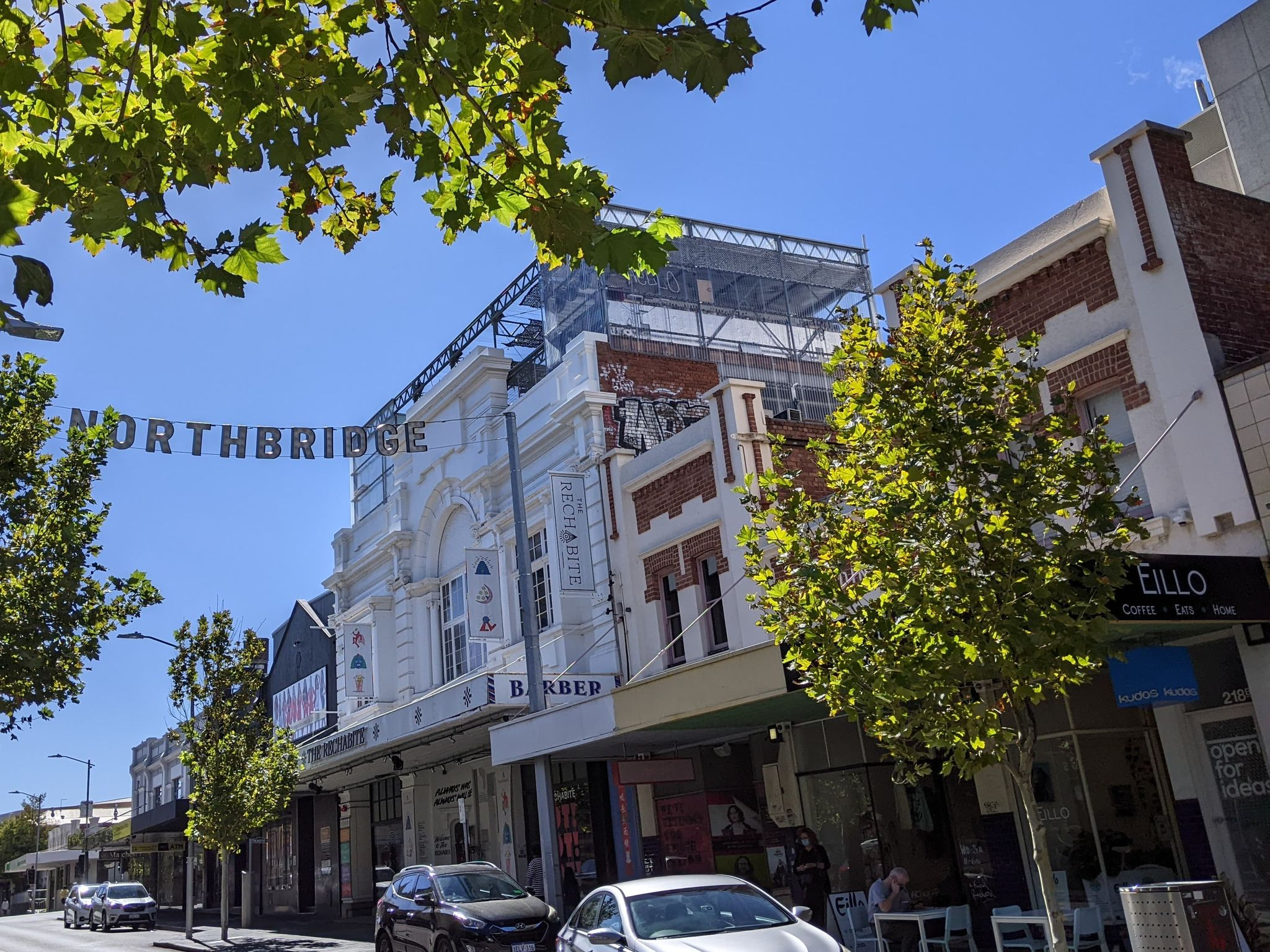
Sign and Rechabite

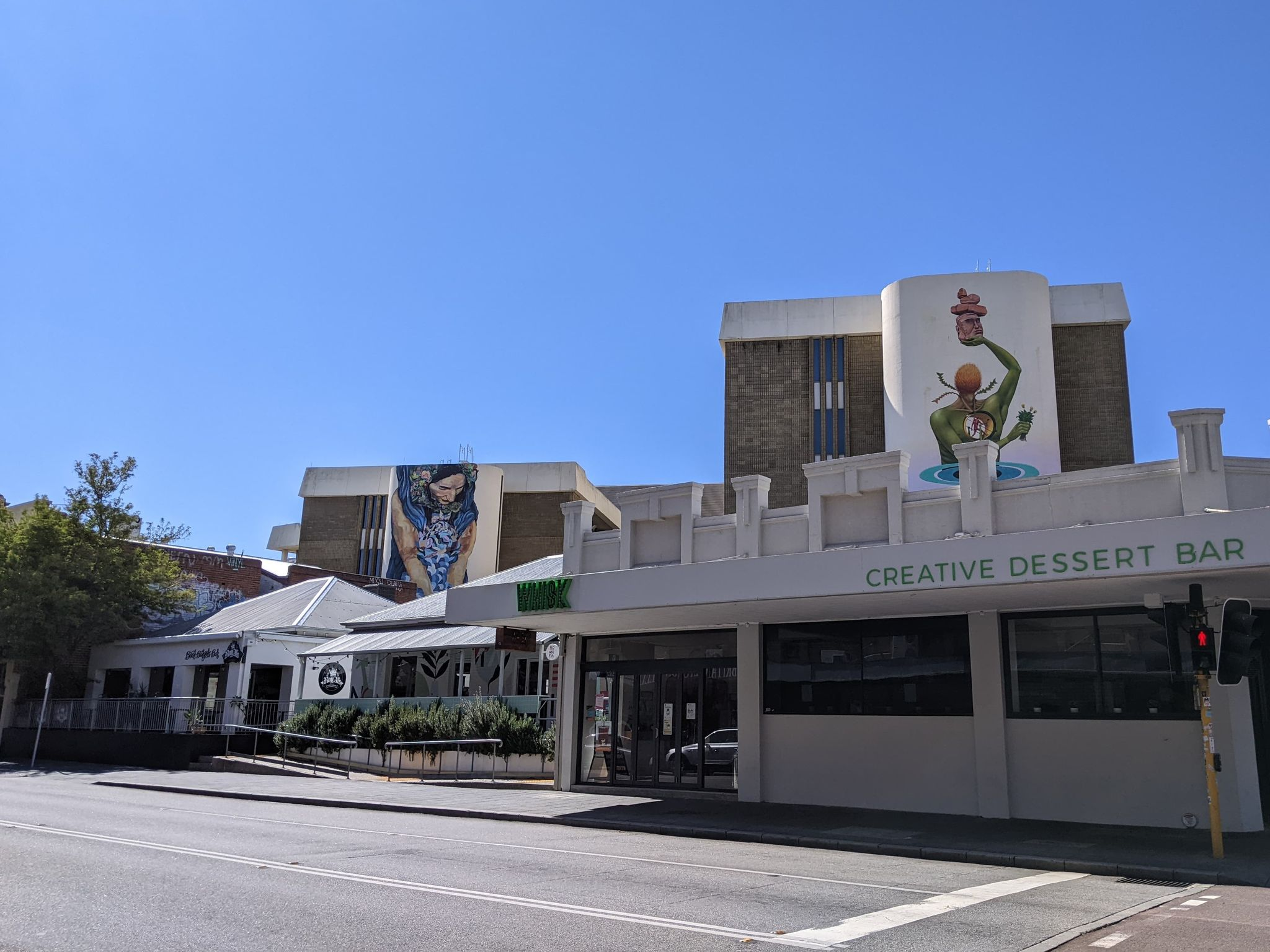
View of TAFE buildings across William Street

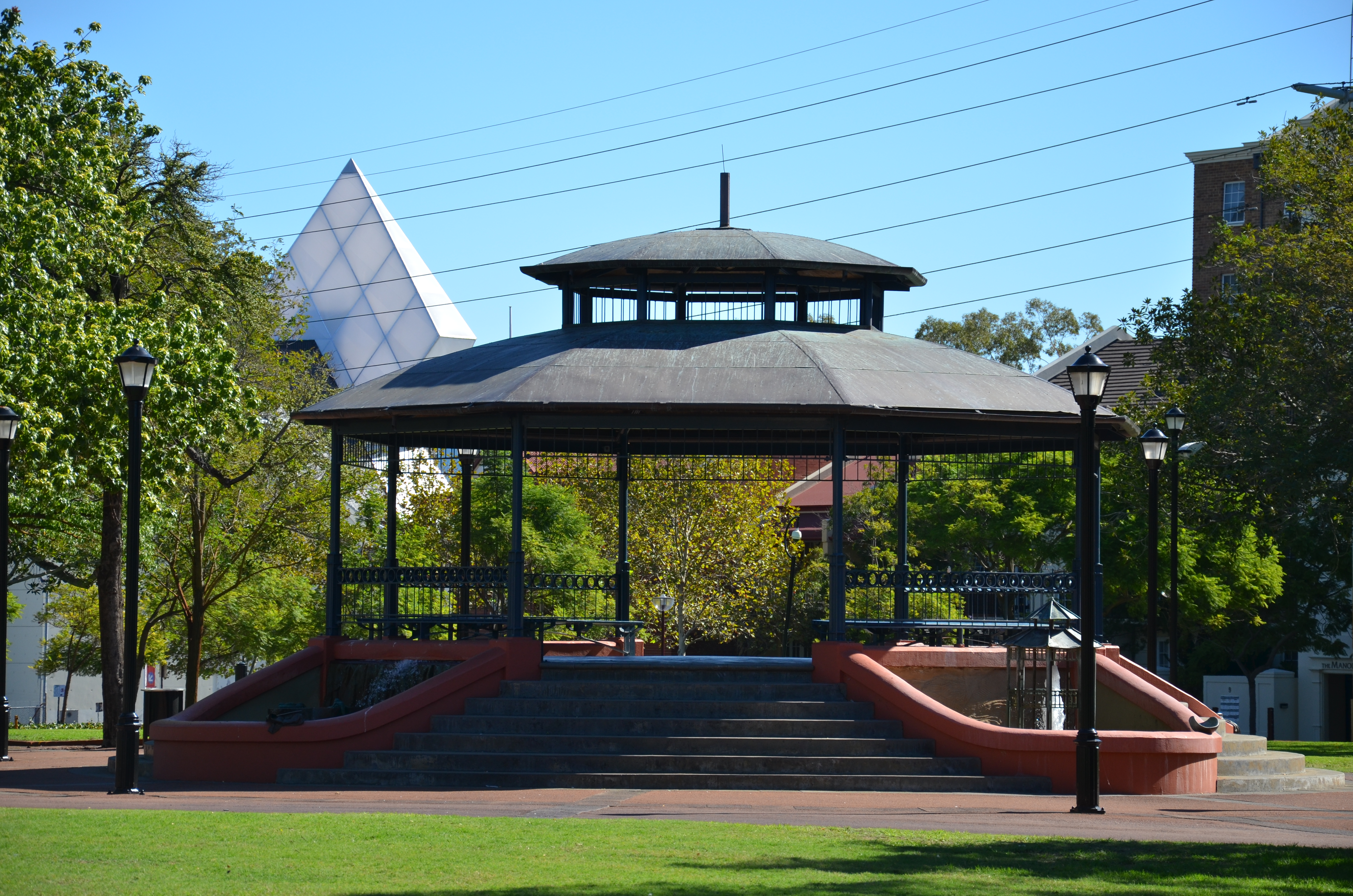
Gazebo in centre of Russell Square

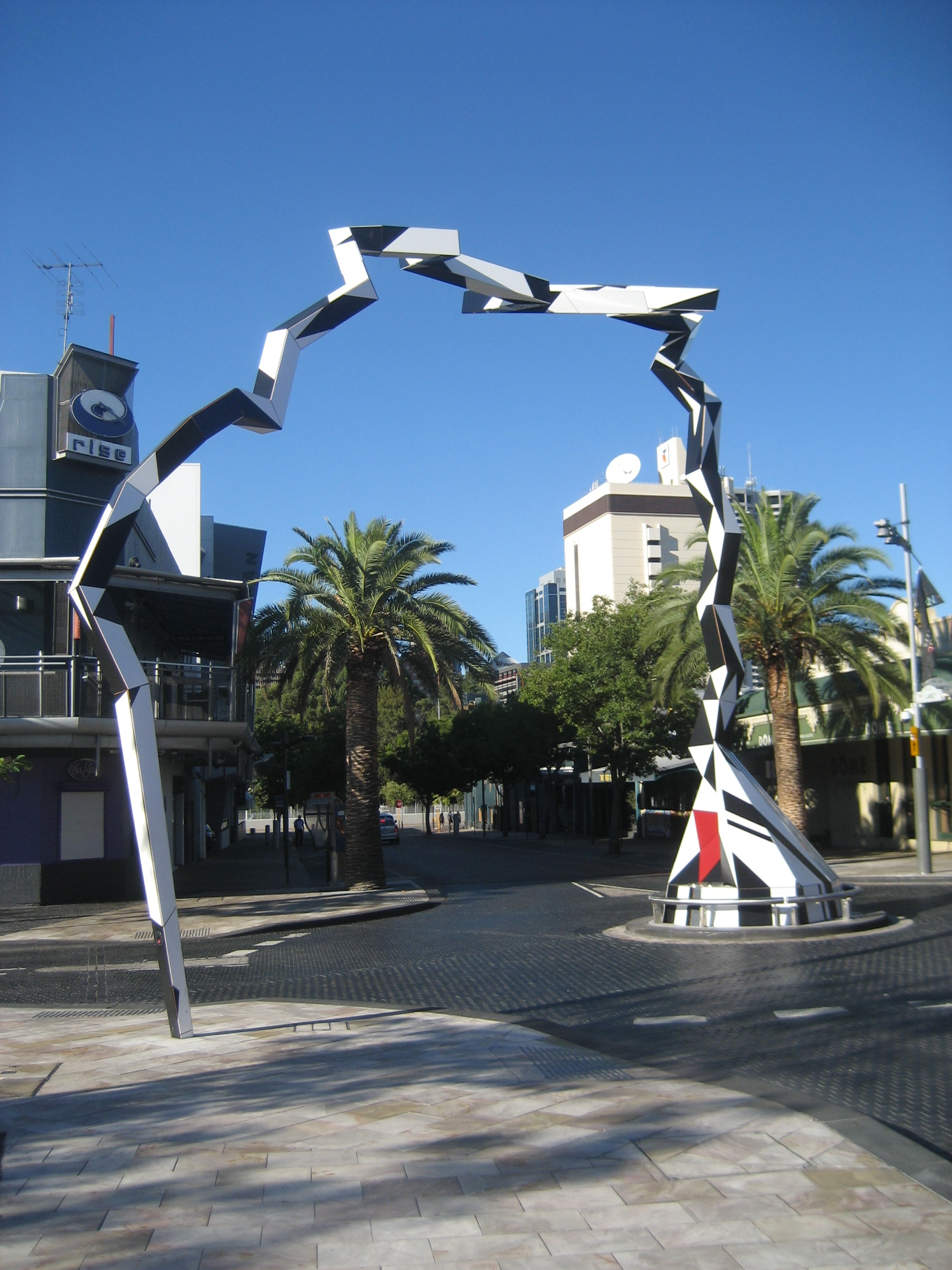
Arch before it was removed

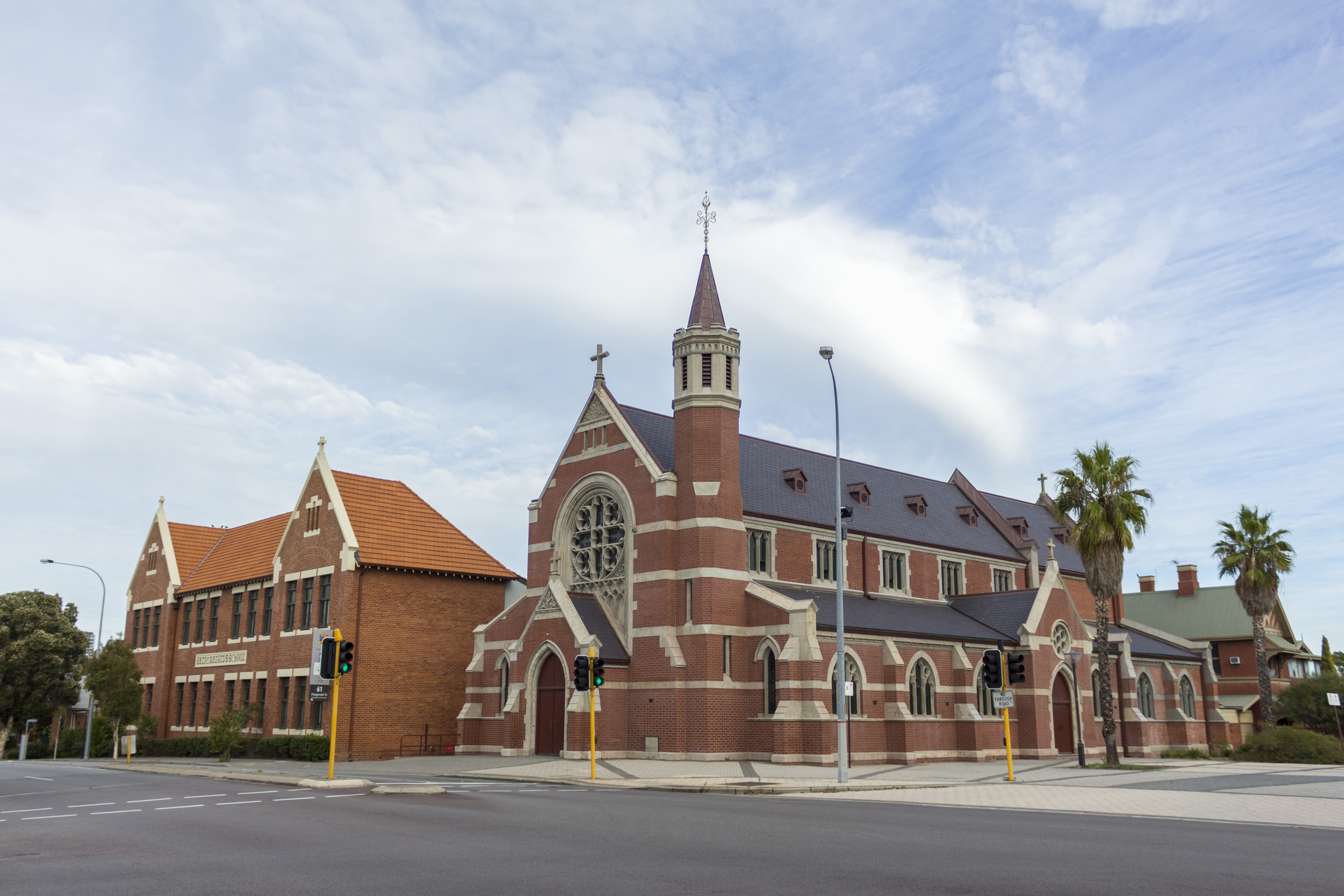
St Brigid's church and school

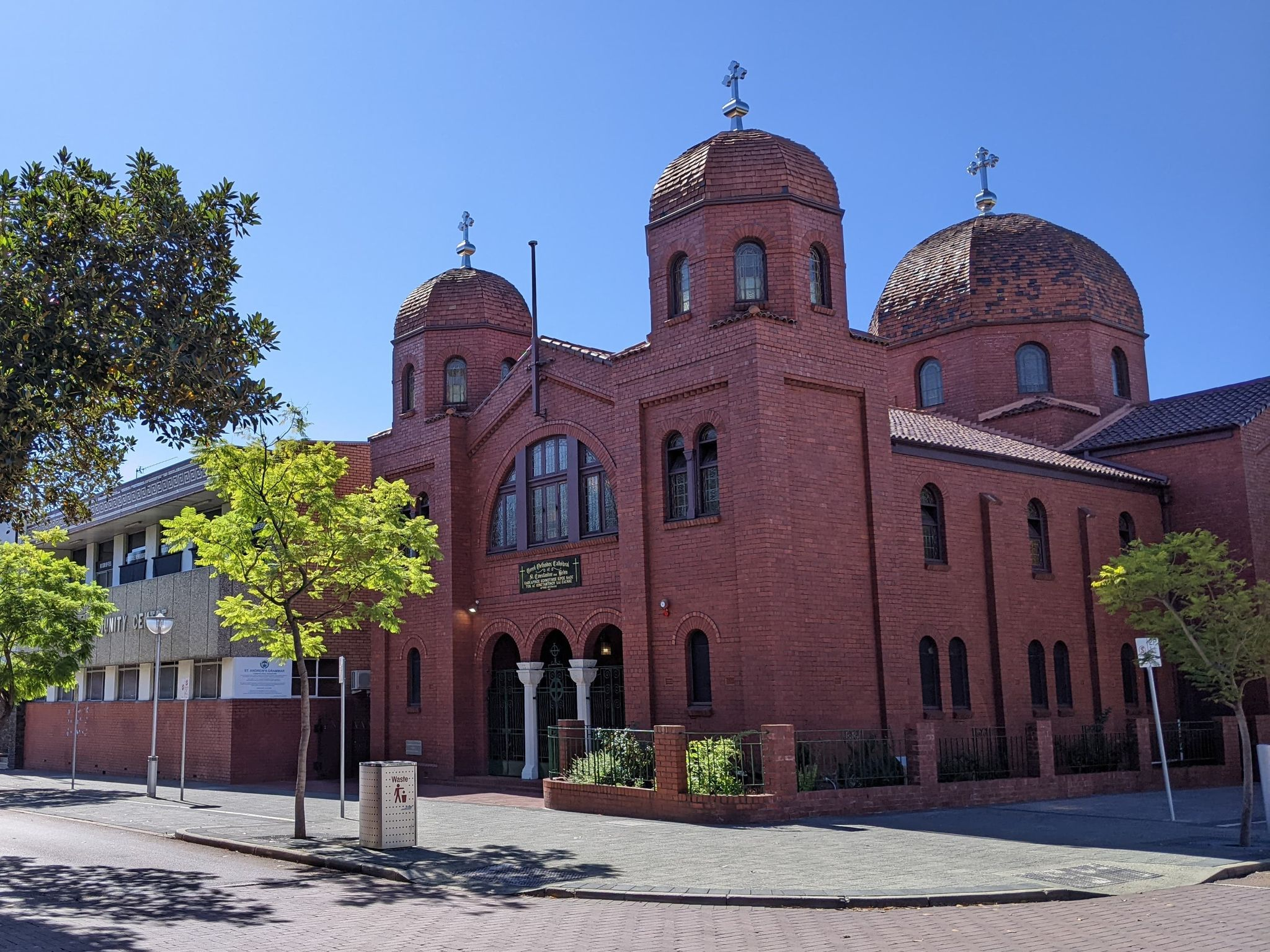
Greek Orthodox Cathedral of Saints Constantine and Helene
