= List of bridges in Perth, Western Australia =

This is a list of major bridges in Perth, Western Australia. Most bridges cross either the Swan River or the Canning River, the two main rivers that traverse the Swan Coastal Plain. Others are overpasses for major roads.

== Road bridges ==
Name	Image	Length	Location	Coordinates	Carries	Crosses	Notes
Barrack Street Bridge			Perth	31.95191°S 115.86156°E	Beaufort Street	Fremantle railway line	
Canning Bridge		175 m (574 ft)	Como – Applecross	32.010972°S 115.853194°E	Canning Highway	Canning River	
The Causeway		341 m (1,120 ft)	East Perth – Victoria Park	31.966806°S 115.886000°E	The Causeway (road)	Swan River	Comprises two bridges meeting at Heirisson Island
Garratt Road Bridge		240 m (790 ft)	Bayswater – Ascot	31.9324°S 115.9164°E	Garratt Road	Swan River	
Horseshoe Bridge		280 m (920 ft)	Perth	31.95083°S 115.85944°E	William Street	Fremantle railway line	
Mooro-Beeloo Bridge		271 m (889 ft)	Bayswater – Redcliffe	31.930194°S 115.937028°E	Tonkin Highway	Swan River	Known as Redcliffe Bridge until December 2023
Mount Henry Bridge		660 m (2,170 ft)	Salter Point – Brentwood	32.03333°S 115.85861°E	Kwinana Freeway	Canning River	Also a railway bridge
Narrows Bridge		397 m (1,302 ft)	Perth – South Perth	31.96333°S 115.84694°E	Kwinana Freeway	Swan River	Three parallel bridges; also a railway bridge
Riverton Bridge		100 m (330 ft)	Riverton – Wilson	32.027833°S 115.9013194°E	Fern Road	Canning River	
Shelley Bridge		240 m (790 ft)	Shelley – Wilson	32.0237°S 115.9017°E	Leach Highway	Canning River	
Stirling Bridge		400 m (1,300 ft)	North Fremantle – East Fremantle	32.0392°S 115.7593°E	Stirling Highway	Swan River	
Walley Bridge		61 m (200 ft)	Wellard – Baldivis	32.2718°S 115.8451°E	Kwinana Freeway	Millar Road, Rail Line 13	
Walyalup Bridge		230 m (750 ft)	North Fremantle – Fremantle	32.0410°S 115.7546°E	Queen Victoria Street	Swan River	Known as Fremantle Traffic Bridge until October 2026. Rebuilt in 2026.
Windan Bridge		406 m (1,332 ft)	East Perth – Burswood	31.9474°S 115.8828°E	Graham Farmer Freeway	Swan River	Runs alongside Goongoongup Bridge

== Railway bridges ==
Name	Image	Location	Coordinates	Carries	Crosses	Notes
Bunbury Bridge		East Perth	31.94794°S 115.88286°E		Swan River	1930 to 1996
Goongoongup Bridge		East Perth – Burswood	31.9477°S 115.8829°E	Armadale and Thornlie railway lines	Swan River	1995 to present
Mount Henry Bridge		Salter Point – Brentwood	32.03333°S 115.85861°E	Mandurah railway line	Canning River	
Narrows Bridge		Perth – South Perth	31.96333°S 115.84694°E	Mandurah railway line	Swan River	

== Pedestrian bridges ==
Name	Image	Location	Coordinates	Crosses	Notes
Boorloo Bridge		East Perth – Victoria Park	31.96556°S 115.88278°E	Swan River	
Elizabeth Quay Bridge		Perth	31.95923°S 115.85581°E	Elizabeth Quay	
Matagarup Bridge		East Perth	31.954°S 115.885°E	Swan River	
The Kids' Bridge		Nedlands	31.96778°S 115.81778°E	Winthrop Avenue	
Trafalgar Bridge		East Perth	31.95193°S 115.88022°E	Claisebrook Cove	

== See also ==
- Swan River (Western Australia) § Bridges

== General references ==
- Main Roads Western Australia (June 2014). "Special Purpose Vehicle Restricted Bridges: Perth Metropolitan and Mandurah Area" (PDF) (24th ed.). Government of Western Australia. Archived from the original (PDF) on 16 December 2014.
