= List of State Register of Heritage Places in the City of Vincent =

The State Register of Heritage Places is maintained by the Heritage Council of Western Australia. As of 2026, 451 places are heritage-listed in the City of Vincent, of which 64 are on the State Register of Heritage Places.

== List ==
The Western Australian State Register of Heritage Places, as of 2026, lists the following 64 state registered places within the City of Vincent:

Place name	Place #	Street number	Street name	Suburb or town	Co-ordinates	Notes & former names	Photo
Lindsay Street Flour Mill & Bakery Complex	996	12 & 22	Lindsay Street	Perth	31.946534°S 115.863702°E		
Baker's Terrace	1000	156-184	Lake Street	Perth	31.943277°S 115.859992°E		
Brisbane Street Post Office	1971	115	Brisbane Street	Perth	31.943669°S 115.864239°E	North Perth Post Office	
Dilhorn House	2168	2	Bulwer Street	Perth	31.942312°S 115.866923°E	Army Museum, Loton House, Loton Park	
St Alban's Church, Highgate	2178	449	Beaufort Street	Highgate	31.940261°S 115.867939°E		
Highgate Primary School	2180	147	Lincoln Street	Perth	31.941145°S 115.866367°E		
Sacred Heart Catholic Group, Highgate	2181	40	Mary Street	Highgate	31.937280°S 115.868147°E	Consists of Monastery of Our Lady of the Sacred Heart (2182), Sacred Heart Church Hall (13034) and Sacred Heart Church (23930),	
Monastery of Our Lady of the Sacred Heart (former)	2182	42	Mary Street	Highgate	31.937050°S 115.867581°E	Sacred Heart Convent (former), Sacred Heart Convent & School	
St Mary's Catholic Church	2196	40	Franklin Street	Leederville	31.927039°S 115.843169°E		
St Mary's Hall	2202	336	Oxford Street	Leederville	31.927650°S 115.841569°E		
Leederville Post Office	2203	156	Oxford Street	Leederville	31.936242°S 115.841455°E		
North Perth Police Station	2212	81	Angove Street	North Perth	31.929281°S 115.855550°E	North Perth Police Station and Quarters	
North Perth Post Office (former)	2215	21A	View Street	North Perth	31.931969°S 115.857039°E		
North Perth Town Hall Complex	2216	24 - 26	View Street	North Perth	31.931448°S 115.856654°E	North Perth Lesser Hall, North Perth Main Hall	
Redemptorist Monastery and Church	2218	190	Vincent Street	North Perth	31.935833°S 115.856389°E		
Charles St Methodist Mission Chapel & Methodist Church	2237	113	Charles Street	West Perth	31.941401°S 115.851712°E	Uniting Church and Methodist Mission Chapel, Wesleyan Church and Chapel (former)	
Newcastle Street Government School	2241	480	Newcastle Street	West Perth	31.941290°S 115.851128°E	Newcastle Street Infants & Seniors School, West Perth School, St Johns C of E School	
Perth Oval	2992	27	Bulwer Street	Perth	31.945950°S 115.870131°E	Loton Park, Members Equity Stadium, NIB Stadium	
Throssell House, Perth	2993	15	Throssell Street	Perth	31.937050°S 115.859450°E	Wedderburn	
Terrace Houses, 225-227 Beaufort Street	3133	225	Beaufort Street	Perth	31.945765°S 115.864680°E	Two Terrace Houses	
Terrace Houses, 235-241 Beaufort Street	3134	235-241	Beaufort Street	Perth	31.945468°S 115.864833°E	Terrace Houses, Residences & Goodridge Galleries	
Lincoln Street Ventilation Stack	3137	57	Lincoln Street	Highgate	31.942400°S 115.870800°E	Dumas' Folly	
East Perth Power Station	3318	11	Summers Street	East Perth	31.946251°S 115.880239°E		
Anzac Cottage	3344	38	Kalgoorlie Street	Mount Hawthorn	31.923499°S 115.834745°E		
Shops, 452-460 William Street	3485	452-460	William Street	Perth	31.943221°S 115.863196°E		
Loton Park Tennis Club	3536	Corner	Bulwer & Lord Streets	Perth	31.945261°S 115.871700°E		
Beatty Park Leisure Centre & Beatty Park	3553	220	Vincent Street	North Perth	31.935556°S 115.848889°E	Beatty Aquatic Centre, City of Perth Aquatic Centre	
Brookman & Moir Streets Precinct	3992		Moir & Brookman Streets & Forbes Road	Perth	31.943862°S 115.860685°E		
Highgate Hill Police Station, Lockup & Quarters (former)	4282	57	Lincoln Street	Perth	31.942836°S 115.870636°E	Highgate Police Station, Lockup & Quarters	
Hyde Park	4634		Vincent Street	Highgate	31.937781°S 115.862500°E	Third Swamp, Third Swamp Reserve	
Maltings Plant (former)	4648	33-35	Stuart Street	Perth	31.943134°S 115.856521°E	Union Maltings, Union Brewery, Harwood's Brewery, Perth Pneumatic Maltings	
Bowra and O'Dea Beaufort Street	8586	359	Beaufort Street	Perth	31.942244°S 115.866944°E	Pensioner Funeral Services, Arthur E. Davies & Co.	
Robertson Park and Archaeological Sites	8705	176	Fitzgerald Street, Randell, Palmerston & Stuart Streets	Perth	31.940902°S 115.857185°E	Lake Henderson	
Aranmore Catholic College Group	8709		30-42 Franklin Street & 338-342 Shakespeare Street	Leederville	31.927694°S 115.843000°E	Arranmore, St Mary's Convent and School, St Mary's College, Christian Brothers College	
Stables (former), 17 Lindsay Street	8723	15-17	Lindsay Street	Perth	31.946189°S 115.863200°E		
Mackays Aerated Waters Factory (former)	8728	Oct-22	Money Street	Perth	31.945988°S 115.862940°E	Chas Hopkins Office Interiors Bulkstores, Mackay & Co, Mackays Aerated Waters	
Oddfellows Hall (former), Leederville	8736	217	Oxford Street	Leederville	31.933628°S 115.840938°E	Oddfellows Hall, IOOF Buffaloes Lodge (former)	
Serbian Orthodox Church of St. Sava	8746	31	Smith Street	Highgate	31.941522°S 115.870564°E		
North Perth Fire Station (former)	8749	21	View Street	North Perth	31.932011°S 115.857200°E		
Drill Hall, Leederville	8764	177	Oxford Street	Leederville	31.936144°S 115.840135°E	RAAF Barracks & Drill Hall, Leederville Mechanics' Institute	
Dwelling, Caretaker's House, Robertson Park	11436	176	Fitzgerald Street	North Perth	31.941147°S 115.855769°E	Robertson Park & Associated Buildings	
Silver Chain Nursing League Building	11451	19	Wright Street	Perth	31.943125°S 115.871794°E		
Parry Street Precinct	11543		Parry Street & Pier Street	Perth	31.948233°S 115.867285°E		
Sacred Heart Church Hall	13034	42	Mary Street	Highgate	31.937053°S 115.867584°E		
Walcott Centre	15731	3	Walcott Street	Mount Lawley	31.938594°S 115.876186°E	Walcott Street Reception Home, Government Receiving Depot, Child Welfare Rec	
Two Attached Houses	15787	147-149	Parry Street	Perth	31.947669°S 115.866181°E		
House	15788	145	Parry Street	Perth	31.948180°S 115.867170°E		
Two Conjoined Houses	15789	143	Parry Street	Perth	31.947739°S 115.866361°E		
Two Attached Houses	15790	139-141	Parry Street	Perth	31.947789°S 115.866461°E		
Two Attached Houses	15791	135-137	Parry Street	Perth	31.947777°S 115.866646°E		
House	15793	111	Parry Street	Perth	31.947650°S 115.866328°E		
Two Attached Houses	15794	107-109	Parry Street	Perth	31.948195°S 115.867470°E		
Two Attached Houses	15795	103-105	Parry Street	Perth	31.948333°S 115.867565°E		
Houses	15796	99-101	Parry Street	Perth	31.948361°S 115.867731°E		
Five Houses	15797	85-93	Parry Street	Perth	31.948460°S 115.867925°E		
House	15798	89	Parry Street	Perth	31.948492°S 115.867996°E		
North Perth Primary School	16789	3	Albert Street	North Perth	31.930627°S 115.855879°E	School of Instrumental Music, North Perth Infants School, Toorak/Woodville PS	
Tudor Lodge	17150	57 & 59	Chelmsford Road	Mount Lawley	31.935894°S 115.867214°E	Mean-Myne, Tudor Lodge Family & Children's, Services Hostel	
North Perth Town Hall - Lesser Hall	18079	20-26	View Street	North Perth	31.931449°S 115.856775°E		
North Perth Town Hall - Main Hall	18080	20-26	View Street	North Perth	31.931449°S 115.856775°E		
Sewerage Vent, Northbridge	23777		Stuart Street	Northbridge	31.942898°S 115.858066°E		
Sewerage Vent, Hyde Park, Highgate	23781		William Street	Highgate	31.939793°S 115.864266°E		
Sacred Heart Church	23930	40-42	Mary Street	Highgate	31.937280°S 115.868147°E		
Metropolitan Sewerage Vents	23992			East & West Perth, Highgate, Northbridge	31.942898°S 115.858066°E 31.939793°S 115.864266°E		
