= Restaurant Amusé =

Defunct restaurant in East Perth, Western Australia

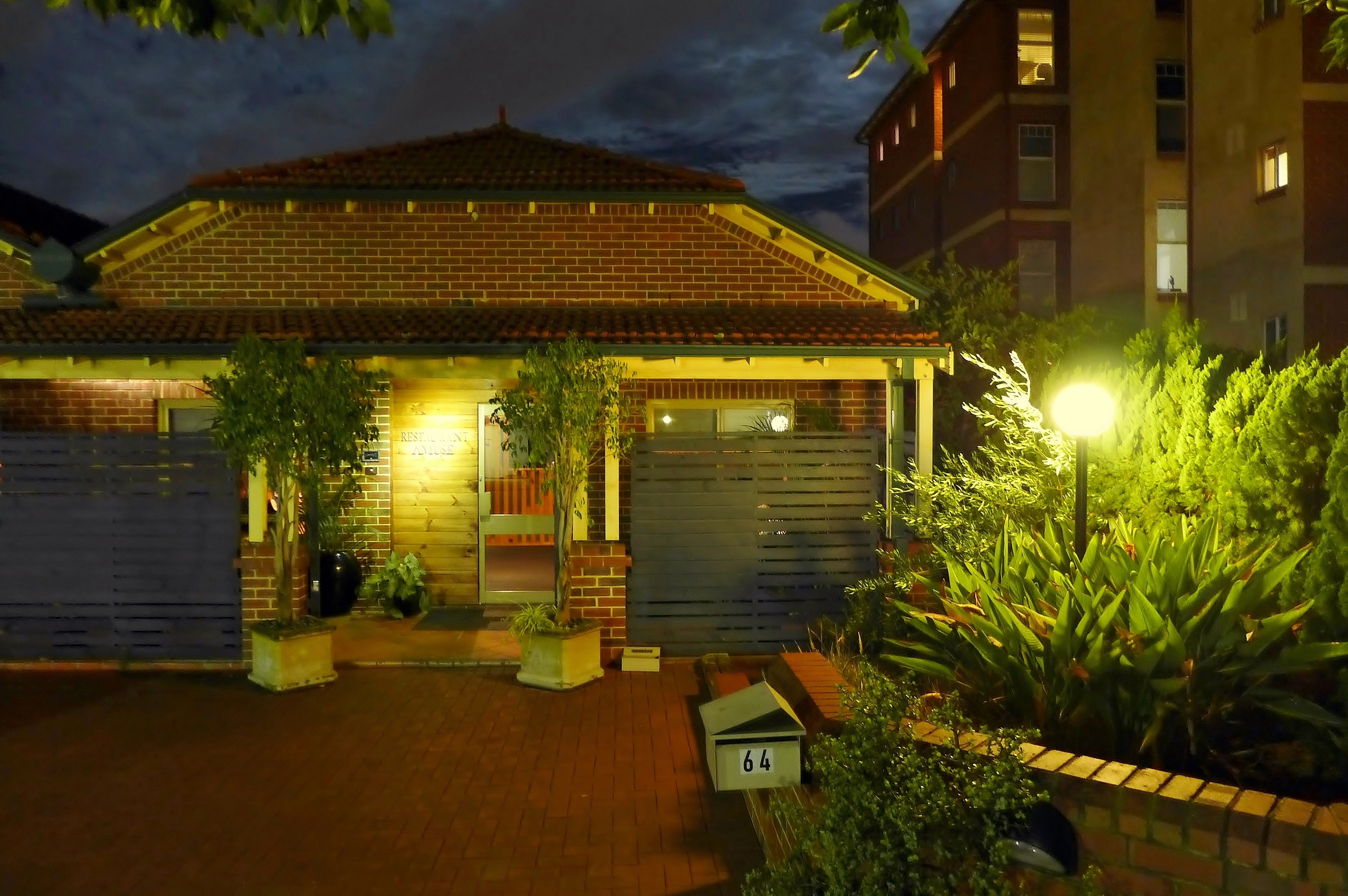
- Restaurant Amusé, 2017
- Interactive map of Restaurant Amusé

Restaurant information
- Established: 2007
- Chef: Hadleigh Troy
- Food type: Modern Australian
- Location: 64 Bronte Street, East Perth, Western Australia, 6004, Australia
- Coordinates: 31°57′18″S 115°52′26″E

Restaurant Amusé was a restaurant in East Perth, Western Australia. It won many awards, including Restaurant of the Year and Best Fine Dining Restaurant in the national finals of the Savour Australia Restaurant and Catering Awards for Excellence 2010.

The restaurant's chef, Hadleigh Troy, was trained by leading Perth chefs Alain Fabregues and Neal Jackson. He later worked in Michelin-starred restaurants in the United Kingdom, and for Gordon Ramsay.

Restaurant Amusé offered only a degustation menu. It was given a two star rating, and the award for Restaurant of the Year, by The West Australian Good Food Guide 2013, and retained its two star rating for 2014. The restaurant was also named the best restaurant in Western Australia for eight consecutive years by Gourmet Traveller.

Although the restaurant, owned by Troy and his wife Carolynne, was tipped to fail when it opened, it was phenomenally successful and by 2012 Saturday nights were fully booked at least two months in advance.

After a decade in business the couple chose to close its doors at the end of their lease in 2017 in order to concentrate on family time.

== See also ==
- Australian cuisine
- Western Australian wine
