= Matagarup Bridge =

Pedestrian bridge in Perth, Western Australia

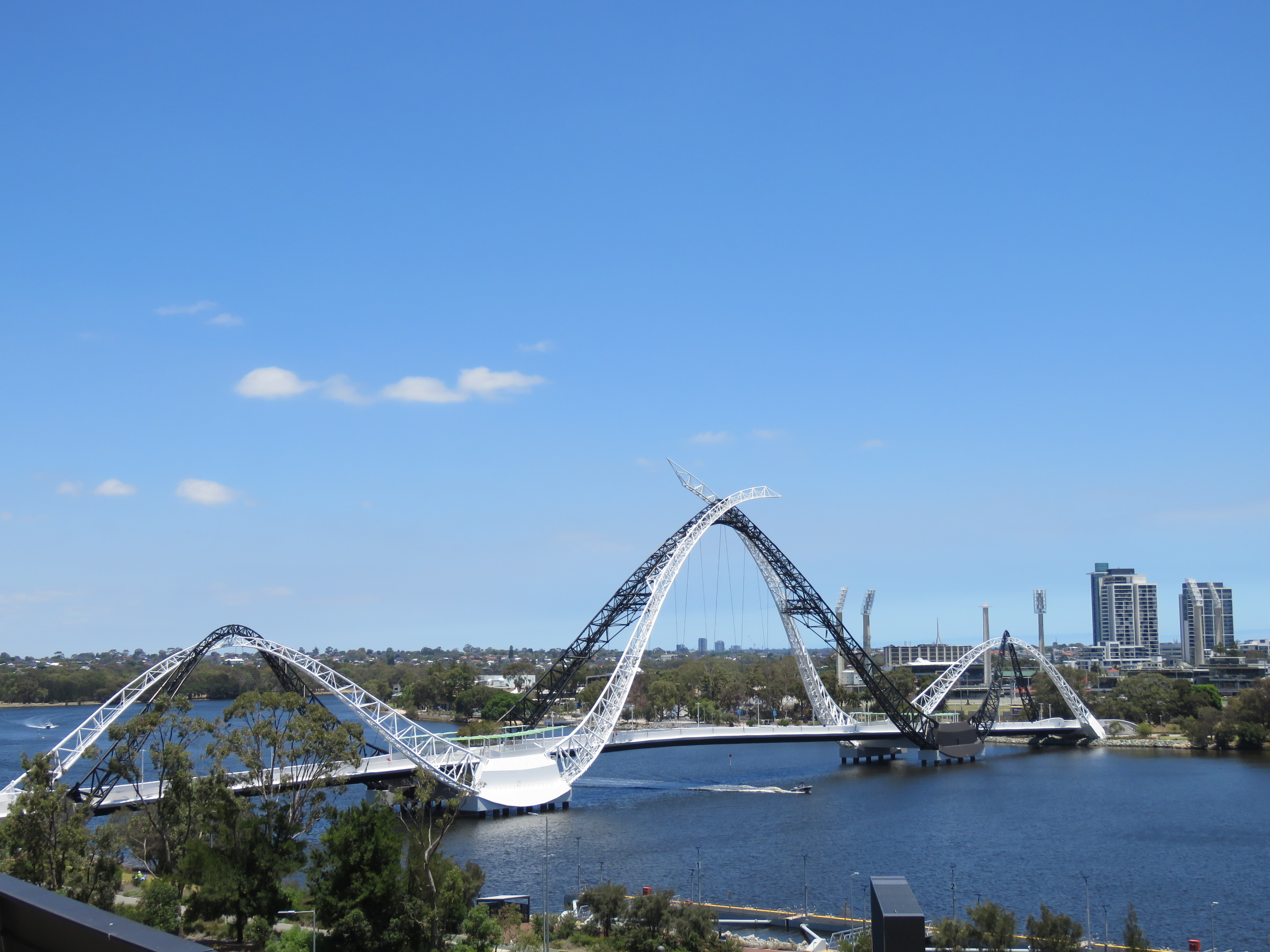
- Matagarup Bridge seen from Perth Stadium, December 2022
- Coordinates: 31°57′16″S 115°53′07″E
- Carries: Pedestrian and cycle traffic
- Crosses: Swan River

Characteristics
- Total length: 370 m (1,210 ft)
- Width: 9 m (30 ft)
- Height: 72 m (236 ft) at its highest point
- Longest span: 160 m (520 ft)
- Clearance below: 8 m (26 ft)

History
- Constructed by: York Civil/Rizzani de Eccher joint venture
- Construction start: November 2015
- Construction cost: $91.5 million
- Opened: 14 July 2018; 8 years ago

Location
- Interactive map of Matagarup Bridge

Matagarup Bridge is a suspension pedestrian bridge crossing over the Swan River in Perth, Western Australia. Situated approximately half-way between Heirisson Island and the Goongoongup Bridge, it provides pedestrian access between Burswood and East Perth. The bridge connects visitors to the Burswood Peninsula, including the Perth Stadium, with public transport and car parks in East Perth and the Perth central business district.

== History ==
In February 2014, the government called for expressions of interest for the design and construction of the bridge. Four parties were shortlisted to bid; a Decmil/OHL joint venture, Freyssinet, Georgiou, and a York Civil/Rizzani de Eccher joint venture with the latter awarded the contract. Western Australian company BARDAP Hydraulics was contracted to design, manufacture, and commission the high pressure jacking system which was deployed to install the deck sections.

Due to delays and issues, Malaysian-based Toyota Tsusho, which was sub-contracted to manufacture the bridge components, had its contract terminated; the contract was re-tendered and was won by Perth-based Civmec.

In November 2017, the Government announced that the bridge would officially be named "Matagarup Bridge", where "Matagarup " is the Nyungar name for the whole area – waters included – around Heirisson Island, and which means "place where the river is only leg deep, allowing it to be crossed". It had previously been referred to as the Swan River Pedestrian Bridge.

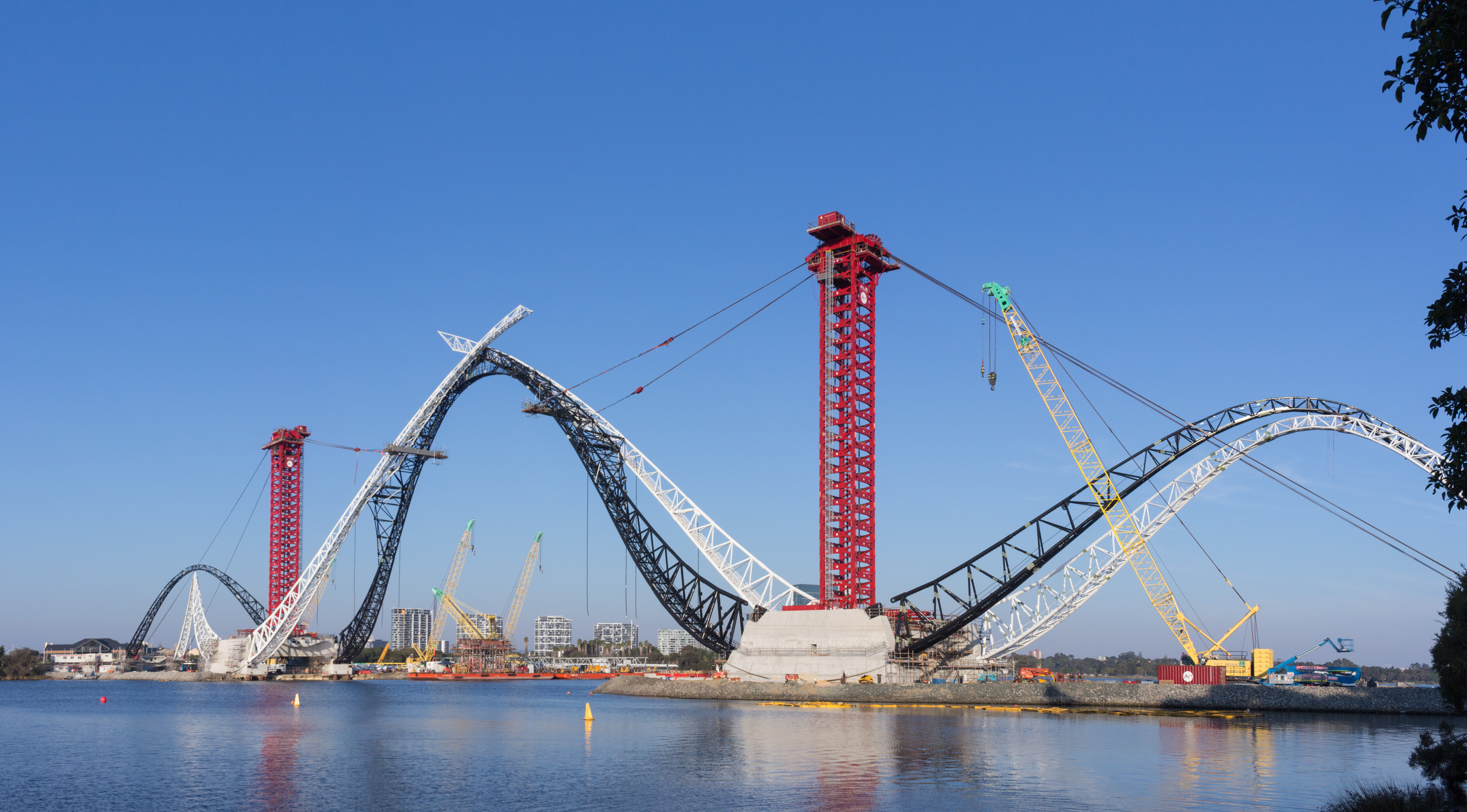
Matagarup Bridge without its concrete deck while under construction in May 2018

The bridge's two main arches were hoisted into place in early May 2018. Matagarup Bridge consists of three spans, each suspended from arches by cables. Each of the three deck sections was craned onto high pressure jacks, connected to flow control manifolds and electric hydraulic power units. The jacking system enabled the suspension cables to be connected to the respective bridge section, and then lowered with precision control to tension the cables. This work was completed in late June. Testing of the bridge's LED lighting occurred on 18 June. Concrete pouring of the bridge deck was completed on 1 July. On 4 July, Premier Mark McGowan, Transport Minister Rita Saffioti and other officials, as well as bridge workers, walked across the bridge. From 7–9 July, hundreds of volunteers walked across the bridge so that engineers could assess the movement of the structure and tune the bridge's mass damper to minimise vibrations.

The bridge was opened to the public on 14 July 2018. Landscaping and removal of the lay-down area and reclaimed land continued after the bridge was opened.

The bridge was the featured location for Australia's "Postcard" during the broadcast of Eurovision Song Contest 2023, showing the Australian entrant Voyager climbing and zip-lining from the bridge. It was featured alongside Kyiv's Glass Bridge and Clifton Suspension Bridge.

== Design ==
The structure is designed as a 3-span steel cable-stayed bridge, with the two piers in the river bed. The bridge maximum height of 72 metres (236 ft) is reached in midspan of the central span. The length between the abutments is 400 metres (1,300 ft), with a 160-metre-long (520 ft) central span. The total length of the pedestrian crossing is 560 metres (1,840 ft), which includes a 100-metre (330 ft) ramp at the East Perth end to route pedestrians away from nearby residential areas.

The bridge structural shape resembles two flying swans, with the bridge arches representing the wishbones, but it can also be seen as a swimming dolphin, a Wagyl serpent or a ribbon. 900 metres (3,000 ft) of multicolour LED lighting cover the bridge.

Design modifications were made to allow bridge climbing as a tourist attraction. The modifications included the addition of handrails along the wishbones and a viewing elevated platform; the structural design already included stairs for bridge inspection and maintenance works. Plans for a zip-line from the top of the bridge to the ground were also explored, and both attractions were later given the greenlight to proceed. Operated by Perth Bridge Climb and Zip, the bridge climb opened on 26 January 2021, with a zip-line from the bridge to the Burswood Peninsula later opening in December 2021 after several delays.

The estimated cost of the bridge, as of June 2015, was $54 million. As of January 2018, the construction cost had increased to $91.5 million.

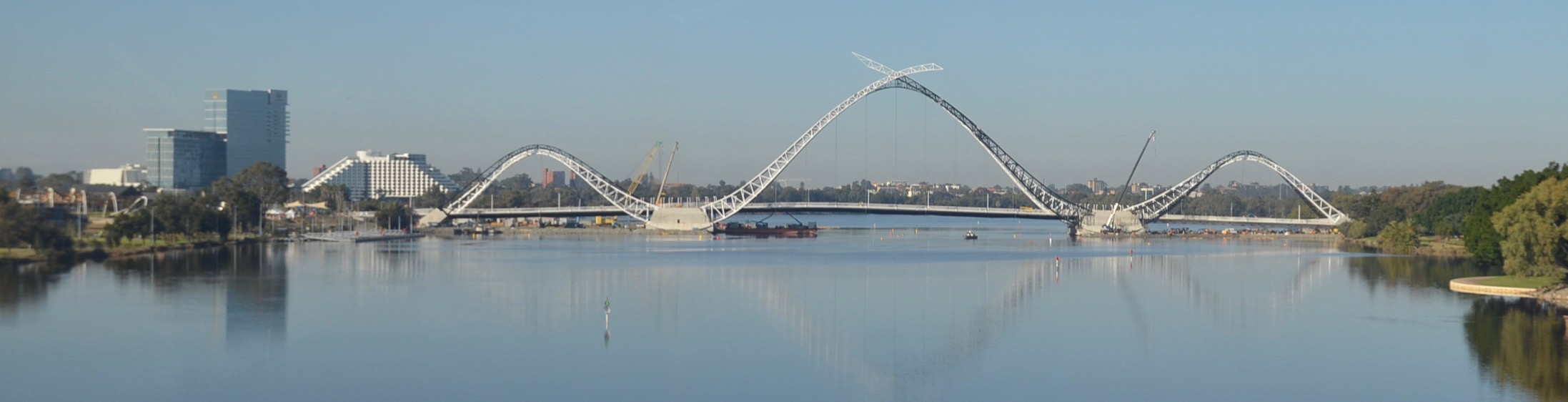
Matagarup Bridge viewed from the Goongoongup Bridge, 2018

== Gallery ==
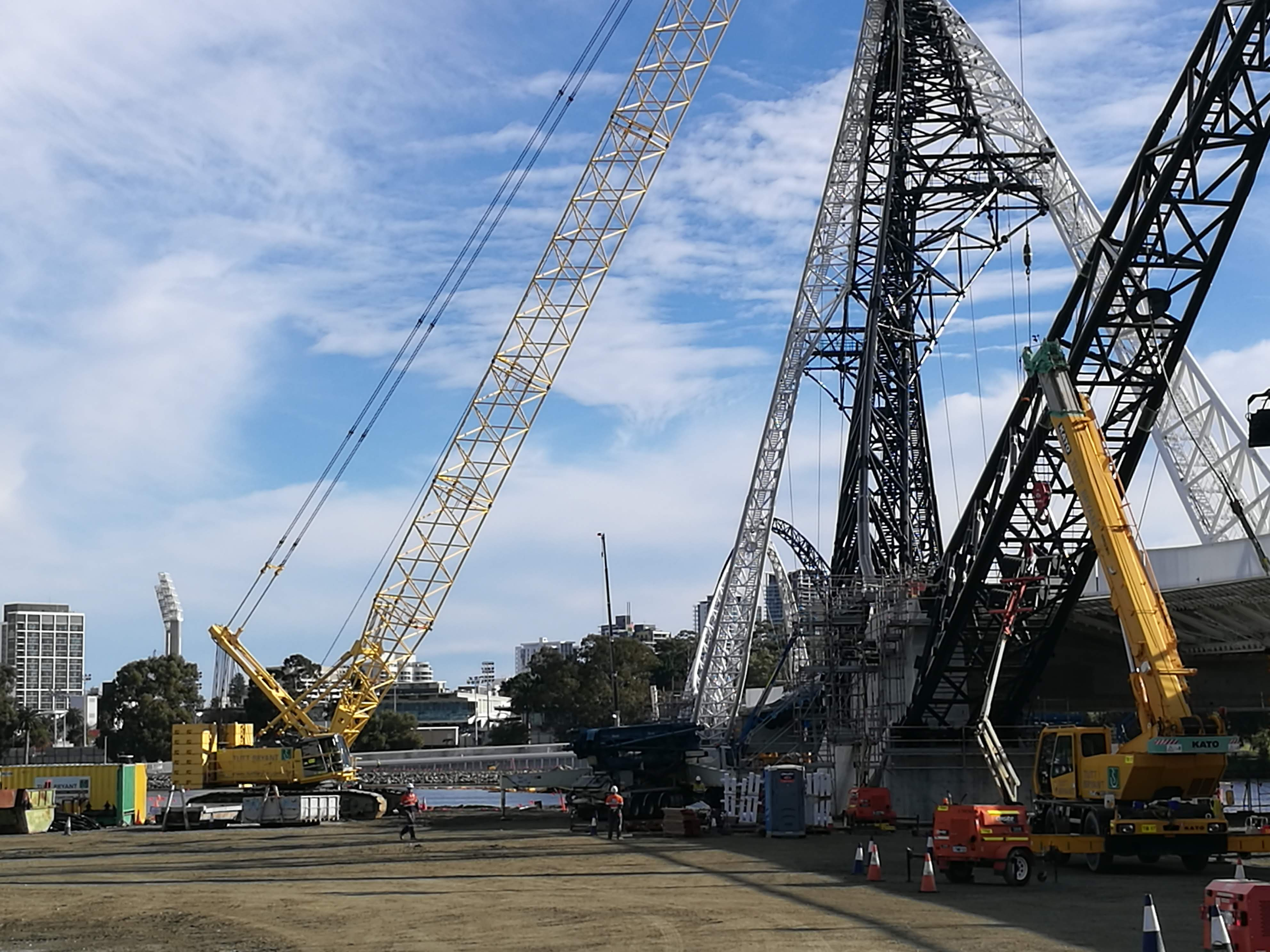
Cranes positioning deck section

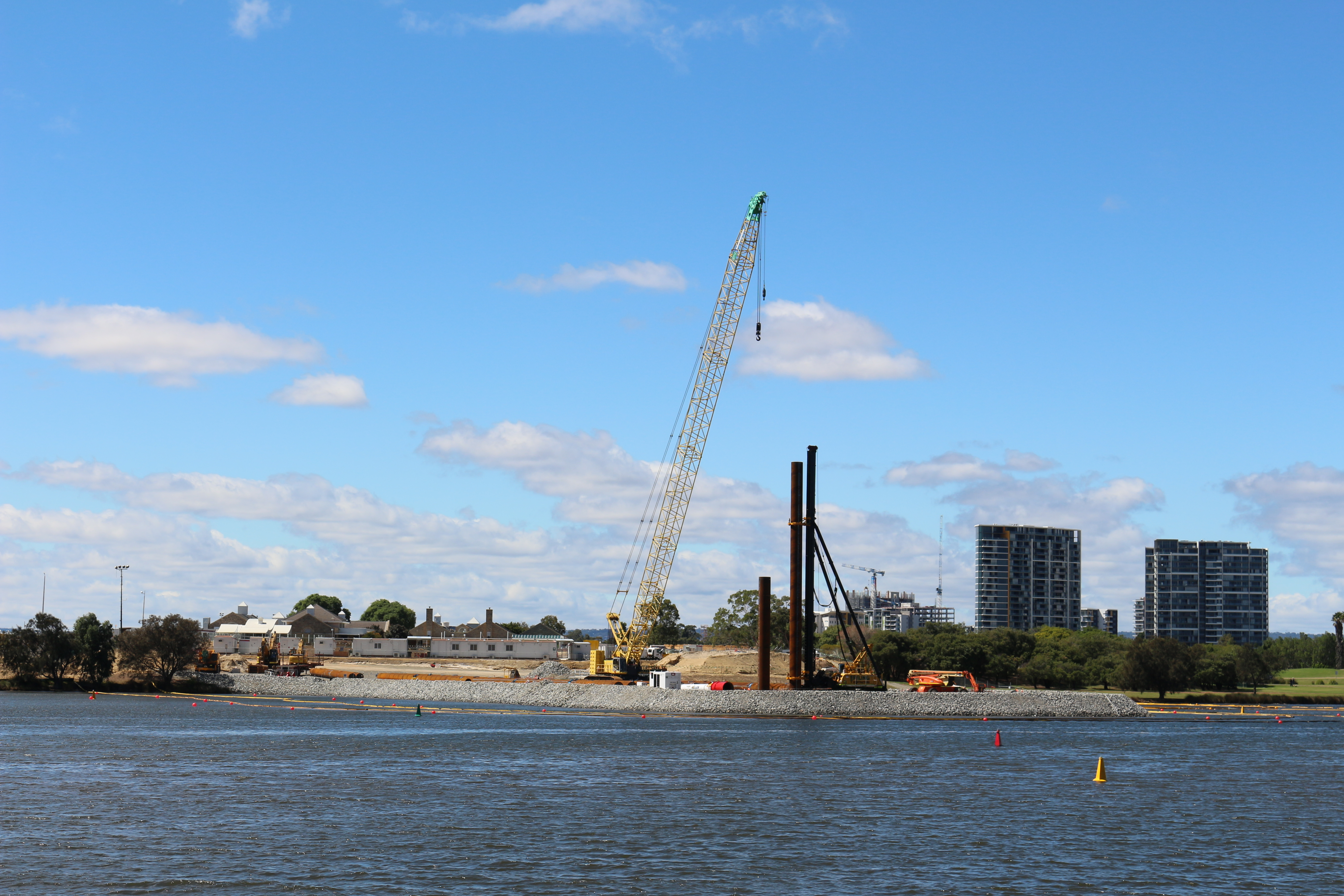
One of two temporary causeways constructed to facilitate construction of the bridge

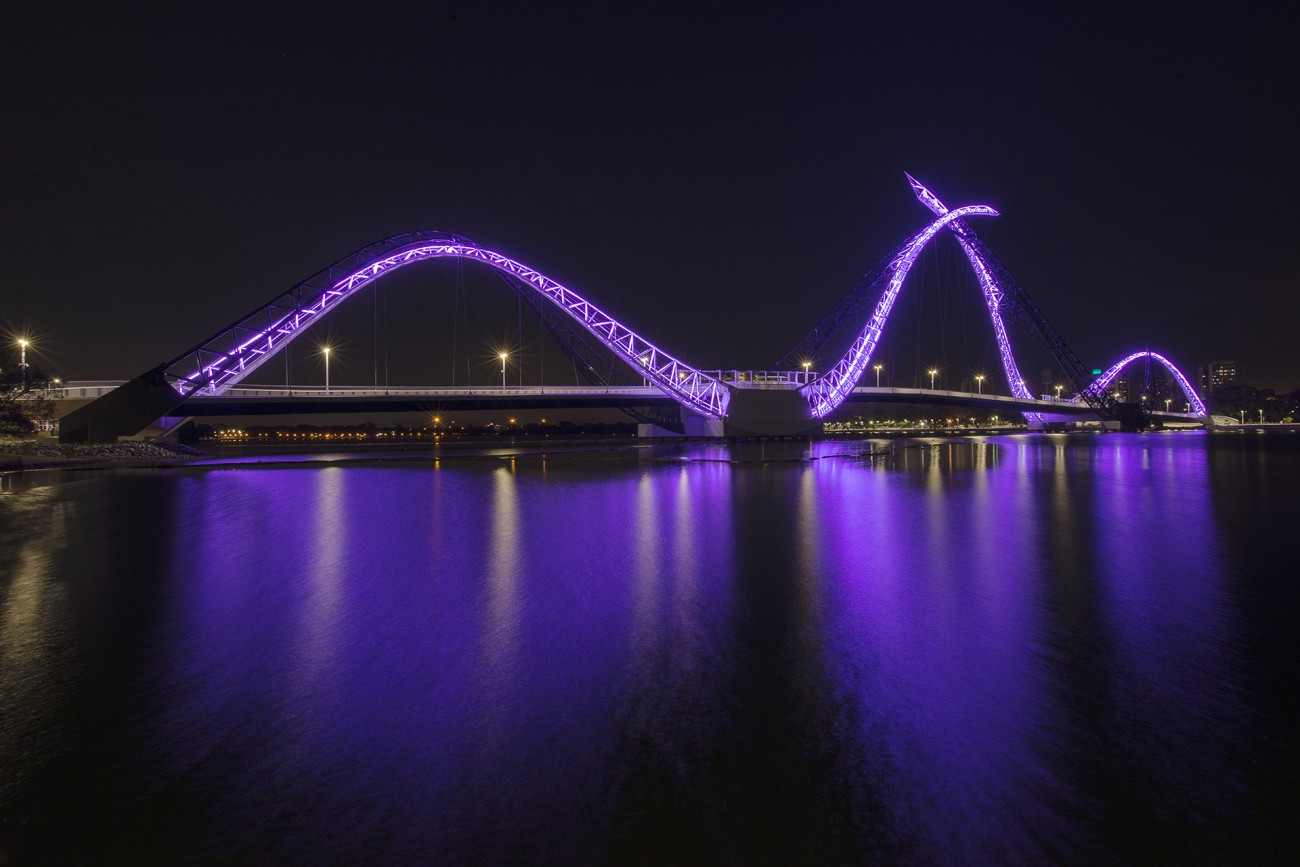
The bridge illuminated in purple for the Queen's Platinum Jubilee in 2022

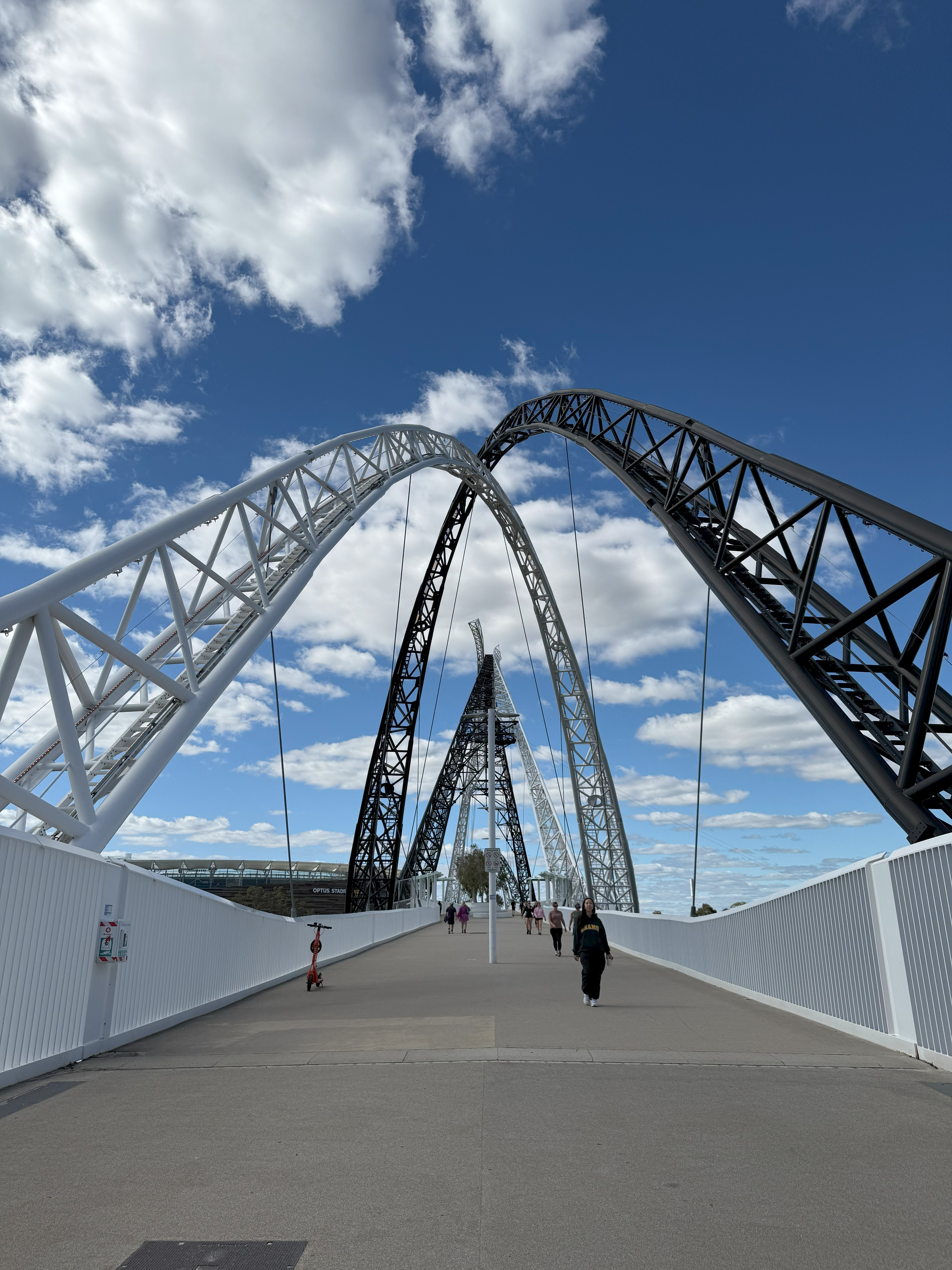
View of bridge from west end of deck

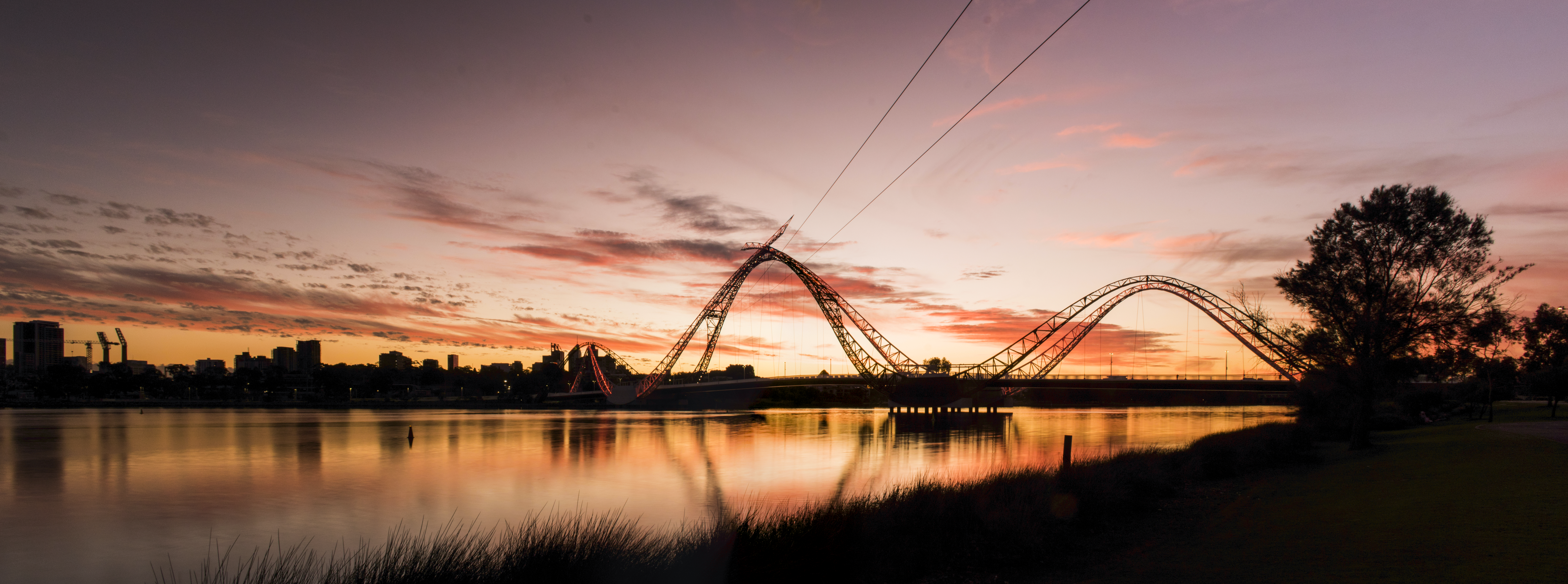
The bridge at sunset

== See also ==
- List of bridges in Perth, Western Australia
