= Bunbury Bridge =

Former railway bridge in East Perth, Western Australia

Coordinates: 31.94794°S 115.88286°E

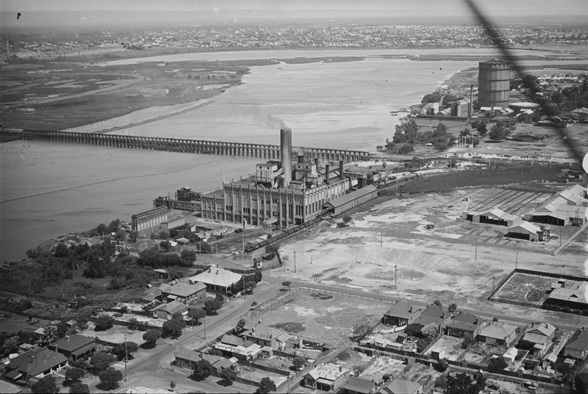
East Perth and surrounds, c. 1935

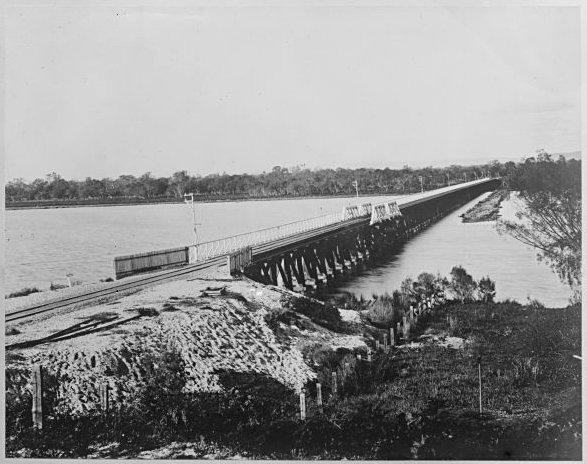
Bunbury Bridge, c. 1930

Bunbury Bridge was a single-track, timber railway bridge in East Perth in Western Australia. The bridge crossed the Swan River near Claise Brook and was built for passenger and freight traffic to Bunbury on the South Western Railway.

Originally called Swan Bridge, it was built in 1892 by Atkins and Law. Construction was delayed due to troubles with sinking the jarrah piles into the soft riverbed: they were intended to be sunk 13 metres (42 ft) below the water level, but reached this depth under their own weight as soon as they were put in position. Ultimately, they had to be driven to 26 to 29 metres (85 to 96 ft) before a solid footing was found.

The bridge was opened as part of the Perth to Bunbury Railway, which was officially opened on 8 September 1893 by Governor Robinson. Following concerns for its safety, a replacement bridge was built, intended as a temporary structure, between 1930 and 1932..

After 63 years of use, that temporary structure was closed when Goongoongup Bridge opened in 1995. The old timber bridge was demolished in early 1996. Windan Bridge, which opened in April 2000, is immediately adjacent and carries road traffic from the Graham Farmer Freeway.

== See also ==
- Australind (train service)
