= Graham Farmer Freeway =

Freeway in Perth, Western Australia

Graham Farmer Freeway Western Australia
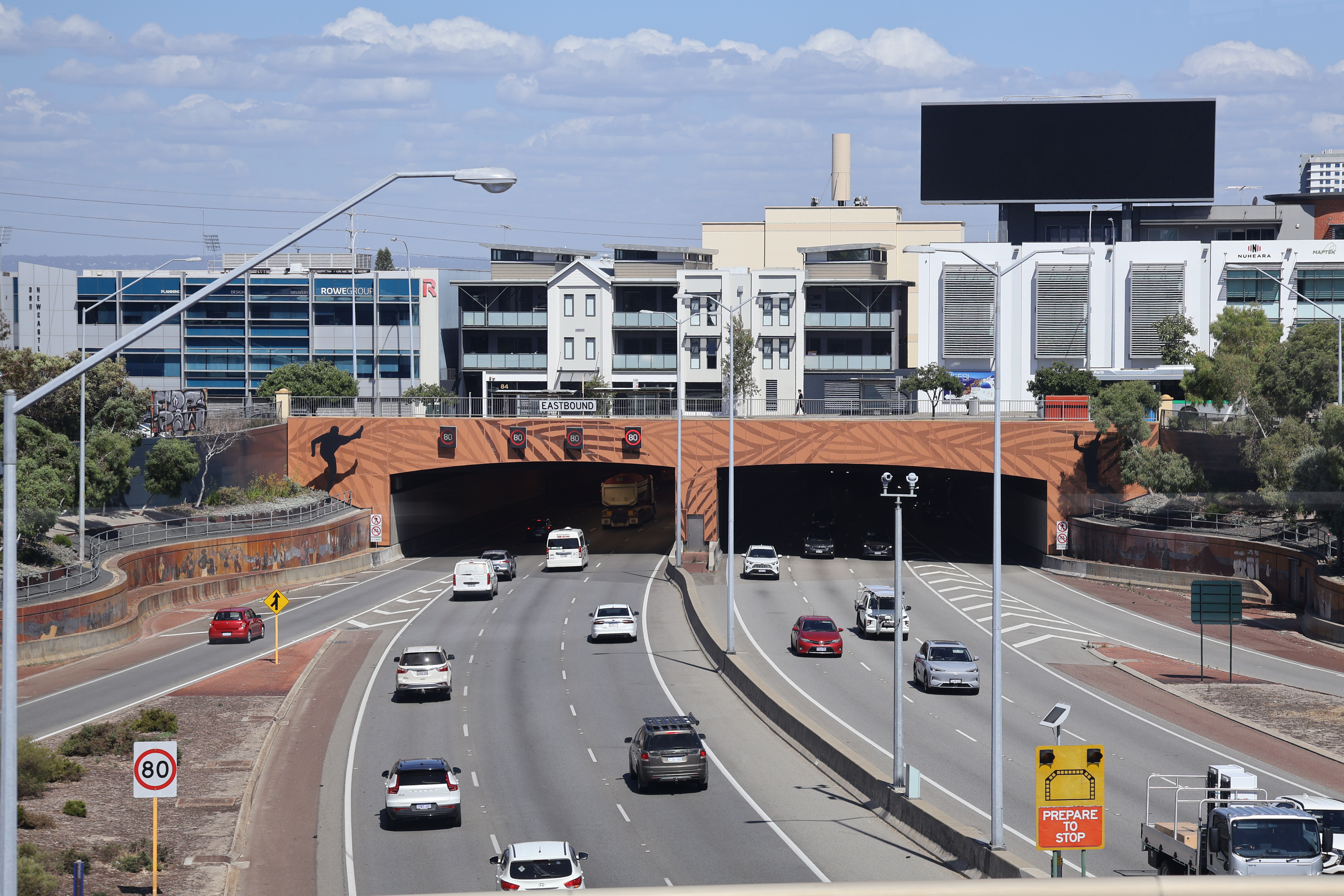
- Western tunnel entrance viewed from the Charles Street bus bridge

General information
- Type: Freeway
- Length: 6.5 km (4.0 mi)
- Opened: 24 April 2000
- Route number(s): State Route 8

Major junctions
- West end: Mitchell Freeway (State Route 2); West Perth
- Loftus Street (State Route 61); Lord Street (State Route 51); East Parade (State Route 66)
- East end: Great Eastern Highway (National Highway 94 / National Route 1); Orrong Road (State Route 8); Burswood / Lathlain / Rivervale

Location(s)
- Major suburbs / towns: West Perth, Northbridge, East Perth, Burswood

Highway system
- Highways in Australia; National Highway • Freeways in Australia; Highways in Western Australia

The Graham Farmer Freeway is a 6.5-kilometre (4.0 mi) inner-city freeway in Perth, Western Australia. It links the Mitchell Freeway in West Perth to Great Eastern Highway and Orrong Road in Burswood, providing an east–west bypass of the city's central business district. Named after Australian rules footballer Polly Farmer, the Graham Farmer Freeway has a 1.6-kilometre (1.0 mi) cut-and-cover tunnel through Northbridge known as the Northbridge Tunnel.

After decades of proposals, the Western Australian state government committed in 1993 to building the City Northern Bypass, as it was known at the time. After trenched and partially tunnelled options were assessed, it was chosen that the bypass would be fully tunnelled through Northbridge. The construction was split into two main contracts. The section from the Mitchell Freeway to East Parade, including the Northbridge Tunnel, was constructed by Baulderstone and Clough. The section from East Parade to Great Eastern Highway, including the Windan Bridge across the Swan River, was constructed by Transfield and Thiess.

The Northbridge Tunnel was constructed top-down, by constructing the ceiling and walls first, then excavating the inside, causing large disruption to Northbridge. Construction on the tunnel started in March 1997 from the western end; breakthrough at the eastern end was achieved in January 1999. The Windan Bridge was constructed between December 1997 and September 1999 using the incremental launch method. The Graham Farmer Freeway opened to traffic on 24 April 2000, resulting in a decrease in traffic on The Causeway and Riverside Drive. In 2013, a third lane was added to the tunnel in each direction by converting the emergency stopping lane to a traffic lane.

== Description ==
=== Route ===
The Graham Farmer Freeway is 6.5 kilometres (4.0 mi) long, and links the Mitchell Freeway in West Perth to Great Eastern Highway and Orrong Road in Burswood, providing an east–west bypass of the Perth central business district (CBD). It is part of State Route 8, along with Orrong Road and Welshpool Road East. The speed limit for the whole freeway is 80 kilometres per hour (50 mph).

The Graham Farmer Freeway commences at the Mitchell Freeway's Hamilton Interchange, which was designed at the time of the Mitchell Freeway's construction to allow for the Graham Farmer Freeway's connection. There is full freeway access to all directions at the interchange, plus on- and off-ramps from the Graham Farmer Freeway to Loftus Street and an off-ramp to James Street. At Fitzgerald Street, the freeway enters the 1.6-kilometre (1.0 mi) Northbridge Tunnel, which travels parallel between Newcastle Street and Aberdeen Street, before s-bending north at Beaufort Street to travel parallel between Newcastle Street and Parry Street. At Lord Street, the Graham Farmer Freeway exits the tunnel.

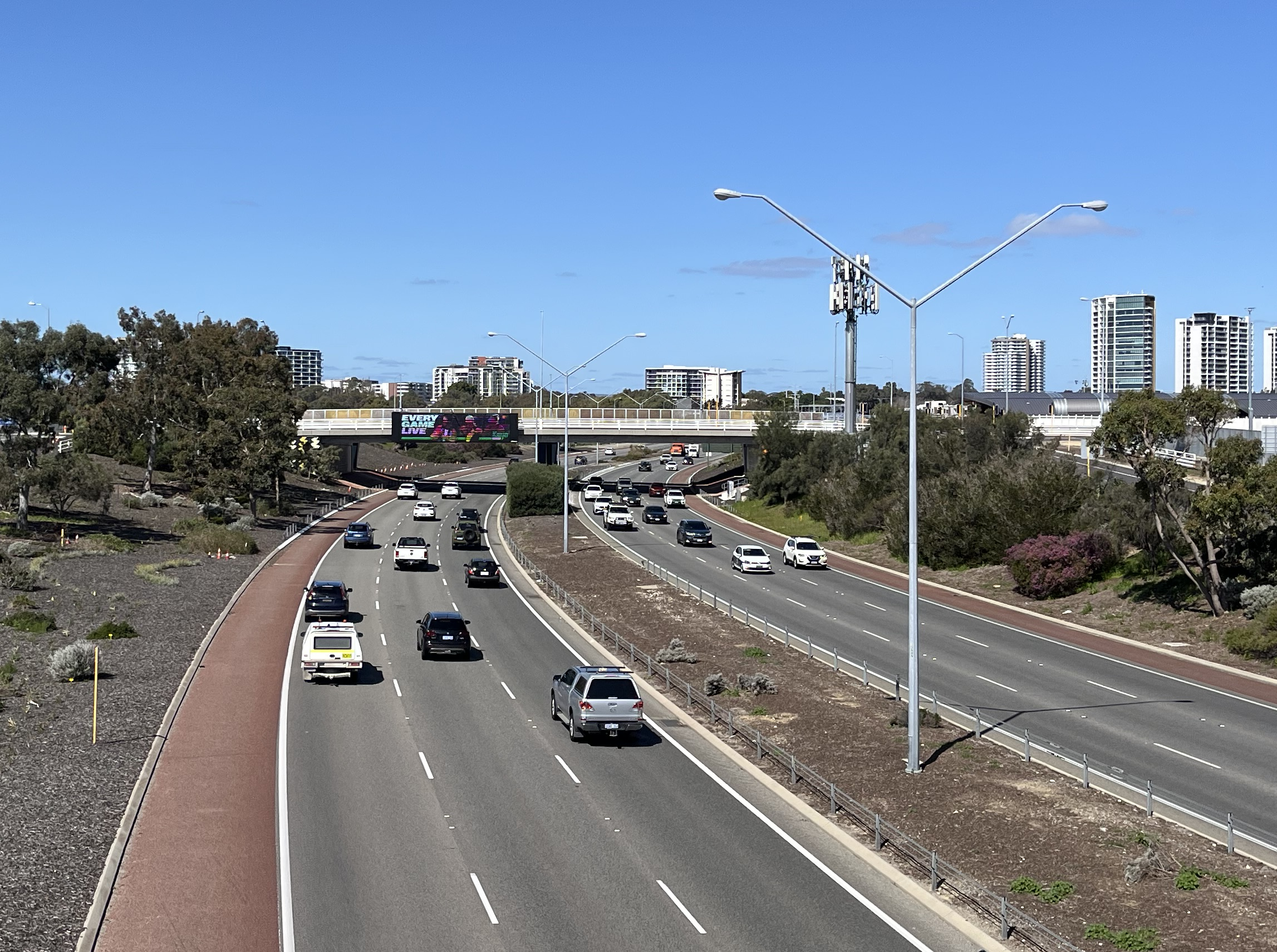
The Graham Farmer Freeway viewed from the Belmont Park footbridge

East of Lord Street, the Graham Farmer Freeway travels parallel to and on the northern side of the railway line, connecting to East Parade at a diamond interchange, through which access is provided to Lord Street as well via collector-distributor lanes. East of East Parade, the freeway crosses the Swan River via the Windan Bridge, which is parallel to the railway's Goongoongup Bridge. In Burswood, the freeway bends towards the south-west, connecting to Victoria Park Drive via a diamond interchange, before diverging from the railway and passing under the Riversdale Road bridge. The freeway terminates at Great Eastern Highway via a modified diamond interchange with an additional loop ramp from the highway westbound to the freeway northbound. South of Great Eastern Highway, the freeway turns into Orrong Road.

=== Tunnel ===
Eastern entrance to the Northbridge Tunnel

The Northbridge Tunnel is monitored by Main Roads Western Australia 24 hours per day from the Road Network Operations Centre (RNOC). The Traffic Operations Centre, located above the eastern tunnel portal, was used until the RNOC opened in 2018. The Northbridge Tunnel is split into two road tunnels for each direction of traffic plus a central escape corridor and service gallery, which can be accessed by emergency doors placed every 60 metres (200 ft). The tunnel is designed to allow for up to three stories to be built above it. The roof of the tunnel ranges from 0.75 metres (2 ft 6 in) to 4 metres (13 ft) below ground level. The interior is 5.1 metres (17 ft) tall, but the clearance is officially 4.9 metres (16 ft). On all five approaches to the tunnel is an infrared beam to check for overheight vehicles, and display a warning sign with flashing lights if an overheight vehicle is detected.

As part of its ventilation system, there are jet fans located throughout the tunnel and a ventilation building near each portal. The tunnel is fitted with traffic monitoring, fire detection equipment and a water deluge system. The tunnel has a 150-year design life. There are lane control lights and electronic overhead signs which can display safety messages. Due to safety concerns, placarded vehicles, which can carry dangerous goods, are not allowed within the tunnel.

=== Artwork ===
There are public art pieces at each tunnel portal. At the western portal is a pictorial history of Northbridge by Joanna Lefroy Capelle, and at the eastern portal is a piece of Indigenous art by Ron Corbett. In 2019, the cement cladding at each tunnel portal was replaced with aluminium cladding, and new artwork was added to the tunnel portals featuring a silhouette of the tunnel's namesake, Graham "Polly" Farmer.

== History ==
=== Planning ===
Proposals for a northern bypass date back to at least 1930, when the Metropolitan Town Planning Commission proposed a route that would have cut across from The Causeway to Newcastle Street. In 1955, the Plan for the Metropolitan Region, Perth and Fremantle, also known as the Stephenson–Hepburn Report, was released. It said that a "Burswood Highway" should be built, which would follow Roe Street and Wittenoom Street, before crossing the Swan River and terminating at Great Eastern Highway. The route of the highway was changed and upgraded to a freeway when the Metropolitan Region Scheme was adopted in 1963 though, with it now running between Newcastle and Aberdeen Streets and forming a ring road with Riverside Drive. The state government commenced acquiring the land for this in the 1960s, with some of the land leased back to private tenants. The cost and political difficulty of building such a road through Northbridge meant that construction did not occur until decades later. Due to a lack of investment in the land, it fell into disrepair.

In 1988, the proposed route within East Perth was moved next to the railway bridge, instead of bisecting East Perth as was previously planned. In the early 1990s, the Department of Planning and Urban Development commissioned the Burswood Bridge and Road Study, to assess the need for the city northern bypass, and determine its alignment and design. At the time, Riverside Drive and The Causeway were heavily congested, with much of the traffic using those roads heading through the CBD rather than to or from the CBD. The study, published in September 1993, recommended the construction of the northern bypass road and a third major river crossing in the East Perth area. The report recommended two options: one as a trench through Northbridge with two short tunnels for A$235 million, and another as a trench through Northbridge with no tunnels for $155 million. The first option would have had tunnels from Stirling Street to west of Beaufort Street, and from Lake Street to Fitzgerald Street; the trench sections would have saved on ventilation costs. By this point, the state government owned over three quarters of the required land for the freeway. A public comments period began thereafter. Public hearings were held in the first half of 1994. The Metropolitan Planning Council (MPC) recommended in mid-1994 that the road's alignment through East Perth be moved south towards the railway line and lowered, saving 48 properties and impacting 13 new properties. The MPC also recommended that the route be fully tunnelled instead of partially, in response to public submissions. The other options divided Northbridge too much and produce too much noise and air pollution. It was ruled the full tunnel's aesthetic, environmental and social benefits would outweigh the increased cost of $300 million. Land acquisition began in October 1994. In April 1995, it was announced that the City Northern Bypass would be constructed for $335 million, funded by a four cents per litre increase in the fuel levy and from the consolidated revenue fund.

=== Construction ===
The construction of the City Northern Bypass, as it was known at the time, was divided into two contracts. The first contract involved the construction of the Northbridge Tunnel, the interchanges with the Mitchell Freeway and Lord Street, and a 250-metre (820 ft) rail tunnel for the Midland line to pass under the freeway. Five consortia expressed interest in this contract; three of them were shortlisted in August 1995: Baulderstone Hornibrook and Clough; the Citypass Consortium, consisting of John Holland, McConnell Dowell and Obayashi Corporation; and Transfield and Thiess. The Baulderstone–Clough Joint Venture was selected in February 1996 and the contract was signed three months later for $203.8 million. The contract included operating and maintaining the tunnel for ten years. Construction on the tunnel began in September 1996. The second contract involved the construction of the bridge across the Swan River, now known as the Windan Bridge, and the freeway between East Parade and Great Eastern Highway / Orrong Road. Four consortia submitted expressions of interest: Baulderstone–Clough Joint Venture; Leighton Contractors; Transfield Thiess Joint Venture; and John Holland. The first three were shortlisted in July 1996. The Transfield Thiess Joint Venture was selected in November 1996 and the contract was signed in March 1997 for $59.4 million.

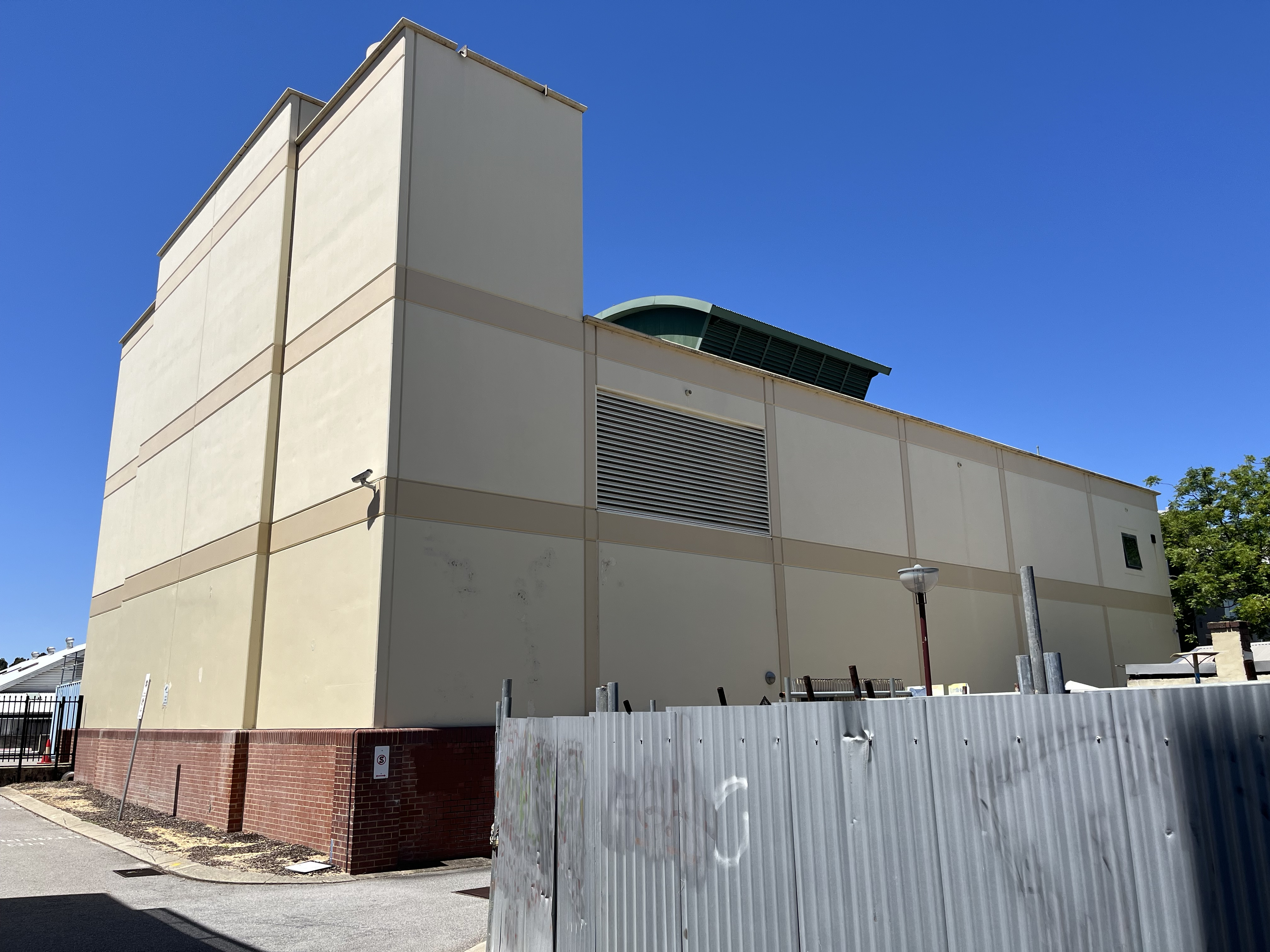
Ventilation building near the western tunnel portal

The City Northern Bypass, particularly the section through Northbridge, was controversial due to the number of buildings that would have to be demolished, the impact of construction on Northbridge, the impact on groundwater and air quality, and its effect in encouraging car use. Prominent critics included federal member for Perth Stephen Smith, state member for Perth Diana Warnock, shadow state transport minister Alannah MacTiernan and Gordon Stephenson, the co-author of the Plan for the Metropolitan Region, Perth and Fremantle. Stephenson said that the road would be predominantly used by traffic accessing the CBD, not bypassing it, and it would encourage driving rather than catching public transport, walking or cycling to the CBD. The Cities for People campaign was by opponents of the freeway, arguing against the freeway and in favour of investment in public transport. The state government rejected criticism of the project; Planning Minister Richard Lewis labelled the opposition to it a "scare campaign" and said that opponents were misrepresenting the project.

By February 1996, Western Australia's Environmental Protection Authority (EPA) ruled out a formal environmental impact assessment for the City Northern Bypass, and that an informal assessment would take place, which came without the requirement for public submissions. This intensified opposition to the project on environmental grounds. Stephen Smith and shadow state environment minister Judy Edwards appealed the decision, citing groundwater flow, noise, and dust. Clough Group's chairman Harold Clough said in February 1996 that a tougher environmental assessment would have helped "silence critics". A freedom of information request by the Cities for People campaign revealed that the EPA spent just three and a half hours assessing the project. However, acting environment minister Kevin Prince stated in April 1996 that the normal development processes would be sufficient to manage environmental issues, and rejected claims that the EPA's decision was rushed. The route predominantly went through backyards, minimising the number of buildings that were demolished. Fifty-eight buildings were demolished, twenty-two of which had local heritage significance. The most significant building demolished was the Lone Star Hotel on the corner of Beaufort and Newcastle streets; several other buildings to be demolished were from the 19th and early 20th centuries. Many buildings only had their architecture assessed, not their history. The Cities for People group said that a formal environmental impact assessment would have examined the historical and social value of the buildings in detail. Demolition started in March 1996.

The tunnel was constructed using a top-down method. The roof and walls were poured first, and then the tunnel was excavated. A total of 580,000 square metres (6,200,000 sq ft) of soil was excavated. The first section of roof to be poured was the western section, at Fitzgerald Street in March 1997. By August 1997, the tunnel construction site had reached 600 metres (2,000 ft) long, with 400 metres (1,300 ft) of walls and 200 metres (660 ft) of roof in place, and less than 100 metres (330 ft) of tunnel excavated. Due to the area's high water table, dewatering was required. During construction, a series of public open days for the Northbridge Tunnel were held, the first of which were in March 1998. As the tunnel passed through Weld Square, two century-old Moreton Bay figs and a kurrajong tree were cut down, and six more century-old trees were relocated, which sparked criticism. The location of the tunnel in the vicinity of the intersection of Newcastle Street and Beaufort Street was changed close to when construction began in that area, locating the tunnel further south, giving local businesses little notice before disruptions began. As it was the most intricate part of the construction process, the intersection was closed in June 1998 and reopened in November 1998. Breakthrough at the eastern end of the tunnel occurred in January 1999.

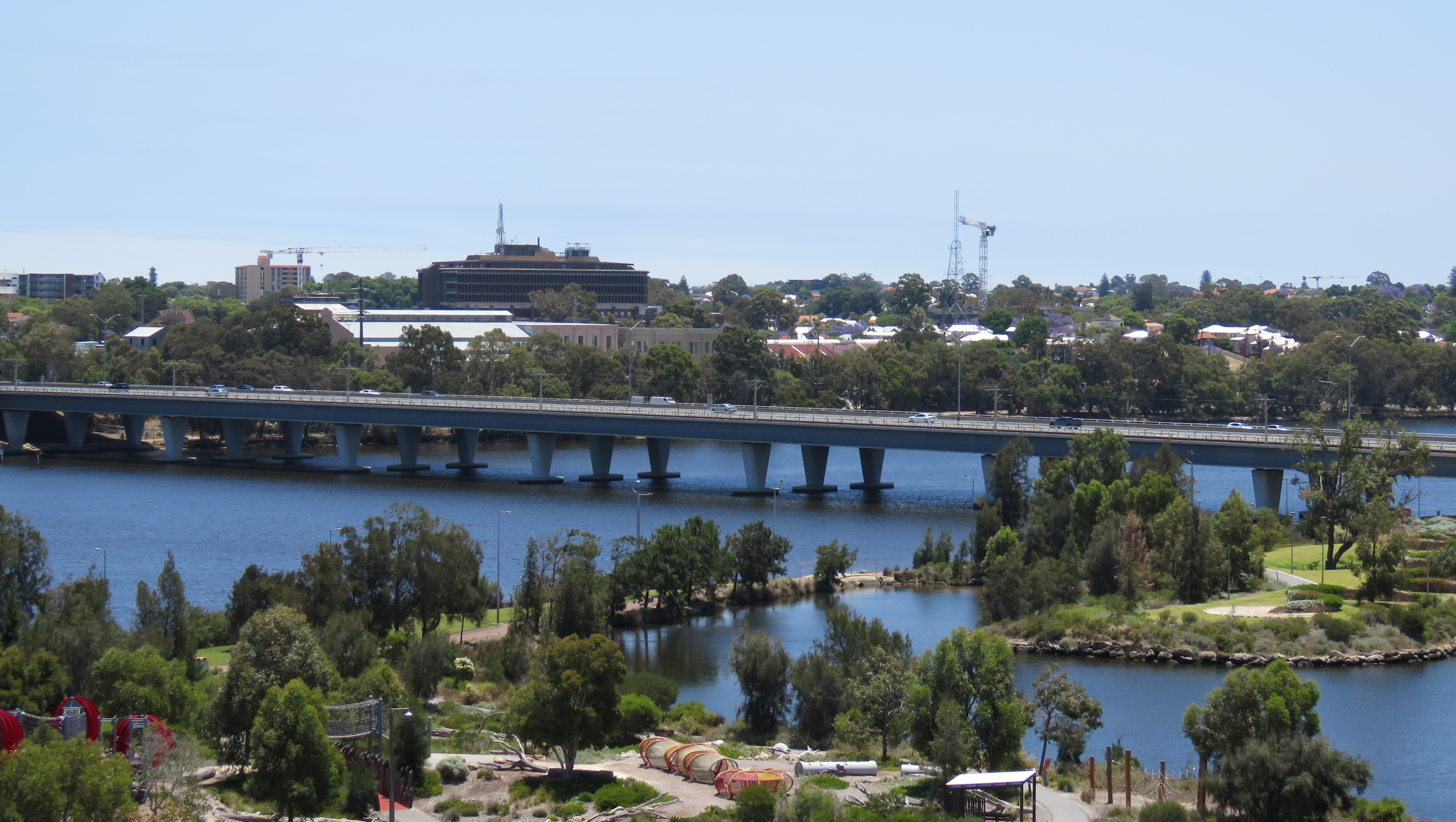
The Windan Bridge and Goongoongup Bridge viewed from Perth Stadium

Earthworks for the bridge across the Swan River began in December 1997. The 403-metre (1,322 ft) bridge was constructed using the incremental launch method. Nineteen launches were made, which took place between September 1998 and September 1999, by which point construction on the freeway was two months ahead of schedule. Ahead of the freeway's opening, the bridge was named the Windan Bridge, after the wife of Yellagonga, the chief of the Mooro tribe of the Whadjuk Noongar people in the 1830s. The bridge is located roughly on the site where Windan was buried.

In October 1997, Transport Minister Eric Charlton announced that the City Northern Bypass would be named after Australian rules footballer Graham "Polly" Farmer, breaking the convention of freeways and highways in Western Australia being named after political figures. Farmer had played for East Perth and West Perth in the West Australian Football League, akin to how the Northbridge Tunnel links West Perth and East Perth. He had also played for Geelong in the Victorian Football League. The tunnel is now colloquially called the "Polly Pipe".

A $72 million budget blowout was revealed in May 1998, taking the budget to $407 million, although Charlton disputed that there was a blowout. This was blamed on material cost escalation, Main Roads overhead that was not accounted for in the original budget, and scope increases such as the interchange at Great Eastern Highway and a video traffic monitoring system. An opening ceremony for the Graham Farmer Freeway took place on 22 April 2000. Premier Richard Court drove Polly Farmer into the tunnel through an Australian football-style banner. As part of the opening celebrations, the public were allowed to walk through the Northbridge Tunnel. The freeway opened to traffic at 2:30 am on 24 April 2000. The final cost was $374 million, after Main Roads overhead is removed.

=== Post-opening ===
The Burswood Bridge and Road Study predicted there would be 80,000 vehicles using the freeway per day by 2021. By October 2000, an average of 65,000 vehicles per day were using the Graham Farmer Freeway, with a peak of 106,000 vehicles on 28 April. Congestion on alternative routes into the CBD had reduced. Traffic on Riverside Drive had dropped from 50,000 vehicles per day before the freeway opened to 27,000 per day, and traffic on The Causeway had dropped from 107,000 vehicles per day to 70,000 per day. Traffic had reduced on Adelaide Terrace, Shepperton Road and the Mitchell Freeway off-ramps to James Street and Charles Street as well. On the other hand, traffic along Whatley Crescent in Maylands had increased by 6,000 vehicles per day. In May 2000, work commenced at The Causeway on converting one lane in each direction to a bus lane.

In February 2011, Main Roads Western Australia confirmed that it was investigating adding a third lane in each direction through the Northbridge Tunnel by converting the emergency stopping lane to a traffic lane. A project to add a third lane was officially confirmed in March 2012. Also included in the project was an additional lane along the Mitchell Freeway for 8 kilometres (5.0 mi) to Hutton Street, the widening of several bridges across the Mitchell Freeway, and the construction of an additional on-ramp from the Loftus Street exit from the tunnel. The project was deemed necessary in part due to the increase in traffic caused by the closure of Riverside Drive for the construction of Elizabeth Quay. The total cost was $57 million.

The lane addition was controversial due to concern about a reduction in safety; in the weeks leading up to construction, the Victorian coroner, Jennifer Coate, released her report into the 2007 Burnley Tunnel crash in Melbourne, which killed three people and was caused by a broken-down truck. The report recommended that new tunnels have emergency lanes, which Premier Colin Barnett disagreed with, saying that the tunnel was built to have three lanes. The third lane in the eastbound tunnel opened on 16 April 2013, and in the westbound tunnel on 29 April 2013. A reduced speed limit was put in place for about a month to allow drivers to get used to the change. By 2014, the rate of crashes in the tunnel was roughly the same as before the extra lanes were added. As of 2026, there are 119,760 vehicles per day through the Northbridge Tunnel, and 106,070 vehicles per day across the Windan Bridge. The higher than expected traffic on the freeway was attributed to higher than expected population growth, and a higher number of vehicles per person.

== Interchanges ==
LGA	Location	km	mi	Destinations	Notes
Perth, Vincent	West Perth	0– 1.0	0.0– 0.62	Mitchell Freeway (State Route 2) – Joondalup, Perth CBD	Full Y-Interchange
Perth, Vincent	West Perth	0.7	0.43	Loftus Street (State Route 61) – West Perth	Eastbound entrance and westbound exit only.
Perth, Vincent	Northbridge	1.0	0.62	James Street – Northbridge	Westbound exit only
Perth, Vincent	Northbridge, Perth	1.0– 2.6	0.62– 1.6	Northbridge Tunnel	
Perth, Vincent	Perth	2.6	1.6	Lord Street (State Route 51) – Perth CBD, Mount Lawley	Eastbound entrance and westbound exit only, via East Parade ramps.
Perth, Vincent	East Perth	3.3	2.1	East Parade (State Route 66) – East Perth, Maylands	
Perth, Vincent, Victoria Park	East Perth, Burswood	3.7– 4.2	2.3– 2.6	Windan Bridge	
Victoria Park	Burswood	4.5– 5.0	2.8– 3.1	Victoria Park Drive westbound / Seabiscuit Drive eastbound – Burswood	
Victoria Park, Belmont	Burswood, Lathlain, Rivervale	6.4	4.0	Great Eastern Highway (National Highway 94 / National Route 1) – Midland, Fremantle, Perth Airport	Continues south-east as Orrong Road (State Route 8); Modified diamond interchange: additional north-westbound looped entrance ramp
1.000 mi = 1.609 km; 1.000 km = 0.621 mi: Incomplete access

== See also ==
- List of tunnels in Australia
