= Neal Jackson =

Neal Jackson may refer to:

- Neal Jackson (Georgia politician), Georgia politician
- Neal Jackson (North Carolina politician), North Carolina politician
- Neal Jackson owner and chef of Jackson's (restaurant)
- Le-Neal Jackson, South African field hockey player
