= Highgate, Western Australia =

Highgate Perth, Western Australia
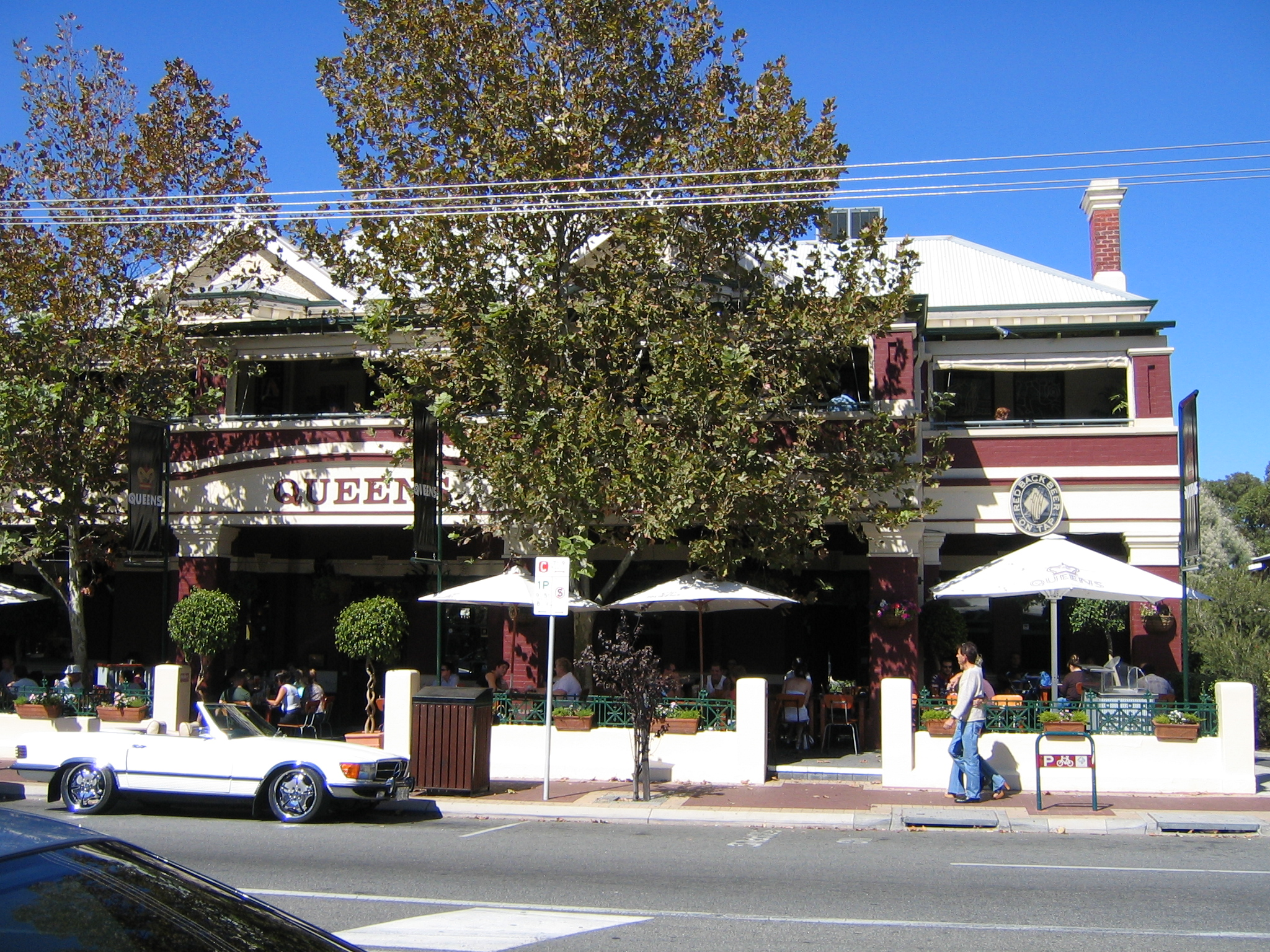
- The Queens Hotel, Highgate
- Coordinates: 31°56′24″S 115°52′08″E
- Population: 2,326 (SAL 2021)
- Postcode(s): 6003
- Area: 0.4 km^{2} (0.2 sq mi)
- Location: 2 km (1 mi) NNE of the Perth CBD
- LGA(s): City of Vincent
- State electorate(s): Perth
- Federal division(s): Perth
Suburbs around Highgate:
North Perth	Mount Lawley	Mount Lawley
Perth	Highgate	Perth
Perth	Perth	Perth

Highgate is an inner metro suburb of Perth, Western Australia, located within the City of Vincent and north of the central business district of Perth. Highgate was named for the village of Highgate, Hawkhurst in Kent, England. Highgate is the smallest suburb in the Perth metropolitan region, with an area of just 0.4 km^{2} (0.2 sq mi).

Among the landmarks of the area is the Lincoln Street Vent, a disused Art Deco sewerage vent, designed by Russell Dumas and completed in 1935, alongside the disused Highgate Hill Police Station (which is also the site of the WAPOL Historical Society's Police Museum). The vent, which proved to be a "white elephant", was secretly used as an antenna base by the Police Wireless Service during World War II.

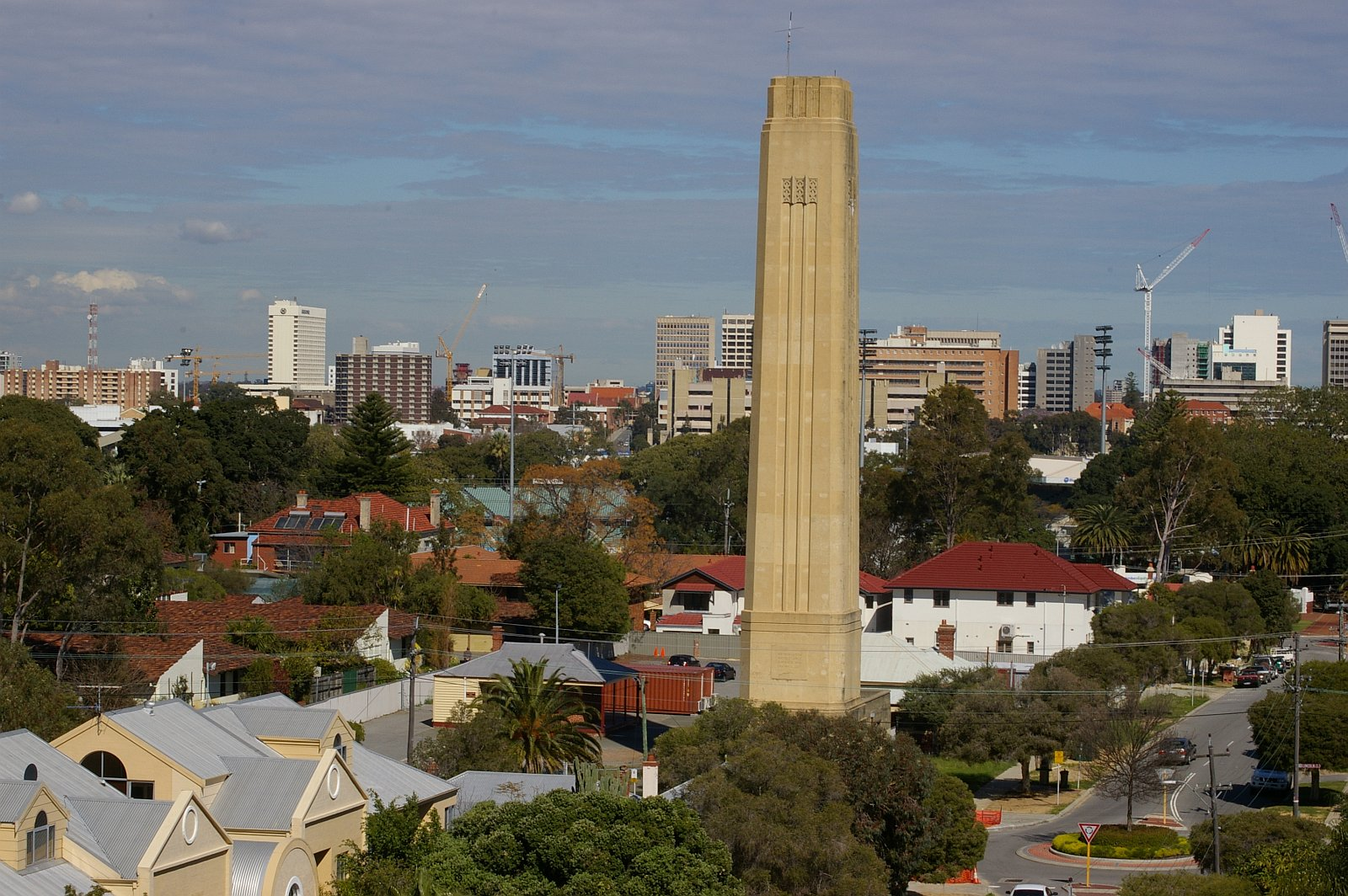
The Lincoln Street Vent in Highgate, taken from the Stirling Towers apartment block.

St Mark's International College, an English as a second language (ESL) school operated between 1989 and 2010, at 375 Stirling Street, on the corner of Harold Street. The St Mark's buildings were constructed from 1936, as a Catholic Christian Brothers boys' high school. This was known as CBHS Highgate until 1978, when it merged with St Mark's in Bedford (previously CBHS Bedford) and received that school's students. The name of the school was changed to St Mark's College Highgate in 1982. St Mark's was closed and sold several years later, when all students were transferred to Chisholm College, in Bedford. St Mark's re-development into an apartment complex was completed in 2013.

The suburb has two primary schools: Sacred Heart (a Catholic school) and Highgate Primary School (the second oldest government primary school in the state). Highgate Primary School has students from over 50 different nationalities and backgrounds. The school also has a highly successful chess team and rock band. Highgate Primary participates actively in local sporting events and teaches the Indonesian language as a special LOTE.

== Transport ==
=== Bus ===
- 40 Elizabeth Quay Bus Station to Galleria Bus Station – serves Lord Street
- 41 Elizabeth Quay Bus Station to Bayswater Station – serves Lord Street
- 42 and 43 Elizabeth Quay Bus Station to Maylands Boat Ramp – serve Lord Street
- 67 and 68 Perth Busport to Mirrabooka Bus Station – serve Beaufort Street
- 950 Queen Elizabeth II Medical Centre to Galleria Bus Station (high frequency) – serves Beaufort Street
- 980 Elizabeth Quay Bus Station to Galleria Bus Station (high frequency) – serves William Street

== See also ==
- Jackson's (restaurant)
