= East Perth Primary School =

Proposed school in East Perth, Australia

- East Perth, Western Australia

Information
- Type: Primary
- Established: 2029 (planned)
- Educational authority: Department of Education

East Perth Primary School is a proposed primary school, in East Perth, Western Australia. Its establishment aims to alleviate overcrowding in nearby public schools. Scheduled to open in 2029, it will be the first public school built in the Perth central business district in over a century.

== History ==
In April 2023, the Government of Western Australia approached the City of Perth to use two-thirds of its Queens Gardens carpark in Nelson Crescent, East Perth for a new primary school. It would be the first public school in the Perth central business district for over 100 years.

Under the Chevron Hilton Hotel Act 1960, enacted in the lead up to the 1962 British Empire and Commonwealth Games, the land next to Queens Gardens and the WACA Ground can only be used for car parking. The government proposed to repeal the act.

Despite initially supporting the plan, the City of Perth withdrew its support, Lord Mayor Basil Zempilas stating it should receive more than the $4.2 million in compensation the government was offering to make up for lost parking revenue. After a year of negotiation, in August 2024 the government announced that it would introduce legislation to compulsorily acquire the land. The school is planned to open in 2029. In March 2026, DevelopmentWA approved plans for the school.
