= Windan Bridge =

Bridge in Perth, Western Australia

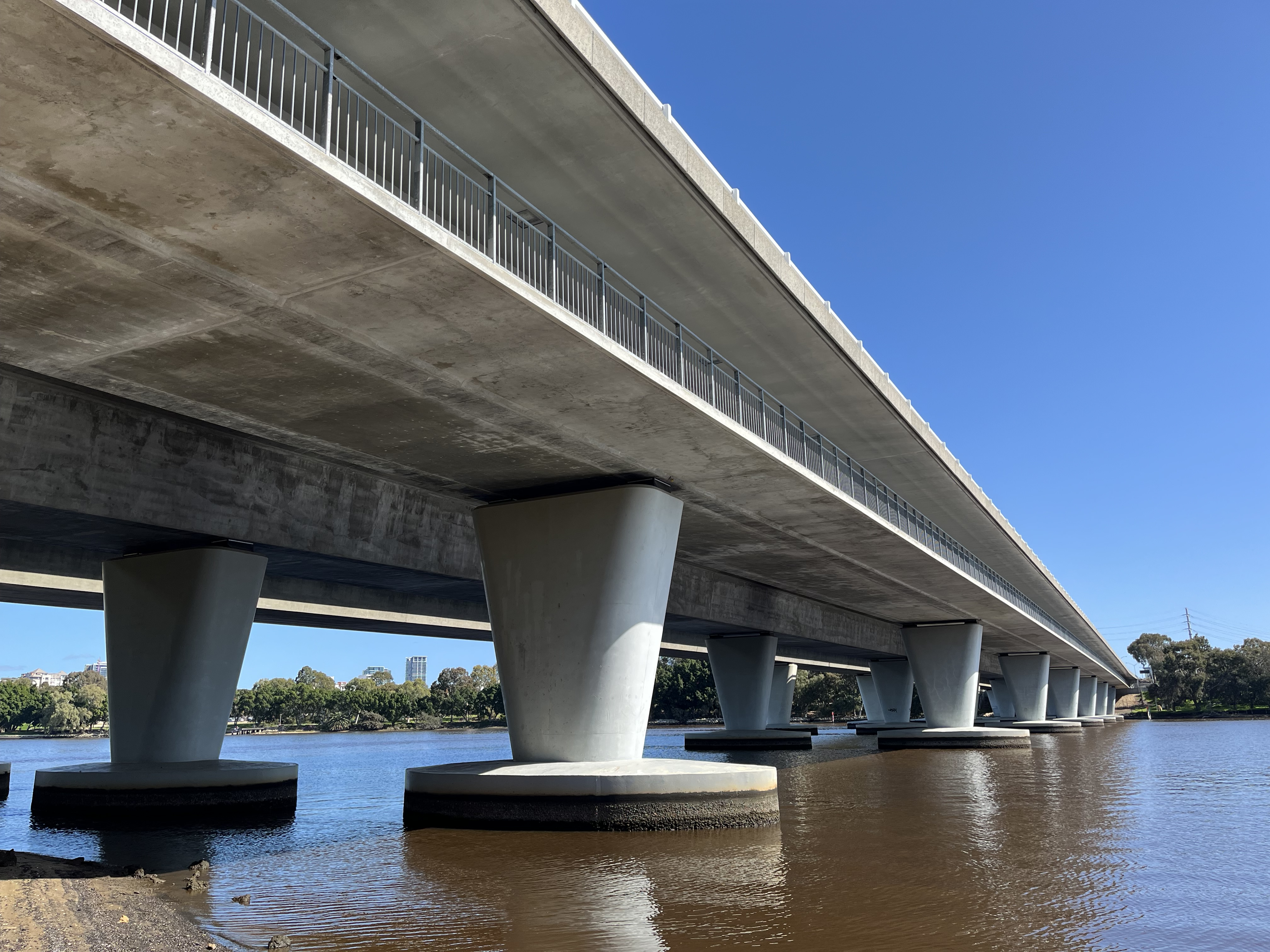
- The Windan Bridge viewed from the Burswood side
- Coordinates: 31.9474°S 115.8828°E
- Carries: Road vehicles
- Crosses: Swan River
- Locale: East Perth, Western Australia

Characteristics
- Total length: 403 m (1,322 ft)
- No. of spans: 9
- No. of lanes: 6

History
- Constructed by: Transfield Thiess joint venture
- Construction start: 1998
- Opened: 22 April 2000

Location
- Interactive map of Windan Bridge

The Windan Bridge is a six-lane road bridge in East Perth, Western Australia which crosses the Swan River and forms part of the Graham Farmer Freeway. Opened in 2000, it sits next to the Goongoongup railway bridge which was built in 1995.

A joint venture between Transfield and Thiess Contractors was selected to construct the bridge from a short-list of three parties. Construction began in 1998. The incrementally-launched bridge is 403 m (1,322 ft) long with nine spans and comprises two prestressed concrete box girders on two rows of piers. A dual-use pedestrian and cycle pathway is located beneath the main deck.

The bridge is named after Windan, a wife of Yellagonga (sometimes spelt Yallgunga), chief of the Mooro tribe. Her body was buried around the area, according to her wish. The name was chosen in consultation with Noongar elders as part of the Graham Farmer Freeway project. A naming ceremony was held on 9 April 2000 where a plaque was unveiled and a traditional Aboriginal smoking ceremony performed.

The opening of the Graham Farmer Freeway and Windan Bridge was celebrated with a community open day on 22 April 2000 where the public could walk or cycle through the Graham Farmer tunnel and across the bridge. The freeway and bridge was open to traffic the following day.

The bridge is part of a popular exercise trail known as the Windan Bridge Loop, which goes along the banks of the Swan River and across the Windan Bridge and The Causeway.

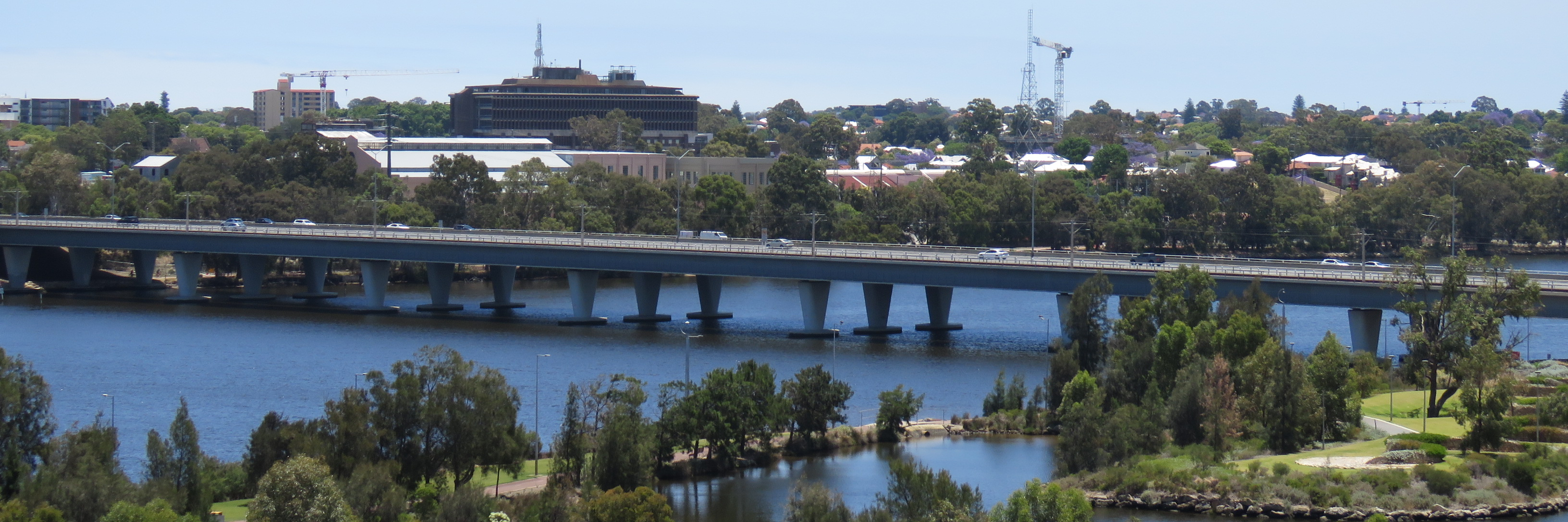
The Goongoonup Bridge and Windan Bridge viewed from Perth Stadium
