= Lincoln Street Ventilation Stack =

Disused sewer vent in Highgate, Western Australia

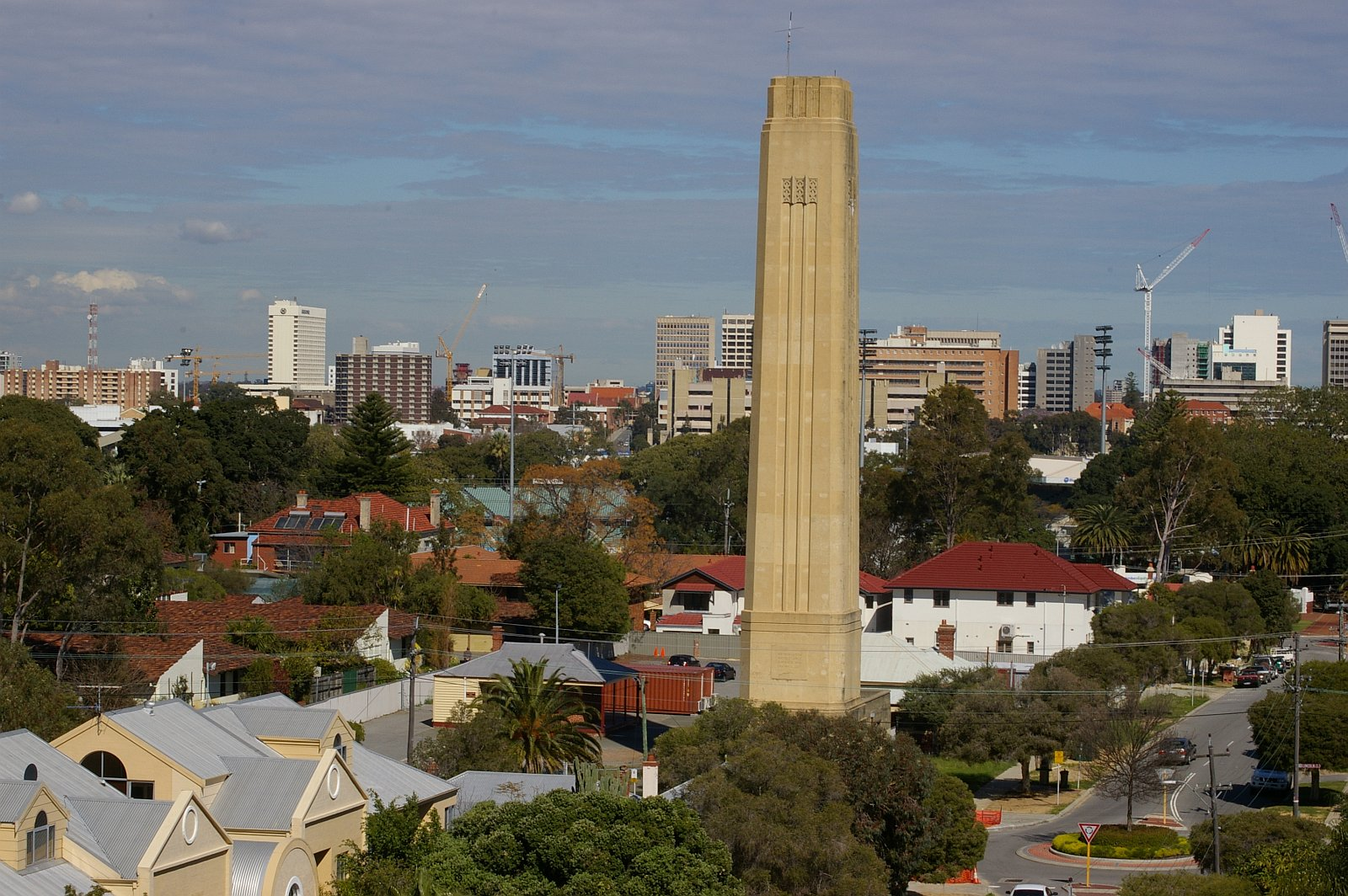
- The Lincoln Street Vent in Highgate, Western Australia
- Interactive map of the Lincoln Street Ventilation Stack area

General information
- Type: Ventilation Stack
- Location: Highgate, Western Australia
- Coordinates: 31.9424°S 115.8708°E

Western Australia Heritage Register
- Type: State Registered Place
- Designated: 18 December 2007
- Reference no.: 3137

Lincoln Street Ventilation Stack is located at 57 Lincoln Street, at its intersection with Smith Street in Highgate, Western Australia.

== History ==
The Lincoln Street Ventilation Stack is a prominent landmark in Highgate, a suburb of Perth, Western Australia. Built by the Metropolitan Water Supply, Sewerage and Drainage Department in 1935 as a sewer vent, it is of brick construction rendered in Art Deco style and stands 38 metres (125 ft) tall, making it the second tallest sewer vent in Australia (after a 40-metre (130 ft) structure in Sydney).

The vent was intended to safely discharge acidic gas with the potential to damage Perth's sewer network and was hence built on top of Highgate Hill above a high point in the system. It proved unsuccessful, inadequately venting the sewer gas and – under certain weather conditions – dispersing what gas it vented over the surrounding houses and police station. It was sealed in 1941 after which it was referred to as "Dumas's Folly", after Chief Engineer of the Public Works Department, Russell Dumas.

A similar vent was planned for the suburb of Subiaco, but was never constructed.

In 1941 the Police Wireless Service moved to the adjacent Highgate Police Station, and the vent tower was put into service as a radio antenna. The move and the tower's new function were kept secret – initially to protect against Japanese air raids during World War II – and weren't revealed until 1956. The vent continued in this role until 1975 and several antennas are still visible on top of the structure.

The Lincoln Street Vent is listed with the National Trust of Australia and the State Register of Heritage Places.

== General references ==
- ALP press release
- HCWA assessment
