= The Loose Box =

Restaurant in Mundaring, Western Australia

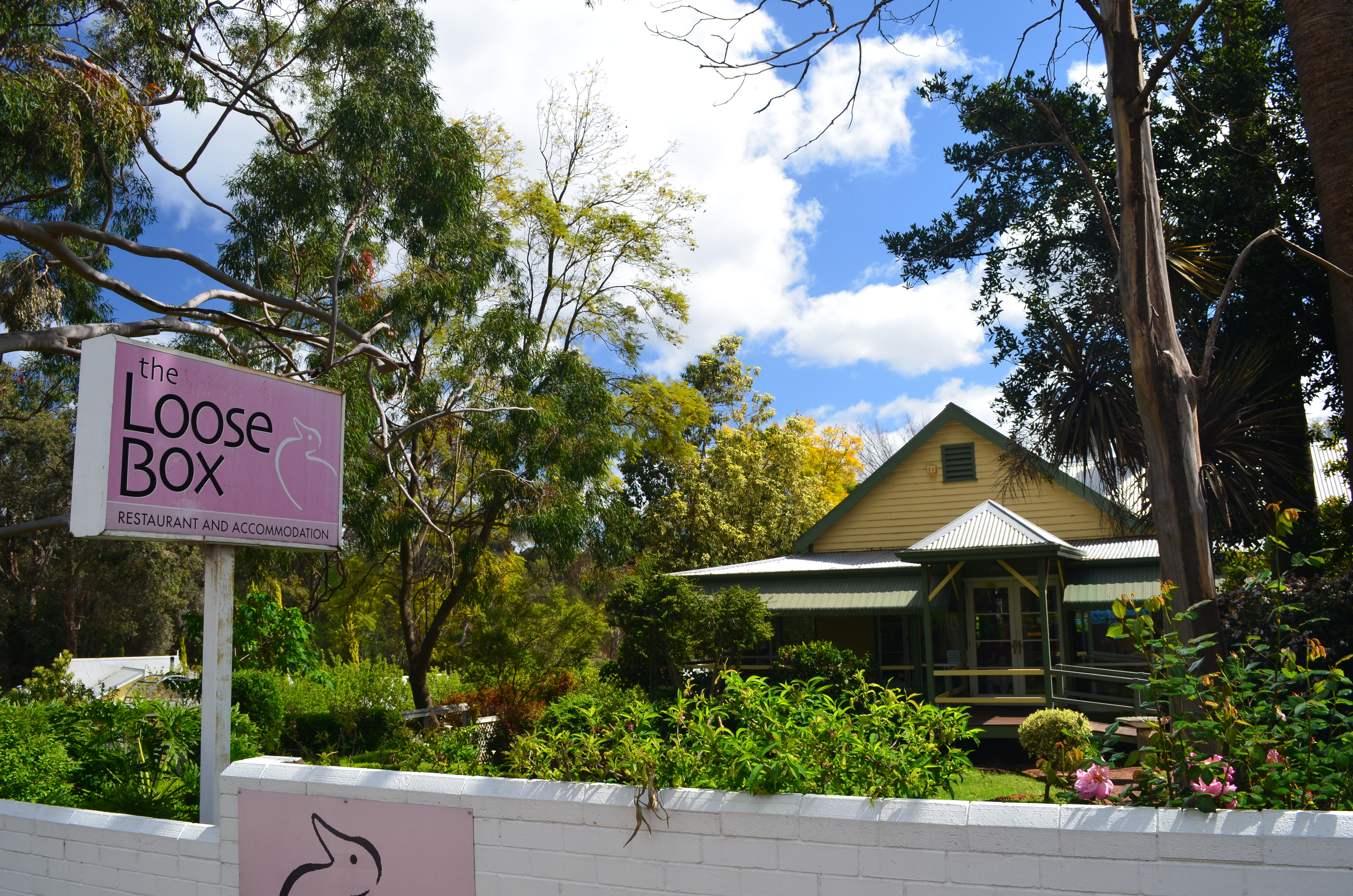
- View of the restaurant building, 2013.
- Interactive map of The Loose Box

Restaurant information
- Established: 1979
- Closed: July 2013
- Chef: Alain Fabrègues
- Food type: Classical French
- Rating: (The West Australian; Good Food Guide 2013)
- Location: 6825 Great Eastern Highway, Mundaring, Western Australia, 6073, Australia
- Coordinates: 31°54′5″S 116°9′45″E
- Website: The Loose Box

The Loose Box was a restaurant in Mundaring, an outer eastern suburb of Perth, Western Australia. During its 34-year existence, it won many awards for its classical French cuisine and service, and had a big impact on the hospitality industry in Perth.

At the time of its closure, the restaurant held a two star rating by The West Australian Good Food Guide 2013. Alongside it was a complex of six cottages providing bed and breakfast accommodation to diners who wanted to stay the night.

== See also ==
- French cuisine
- Western Australian wine
- Perth Hills
