= Russell Dumas =

Australian public servant and engineer

Sir Russell John Dumas
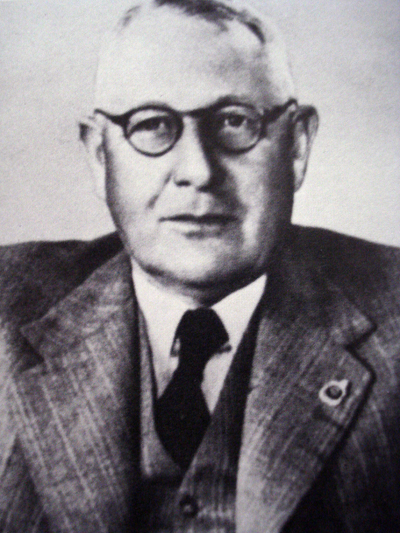
- Born: 17 January 1887; Mount Barker, South Australia
- Died: 10 August 1975 (aged 88); Albany, Western Australia
- Education: University of Adelaide
- Engineering career
- Discipline: Civil engineering
- Projects: Canning Dam, Harvey Weir, Wellington Dam
- Awards: Peter Nicol Russell Award (1952); KBE (1964)

Sir Russell John Dumas KBE, CMG (17 January 1887 – 10 August 1975) was a public servant and engineer who led several large works projects in Western Australia.

== Early life ==
Dumas was born in Mount Barker, South Australia second of five children of Charles M. R. Dumas (1851–1935), who founded the Mount Barker Courier newspaper. Dumas attended Prince Alfred College and completed a Bachelor of Engineering at the University of Adelaide.

== Career ==
Dumas started work as a draughtsman in the Engineer-in-Chief's Department in 1910, then became a drainage-works designer at Naracoorte. Dumas enlisted in the Australian Imperial Force in 1916, and served on the Western Front in France from 1917 to 1918. He became lieutenant and was wounded twice; his service ended on 16 November 1919.

Dumas returned to his job at Naracoorte, and was promoted to resident engineer in 1923. In 1925, Dumas and his family moved to Western Australia where he joined the Metropolitan Water Supply, Sewerage and Drainage Department. There he directed the construction of the Churchman Brook Dam, Drakesbrook/Waroona and Wellington dams; the raising of Harvey weir; and the extension of the irrigation areas in Collie and Harvey.

In 1932, he was chair of the Institution of Engineers' Perth division. In 1934, Dumas became chief engineer at the Metropolitan Water Supply, Sewerage and Drainage Department and led the design and construction of the Canning, Samson Brook and Stirling dams. At 45 metres tall, Stirling Dam was Australia's highest earthen dam.

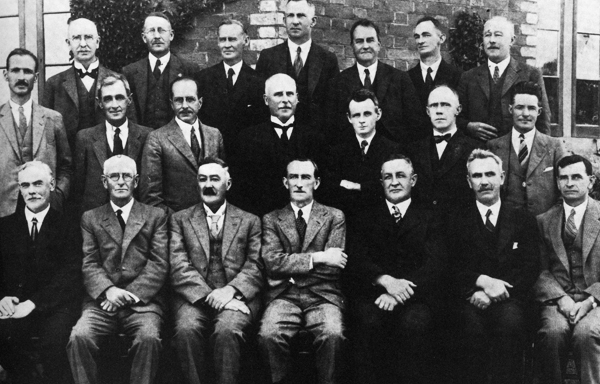
Senior Officers of Public Works and Metropolitan Water Supply. Dumas is second from left in back row.

Dumas became the head of engineering at the Public Works Department in 1941. He proposed a water supply scheme for the Wheatbelt region that involved raising Mundaring Weir and Wellington Dam. Dumas negotiated with the Federal government and obtained funding for the project. He was also involved in the Ord River Scheme from early on.

Dumas was responsible for extensive land development in the district governed by the Albany Zone Development Committee, and negotiated the establishment of an oil refinery, steel rolling mill and cement works at Kwinana. In 1952 he reached normal retirement age, but as the Kwinana development was still being completed, the Government employed Dumas with additional power and status to oversee the completion of the project. Dumas retired in December 1953.

After retirement, Dumas joined the Weld Club, became director of several companies and was an advisor to Sir Charles Court. In the 1960s, Dumas took part in the campaign to save The Barracks Arch, the former home of the Public Works Department, from demolition.

Dumas died on 10 August 1975 in Albany, Western Australia.

== Honours ==
- Companion of the Most Distinguished Order of St Michael and St George, 1950.
- Knight Bachelor, 1959.
- Knight Commander of the Most Excellent Order of the British Empire, 1964.
- Honorary Member of the Institution of Engineers, Australia, 1966.

== Legacy ==
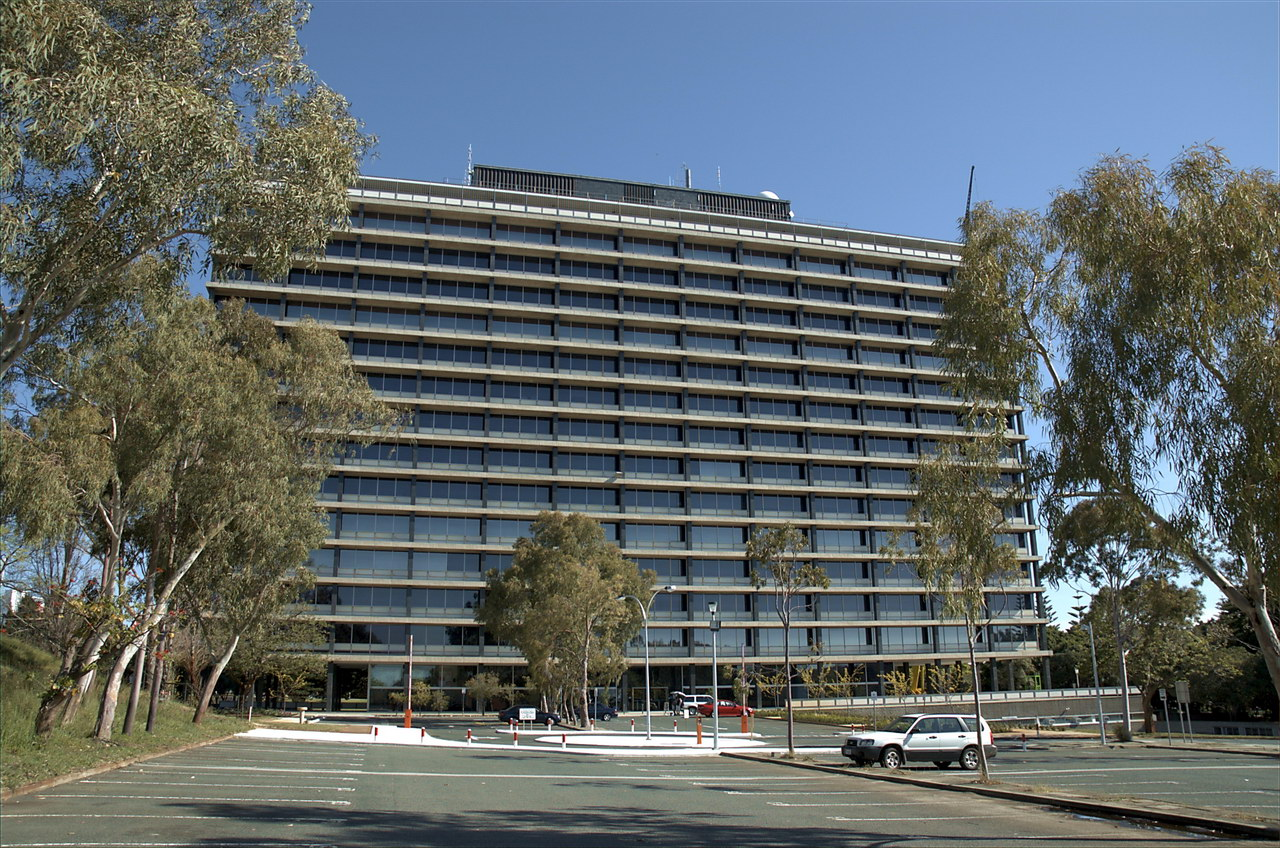
Dumas House.

- The Russell Dumas Medal is awarded to the top engineering student each year at the University of Western Australia.
- Dumas House, a State government office building, is named in his honour.
- A bronze plaque with Dumas's name was laid in the footpath of St Georges Terrace, Perth as part of the WAY 1979 celebrations to commemorate 150 notable figures in Western Australia's history.
- Lincoln Street Ventilation Stack, also known as Dumas's Folly, is an obelisk or plinth-like structure in Perth. And while it was not useful for its intended purpose it was repurposed as a radio-frequency antenna during WWII.

== See also ==
- French Australian
