= Jackson's (restaurant) =

Former restaurant in Perth, Western Australia

- Interactive map of Jackson's

Restaurant information
- Established: July 1998
- Closed: 2014
- Chef: Neal Jackson
- Food type: Modern Australian
- Rating: (The West Australian; Good Food Guide 2014)
- Location: 483 Beaufort Street, Highgate, Western Australia, 6003, Australia
- Coordinates: 31°56′20″S 115°52′9″E

Jackson's was a restaurant in Highgate, an inner suburb of Perth, Western Australia. It was established in July 1998 and closed in 2014. For much of its existence, it was Perth's number one "special night out" destination. It won many awards, and was described by The New York Times as "... perhaps the town's top table, with a formidable selection of Australian wines ...".

The restaurant's owner and chef, English-born Neal Jackson, served his apprenticeship at the Savoy Hotel in London, and later worked elsewhere in that city. He emigrated to Australia in 1971, and initially held various positions in restaurants around Western Australia. In 1981, he opened his first restaurant, the Anchor and Hope Inn at Donnybrook, and he was later the proprietor of Louisa's, a Bunbury restaurant "... that brought him a legion of fans, many of whom would drive from Perth to eat his dishes ...". He opened his eponymous restaurant in Perth in 1998.

Signature dishes of Jackson's included rack of Amelia Park lamb with confit lamb belly and shank shepherds pie, and Turkish delight souffle with rose petal ice cream.

Jackson's was the restaurant that introduced degustation menus to Western Australia. Prior to the end of August 2013, Jackson's degustation menu, nicknamed "The Dego", was a major feature of its offerings. Jackson's also had an a la carte menu, which included vegetarian dishes. Additionally, Jackson's was renowned for its wine list; its sommelier, Kjell-Ove Almeland, was named Sommelier of the Year at the Australian Gourmet Traveller Restaurant Awards in 2009.

Jackson's was given a two star rating, and the award for Restaurant of the Year, by The West Australian Good Food Guide 2011, and retained its two star rating for 2012, 2013, and 2014.

On 26 November 2013, Neal Jackson announced that he would be retiring after a 48-year career. He was expecting to sell Jackson's restaurant some time in the first half of 2014, but also intended to pursue some other opportunities. In commenting on the changes he had observed since arriving in Western Australia 42 years earlier, he said that produce had greatly improved, but that the biggest change had been in the public's awareness of food. After receiving protests from customers about the cessation of the restaurant's degustation menu, he also said that he intended to reintroduce it for the final few months before his retirement.

In July 2014, a new restaurant, St. Michael 6003, was opened on the former Jackson's site.

== See also ==
- Australian cuisine
- Western Australian wine
