= Goongoongup Bridge =

Railway bridge in Perth, Western Australia

Coordinates: 31.9477°S 115.8829°E

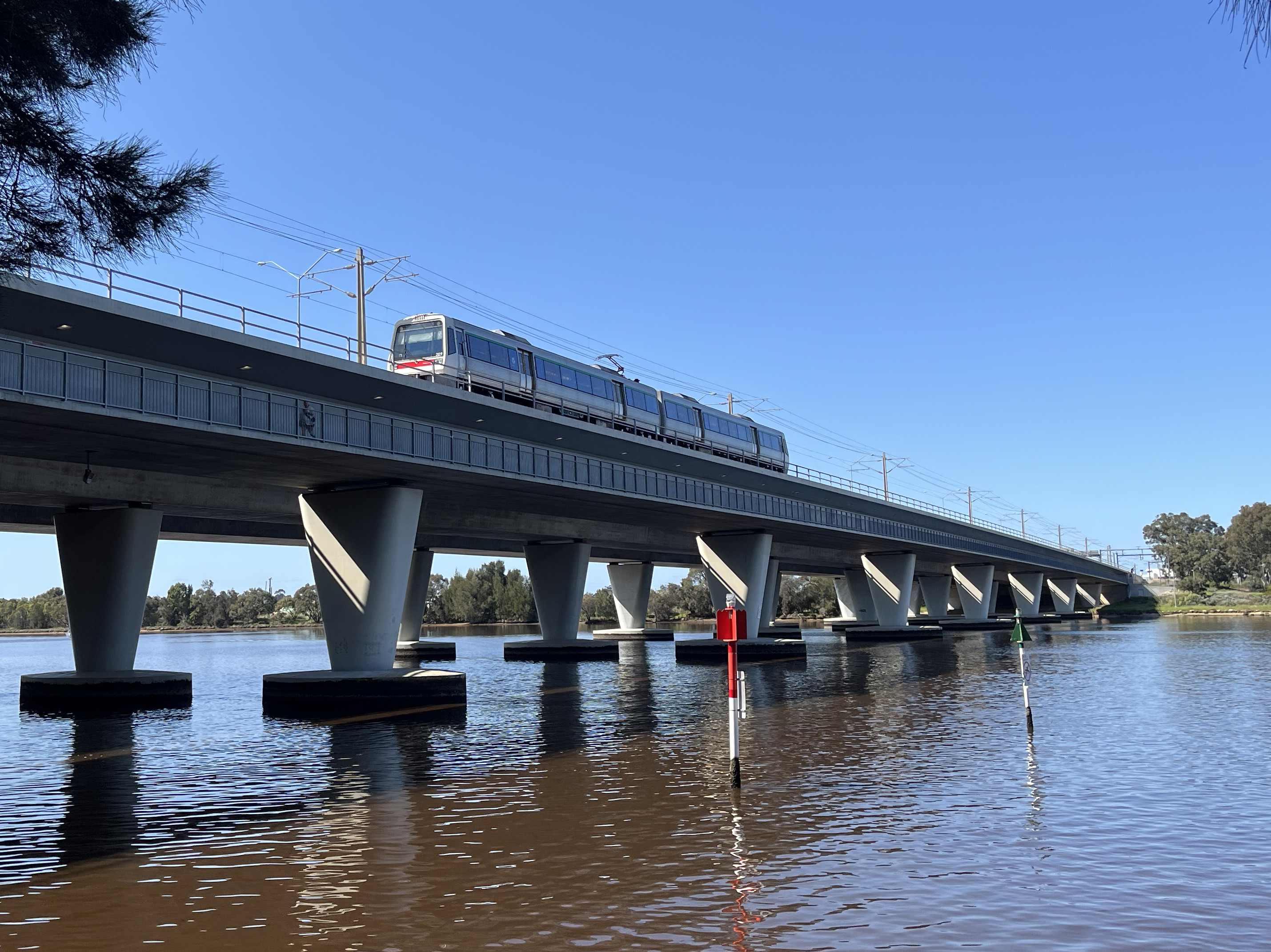
The Goongoonup Bridge, with an A-series train crossing

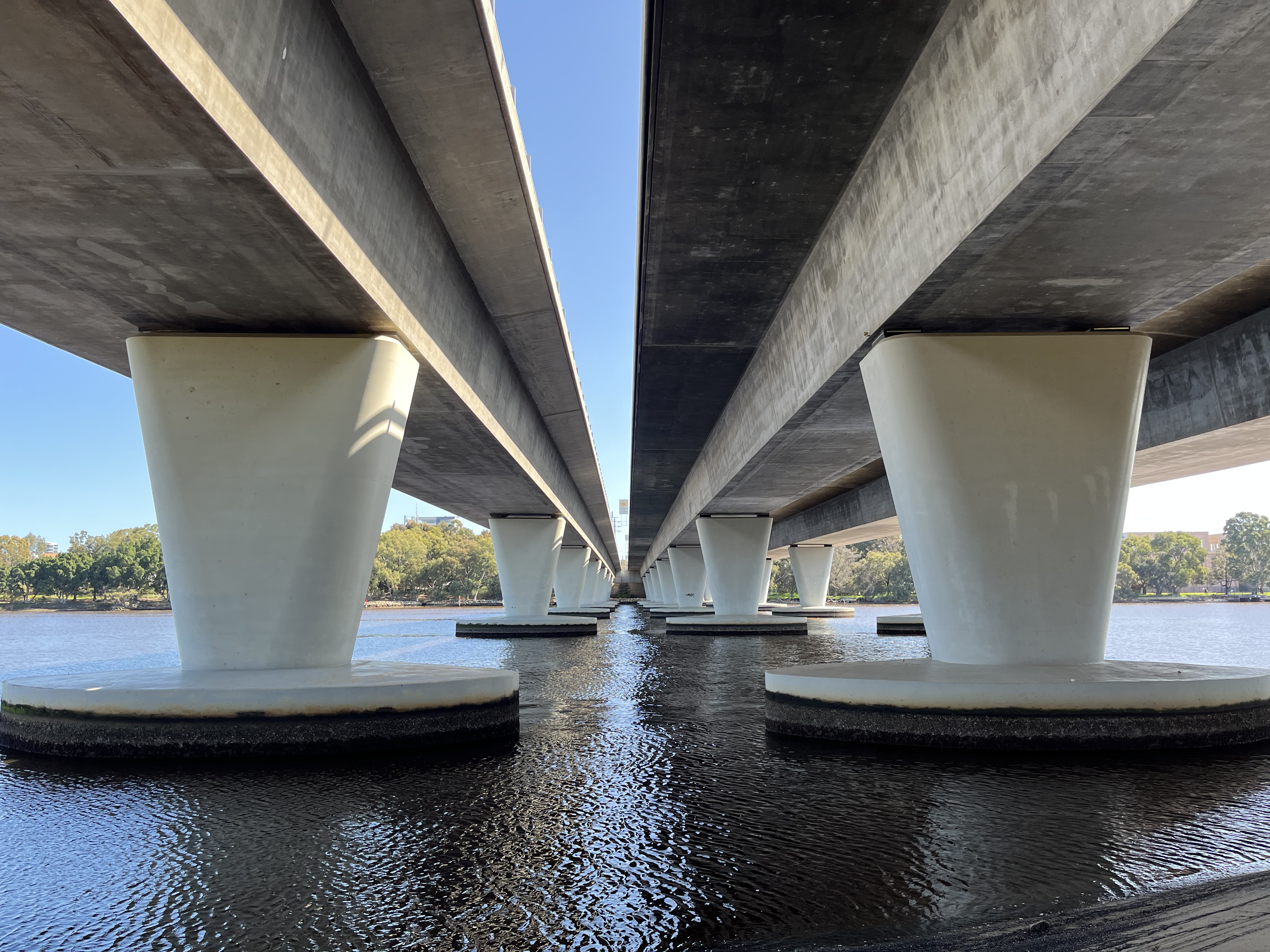
The Goongoonup Bridge on the left and the Windan Bridge on the right

The Goongoongup Bridge is a railway bridge in East Perth, Western Australia, which crosses the Swan River and forms part of the Armadale line. It opened on 24 July 1995 as part of the electrification of Perth's suburban railway network. The name is derived from the Nyungar word for the Claisebrook area.

The Goongoongup Bridge replaced the 1932 built timber Bunbury Bridge which was demolished in 1996. It had replaced the original 1893 structure that was damaged by floods.

The double-track concrete bridge is 407 metres (1,335 ft) long and is supported by eight piers. A dual-use pedestrian and cycle pathway is beneath the main deck.

A six-lane road bridge Windan Bridge opened in 2000 and is situated parallel and 2 metres (6 ft 7 in) upstream from Goongoongup Bridge.

== Repairs ==
In 2002, movement of soil on the eastern end of the bridge was detected. Displacement of 140 mm (5.5 in) on the abutments was measured and engineering reports predicted the displacement would be 300 mm (12 in) by the end of the century and that the abutment piles would yield in 10 to 20 years.

Repair work by the Public Transport Authority commenced in August 2011 and was completed in early 2013.

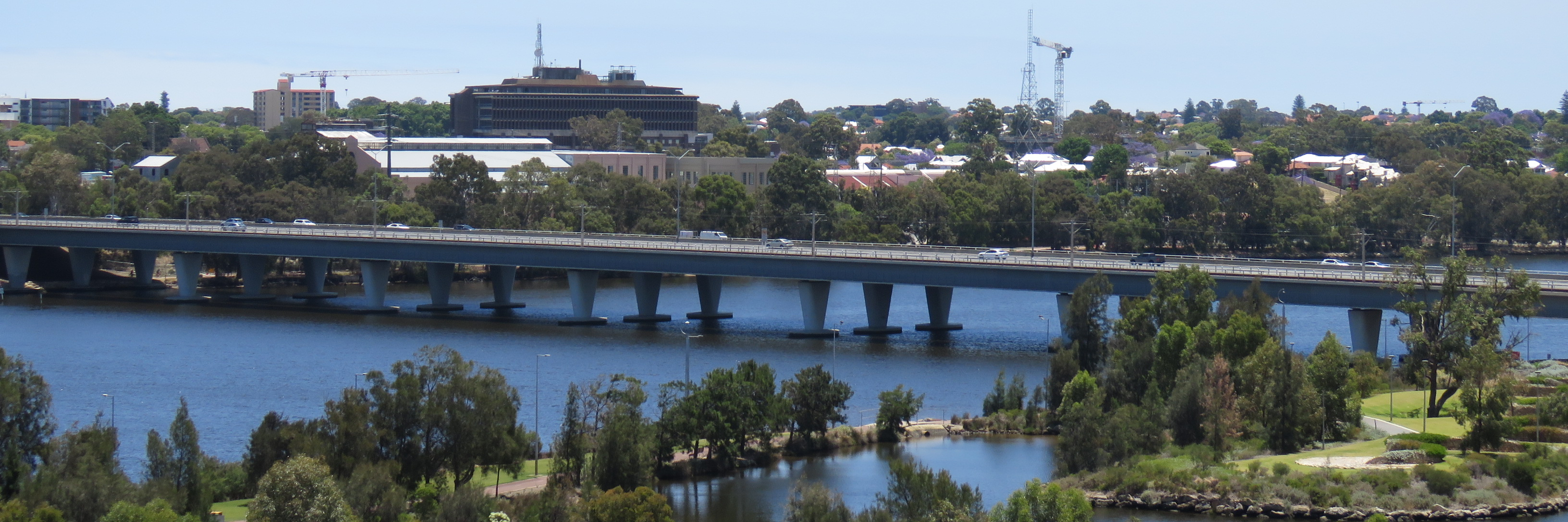
The Goongoonup Bridge and Windan Bridge viewed from Perth Stadium
