= East Perth, Western Australia =

East Perth
- Suburb
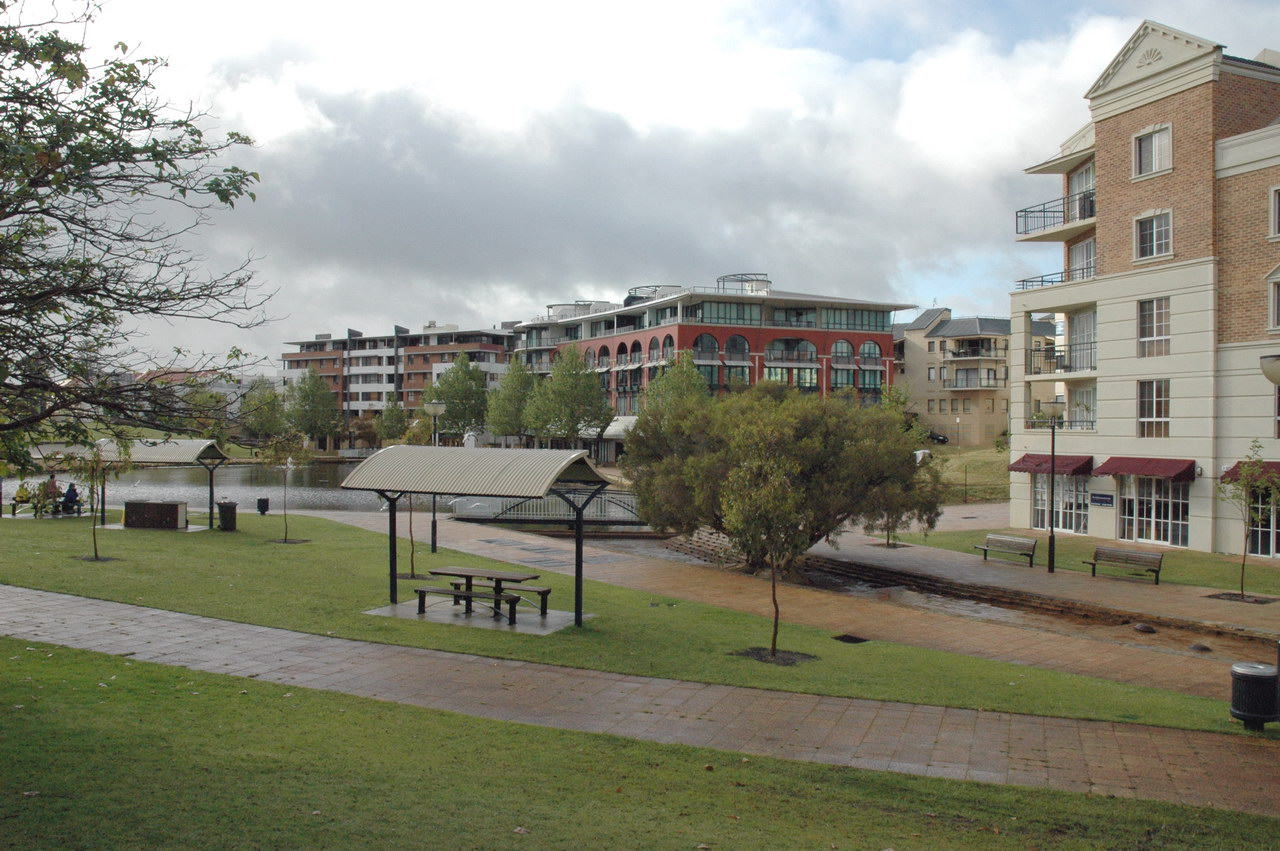
- East Perth apartments
- Interactive map of East Perth
- Coordinates: 31.957°S 115.876°E
- Country: Australia
- State: Western Australia
- City: Perth
- LGAs: City of Perth; City of Vincent
- Location: 2 km (1.2 mi) from Perth

Government
  - State electorate: Perth
  - Federal division: Perth

Area
  - Total: 3.3 km^{2} (1.3 sq mi)

Population
  - Total: 11,681 (SAL 2021)
- Postcode: 6004
Suburbs around East Perth
Perth	Mount Lawley	Burswood
Perth	East Perth	Burswood
Swan River	South Perth	Victoria Park

External videos
- East Perth 1948 - 2010 Landgate Aerial Photography

East Perth is an inner suburb of Perth, Western Australia, located next to the Perth central business district. Claise Brook and Claisebrook Cove are within the suburb. Formerly characterised by industrial land uses and urban blight, the redevelopment of East Perth was, and remains, the largest inner-city urban renewal project in the state. The design of the new residential neighbourhoods was strongly influenced by the new urbanism movement.

== Land use ==
Primarily an industrial area in the early twentieth century, it was the location of the East Perth Gas Works, East Perth Power Station (which was decommissioned and the building is intended to be renovated for other purposes), and the East Perth railway yard and engine sheds.

From the early 1980s, virtually all of the residential real estate on the western side of Lord Street became home to commercial enterprises; the buildings remain, either single or duplex dwellings previously inhabited mostly by migrant families.

== Population ==
In the 2016 Census, there were 10,596 people in East Perth. 30.3% of people were born in Australia. The most common countries of birth were England 6.7%, China 4.0%, India 3.7%, Malaysia 3.4% and South Korea 2.9%. 47.6% of people only spoke English at home. Other languages spoken at home included Mandarin 6.6%, Korean 2.7%, Cantonese 2.6%, Portuguese 2.0% and Spanish 1.9%. The most common responses for religion were No Religion 33.3% and Catholic 18.4%.

== Transport ==
The former East Perth railway yard and engine sheds were removed in the 1960s and redeveloped into the headquarters of Westrail – consolidating a very scattered system of offices and sections for the railways.

East Perth serves as the main hub for country and interstate rail services and road coach services. Departing from the station are services such as the Prospector, AvonLink, tourist trains, and the Indian Pacific.

The original East Perth railway station is now called Claisebrook, and while it has the same number of platforms that it did in the 1960s, the original buildings have given way to modern shelters. It is also the location of the Goongoongup Bridge on the railway to Bunbury for the South Western Railway.

There are several bus routes in and around East Perth, and the Red CAT connects East Perth with the Central Business District and beyond.

== Bridges ==
The Causeway is a road linking East Perth to Victoria Park on the other side of the Swan River. Under construction is the Boorloo Bridge as well, which is expected to open in December 2024.

Matagarup Bridge is a footbridge connecting East Perth to Perth Stadium and Burswood.

== Redevelopment Authority ==
The East Perth Redevelopment Authority (EPRA) was established in 1991 to manage the redevelopment and urbanisation of the suburb. In 2012 EPRA merged with other redevelopment authorities to become the Metropolitan Redevelopment Authority (MRA). In 2019, the MRA became part of DevelopmentWA. Many parts of East Perth that have been fully developed have been normalised – meaning returned to the City of Perth for administration.

== Sports ==
Main sporting attractions include the WACA Ground and Gloucester Park trotting ground.

There are also public recreation facilities for AFL and Cricket at Moort-ak Waadiny / Wellington Square.

== Education ==
Educational facilities include Trinity College, a day school for boys, years 4–12. East Perth Primary School is planned to open in 2029.

== Cemetery ==
East Perth is the location of Perth's significant early colonial era cemetery, which contains graves of many early colonial families. Its condition is marginal due to the loss of many headstones and lack of adequate record of graves, only 800 of the estimated 10,000 grave sites have been identified.

== See also ==
- Restaurant Amusé

== General references ==
- Bodycoat, Ronald. (1993) East Perth heritage study : prepared for the East Perth Development Authority East Perth, W.A. The Authority. 2 volumes (Volume 1 only held in Battye Library).
