= Archbishop's Palace, Perth =

Building in Perth, Western Australia

Coordinates: 31°57′22″S 115°51′56″E

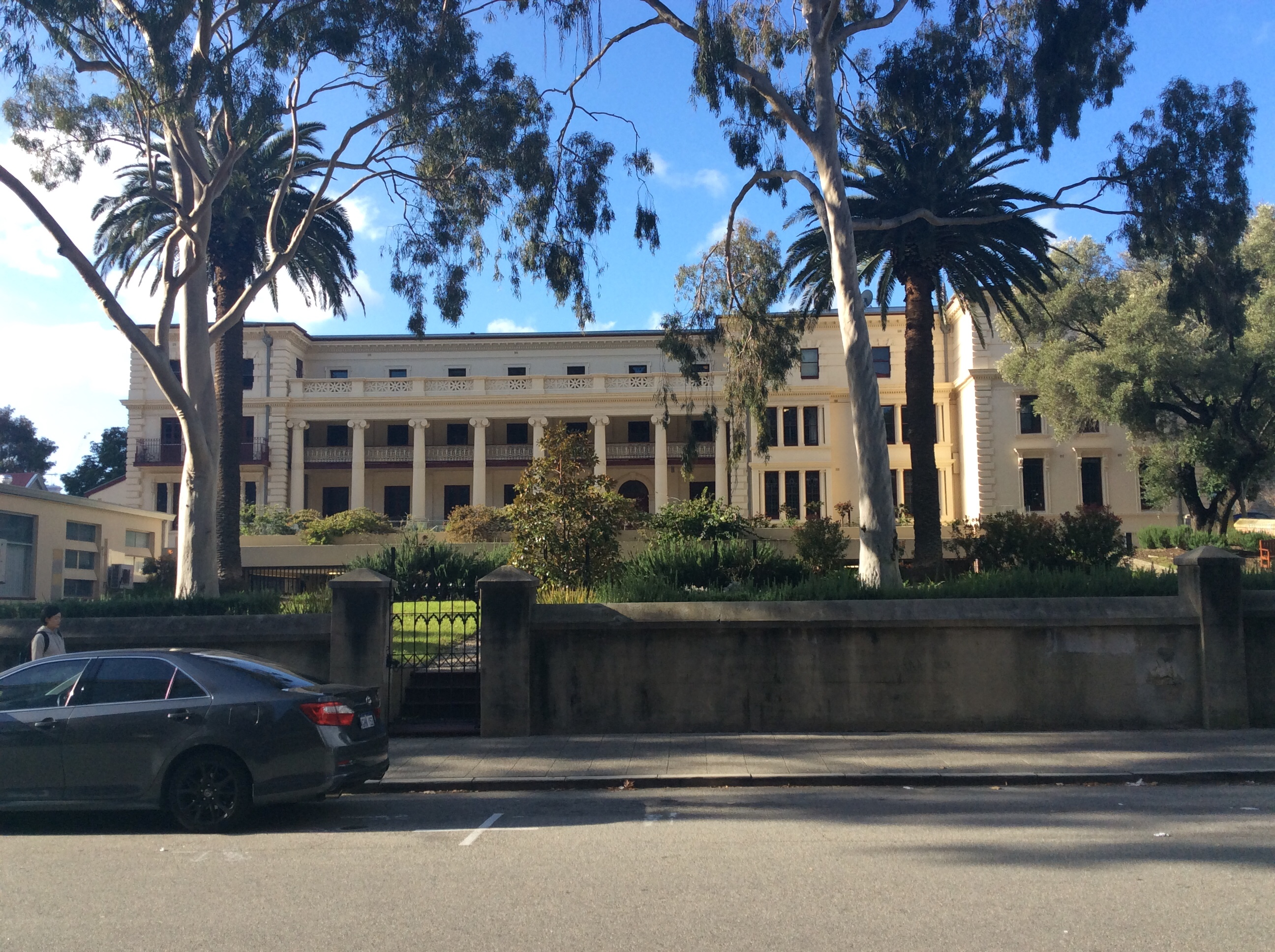
Southern face of Archbishop's Palace

Archbishop's Palace is a heritage-listed building in Perth, Western Australia, used by bishops and archbishops of Perth since 1855. In addition to the cultural value to the Roman Catholic community, the palace is a good example of architect Michael Cavanagh's Federation Academic Classical style, and a prominent landmark within the Victoria Square precinct. It is also known as the Catholic Church Office, and Roman Catholic Presbytery.

== History ==
In the 1840s, Perth's first bishop, Father Brady, bought a large amount of land around Victoria Square to accommodate the expected growth of the Roman Catholic population. His successor, Father Joseph Serra, was appointed in 1850, and following an 1853 visit to Rome determined he should have an episcopal palace to live in. Work began in late 1855 with Serra making measurements for the palace building, which was constructed by 33 brothers from the Diocese of Perth.

The palace's condition had deteriorated by 1911, and the internal furnishings were per Benedictine principles sparse, and without modern comforts and conveniences. Archbishop Clune oversaw a renovation in 1911 to increase accommodation and office space, including a new eastern wing. Architect Michael Cavanagh designed the additions and alteration, which cost £A 7,000, equivalent to A$1.1 million in 2022. Further works in 1936 added a new section on the eastern side to house the increased administrative functions of the Roman Catholic Church.

By 2009, the Archbishop's Palace had again deteriorated, almost to a state of dereliction. Construction works in 2009 restored the outside of the building, updated the interior with new electrical and hydraulic services, installed a glass elevator, and built an underground car park. The project, designed by Philip Griffiths Architects and constructed by Colgan Industries, won a 2010 City of Perth Heritage Award and the 2011 MBA Best Historic Restoration and Renovation, as well as the Award for Heritage at the 2012 Western Australian Architecture Awards and the Award for Conservation and Adaptation at the 2012 City of Perth and Heritage Council Awards.

== Description ==
Archbishop's Palace is located at 17 Victoria Square in the suburb of Perth, adjacent to Victoria Avenue, with a frontage to Hay Street via a down-sloping garden. It is situated south of St Mary's Cathedral, and to the west of the Convent of Mercy, Mercedes College, and the earlier St John's Pro-Cathedral.

The palace is three storeys tall with a basement and corrugated asbestos sheets covering the roof. The building has cement rendering, and is modelled in the Federation Academic Classical architectural style. Double storey verandahs, supported by double storey ionic columns, line the northern and southern sides. Architectural features include quoining of corners and second floor windows, scroll brackets for various windows, and stained glass windows.

== See also ==
- List of heritage buildings in Perth, Western Australia
