= QV1 =

40-storey modernist skyscraper in Perth, Western Australia

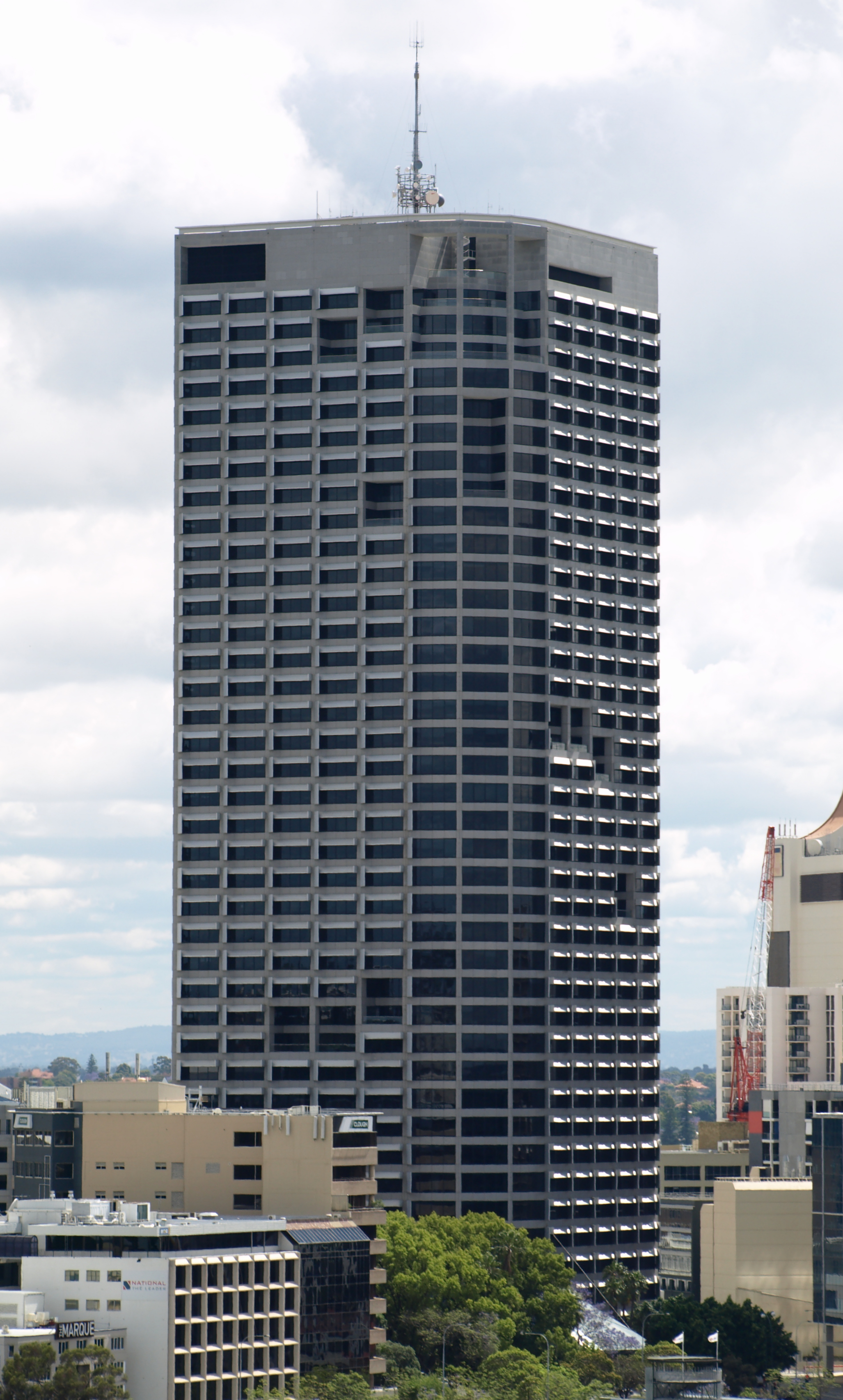
- QV1 tower
- Interactive map of the QV1 area

General information
- Type: Office tower
- Architectural style: Modernist
- Location: 250 St Georges Tce, Perth, Western Australia
- Coordinates: 31°57′8.55″S 115°51′3.33″E
- Current tenants: Allens; BP; Chevron Corporation; Clayton Utz; Herbert Smith Freehills; King & Wood Mallesons; WorleyParsons; CBRE; Sonic HealthPlus
- Construction started: 1988
- Completed: 1991
- Owner: Eureka Funds Management (50%); Investa Property Group (50%)
- Operator: CBRE

Height
- Roof: 163 m (535 ft)

Technical details
- Floor count: 40 (38 tenantable)
- Floor area: 59,566 m^{2} (641,160 sq ft) (tower only)

Design and construction
- Architects: Harry Seidler & Associates
- Developer: Barrack Properties, Kajima Corporation & Interstruct

Website
- qv1.com.au

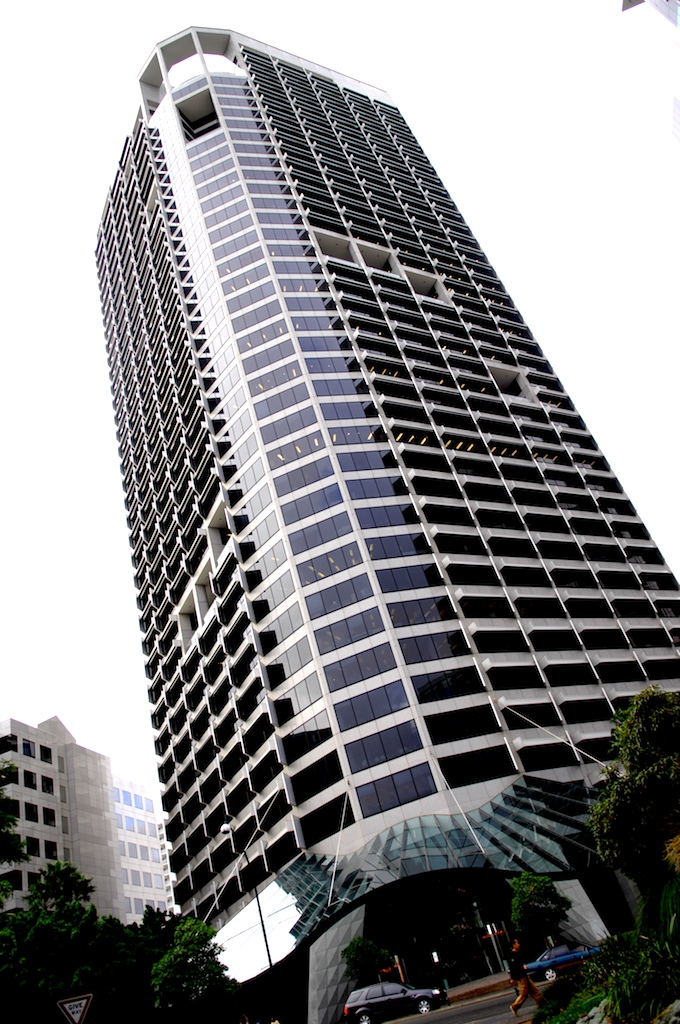
The tower's windows feature extensive use of sun shading.

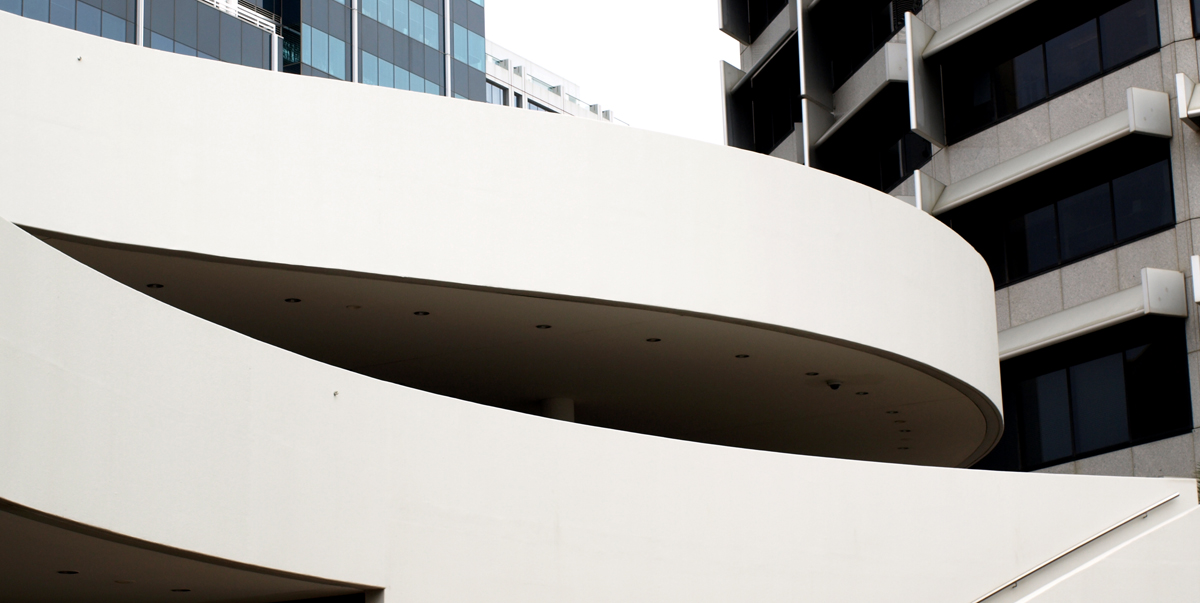
The Plaza buildings were designed to have "free, curvilinear shapes" to balance the "precise geometric form" of the tower.

QV1 is a 40-storey modernist skyscraper in Perth, Western Australia. Completed in 1991, the 163-metre (535 ft) building is the fourth-tallest building in Perth, after Central Park, Brookfield Place and 108 St Georges Terrace. The project was designed by architect Harry Seidler & Associates and has won numerous awards for its innovative design and energy efficiency.

== Site and construction history ==
The property, which fronts St Georges Terrace, Hay Street and a whole block on Milligan Street, was home to various buildings, including two 11-storey buildings and, at the corner of Hay and Milligan Streets, the first Fast Eddys burger bar.

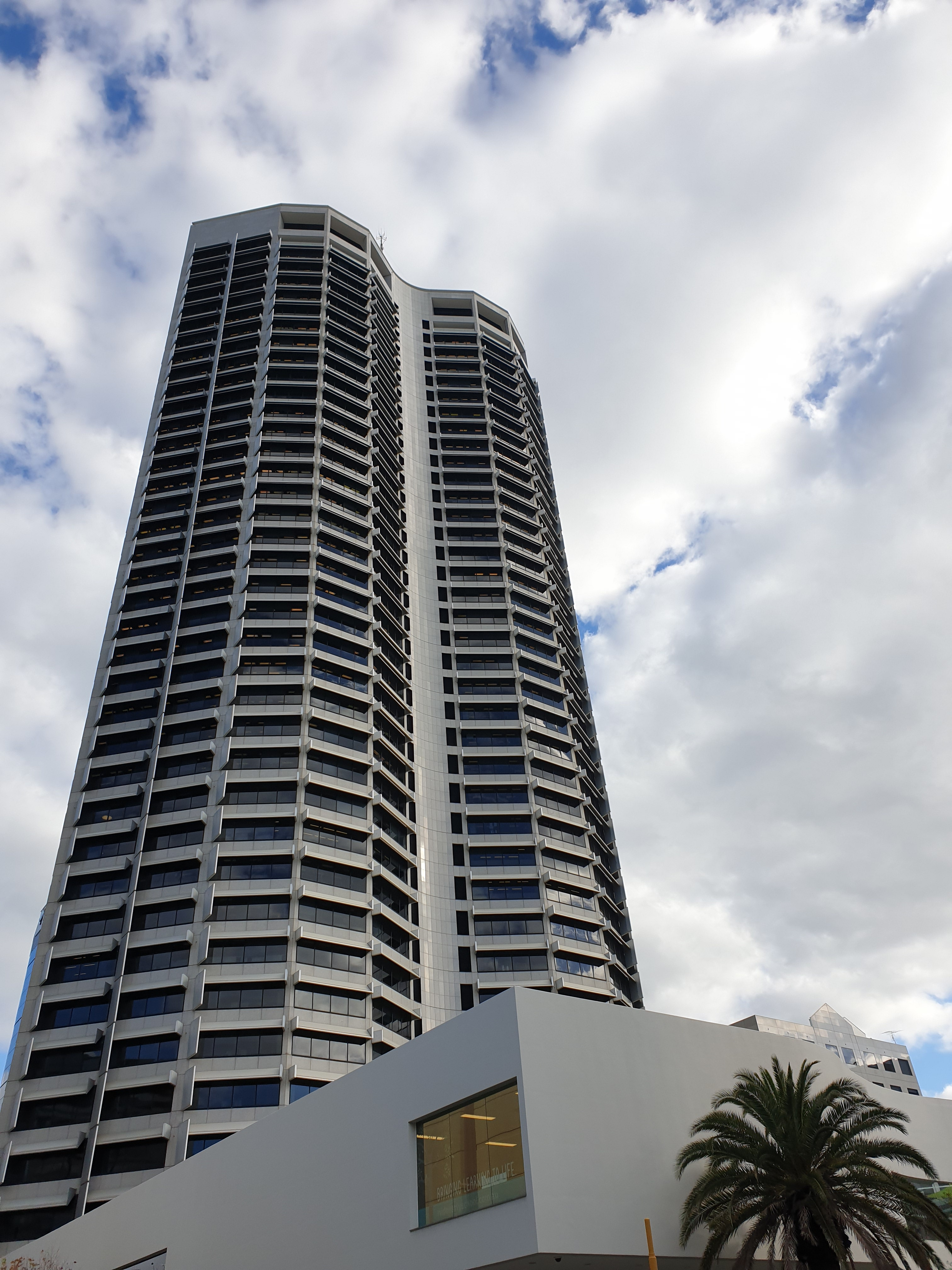

Planning for the redevelopment began in the second half of the 1980s, with the design done by Harry Seidler & Associates. The site fell partially within the boundaries of the statutory Parliamentary Precinct, which limited skyscraper heights near Parliament House. The Environmental Committee of the Royal Australian Institute of Architects (WA Branch) recommended that the requirements for the precinct be amended to allow the development to take place. The tower was named "Q.V.1" after the Latin phrase Quo vadis (meaning "where are you going?").

With the plans finalised and approved, the site was purchased in 1989 for $30 million by a joint venture between Barrack Properties (50% share), Kajima Corporation (30%) and Interstruct (20%). The purchase also included a site across Hay Street, which would be turned into a 4.5-storey car park for the development. The owners of the Fast Eddys restaurant had wanted to incorporate this restaurant into the new development, however they accepted a $5.2 million offer from the developers, and instead moved the restaurant to the corner of Murray and Milligan streets.

Finance on the tower had been made possible by a put option granted by BT Property Trust and the New South Wales State Superannuation Board, whereby for an estimated fee of $20 million they agreed to buy the tower upon completion for $340 million if the option was exercised. However, during construction of the tower, Perth property prices suffered a major collapse as demand for office space slumped. In August 1991, just six weeks out from completion, the building did not have a single tenant, and was regarded as one of the great white elephants of the Australian property scene. The owners exercised the option in 1991 upon completion of the project, handing joint ownership to the New South Wales Superannuation Board and BT Property Trust.

== Post-completion ==
After QV1's opening in 1991, Perth's office vacancy rate hit a high of 73.6% in 1993. However, by 1996 the tower was fully leased and in June 1998 remained the only premium-grade office tower in the city to be fully leased.

When the tower was completed, some suggested the tower was too far west in the central business district. However, the securing of WAPET (now Chevron Australia) as a tenant in QV1 was regarded as a turning point for the precinct, and helped to establish the west end of the CBD as a resources sector.

For many years the roof of the building has been used as a base from which to launch fireworks shells in the city's annual City of Perth Skyworks fireworks display on Australia Day. Also, following the death of the tower's architect Harry Seidler on 9 March 2006, a powerful light was temporarily installed on the roof of QV1 to shine a beam into the sky as a memorial.

The BTA Property Trust sold its half-stake in the building in 1998 to corporate stablemate BT Office Trust for $130.6 million. In 2003 that half-stake was acquired by Investa Property Group, which in 2006 valued QV1 at $400 million. The other 50% is owned by Eureka Funds Management.

== Design ==
According to architect Harry Seidler, one of the architectural objectives in the design of QV1 was to minimise the impact of the tower when viewed from Parliament House, and this was addressed by offering a narrow profile to that direction. This was necessary to secure government approval for the construction of the tower within the Parliamentary Precinct. To this end, none of the building's facades point directly towards the Parliament building. On the northern side of the site is a two-level retail plaza that originally featured an artificial waterfall and pond. The waterfall has since been removed and the size of the pond reduced substantially.

Another of the design briefs identified by Harry Seidler was that the building should employ passive design in order to minimise energy costs. This is achieved through the use of tinted double glazed windows, as well as the installation alongside windows of horizontal and vertical sun shades. The use of sun shades alone was estimated to reduce the building's cooling costs by $70,000 per year. The building also features separate air-conditioning units for each floor, so that energy does not need to be wasted cooling or heating unoccupied floors. This can lead to substantial energy savings because in Perth's warm climate cooling costs can account for 60 to 70% of total building energy consumption.

The tower has a reinforced concrete core, measuring 21.5 metres (71 ft) on each side, which bears lateral forces including wind loading. The perimeter of the building features reinforced concrete support columns spaced 7.3 metres (24 ft) apart, and there are no internal columns within floors. The perimeter columns and the core support 14.3-metre (47 ft) clear span post-tensioned beams 3.6 metres (12 ft) apart, with concrete slabs spanning between them. These beams are terminated slightly short so that they can be used as mechanical ducts. Some floors feature landscaped balcony gardens on their south faces, and the top floors feature two tiers of luxurious penthouse offices with landscaped terraces.

The main entrance to QV1 from St Georges Terrace features a set of stone-clad hyperboloid supports that carry the loads of the two perimeter columns which terminate above them on the third floor. The lowest two office floors are mezzanines so that the ceiling in the lobby is an imposing 14 metres (46 ft) high. The St Georges Terrace entrance is also protected from the elements by a flowing 50-metre (160 ft) suspended glass canopy. The building is clad with polished granite.

The modernist building was criticised for being "Perth's most ugly building" and "a giant Lego block", but architect Harry Seidler described QV1 as "the best building he had ever built".

== Awards ==
Awards which have been won by QV1 include:

- 1992 Royal Australian Institute of Architects (WA) Architecture Design Award – Commercial buildings over $200 million
- 1992 Royal Australian Institute of Architects (WA) Commendation – Civic Design Award for Commercial Buildings
- 1992 Royal Australian Institute of Architects (National) – Best design for a commercial building (over $200 million)
- 1992 Master Builders Association of Australia – Best workmanship for a building (over $200 million)
- 1999 Master Builders Association of Australia – National Energy Efficiency Award for Commercial Buildings (joint winner with Stadium Australia)
- 2019 Richard Roach Jewell Award for Enduring Architecture

== See also ==
- List of tallest buildings in Perth
- List of tallest buildings in Australia
