= List of Catholic churches in Australia =

This is a list of Catholic churches in Australia.

== Cathedrals ==
See: List of cathedrals in Australia#Roman Catholic

- Cathedral of St Stephen, Brisbane
- Holy Name Cathedral, Brisbane
- Sacred Heart Cathedral, Bendigo
- St Francis Xavier's Cathedral, Adelaide
- St Francis Xavier's Cathedral, Wollongong
- St John's Pro-Cathedral
- St Mary's Cathedral, Perth
- St Mary's Cathedral, Sydney
- St Patrick's Cathedral, Melbourne
- St Patrick's Cathedral, Parramatta

== Basilicas ==
- Our Lady of Victories Basilica, Camberwell
- St Mary of the Angels Basilica, Geelong
- St Patrick's Basilica, Fremantle

== Other churches ==
- St Brigid's Church, Millers Point, Sydney
- St Patrick's Church, The Rocks, Sydney
- Blessed Virgin Mary Queen of Peace, Scone
- First St. Mary's Roman Catholic Church, Warwick
- Our Lady of the Sacred Heart Church, Randwick
- Our Lady of the Sacred Heart Church, Thursday Island
- St Brigid's Church, Perth
- St Mary Star of the Sea, West Melbourne
- St Francis Catholic Church (Melbourne)
- St James, Muswellbrook
- St Thomas Aquinas Church (Springwood, New South Wales)
- Sacred Heart Church St Kilda
- Tennant Creek Catholic Church

== See also ==
- List of Roman Catholic dioceses in Australia
- Roman Catholicism in Australia
