= Fast Eddys =

Defunct Australian restaurant chain

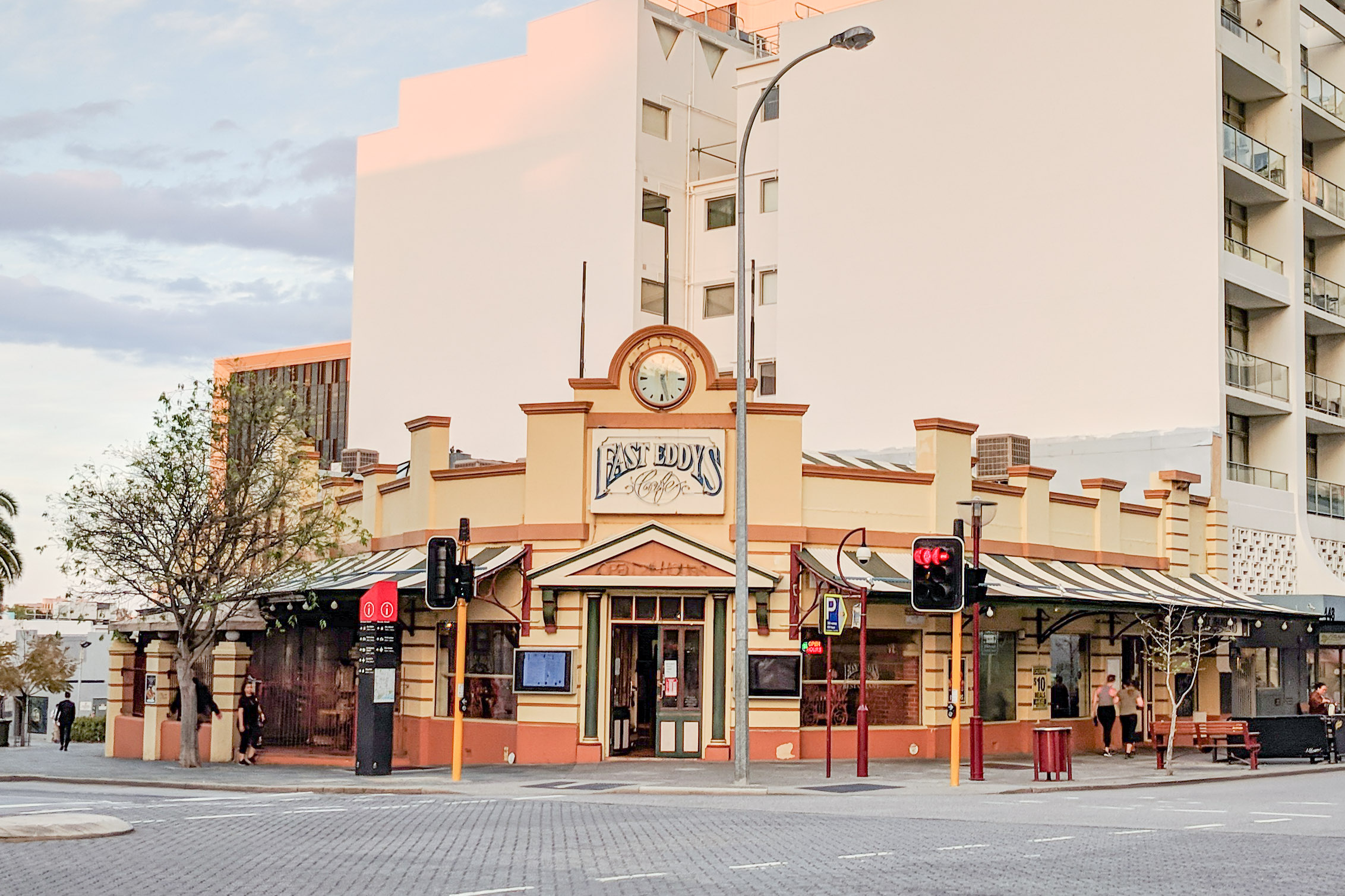
- Fast Eddys restaurant on Murray Street, Perth in October 2018
- Industry: Restaurant
- Founded: 1979
- Founders: Christopher Somas; Con Somas
- Defunct: May 2019

Fast Eddys was a fast food and restaurant chain that primarily operated in Perth, Australia, and also briefly in Adelaide, Cairns, Melbourne, as well as in New South Wales. Fast Eddys was most notable at the time of its establishment for being one of the few Perth restaurants open 24/7 including public holidays.

In May 2019, the final restaurant in the Perth CBD closed after 41 years in business.

== Style ==
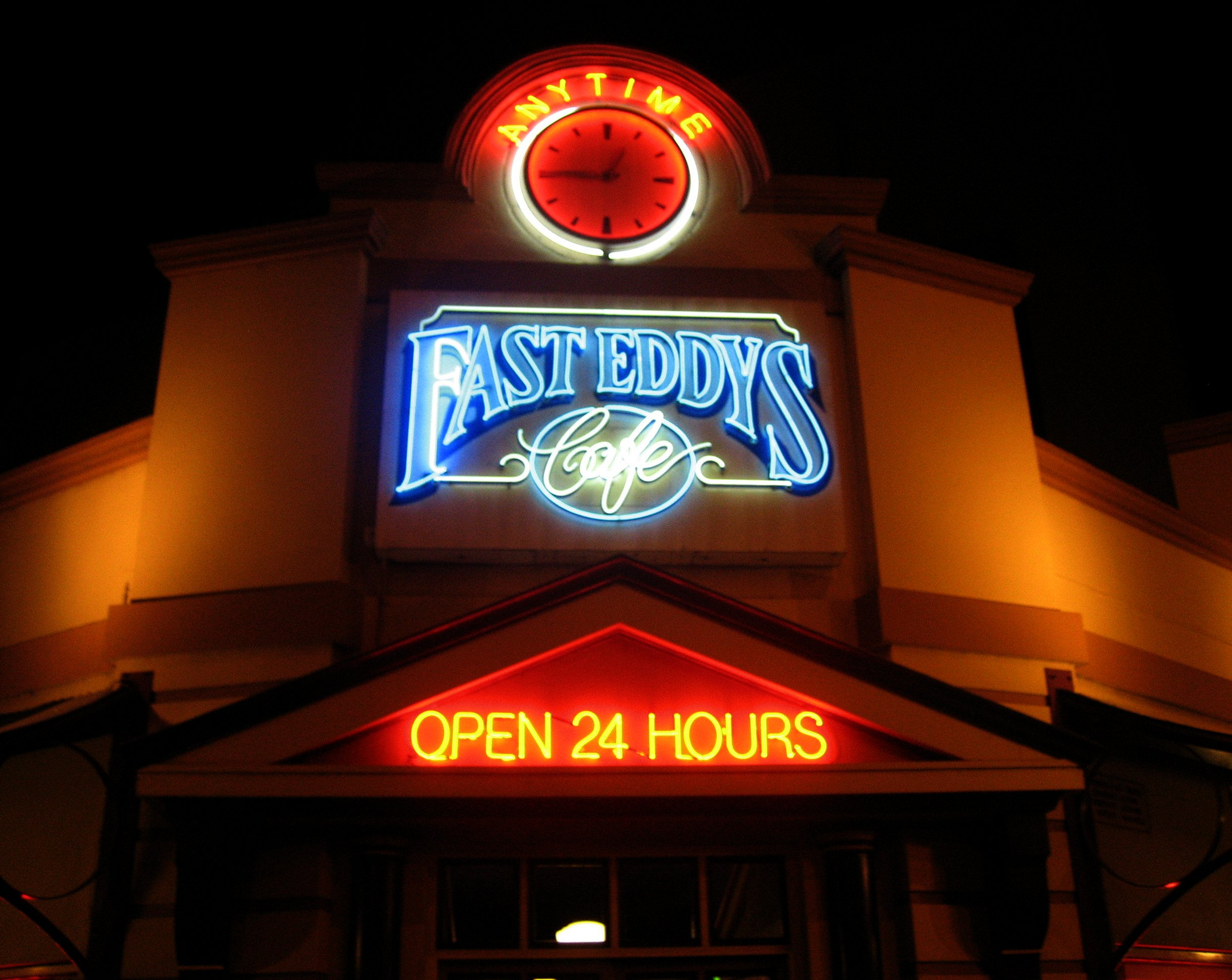
The Fast Eddys logo above the entrance to Fast Eddys in the Perth CBD

The restaurants were split up into two sections, a sit-down table service restaurant and a take-away section. The take-away section had similar food to the restaurant experience, however it was less expensive, and tailored for the take-away market. The restaurants were decorated with various historic memorabilia such as old advertising signs and number plates.

The flagship burger was the Eddy Burger. Other items included the Cop-the-Lot Burger, the Steakburger and the Super Hotdog. The restaurant also served all-day breakfast items.

== History ==
Fast Eddys was founded in 1979 at the west end of the Perth CBD, on the corner of Hay and Milligan streets by Christopher and Con Somas. The restaurant moved to a new location at 454 Murray Street in the early 1990s, where it remained until its closure in 2019.

By the mid-1990s, Christopher and Con Somas had sold the business. In the following years, the new owners Ernie and Mark Galloway opened new restaurants across Western Australia, and by 2001 the company expanded into New South Wales, South Australia and Victoria. However, in 2002 the company was placed in receivership, with most of the restaurants closing down in the eastern states, and the Western Australian restaurants being sold off as franchises.

Apart from the original Perth CBD restaurant, other locations of Fast Eddys restaurants in Western Australia included Morley, Armadale, Cannington, Midland, and Kalgoorlie. The Melbourne restaurant operated at 32-38 Bourke Street, in the Melbourne central business district. It closed in February 2003.

In 2018, the remaining 454 Murray Street location was sold to a Chinese investor for $4.8 million; the restaurant's tenancy of the property was reported to expire in June 2019, with options to extend. However the restaurant would ultimately close for good in May 2019. The vacated building and the Fast Eddys facade would remain untouched as of September 2026; however there are plans to clear the site and replace it with a mixed-used development.
