= Andrew Wilson (architect) =

Australian architect (1866–1950)

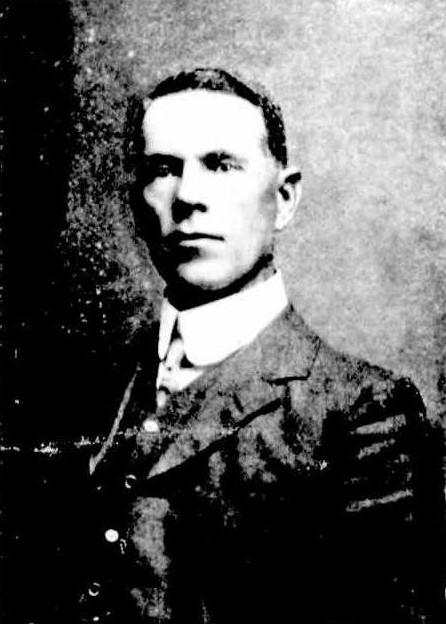
- Portrait from the Kalgoorlie Western Argus, published for the opening of the Town Hall in 1908.
- Born: Andrew Oswald Wilson; 12 October 1866; Victoria, Australia
- Died: 19 June 1950 (aged 83); Melbourne, Australia
- Occupation: Architect
- Buildings: Boulder Town Hall

Andrew Oswald Wilson (1866–1950), known professionally as A. Oswald Wilson, was an early-20th-century Western Australian architect. Born and trained as a carpenter in Victoria, he moved first to Perth and then to the Eastern Goldfields (in December 1899), where he worked for Murdock McKay Hopkins. He was president of the Mechanics' Literary and Debating Society (also known as the Boulder Literary Society) in Boulder from 1904 to 1908, as well as active in the Boulder Benevolent Society. One of his best-known buildings is the Boulder town hall for which he submitted designs in 1907. In December 1908, he moved back to Perth and practised from Forrest Chambers (at 62 St George's Terrace).

On 17 December 1910, aged 44, he married May Livingstone in Perth, and in 1917 they left Australia for England, where Wilson enlisted in the Army.

Wilson died on 19 June 1950 at St Andrew's Hospital in Melbourne. He was 83.

== Buildings ==
In chronological order.

Perth:

- 1899: West Perth Tennis Club (tennis courts at rear of West Perth Presbyterian Church)

Boulder (where he was "responsible for most of the more prominent buildings about the Boulder"):

- St Matthew's Rectory and Church
- Woman's Christian Temperance Union Girls' Home
- Dr Frank Sawell's residence and surgery (121 Piesse Street)
- 1908: Boulder Town Hall

Perth:

- 1909: George R. Brown's residence (The Avenue, Nedlands)
- 1913: West Perth Presbyterian Church Hall (cnr. Hay and Colin Streets; precursor to the Ross Memorial Church)
- 1914: Dunollie, his own residence (36 Congdon St, Swanbourne)
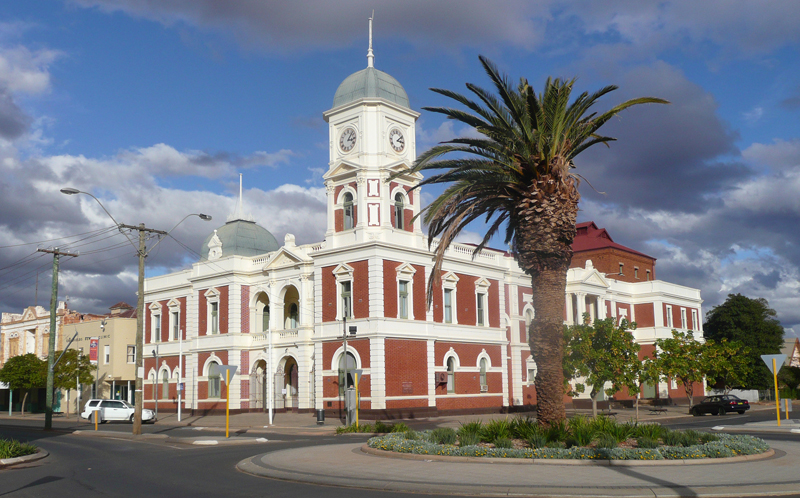
1908: Boulder Town Hall

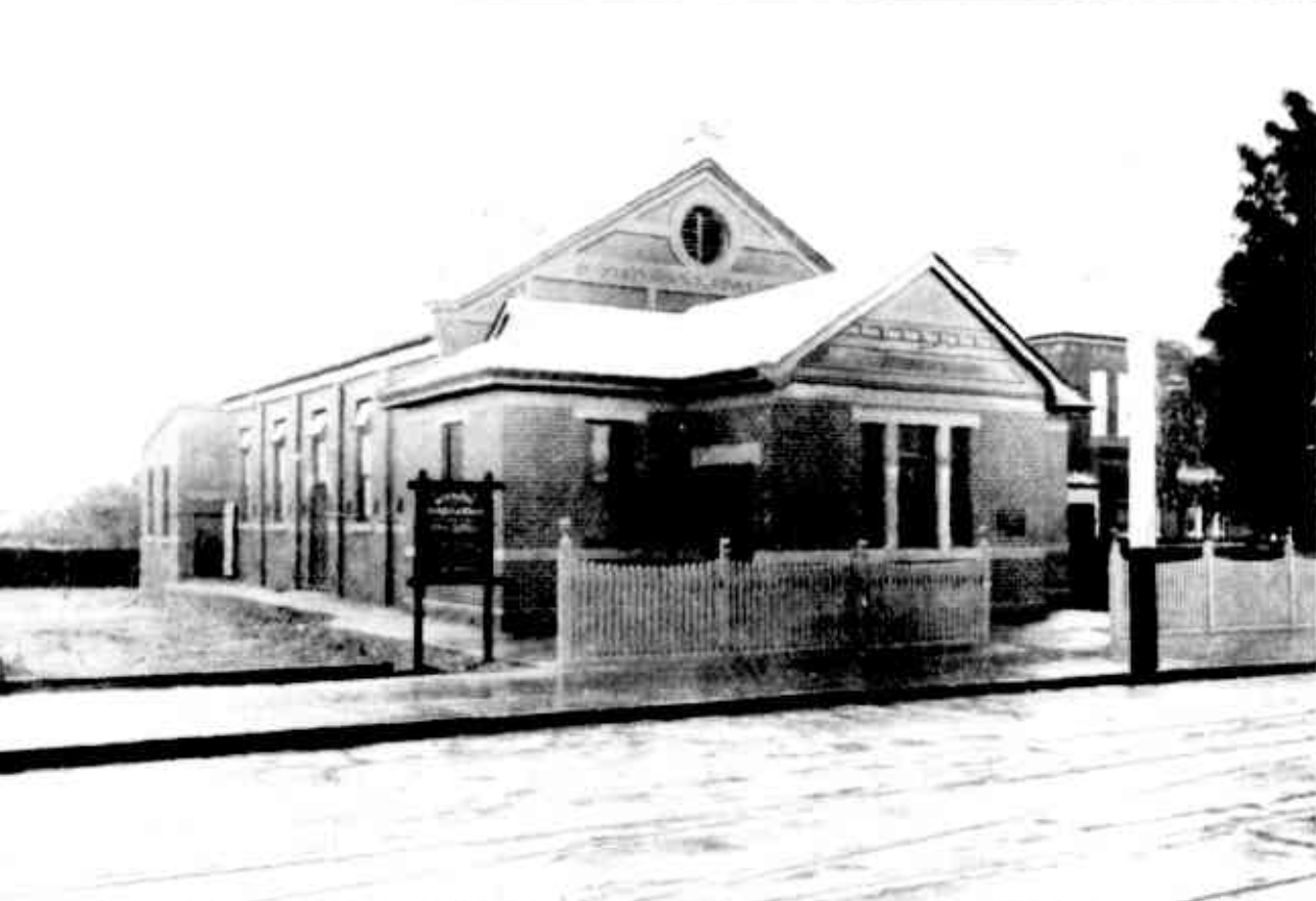
1913: West Perth Presbyterian Church Hall

== See also ==
- Edwin Summerhayes
