= Riverside Drive, Perth =

Road in Perth, Western Australia

Riverside Drive, Perth Western Australia
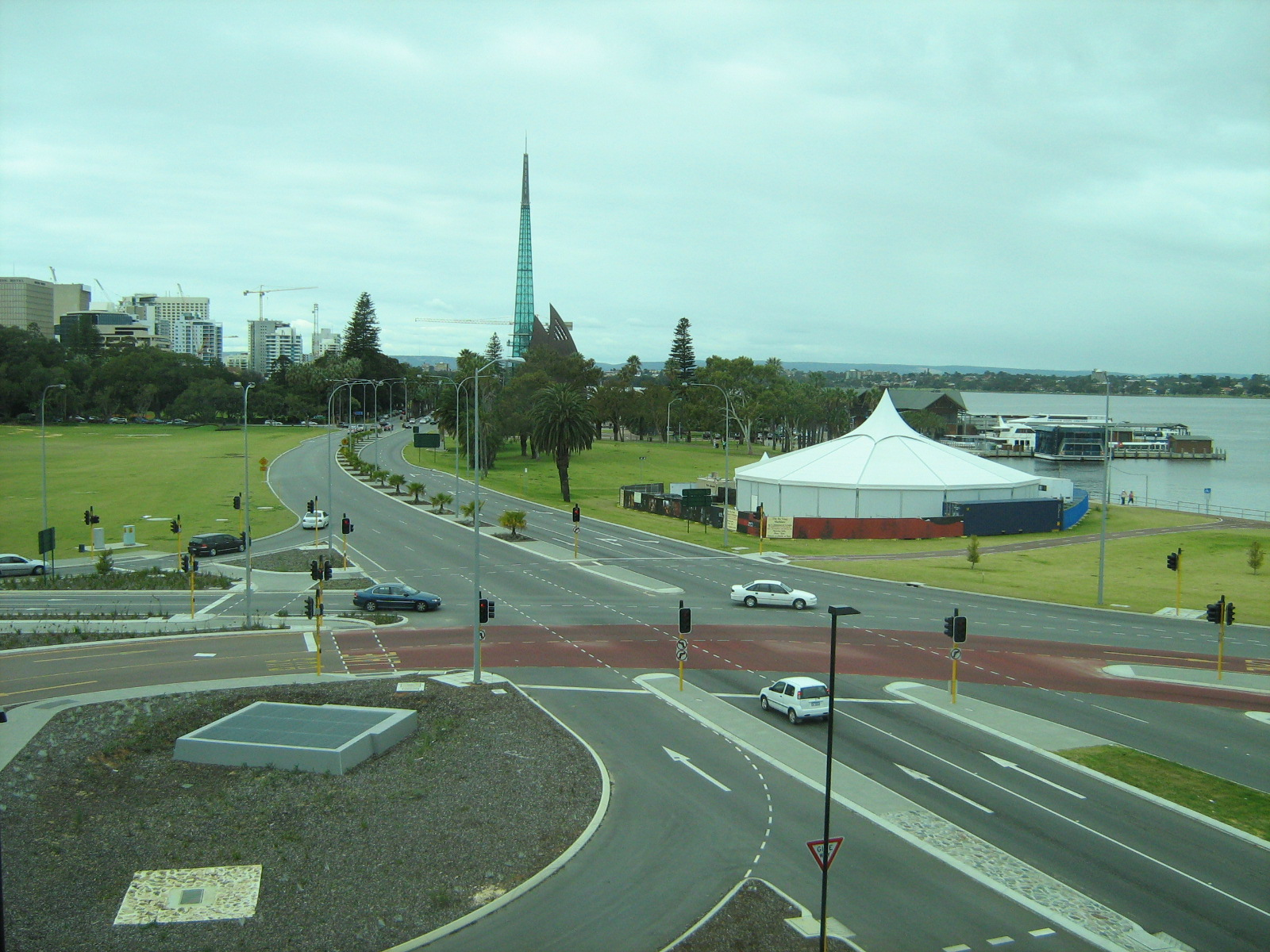
- View from the Perth Convention Centre in 2008 to a part of the road that no longer exists

General information
- Type: Road
- Length: 2 km (1.2 mi)
- Route number(s): State Route 5

Major junctions
Riverside Drive
- East end: The Causeway (State Route 5), East Perth
- Plain Street (State Route 65)
- West end: Barrack Street (State Route 53)
Birdiya Drive
- North-east end: William Street (State Route 53)
- Mitchell Freeway (State Route 2)
- South-west end: Mounts Bay Road (State Route 5), Perth

Riverside Drive in Perth, Western Australia, is a road on the northern side of Perth Water. It was built on reclaimed land in the 1930s, and links the Causeway to Barrack Street; prior to the construction of Elizabeth Quay, Riverside Drive extended to the Narrows Bridge.

== Route description ==
Riverside Drive is part of State Route 5. It begins at the intersection of The Causeway, Adelaide Terrace, and Hay Street, which is a traffic light controlled raindrop roundabout. Riverside Drive heads west-north-west, parallel to the edge of Perth Water and the city's other arterial roads. It passes by Langley Park and Supreme Court Gardens before reaching Barrack Street and the Barrack Street Jetty at Elizabeth Quay.

Until 26 January 2014, Riverside Drive continued through to William Street alongside the former site of The Esplanade, now the location of Elizabeth Quay. Ramps to the Kwinana Freeway and from the Mitchell Freeway connected to the intersection with William Street, with that former section of Riverside Drive continuing as a one-way road south-westbound, following the Swan River and passing beneath the Narrows Bridge, before ending at the Point Lewis Roundabout on Mounts Bay Road. This section has been replaced by Birdiya Drive, named after Birdiya meaning 'elders', 'leader' in Noongar.

== History ==
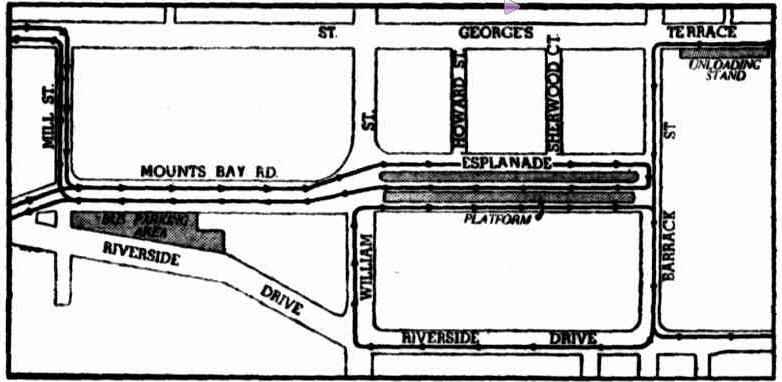
1950s plan for a bus station on the Esplanade which shows the then alignment of Riverside Drive. River reclamation during the construction of the Mitchell Freeway realigned Riverside Drive to run in a more southerly route.

Riverside Drive which was planned in 1903, but which was not completed until the 1930s due to the need to have reclaimed land on which to build the road.

Construction of the road in the 1930s was seen as a threat to the lightering trade on the Swan River between Perth and Fremantle.

In the early 20th century the name of the road carried beyond its current length; proposed river-side roads were mentioned for South Perth and the northern shore of the Swan River as far as Peppermint Grove.

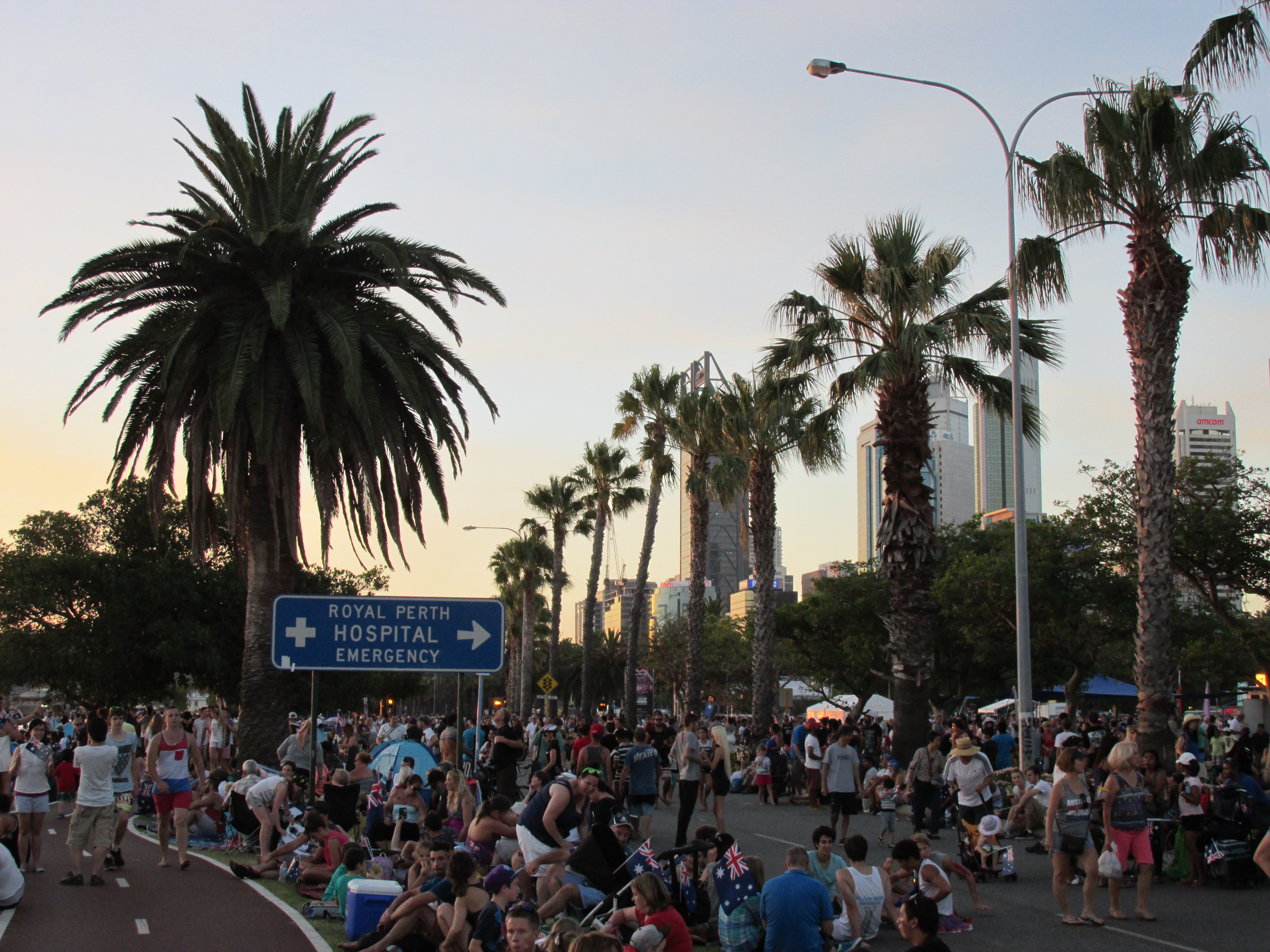
Crowds on Riverside Drive for the 2015 Australia Day celebrations

Plans to widen were proposed in 1985 and in 1986.

Significant changes in the landscaping along Riverside Drive were made in 1999.

At times of heavy rains and the Swan River flooding, Riverside Drive has been affected seriously, in the 1930s and 1940s as well as more recently.

=== Section closure ===
Riverside Drive was closed for the Australia Day celebrations and fireworks on 26 January 2014; however unlike other roads in the area, it remained closed between Barrack Street and William Street due to the construction of Elizabeth Quay.

Several groups and individuals have previously raised concerns about the impact on the Perth road network resulting from the diversion of Riverside Drive traffic around the new Elizabeth Quay inlet. The mayors of seven surrounding local government areas issued a joint statement stressing the importance of completing certain roadworks prior to the diversion of Riverside Drive. The Graham Farmer Freeway has had additional lanes installed in the Northbridge Tunnel to encourage motorists to bypass the city. The Royal Automobile Club raised early concerns that loss of the emergency lanes might affect emergency response times. Although a tunnel, either under the inlet or as part of one of the suggested alternative schemes, has previously been dismissed, the suggestion that a tunnel might be built at some time in the future has not been totally dismissed. In January 2014 the Opposition again raised concerns that the closure would lead to further congestion, but the Metropolitan Redevelopment Authority were confident that drivers would adapt to the change. In preparation for the closure, Riverside Drive had been reduced by one lane through that section.

On 4 November 2021, the western section of Riverside Drive was formally renamed Birdiya Drive to prevent confusion around which section of Riverside Drive to follow. Birdiya means 'elder', 'leader' in the Noongar language and was chosen following consultation with the City of Perth Aboriginal Elders Advisory Group.

== Intersections ==
=== Riverside Drive ===
| LGA | Location | km | mi | Destinations | Notes |
|---|---|---|---|---|---|
| Perth | Perth | 0.0 | 0.0 | Barrack Street (State Route 5) north - Mount Lawley, Fremantle / Barrack Square exits. | No turns permitted from Riverside Drive/Barrack Street to Barrack Square. Northwestern terminus, continues north as Barrack Street (State Route 5) |
| Perth | Perth | 0.25 | 0.16 | Governors Avenue | LILO junction |
| Perth | Perth | 0.55 | 0.34 | Victoria Avenue | |
| Perth | East Perth | 1.5 | 0.93 | Plain Street (State Route 65) - Mount Lawley, Maylands, Guildford | |
| Perth | East Perth | 2.1 | 1.3 | The Causeway (State Route 5) southeast / Adelaide Terrace northwest - Perth central business district, Fremantle, Victoria Park; Hay Street northeast – WACA Ground. | Southeastern terminus at traffic light controlled teardrop roundabout; continues as Hay Street. Traffic exiting Hay Street can only enter The Causeway southbound, Riverside Drive can only be accessed from The Causeway northbound. |
1.000 mi = 1.609 km; 1.000 km = 0.621 mi: Incomplete access

=== Birdiya Drive ===
| LGA | Location | km | mi | Destinations | Notes |
|---|---|---|---|---|---|
| Perth | Perth | 0.0 | 0.0 | William Street (State Route 5) - Northbridge, Mount Lawley | Northern terminus at sharp bend. |
| Perth | Perth | 0.3 | 0.19 | Kwinana Freeway (State Route 5)/ Elizabeth Quay bus station busway - Rockingham, Mandurah | Southbound entry ramp only. No access from Birdiya Drive eastbound. |
| Perth | Perth | 0.7 | 0.43 | Kwinana Freeway (State Route 5) - Rockingham, Mandurah | Southbound entry ramp only. No direct access from Birdiya Drive westbound. |
| Perth | Perth | 1.0 | 0.62 | Mounts Bay Road (State Route 5 westbound) - Crawley, Claremont, Fremantle | Point Lewis Rotary. Western terminus at roundabout with peak traffic lights on Mounts Bay Road eastbound. Access to the Kwinana freeway southbound entry ramp. |
1.000 mi = 1.609 km; 1.000 km = 0.621 mi: Incomplete access
