= Ross Memorial Church =

- Ross Memorial Uniting Church
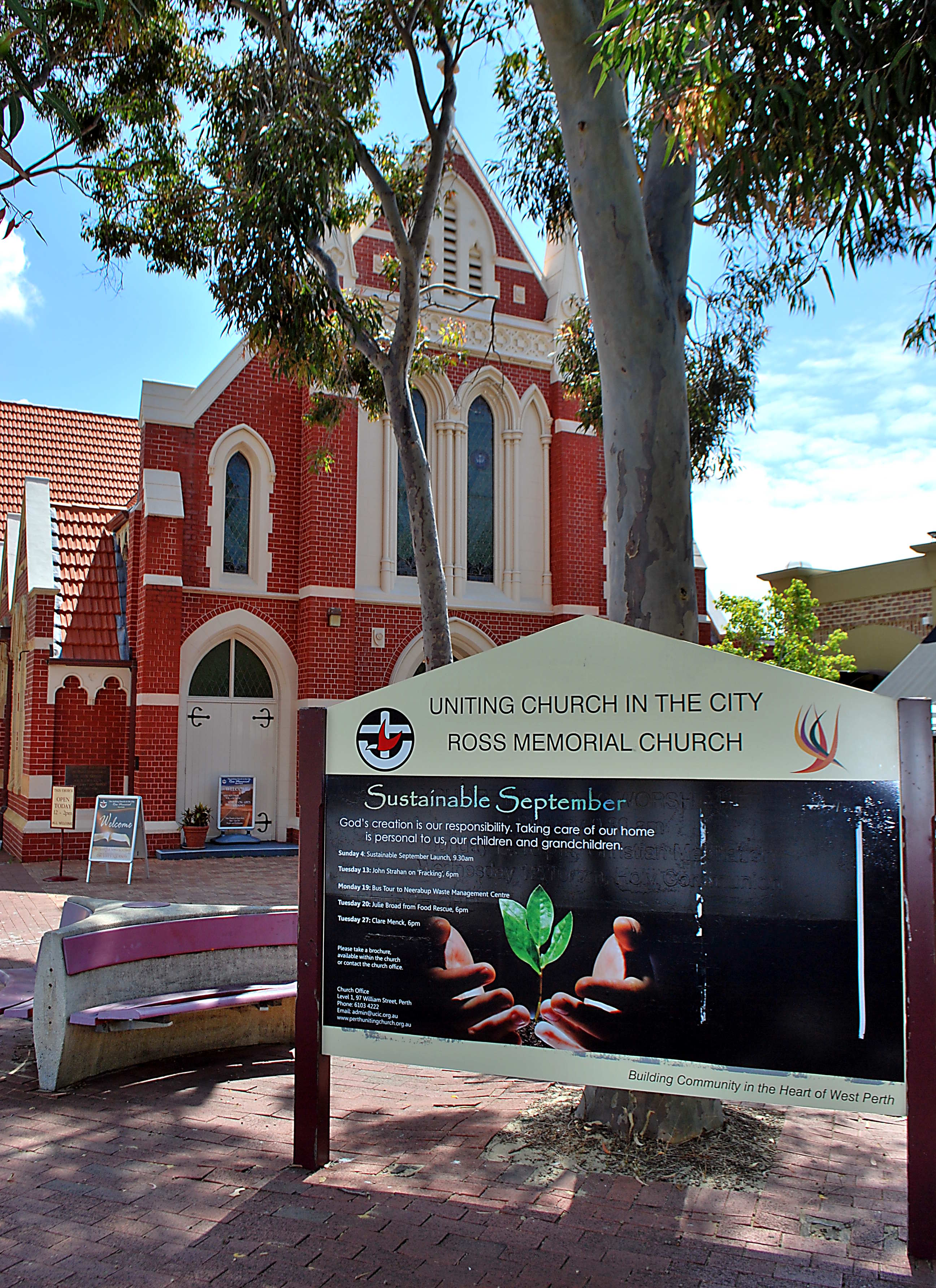
- Ross Memorial Church, Perth
- Ross Memorial Church
- 31°56′55″S 115°50′33″E
- Location: Hay St & Colin St, West Perth, Western Australia
- Country: Australia
- Denomination: Uniting
- Previous denomination: Presbyterian
- Website: Ross Memorial Church

History
- Former name: West Perth Presbyterian Church
- Status: Church
- Founded: 15 July 1916
- Founders: Sir John Forrest; Lady Forrest
- Dedication: Rev. Daniel Ross
- Dedicated: 1917

Architecture
- Functional status: Active
- Architect: James Hine
- Architectural type: Church
- Style: Federation Gothic Revival
- Completed: 1917
- Construction cost: A£4,147

Specifications
- Materials: Red brick; sandstone

Administration
- Parish: Uniting Church in the City

The Ross Memorial Church is a Uniting church on Hay Street in West Perth, Western Australia, Australia. Established as a Presbyterian church in 1917, the church is home of the Wesley worshipping community of the Uniting Church in the City.

== History ==
Five years prior to the construction of the church a brick hall (designed by Andrew Oswald Wilson) was built adjacent to the church's site, as the congregation was growing too large for their earlier Havelock Street hall, where they had been for nearly 17 years. That earlier site was sold to the Catholic community, and the Hay Street land purchased from them for the purpose of constructing a church, hall, and manse.

The church is named after Daniel Ross, who was minister of the West Perth Presbyterian congregation until his death in 1917. It was completed in 1917 at a total construction cost of £4,147.

The architect for the project was James Hine, FRIBA, and the building contractor was R. A. Gamble. It was built in the Federation Gothic Revival style. The church contains a pipe organ chamber with case, and display pipes arranged in 3 towers.

Senator Agnes Robertson was a longtime member of the church, teaching the girls' Bible class and becoming one of the first women to serve as a lay preacher.

Plaques on the walls describe the dedication and West Perth Heritage Trail text:

=== Dedication ===
This stone was laid
by the Right Honourable
Sir John Forrest
P.C., G.C.M.G., L.L.D..
Assisted by Lady Forrest
15th July 1916.

James Hine, F.R.I.B.A.,
Architect

R. A. Gamble,
Contractor

=== Heritage trail ===
The West Perth Presbyterian Church was first
established in Havelock Street in 1898. However, as the
congregation swelled during the gold boom years of the
1890s and early 1900s, it was found to be too small.
The Ross Memorial Church was built during the First
World War (1914 - 18), largely as a result of the efforts of
the Reverend Ross, who died only a few months after its
completion in 1917.

== Heritage list ==
The church building is listed with the Heritage Council of Western Australia, as Heritage Place No. 2235.

== Gallery ==
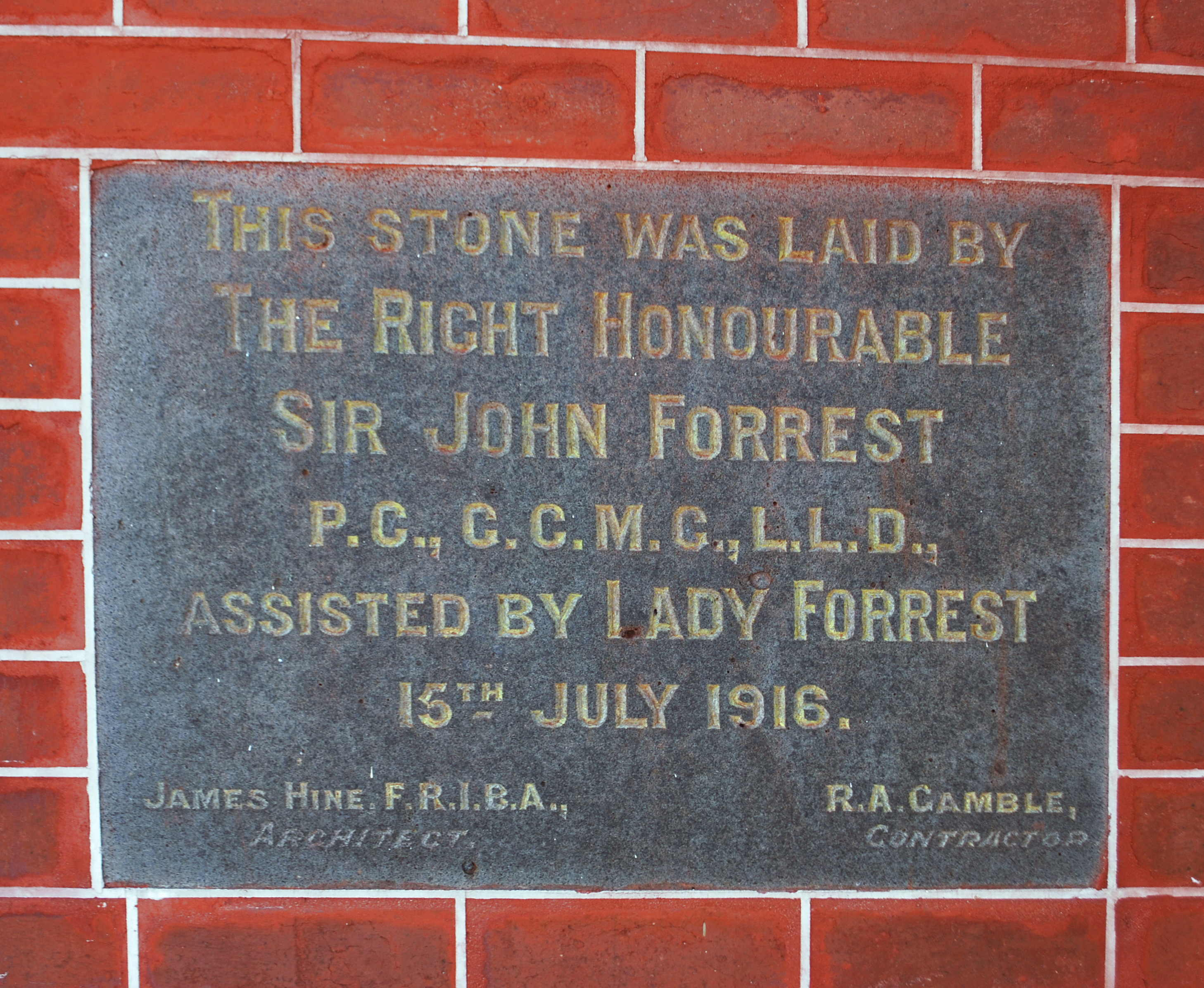
Dedication plaque

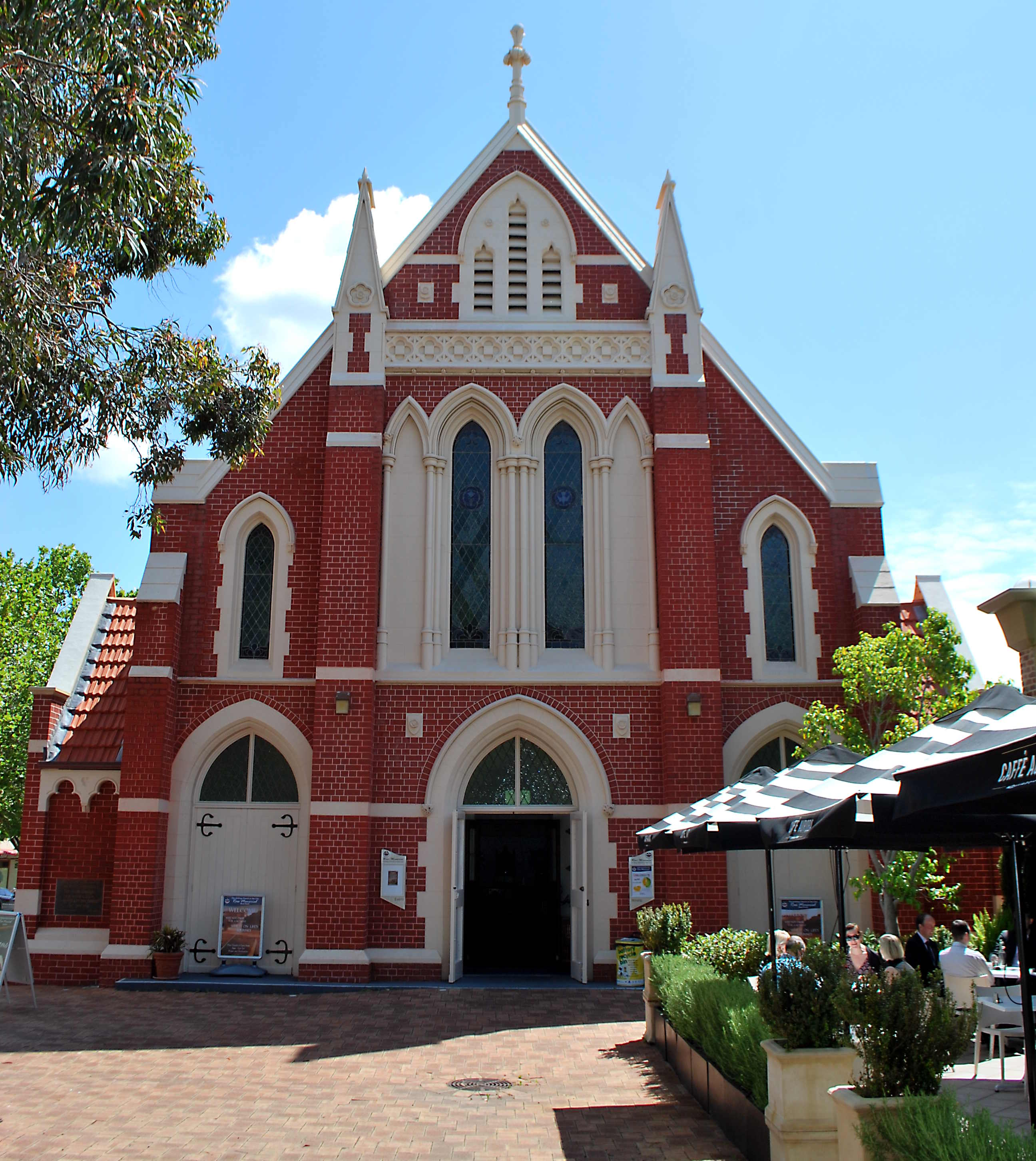
Viewed from Hay Street

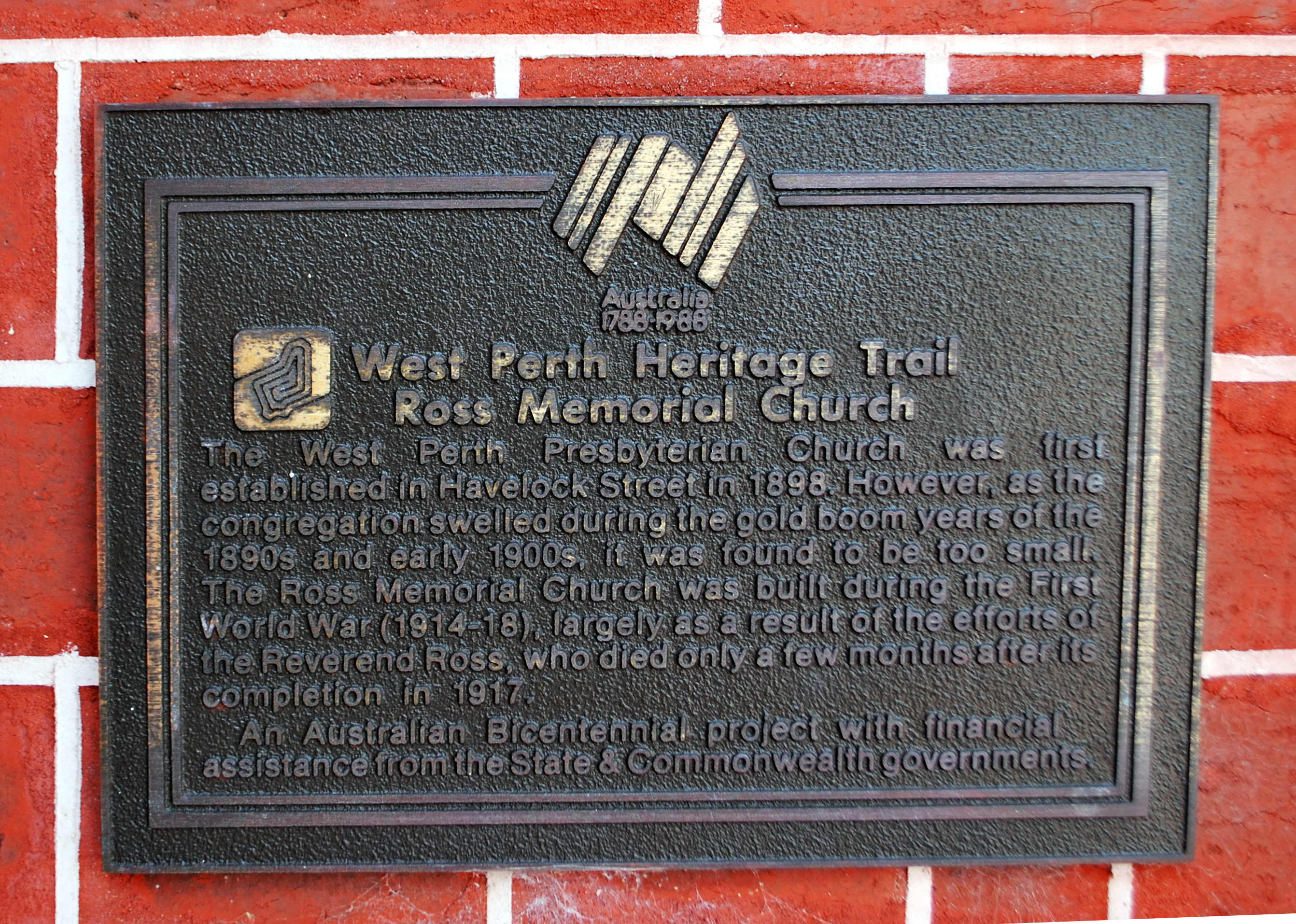
Heritage plaque

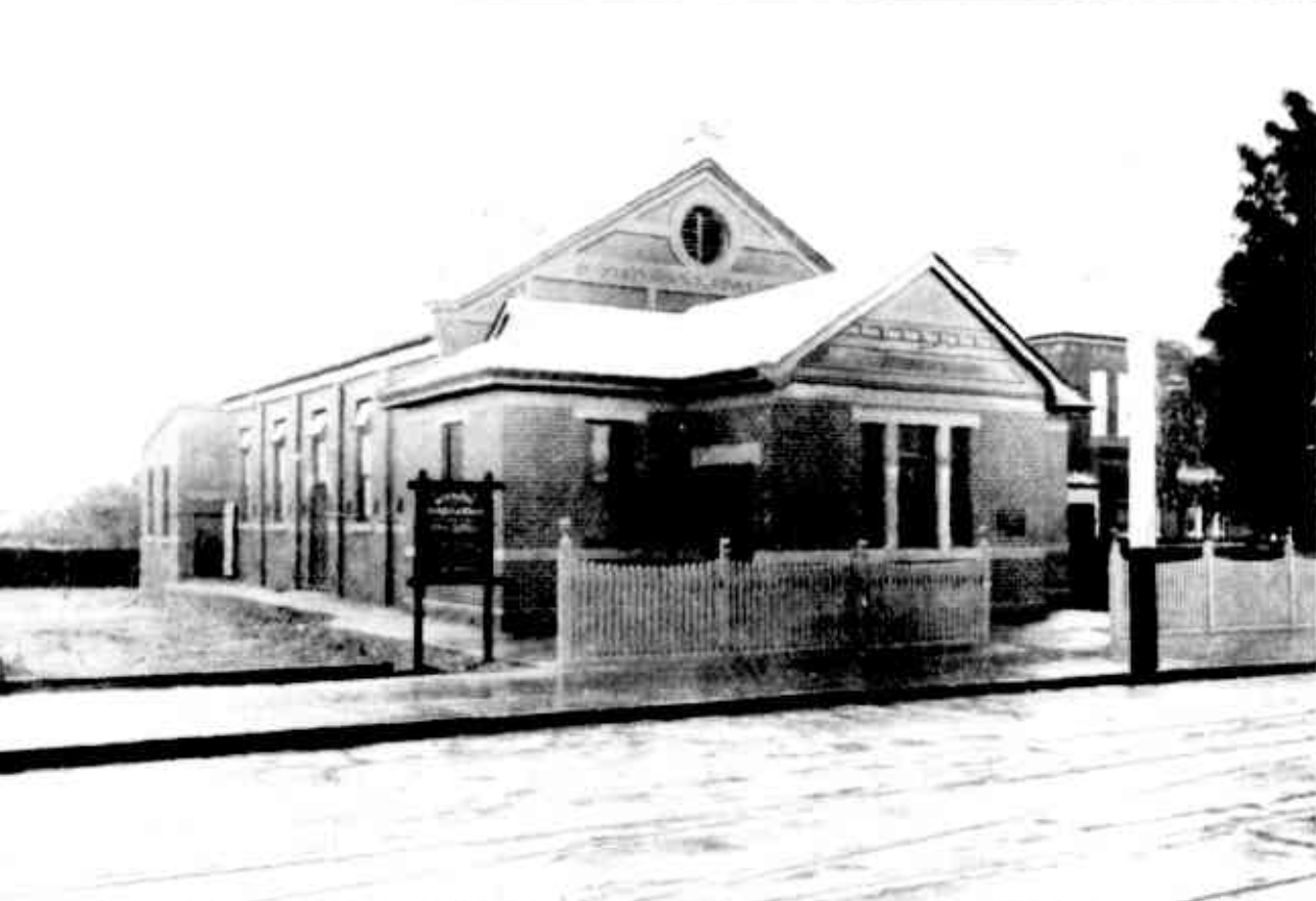
Church hall (east of the church; constructed 1913; now demolished)
