= Victoria Square, Perth =

Grounds of St Mary's Cathedral in Perth, Western Australia

Coordinates: 31.9556°S 115.8665°E

Victoria Square, Perth Western Australia
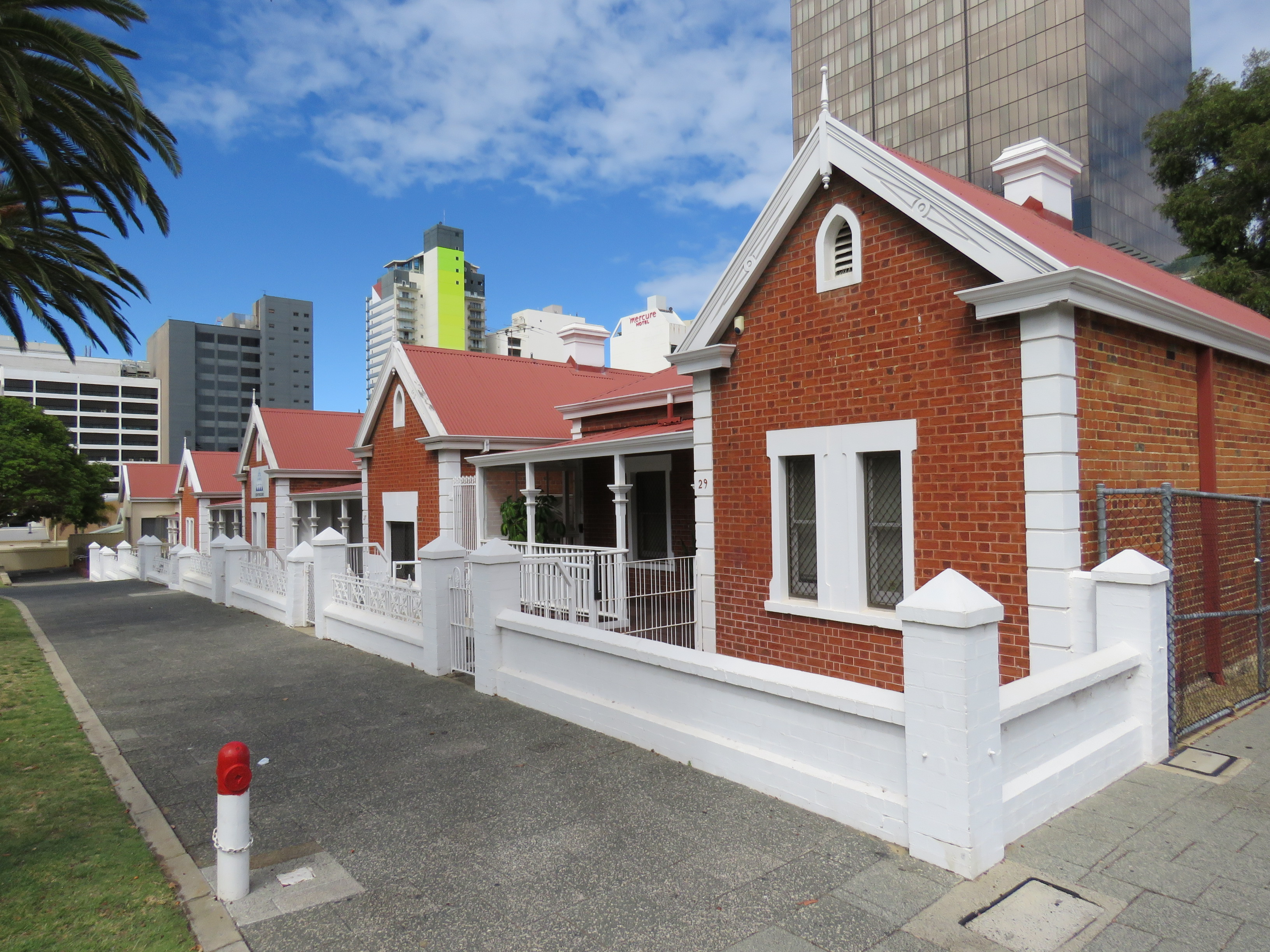
- The state heritage listed Victoria Square Cottages on Victoria Square in January 2021

General information
- Type: Street
- Length: 450 m (0.3 mi)
- Ring road around: St Mary's Cathedral

Major junctions
- From: Goderich Street
- Lord Street; Murray Street; Victoria Avenue
- To: Goderich Street

Location(s)
- Suburb(s): Perth

Victoria Square is the name of the area and road that runs around the edge of the grounds of St Mary's Cathedral in Perth, Western Australia.

It is the northern extension of Victoria Avenue.

The area was originally named Church Hill by John Septimus Roe in 1839 or 1840, but was subsequently known as Victoria Square. The Anglicans of Perth chose the location of their cathedral, St George's, closer to Government House on St Georges Terrace, allowing the Catholic church to utilise Victoria Square.

The precinct that surrounds the area includes historic schools, Catholic Church buildings, as well as historic residential buildings.

Most of the historic buildings in the square were constructed and opened in the late nineteenth century.

Royal Perth Hospital is on its northern side, and related buildings are on the north west side of the square, while on the south east side is Mercedes College. In the nineteenth century, the Convent of Mercy was located on the square.

On the southern and south west part of the square is the Catholic Archbishop's Palace.

The road that leads to the square from the west is Murray Street, while the road leading east is Goderich Street. Lord Street runs from the north east corner of the square, and over Wellington Street and the railway line into Mount Lawley.

== Intersections ==
Victoria Square is a circular one-way road, travelling anticlockwise, which is reflected in the table below.

LGA	Location	km	mi	Destinations	Notes
Perth	Perth	0	0.0	Goderich Street	Stop sign controlled, giving Victoria Square priority
Perth	Perth	0.04	0.025	Lord Street	Lord Street is one-way northbound
Perth	Perth	0.22	0.14	Murray Street	Give way sign controlled, giving Murray Street priority; Murray Street is one-way eastbound; church access is included in intersection
Perth	Perth	0.3	0.19	Victoria Avenue	Give way sign controlled, giving Victoria Avenue priority; Victoria Avenue is one-way northbound
Perth	Perth	0.45	0.28	Goderich Street	Anticlockwise loop completed, refer back to top of table
1.000 mi = 1.609 km; 1.000 km = 0.621 mi

== See also ==
- List of streets in Perth
