= Adelaide Terrace =

Road in Perth, Western Australia

Adelaide Terrace, Perth Western Australia
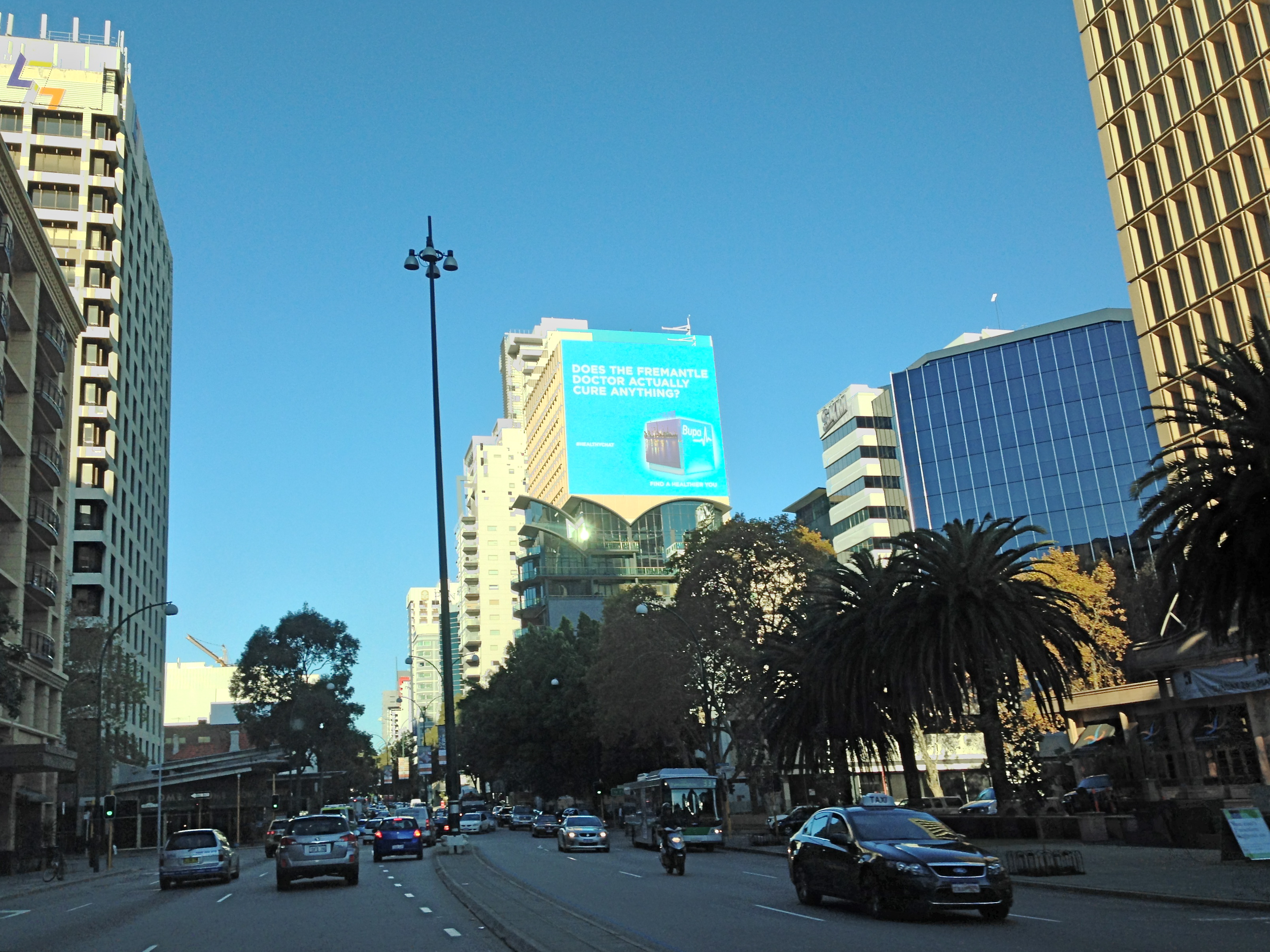
- View down Adelaide Terrace

General information
- Type: Road
- Length: 1.3 km (0.8 mi)

Major junctions
- East end: The Causeway (State Route 5); Riverside Drive (State Route 5); Hay Street
- Plain Street (State Route 65); Bennett Street; Hill Street
- West end: Victoria Avenue; St Georges Terrace

Location(s)
- Major suburbs: East Perth, Perth

Adelaide Terrace is a major arterial road through the central business district of Perth, Western Australia. It runs parallel to the Swan River, linking St Georges Terrace with The Causeway.

== Route description ==
Adelaide Terrace's eastern end is at The Causeway, adjacent to the Swan River. It travels in a west-north-westerly, intersecting perpendicular roads in Perth's grid plan, which are spaced 300 to 400 metres (980 to 1,310 ft) apart. All intersections are traffic light controlled, except for a couple of minor streets. The road's western end joins onto St Georges Terrace, at an intersection with Victoria Avenue.

== History ==
Adelaide Terrace has existed since the 1830s. Its name appears for the first time on maps of the Land Department in 1838. It is named after Queen Adelaide, consort of King William IV, who reigned from 1830 to 1837.

In the late nineteenth century, the southern side was lined by houses and properties of wealthy and powerful people in Western Australia of the time – and it earned the reputation of being the location of some of John Horgan's six hungry families.

By the late twentieth century, there were only a couple of houses from the nineteenth century remaining in the full length of the road.

== Major intersections ==
All major intersections are traffic light controlled and are within the City of Perth.

Location	km	mi	Destinations	Notes
East Perth	0	0.0	The Causeway (State Route 5) southeast / Riverside Drive (State Route 5) southwest / Hay Street northeast – Perth, Victoria Park, Albany.	Eastern terminus at traffic light controlled teardrop roundabout: No access from Hay Street, no access to Riverside Drive.
East Perth	0.3	0.19	De Vlamingh Avenue	
East Perth	0.4	0.25	Plain Street (State Route 65) – Mount Lawley, Maylands, Midland	Traffic light controlled. No right turns permitted from Plain Street during peak hour. Access to Graham Farmer Freeway.
East Perth	0.7	0.43	Bennett Street	Traffic light controlled.
East Perth	0.9	0.56	Burt Way	
East Perth–Perth boundary	1.0	0.62	Hill Street	Traffic light controlled. Traffic cannot access Hill Street northbound due to southbound one-way operation.
Perth	1.3	0.81	Victoria Avenue – Highgate, Mount Lawley	Western terminus, continues as St Georges Terrace westbound. Traffic light controlled. Victoria Avenue is one-way northbound north of intersection.
1.000 mi = 1.609 km; 1.000 km = 0.621 mi: Incomplete access
