= St Brigid's Roman Catholic Church =

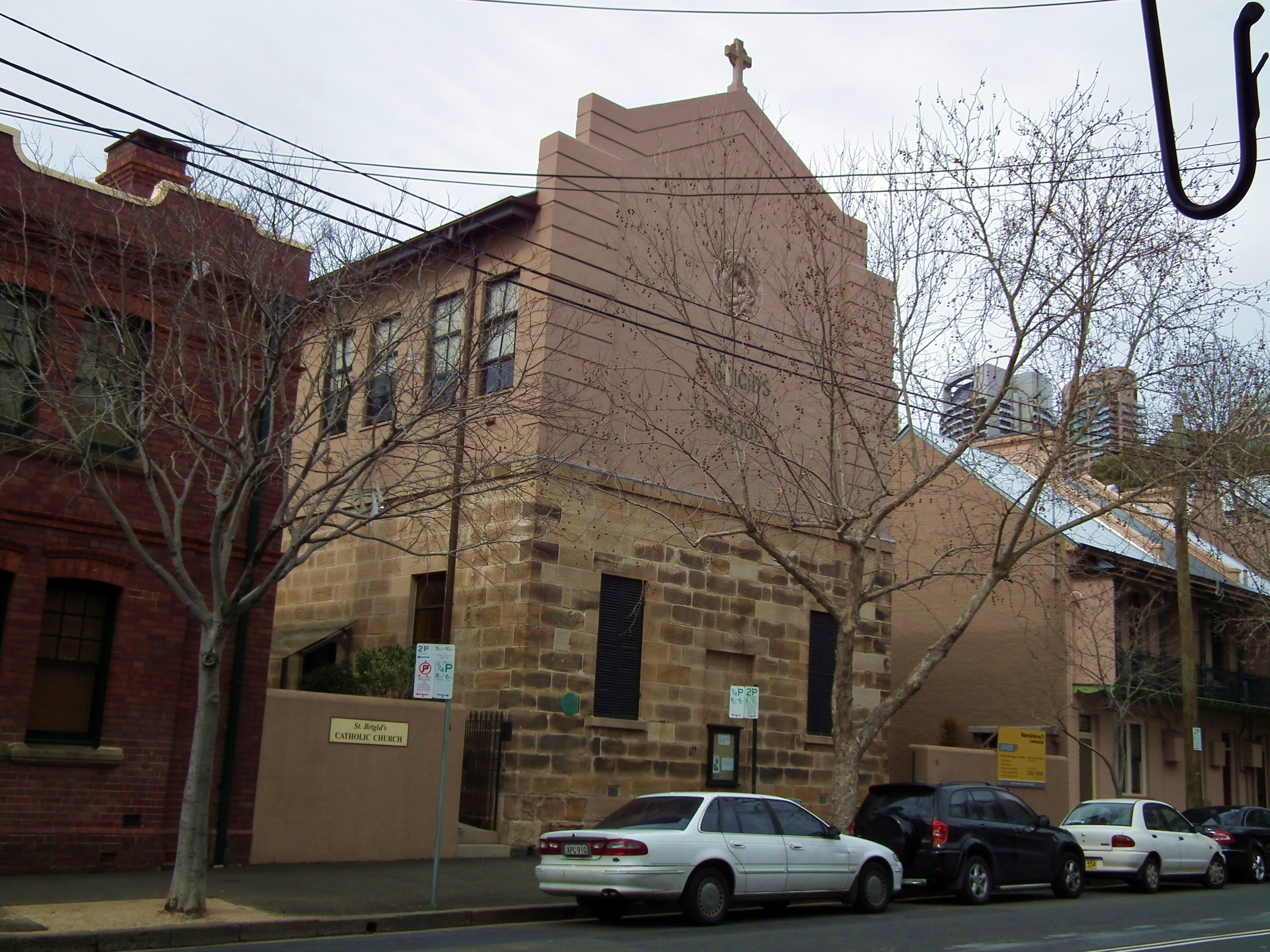
- St Brigid's Roman Catholic Church, and former school in 2012

- Location in Sydney central business district
- 33.8587°S 151.2038°E
- Location: 14, 16 Kent Street, Millers Point, Sydney, New South Wales
- Country: Australia
- Denomination: Catholic
- Website: stpatschurchhill.org/st-brigids-beginning/

History
- Status: Active
- Founder: Bishop Dr William Bernard Ullathorne OSB

Architecture
- Functional status: Church
- Architect: Ambrose Hallen
- Years built: 1834–1835

Administration
- Archdiocese: Sydney
- Parish: St Patrick's Roman Catholic Church, Sydney

New South Wales Heritage Register
- Official name: St. Brigid's Roman Catholic Church & School; St Brigid's; St Bridget’s
- Type: State heritage (built)
- Designated: 2 April 1999
- Reference no.: 645
- Type: Church
- Category: Religion

St Brigid's Roman Catholic Church is a heritage-listed Roman Catholic church building located at 14, 16 Kent Street, in the inner city Sydney suburb of Millers Point, New South Wales, Australia. It is also known as St. Brigid's Roman Catholic Church & School, St Brigid's, and St Bridget's. The property is owned by Saint Brigid's Roman Catholic Church. It was added to the New South Wales State Heritage Register on 2 April 1999.

St Brigid's Church is the oldest surviving place of Catholic worship in Australia.

== History ==
The Roman Catholic Church was not formally recognised in Australia until 1820 with the arrival of Fathers Connolly and Therry, although unofficial churches and schools are believed to have operated in the colony prior to that time. St Brigid's is typical of the early development of educational facilities in New South Wales, which were either privately operated or church run. State run schools did not come into being until the National School system began in the 1840s. St Brigid's is believed to be the oldest church run school surviving in New South Wales (predating the Catholic school at Camperdown by five years).

The original design of St Brigid's, established as St Bridget's, has been attributed to Bishop Dr William Bernard Ullathorne OSB. It was originally designed as a single storey sandstone building containing a classroom and a separate chapel. Construction commenced in 1834, using “stone which is close at hand”. The single storey building was completed in April 1835. The completed building was handed over in May 1835 and was put into use immediately. A partition of folding doors divided the interior in half, providing separate class-rooms for the boys and girls. On Sundays, the school doubled as a chapel for Mass.

Pupils were initially under the care of the Christian Brothers, but by the 1870s the school had been taken over by the Sisters of Mercy. In the early 1930s Father Daniel Hurley, Parish Priest of St Patrick's, sought and gained permission to build another storey on top of the original classroom and chapel. The original sandstone classroom and chapel were converted to the church and apse visible today. The extended school was opened on 31 August 1933.

In 1933 an upper storey was added to St Bridget's, and at that time the present spelling (St Brigid's) came to be adopted. The upper storey construction allowed the original ground floor building to be used exclusively as a chapel. In 1992 the school closed because of falling enrolments. Restoration work commenced during 2002 and 2003 for maintenance and conservation of the interior and exterior historic chapel.

== Description ==
The site lies on the west facing slope of Observatory Hill, a sandstone bluff which separates Sydney Cove from Darling Harbour.

=== Condition ===
As at 23 April 2003, a detailed archaeological research design report was prepared and submitted with the Section 60 application as required by the General Terms of Approval issued by the Heritage Council on 13 June 2002.

According to the archaeological research design report, until 1833 the whole site was part of an extensive sandstone quarry; then, in May 1835, the church building was completed and opened as a school. It is possible that artefacts related to the school were deposited in the southern yard from this time. In about 1935 the second storey was built into the church for use as the school, so that the ground floor room could be devoted exclusively to use as a church. During these building works and improvements, the level of the southern yard was raised with a new bitumen surface. This would have sealed in any earlier archaeological remains from the use of the area as the yard for the school and its sometime use as a church.

In summary, the archaeological research design report concludes that the southern yard, which is to be excavated as a result of the proposed works, is not of high archaeological significance.

== Heritage listing ==
As at 23 April 2003, St Brigid's Church and School is of State significance because:

- it is the oldest building in Australasia in continuous use for religious services for the Roman Catholic faith. The ground floor sandstone section, which still functions as a church, has been in use since 1835 (Grading of Significance: Exceptional);
- the site has strong associations with Bishop Ullathorne (the first senior Catholic churchman to function in Australia) who was instrumental in placing the Church on a formal footing in New South Wales (Grading of Significance: Exceptional);
- the building is one of the few surviving works by the Colonial Architect Ambrose Hallen (Grading of Significance: High); and
- the building makes a visual contribution to the local historic precinct, which is recognised as being of national significance (Grading of Significance: High).

St Brigid's Church and School documents the religious and educational life of the local society over an exceptional length of time and may have special significance for the history of the Roman Catholic community in Australia.

St Brigid's Roman Catholic Church & School was listed on the New South Wales State Heritage Register on 2 April 1999.

== See also ==
- Roman Catholicism in Australia
