= Victoria Avenue, Perth =

Street in the CBD of Perth, Western Australia

Victoria Avenue, Perth Western Australia

General information
- Type: Street
- Length: 550 m (0.3 mi)

Major junctions
- South end: Riverside Drive State Route 5
- St Georges Terrace, Adelaide Terrace
- North end: Victoria Square

Location(s)
- Suburb(s): Perth

Victoria Avenue is a street in the central business district of Perth, Western Australia.

At the northern end of Victoria Avenue is Victoria Square enclosing St Mary's Cathedral.

South from Victoria Square, it crosses Hay Street, and is the point where St Georges Terrace and Adelaide Terrace meet. It continues south to Riverside Drive next to the Swan River.

Victoria Avenue is frequently used in the annual Channel 7 Christmas Pageant.

== Buildings ==
St John's Pro-Cathedral is on the eastern side just north of the Hay Street intersection.

On the corner of Victoria Avenue and St Georges Terrace, a school named Christian Brothers College existed. It was located at that site until 1961, when it was demolished. The site is currently occupied by the Duxton Hotel.

== Intersections ==
All except Victoria Square are controlled by traffic lights.

Location	km	mi	Destinations	Notes
Perth	0.0	0.0	Victoria Square	Northern terminus; Continuing traffic must turn right but is free-flowing.
Perth	0.075	0.047	Hay Street	Hay Street is one-way westbound east of Victoria Avenue.
Perth	0.21	0.13	St Georges Terrace westbound / Adelaide Terrace eastbound – Kings Park, West Perth, Subiaco, Victoria Park	Victoria Avenue converts from one-way northbound to two-way southbound.
Perth	0.4	0.25	Terrace Road	
Perth	0.55	0.34	Riverside Drive (State Route 5) – Kings Park, Fremantle, Victoria Park	Southern terminus.
1.000 mi = 1.609 km; 1.000 km = 0.621 mi: Incomplete access
