= Murray Street, Perth =

Street in CBD of Perth, Western Australia

Murray Street, Perth Western Australia
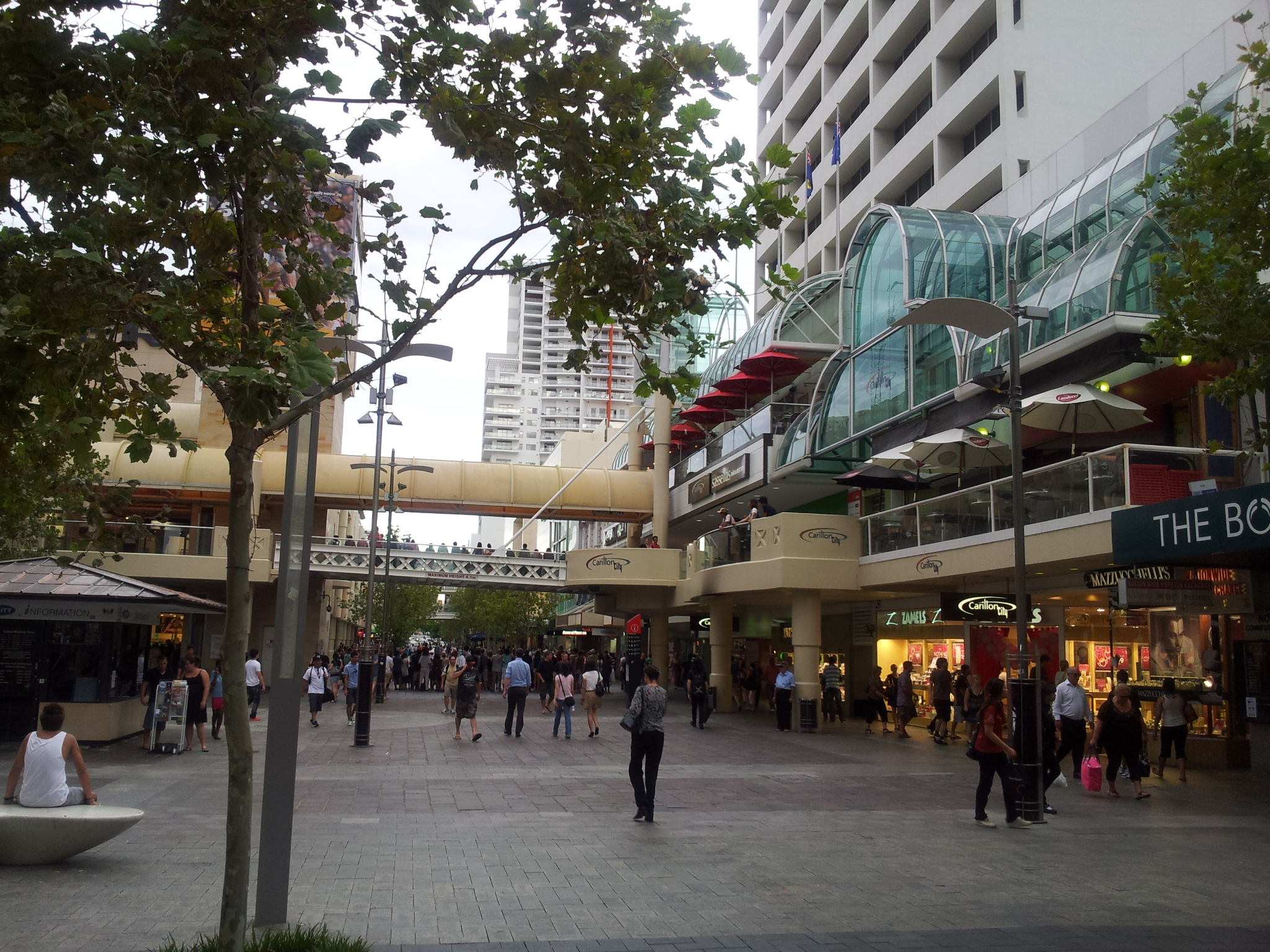
- View along the pedestrian mall in the direction of Carillon City and Barrack Street in January 2012
- Coordinates: 31°56′46″S 115°50′19″E (West end); 31°57′19″S 115°51′57″E (East end)

General information
- Type: Street
- Length: 2.8 km (1.7 mi)

Major junctions
- West end: Thomas Street (State Routes 61 and 65)
- Mitchell Freeway (State Route 2); William Street (State Route 53); Barrack Street (State Route 53)
- East end: Victoria Square

Location(s)
- Suburb(s): West Perth, Perth

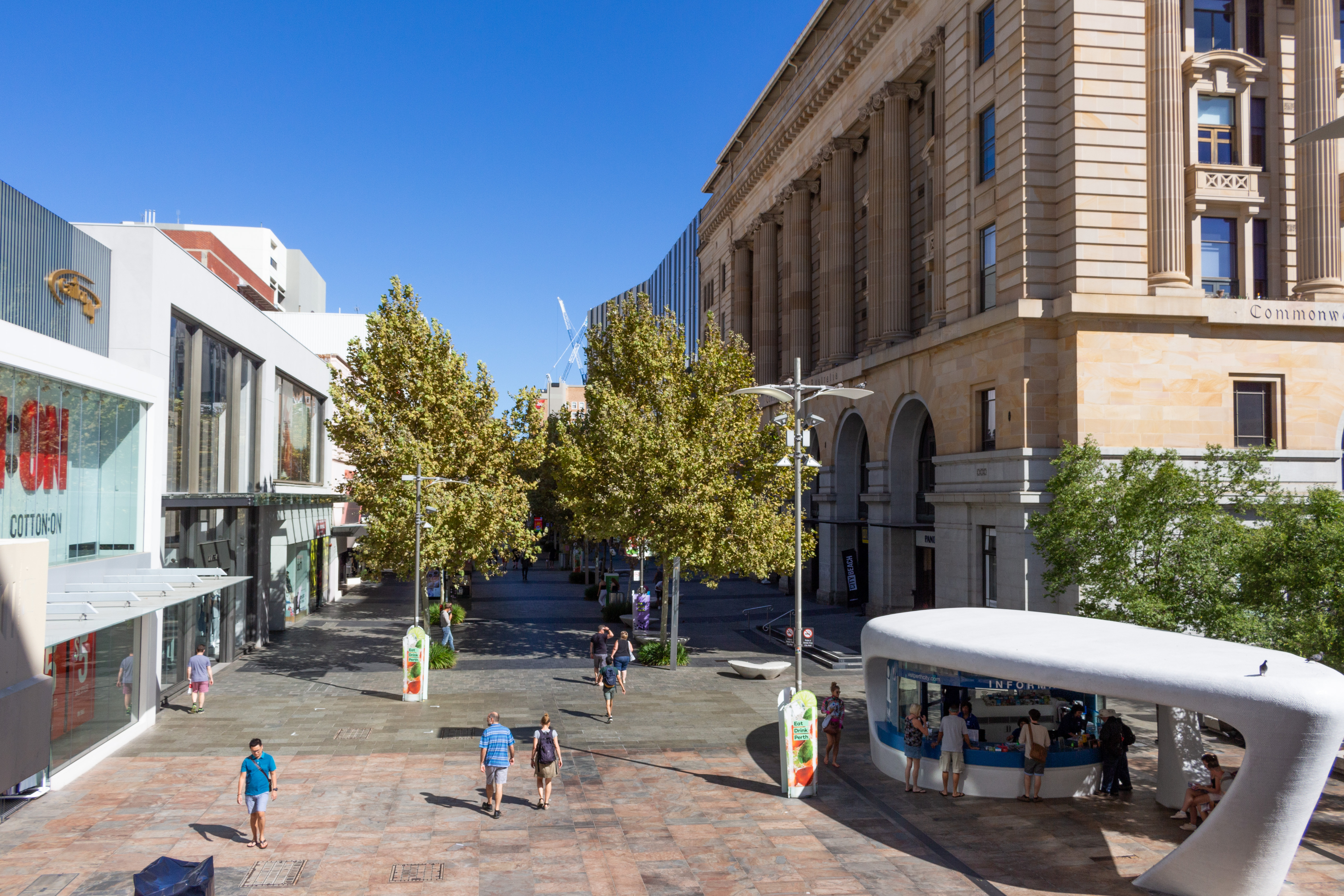
The Commonwealth Bank building (right) stands at the corner of Murray Street and Forrest Place

Murray Street is one of four main east-west streets within the Perth central business district (CBD).

== History ==
Murray Street was named after George Murray, Secretary of State for War and the Colonies from 1828 to 1830.

It is the one main street in Perth that has an eastern ending at a church – the Roman Catholic St Mary's Cathedral; the other major churches in the CBD are on the sides of the city streets. The western end of Murray Street also once had a church with St Patrick's Roman Catholic Church sitting at Havelock Street opposite the end of Murray Street. Murray Street was extended to Outram Street in 1937. St Patrick's was then demolished. Murray Street was later extended further west to Thomas Street.

The intersections with the north-south running streets include Murray Street, where the Wentworth Hotel has been on the corner for over 100 years, though the earlier hotel at the location had a different name.

The central portion between Barrack and William streets has been converted into a pedestrian mall. In 2005, the mall was refreshed in connection with the building of a new entrance to Perth railway station.

The mall was created later than the Hay Street mall and its central section had no hotels whereas Wellington, Hay and St Georges Terrace have.

The number of historic arcades linking with the Hay Street mall is significant compared to other parts of the CBD.

The western and eastern ends of the street have had significant changes in land use compared to the central section.

== Shops and malls ==
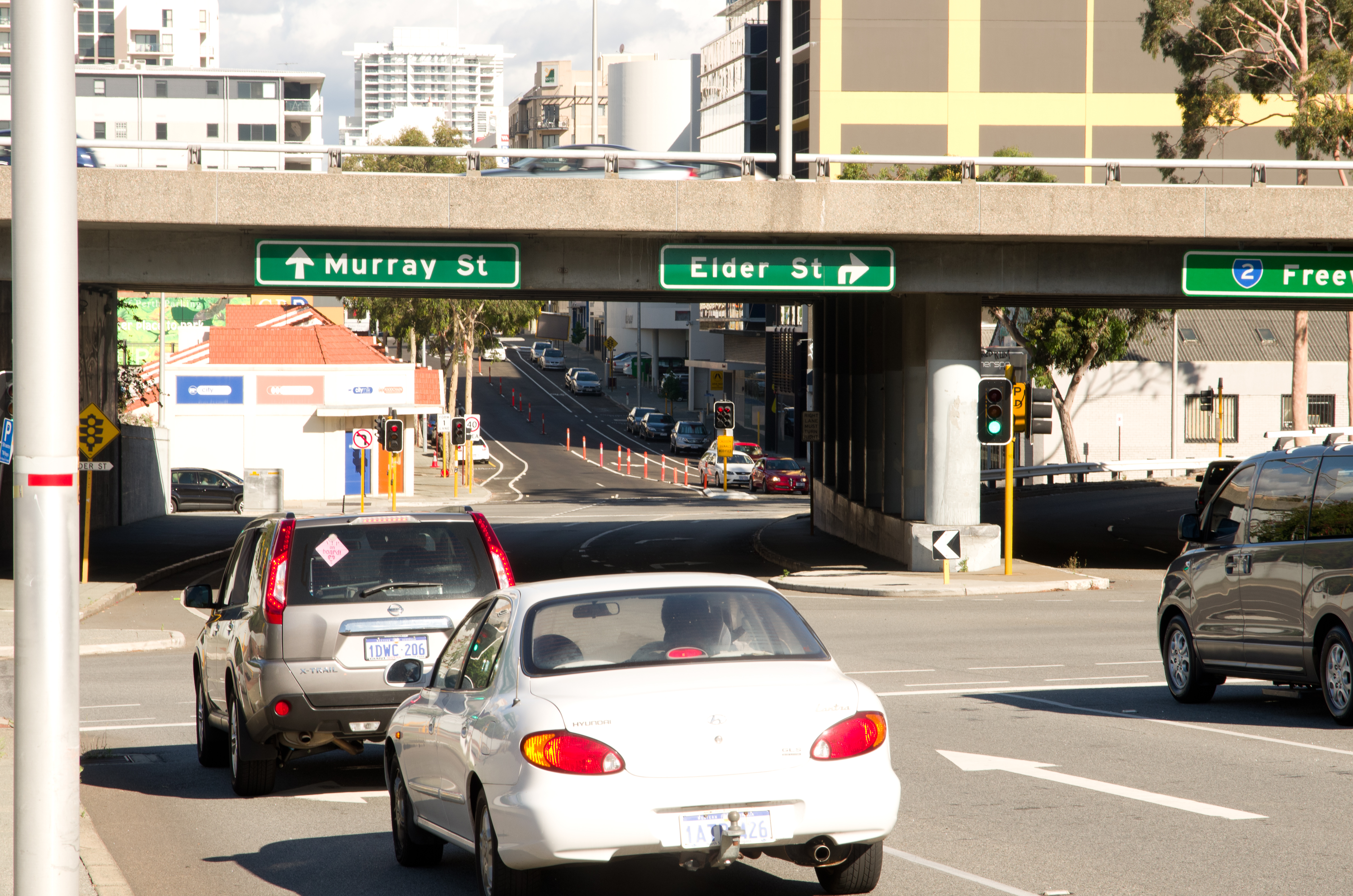
Corner of Murray and Elder streets

The strip has many popular shops lining the street including flagship outlets for department stores such as Myer, David Jones, Woolworths and Kmart. Recent development along Murray Street has seen the addition of a number of both national and international retailers including – Nespresso, Swarovski, G-Star Raw, Quiksilver, General Pants Co., Aquilla, Industrie, Hurley, Pandora, Zara and many more.

== East Precinct ==
The Murray Street East Precinct includes the heritage listed area between Pier Street and Victoria Square. Notable buildings/features within the heritage precinct include;

- Young Australia League Building and House, a three storey rendered masonry and concrete building in the Inter-War Free Classical style (45 Murray Street) and adjacent two storey rendered and painted brick and iron roof house in the Federation Queen Anne style (55 Murray Street), has cultural heritage significance for the following reasons: the place has been associated with the activities of the Young Australia League from the time of purchase by the League in 1920/1921 and is associated with the founder of the Young Australia League, Jack Simons, and with other prominent West Australians who were members of the organisation including State Premier Sir Walter James and prominent architect Lionel Boas whose architectural firm Oldham Boas was responsible for the design of the Young Australia League Building. It is also associated with the thousands of young people who took part in the programmes of the League; the Young Australia League Building is representative of the Young Australia League philosophy and a way of life based on the expression of Australian nationalism and has been associated with the development of youth organisations in Australia and overseas; the Young Australia League building is a rare example of the Inter-War Free Classical style enhanced by an unusual facade with a two-storey colonnade, semi-enclosed court and strong vertical detailing; the house, currently home to PHC Projects Management Consultants, is a simple example of a two storey late nineteenth century residential building, is the only residential style building in the Murray Street East Precinct and a rare example of a substantial late nineteenth century house in central Perth; the house was the home of a prominent member of the Roman Catholic community, philanthropist, property investor and politician Timothy Quinlan who, together with his father-in-law, Daniel Connor, invested in significant land holdings in central Perth which became known as the Connor-Quinlan Estate; the place forms an important component of the Murray Street East Precinct, which extends from Pier Street to Victoria Square, and the Young Australia League Building defines the corner of Murray Street and Irwin Street.
- Former Government Printing Office Building (78 Murray Street), now the Curtin Graduate School of Business.

== West Precinct ==
Historically, the western end of Murray Street terminated at Havelock Street. In 1937, the street was extended west to Outram Street, and it was later extended further west to its current terminus at Thomas Street, marking the boundary between West Perth and Subiaco. The western section of Murray Street, encompassing the broader West End Precinct, reflects the city's transition from early industrial and residential uses to a modern commercial hub.

Notable buildings/features within the western precinct include;

- No. 2 Substation, a utilitarian building designed in the Federation Free Classical style (132 Murray Street). Constructed between 1914 and 1915 by the Perth City Council, it was a vital part of Perth's first centralised electricity supply network and operated in conjunction with the East Perth Power Station.
- Murray Mews (325–331 Murray Street), an arcade of shops, galleries, and a pedestrian walkway. Originally a collection of late 19th and early 20th-century warehouses and factories clustered around a back alleyway, it is a rare surviving example of the city's past industrial history.
- Magnet House (building) (393 Murray Street), an Inter-War Functionalist style building opened in 1936. Designed by architects Hobbs, Forbes and partners as a purpose-built showroom for the British General Electric Company, it has housed several entertainment venues over the decades.
- W. D. & H. O. Wills Warehouse (474 Murray Street), a three-storey commercial, rendered brick building with a reinforced concrete structure. Constructed in 1926/27 at the corner of Murray and Milligan Streets, it is a prominent example of the Inter-War Chicagoesque architectural style and has since been adapted for residential use as the Home Apartments.

== Access ==
The Murray Street mall is directly connected to Perth railway station by an entry at the west end of the mall, and via Forrest Place to the original Perth railway station and the Museum of Western Australia. Parking garages are also located nearby.

== Major intersections ==
| LGA | Location | km | mi | Destinations | Notes |
|---|---|---|---|---|---|
| Perth–Subiaco boundary | West Perth–Subiaco boundary | 0 | 0.0 | Thomas Street (State Routes 61 and 65) | Murray Street is one-way eastbound |
| Perth | West Perth | 0.21 | 0.13 | Outram Street | Traffic light controlled |
| Perth | West Perth | 0.45 | 0.28 | Colin Street | Traffic light controlled |
| Perth | West Perth | 0.65 | 0.40 | Havelock Street | Traffic light controlled |
| Perth | West Perth | 1.1 | 0.68 | George Street | Traffic light controlled; George Street is one-way northbound and has slip road to freeway ramp |
| Perth | Perth–West Perth boundary | 1.1 | 0.68 | Mitchell Freeway (State Route 2) | Freeway southbound entry ramp only; ramp also contains slip roads from George Street and Elder Street |
| Perth | Perth | 1.2 | 0.75 | Elder Street | Traffic light controlled; Elder Street is one-way southbound and has slip road to freeway ramp; Murray Street is two-way east of intersection |
| Perth | Perth | 1.4 | 0.87 | Milligan Street | Traffic light controlled |
| Perth | Perth | 1.9 | 1.2 | William Street (State Route 53) | Traffic light controlled |
Murray Street Mall
| Perth | Perth | 2.3 | 1.4 | Barrack Street (State Route 53) | Traffic light controlled; Murray Street is two-way east of intersection |
| Perth | Perth | 2.5 | 1.6 | Pier Street | Traffic light controlled; Pier Street south of intersection is one-way southbound |
| Perth | Perth | 2.6 | 1.6 | Irwin Street | Irwin Street is one-way northbound; Murray Street becomes one-way east of intersection |
| Perth | Perth | 2.8 | 1.7 | Victoria Square | Traffic circle: anticlockwise flow, circulating traffic gives way to entering traffic |
1.000 mi = 1.609 km; 1.000 km = 0.621 mi: Incomplete access
