= St John's Pro-Cathedral =

Roman Catholic building in Perth, Western Australia

- Church of St John the Apostle and Evangelist
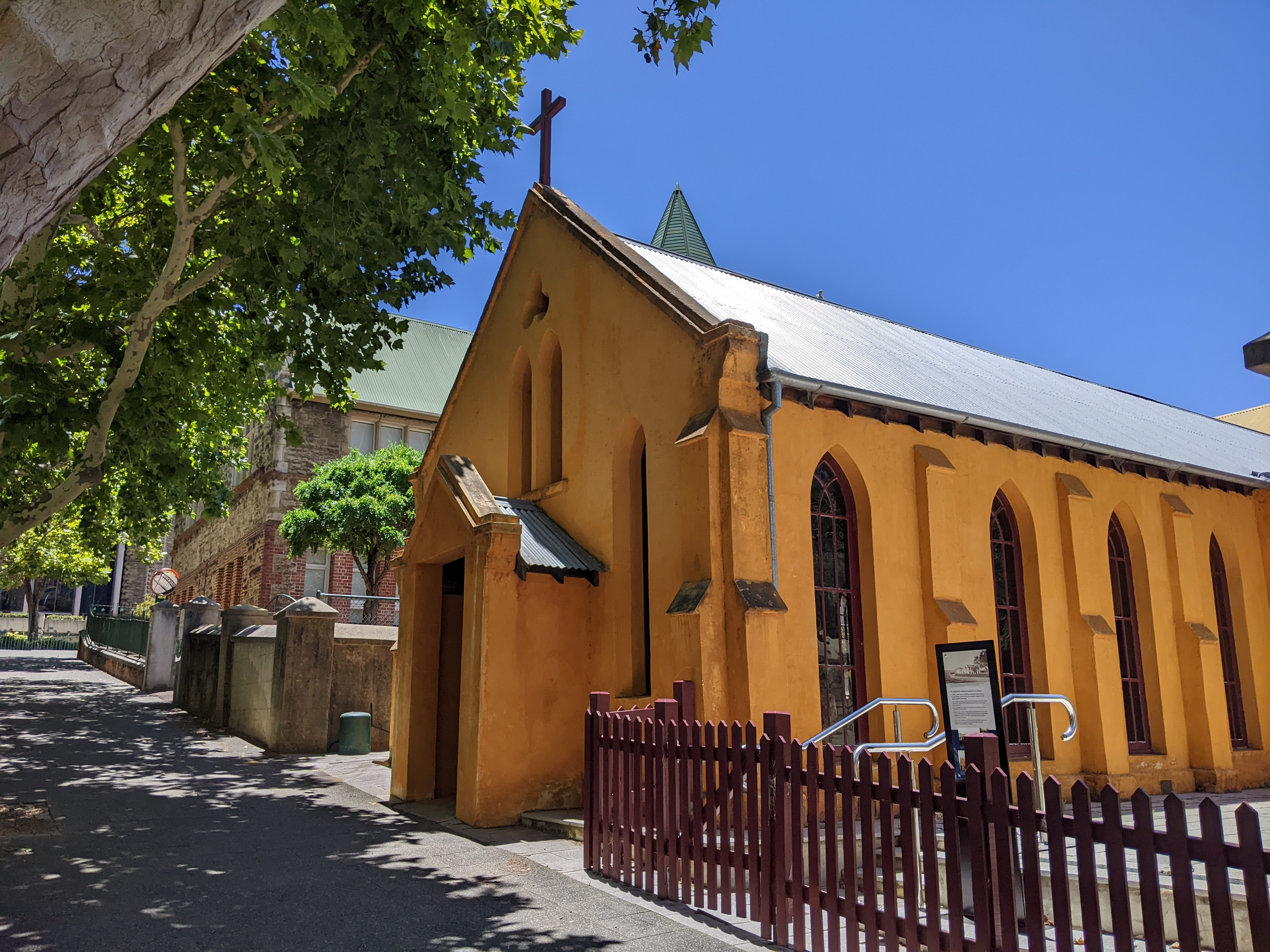
- St John's Pro-Cathedral, Perth in 2024
- St John's Pro-Cathedral
- 31.956283°S 115.866198°E
- Address: 18 Victoria Avenue, Perth, Western Australia
- Country: Australia
- Denomination: Catholic Church

History
- Status: Church (1844 – 1846); Cathedral (1846 – 1865); Pro-Cathedral (1881 – 1881; Chapel (1881 – 1965); Classroom (1965 – c. 1979); Museum (c. 1980 – )
- Founded: 16 January 1844
- Founder: Father John Brady
- Consecrated: January 1846 as a Cathedral

Architecture
- Architectural type: Gothic Revival

Western Australia Heritage Register
- Type: State Registered Place
- Designated: 10 October 1995
- Reference no.: 2130

St John's Pro-Cathedral is located at 18 Victoria Avenue in Perth, Western Australia. It is the earliest Roman Catholic church building in Western Australia.

== Built form ==
The building is constructed of brick that has been covered with lime render and painted ochre to resemble the colour of the original building. The gable roof is covered with shingles. The north and south facades are punctuated by arched windows. Buttresses have been placed at regular intervals down the length of these facades. The portico, which was removed in 1881, has been reconstructed at the western end of the building. The western gable end is punctuated by four arched windows, a pair above the portico and a single window on either side of the portico. A lean-to extension is located at the eastern end of the southern facade. Entry to this section is through an arched door on the north facade. The church windows have clear glass set in wooden mullions. Those in the lean-to section are square, four-paned windows.

== History ==
The pro-cathedral of St John the Evangelist is an important building in the history of the Catholic Church in Western Australia. It was the first Catholic Church and would become the first cathedral. It was the centre of Catholic life for the first twenty years of the Catholic Church in the Swan River Colony until the first St Mary’s Cathedral was completed in 1865.

In 1843 approval for the request was granted from the Vatican, and Father John Brady, Father John Joostens (a Belgian priest) and Patrick O'Reilly (a catechist) soon arrived in Fremantle on the ship Water Witch. Even though Brady was to stay in Perth for only two months, he was able to claim a land grant for the church on Victoria Avenue. This was to be the site of the first Catholic cathedral, the Church of St John the Apostle and Evangelist (St John's Pro-Cathedral). Construction commenced on 27 December 1843, with the foundation stone laid on 16 January 1844. In 1844 Brady left for Rome to ask for assistance and advocate the establishment of a new diocese for the Swan River Colony.

Following Brady's arrival, as bishop, back in Perth in January 1846, the Church of St John the Apostle and Evangelist became a cathedral as it was now the seat of a bishop. The chair that Brady brought from Europe still remains in the pro-cathedral. Brady left Perth in 1852, following disputes with the Apostolic Administrator, Joseph Serra. In 1850, Serra replaced Brady as Bishop of Perth and in 1855 he extended the building in brick to twice its original size. The church was rededicated as the Immaculate Conception. In 1856, a brick portico was added to the western side of the building.

St John's Pro-Cathedral was the principal place of worship for the Roman Catholic community in Perth from 1844 until 1865. Upon its completion in 1865 the Gothic-style St Mary's Cathedral replaced St John's as Perth's Catholic cathedral. The church then became known as St John's Pro-Cathedral and was used by the Christian Brothers as a school.

In 1881, St John's Pro-Cathedral was renovated and used by the Sisters of Mercy, under the name of St John's Chapel, as the school chapel for Mercedes College. In 1965, the building was modernised and used as a classroom for convent students and for external students studying English.

Between 1979 and 1980, work was undertaken to restore the building and remove the additions and alterations, which were unsympathetic to the original design. The buildings were then adapted for use as a museum by the Catholic Church.

== Heritage value ==
The building is registered with the National Trust, State Register of Heritage Places, the now defunct Register of the National Estate, and is on the City of Perth's Municipal Heritage Inventory.

In accordance with the Heritage Council of Western Australia's assessment the Cathedral has cultural heritage significance for the following reasons:

- it is the first and the oldest Roman Catholic church in Western Australia;
- the place is associated with the establishment of the Roman Catholic Church and the first religious orders in the state; and,
- the place is held in high regard by present-day Catholics.
