= Hay Street, Perth =

Street in Perth, Western Australia

Hay Street, Perth Western Australia
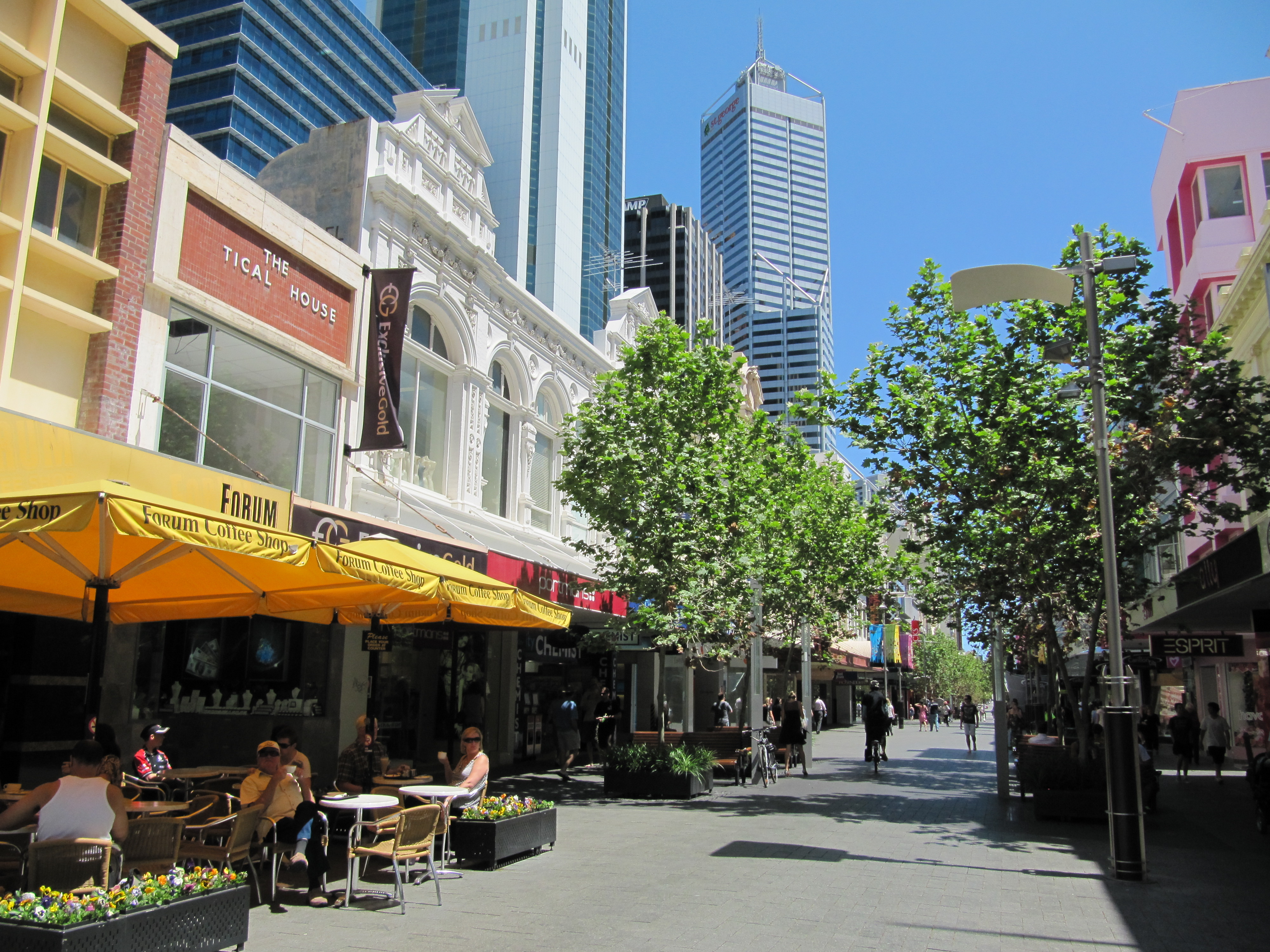
- Hay Street Mall, the pedestrian mall between Barrack and William streets

General information
- Type: Street
- Length: 7.6 km (4.7 mi)
- Route number(s): State Route 65 (Subiaco, Jolimont)

Major junctions
- East end: The Causeway (State Route 5); Adelaide Terrace; Riverside Drive (State Route 5)
- Plain Street (State Route 65); Barrack Street (State Route 53); William Street (State Route 53); Mitchell Freeway (State Route 2); Thomas Street (State Routes 61 and 65); Railway Road/Roberts Road (State Route 65)
- West end: Underwood Avenue (State Route 65); Selby Street (State Route 64)

Location(s)
- Suburb(s): East Perth, Perth CBD, West Perth, Subiaco, Jolimont

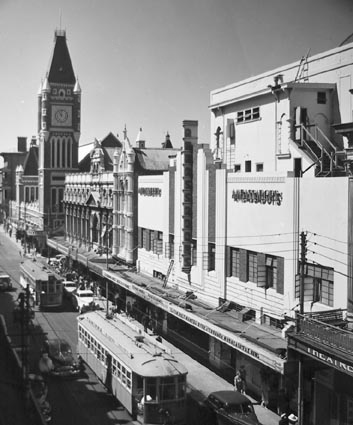
Trams in Hay Street in 1949, Perth Town Hall is on the left

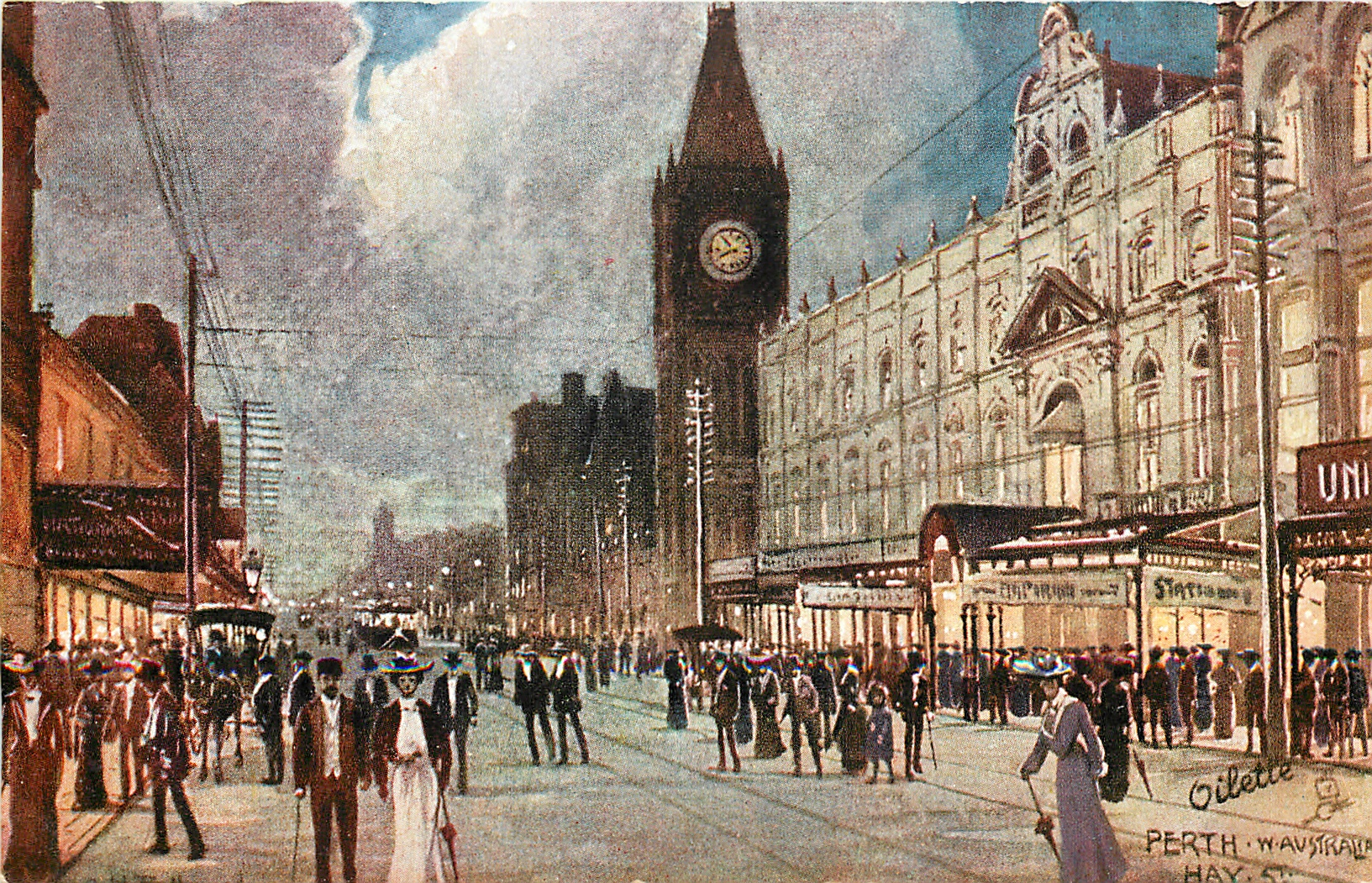
Hay Street 1911/12 by Albert Henry Fullwood

Hay Street is a major road through the Perth central business district, Western Australia and adjacent suburbs. The street was named after Robert Hay, the Permanent Under Secretary for Colonies. Sections of the road were called Howick Street (Note: Named after Earl Grey Viscount Howick) and Twiss Street (Note: Named after Horace Twiss, Under Secretary of State) until 1897. One block in the central business section is now a pedestrian mall with extremely limited vehicular traffic, so that it is necessary to make a significant detour in order to drive the entire length of Hay Street.

== Route description ==
Orientated east-west, the road starts at The Causeway travelling west through the suburbs of East Perth, Perth, West Perth, and Subiaco, where the road originally terminated at Subiaco. Unusually, the street numbers reset to 1 when Hay Street crosses Thomas Street and enters Subiaco.

A subway under the Fremantle railway line was constructed in the early 1900s, replaced when the railway line was moved underground through Subiaco in 1999. From that point it becomes Underwood Avenue through Jolimont, Floreat (past Perry Lakes) and ends in Swanbourne.

== Buildings ==
A number of buildings are along the road, including:

- Gledden Building
- His Majesty's Theatre
- London Court
- Melbourne Hotel
- Perth Town Hall
- City of Perth Library
- Carillon City
- Piccadilly Theatre and Arcade
- Plaza Theatre
- QV1
- Regal Theatre
- Ross Memorial Church
- St Georges Hall
- Subiaco Hotel
- Walsh's Building

== History ==
In 2024, the City of Perth commenced work on converting Hay Street back to a two-way street between Bennett Street and Victoria Avenue.

=== Pedestrian mall ===
The Hay Street pedestrian mall was the earliest conversion from street to mall in Perth, introduced in 1972, despite the road being a major thoroughfare. Through traffic was initially diverted to either Murray Street or St Georges Terrace.

=== Cathedral Square ===
Hay Street between Pier and Barrack streets defines the northern boundary of a block, that has evolved in name from the Cathedral precinct to Cathedral Square, in which the Perth Town Hall, and the City of Perth Library are situated on the Hay Street side of the square.

== Major intersections ==
LGA	Location	km	mi	Destinations	Notes
Perth	East Perth	0	0.0	Riverside Drive (State Route 5) / Adelaide Terrace / The Causeway (State Route 5)	Traffic light controlled teardrop roundabout: no access to Riverside Drive or Adelaide Terrace.
Perth	East Perth	0.15	0.093	Braithwaite Street / Trinity Avenue	Traffic light controlled; no right turn from Hay Street northbound to Trinity Avenue
Perth	East Perth	0.35	0.22	Hale Street / Erskine Link	Traffic light controlled
Perth	East Perth	0.65	0.40	Plain Street (State Route 65)	Traffic light controlled; no right turns from Plain Street
Perth	East Perth	1	0.62	Bennett Street	Traffic light controlled; Hay Street becomes one-way westbound west of intersection
Perth	East Perth–Perth boundary	1.3	0.81	Hill Street	Traffic light controlled; Hill Street is one-way southbound
Perth	Perth	1.6	0.99	Victoria Avenue	Traffic light controlled; Victoria Avenue is one-way northbound
Perth	Perth	1.8	1.1	Irwin Street	Traffic light controlled; Irwin Street consists of two staggered one-way roads (north is northbound only, south is southbound only); Hay Street becomes two-way west of intersection
Perth	Perth	2	1.2	Pier Street	Traffic light controlled; Pier Street north of intersection is one-way southbound
Perth	Perth	2.2	1.4	Barrack Street (State Route 53)	Traffic light controlled; no left turn from Barrack Street southbound to Hay Street
Hay Street Mall
Perth	Perth	2.5	1.6	William Street (State Route 53)	Traffic light controlled; Hay Street is one-way westbound west of intersection
Perth	Perth	3	1.9	Milligan Street	Traffic light controlled
Perth	Perth	3.3	2.1	Elder Street	Traffic light controlled; Elder Street is one-way southbound
Perth	Perth–West Perth boundary	3.3	2.1	Mitchell Freeway (State Route 2)	Freeway northbound exit ramp only; ramp continues after traffic lights as George Street
Perth	West Perth	3.4	2.1	George Street	Traffic light controlled; George Street is one-way northbound and continues from freeway ramp
Perth	West Perth	3.5	2.2	Harvest Terrace	Harvest Terrace is one-way northbound north of intersection; slip road from Hay Street to Harvest Terrace southbound south of intersection
Perth	West Perth	3.8	2.4	Havelock Street	Traffic light controlled
Perth	West Perth	4	2.5	Colin Street	Traffic light controlled
Perth	West Perth	4.2	2.6	Outram Street	Traffic light controlled
Perth–Subiaco boundary	West Perth–Subiaco boundary	4.5	2.8	Thomas Street (State Routes 61 and 65)	Traffic light controlled; State Route 65 westbound concurrency terminus
Subiaco	Subiaco	5.3	3.3	Townshend Road	Traffic light controlled
Subiaco	Subiaco	5.7	3.5	Rokeby Road	Traffic light controlled
Subiaco	Subiaco–Daglish boundary	6.1	3.8	Roberts Road (State Route 65) / Railway Road	Traffic light controlled; State Route 65 eastbound concurrency terminus; Hay Street is two-way west of intersection
Subiaco	Subiaco–Daglish boundary	6.3	3.9	Stubbs Terrace / Mouritzen Way	Traffic light controlled
Subiaco	Jolimont	6.9	4.3	Jersey Street	Traffic light controlled
Subiaco–Nedlands–Cambridge tripoint	Jolimont–Shenton Park–Floreat tripoint	7.6	4.7	Underwood Avenue (State Route 65) / Selby Street (State Route 64)	Traffic light controlled; Hay Street continues west as Underwood Avenue
1.000 mi = 1.609 km; 1.000 km = 0.621 mi: Concurrency terminus; Incomplete access

== In popular culture ==
A photograph of the Hay Street pedestrian mall taken in the early 1980s was used as the cover art for Perth-based psychedelic rock band Pond's 2017 album The Weather.

== See also ==
- List of lanes and arcades in Perth, Western Australia
