= List of heritage buildings in Perth, Western Australia =

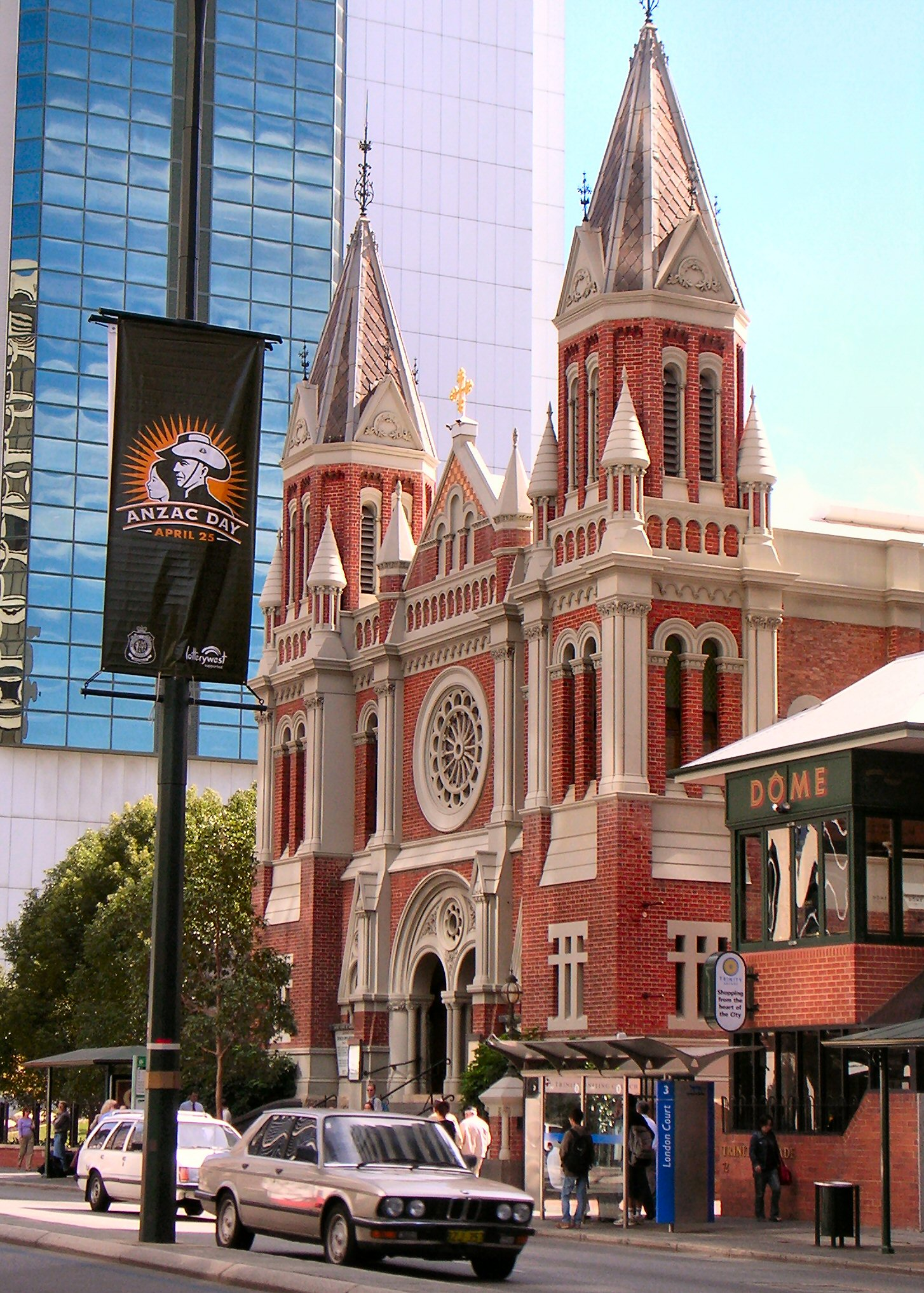
Trinity Uniting Church, built in 1897

Perth, Western Australia was occupied by British settlers in 1829 and originally named the Swan River Colony. Many of the older buildings are still extant, and have been heritage-listed. The places are listed here in chronological order and include significant buildings in the Perth metropolitan area. Included are examples of governmental, religious, residential, commercial and institutional buildings. Places of identified heritage significance in metropolitan and regional Western Australia are listed in the official "InHerit" database which includes the State Register of Heritage Places, local government inventories and other lists, the Australian Government's heritage list, and other non-government lists and surveys.

Western Australia’s settlements struggled in the 1800s from lack of resources, labour and investment. The gold rushes of the 1890s brought a great influx of people from interstate and overseas, and considerable development arising from the new wealth. Many ornate and substantial buildings were constructed in the metropolitan area from the 1890s to the early-mid 1900s, including the Palace Hotel, Perth, the Esplanade Hotel, Fremantle, His Majesty's Theatre, Perth and the Old Perth Technical School.

In the late 1950s, a group of individuals who were concerned for the need to "preserve our heritage" came together to form the National Trust of Australia (WA) in 1959. The National Trust’s mandate was to educate the public on the importance of valuing our landscapes. At this time, there was no legislation or a statutory body in WA to formally recognise and protect heritage places. The National Trust was able to promote and bring attention to the significance of the state's heritage places including natural landscapes and buildings which were supported by heritage assessments of buildings with a classification system. In 1965, an Act of Parliament established the National Trust as a statutory body in WA and properties were able to be vested under the responsibility of the organisation.

A mining boom in the 1960s-70s led to another wave of intensive development in Perth and as a result the city lost many of its early 1900s buildings, particularly along St Georges Terrace. From this time, a greater awareness in the community of the loss of heritage places developed as demonstrated by several high profile public campaigns for the Pensioner Barracks (now the Barracks Arch), the Palace Hotel on St Georges Terrace and the Swan Brewery.

The lack of statutory protection for heritage places was a serious issue in WA and it wasn’t until the adoption of the Heritage Act of WA 1990 and the formation of the Heritage Council that post-colonial heritage places were given recognition and statutory protection under the State Register of Heritage Places. This work is undertaken by the State Heritage Office which supports the Heritage Council and Minister for Heritage. Aboriginal heritage places are dealt with separately under the Aboriginal Heritage Act 1972.

Further, under the Heritage Act of WA 1990, each local government in Western Australia is required to compile a Municipal Heritage Inventory which identifies places of heritage significance within their municipality.

The National Trust of Australia (WA) since the early 1960s has maintained a List of Classified Places. Classification by the National Trust does not provide statutory protection; instead these assessments provide a record of heritage places (historic, natural and Aboriginal) and support the Trust’s education and advocacy programs. The National Trust's List of Classified Places can be searched via the "inHerit" website.

Thousands of places across Western Australia have been recognised for their heritage significance. The recognition, protection and conservation of these heritage places has developed from individuals and communities who value these places and understand the contribution they make to WA’s history, culture and environment.

== List ==
Building	Construction period	HCWA link	Notes	Image
=== 1830s ===
The Round House; Fremantle	1830		Built as a prison shortly after the establishment of the Swan River Colony in 1829.	
The Old Mill; South Perth	1835		also known as Shenton's Mill. The original (1833) building was destroyed in 1834 and rebuilt.	
The Old Court House; Supreme Court Gardens, Perth	Built between 1836 and 1837		The city's oldest surviving public building. Designed by Henry Willey Reveley. As of 2016, houses the Francis Burt Law Education Centre and Museum.	
Tranby House; Maylands	Built in 1839		Built by a group of devout Methodists known as the Tranby People who arrived in the Swan River Colony in 1830.	
=== 1840s ===
All Saints Church; Upper Swan	Built between 1838 and 1840		The oldest still-standing church in Western Australia.	
St John's Pro-Cathedral; 18 Victoria Avenue, Perth	Between 1843 and 1844		The earliest Roman Catholic church building constructed in Western Australia.	
Shenton House Crawley	1846		Substantial house built in 1846. Now part of the University of Western Australia campus and home to the School of Indigenous Studies.	
=== 1850s ===
Old Perth Boys School; 139 St Georges Terrace, Perth	1854		Taken over by the Technical College in 1898 - owned by the National Trust of Australia (WA).	
Royal Perth Hospital	1855			
Perth Gaol; Northbridge, behind Western Australian Museum	Built in 1856			
The Cloisters; 200 St Georges Terrace, Perth	Built in 1858		Designed by Richard Roach Jewell for Bishop Mathew Blagden Hale. Served as W.A.'s first boys' secondary school	
Fremantle Prison; Fremantle	Between 1852 and 1859			
The Deanery; Corner of St Georges Terrace and Pier Street, Perth	Built in 1859		Built as a residence for the first Dean of Perth.	
Bishop's House; Corner Spring Street and Mounts Bay Road, Perth.	Built in 1859		Residence of Bishop Mathew Blagden Hale	
Benedictine Stables; 18 Barrett St Wembley	Built from 1859		Thought to be a remnant of a Benedictine Monastery built in 1859.	
=== 1860s ===
Archbishop's Palace; 41 Victoria Square, Perth	First stage completed 1860		Built by Bishop Joseph Serra who became Catholic Bishop of Perth	
Barracks Arch; 266 St Georges Terrace, Perth	Built in 1863		The former Barracks were built to house the retired Pensioner Forces. The two wings on each side of the entrance were demolished in the 1960s to make way for the Mitchell Freeway. The Government of the day—led by David Brand—intended to demolish the entire structure, but public outrage forced a compromise and the arch was saved.	
Government House; St Georges Terrace, Perth	Between 1859 and 1864		Official residence of the Governor of Western Australia	
Fremantle Arts Centre; Finnerty Street, Fremantle	Between 1861 and 1864		Originally built as the Fremantle Lunatic Asylum	
Trinity Church; 72 St Georges Terrace, Perth	Partly obscured Trinity Congregational Chapel was built in 1865. The Church (foreground) was built in 1897.		Chapel designed by Richard Roach Jewell. Hosted the first meeting of the Karrakatta Club in 1894.	
St Mary's Cathedral; 41 Victoria Square, Perth	Western end was begun in 1865			
=== 1870s ===
Perth Town Hall; Corner Barrack and Hay Streets, Perth	Between 1868 and 1870		Built using convict labour	
Wesley Church; 75 William Street, corner Hay Street	1870			
St Mary's Church; Middle Swan	1870		Located near the site of an earlier octagonal church which had been built in 1839	
Central Government Offices; Barrack Street, Perth	1874		The former Treasury buildings and Titles Office buildings bounded by Barrack St, St Georges Tce and Cathedral Avenue were originally Perth's GPO, which was moved by the Commonwealth to the Forrest Place building in 1923.	
=== 1880s ===
Royal Hotel, Perth; 300 Murray Street	1882		Part of Raine Square	
Fremantle Grammar School; 200 High Street, Fremantle	1885		Established by Henry Briggs as an Anglican public school	
Fremantle Town Hall; 8 William Street, Fremantle	1887			
Court Hotel; Beaufort Street, Northbridge	1888			
St George's Cathedral; 2 Cathedral Avenue, Perth	Completed in 1888		Currently undergoing a major renovation	
=== 1890s ===
St George's House; 235-239 St Georges Terrace, Perth	1892		designed by Talbot Hobbs	
The Weld Club; 4 Barrack Street, Perth	1892		designed by Talbot Hobbs	
Perth Railway Station; Wellington Street, Perth	1893 to 1894		designed by George Temple-Poole	
Theatre Royal & Metropole Hotel; 637-645 Hay St	1894-97			
The Palace Hotel; William Street and St Georges Terrace, Perth	1896		Currently offices for Bank of Western Australia	
The Esplanade Hotel; Marine Terrace, Fremantle	1896			
Beaufort Street Terraces; 235-241 Beaufort Street, Highgate	1897		Currently used as doctors' and dentists' surgeries, and private residences	
Fremantle Markets; Market Street, Fremantle	Commenced in 1897		Design - H.J. Eales and Charles Oldham.	
Tom Burke House; 191-195 Newcastle Street, Northbridge	c.1898		designed & initially occupied by Louis Bowser Cumpston	
Perth Mint; 310 Hay Street, Perth	Foundation stone was laid in 1896 and competed in 1899		Australia's oldest operating mint	
Old Perth Observatory; 4 Havelock St, West Perth	Construction completed 1896 and officially opened in 1900		National Trust, WA branch Headquarters. Design - George Temple-Poole	
Jubilee Building; North Perth	completed in 1899		Part of the Western Australian Museum	
The Cliffe; Peppermint Grove	constructed in 1894		designed by Talbot Hobbs	
=== 1900s ===
The Old Perth Fire Station; Perth	1900		First purpose-built fire station in WA, operated until 1979. Now the FESA Fire Safety Education Centre & Museum	
His Majesty's Theatre; Perth	1904		Constructed at the time of the Western Australian gold rush, it was the largest theatre in Australia, and had seating for over 2,500 people. It is believed to be the only remaining working Edwardian theatre in Australia.	
The North Mole Lighthouse; Fremantle	1906		This cast iron light tower, together with its southern twin, are the only remaining navigation lights of this design in this State.	
=== 1910s ===
The Old Perth Technical School; Perth	1910		First tertiary-education institution in WA. Designed by Hillson Beasley and built on the site of Reveley's Tuscan mill.	
Wireless Hill Museum	1912		Originally built as the Applecross Wireless Station	Wireless Hill Museum
The Albany Bell Castle	1914		Bakehouse Factory, expression with considerable elaboration of details, towers, battlements, generous natural lighting and garden setting, is uncommon in the Western Australian community	
Anzac Cottage	1915			
=== 1920s ===
General Post Office, Perth	1923			
Young Australia League building	1924			
Pagoda; 111 Melville Pde Como	1926		Octagonal tearooms constructed with a three-tiered oriental styled roof.	
=== 1930s ===
Salvation Army Congress Hall (fmr); 69 Murray Street, Perth	1929–30			
Atlas Building; 8–10 The Esplanade, Perth	1931		Houses the Museum of Perth	
St Joseph's Church; Subiaco	1933–1934		Interwar Gothic church designed by Edgar Le Blond Henderson.	
First Church of Christ, Scientist, Perth	1939		Art Deco church designed by Ochiltree & Hargrave	

== See also ==
- List of heritage places in Fremantle
- History of Perth, Western Australia
- Category:Heritage places of Western Australia
