= History of Perth, Western Australia =

Perth is the capital city of Western Australia. It was established by Britain as the Swan River Colony in 1829. The area had been explored by Europeans as early as 1697, and occupied by the Indigenous Whadjuk Noongar people for millennia.

Perth was established by Captain James Stirling in 1829 as the administrative centre of the Swan River Colony. It gained city status (currently vested in the smaller City of Perth) in 1856 and was promoted to the status of a Lord Mayorality in 1929. The city inherited its name due to the influence of Sir George Murray, then Member of Parliament for Perthshire and Secretary of State for War and the Colonies.

Perth has been shaped by successive periods of mineral resource-led economic expansion and population growth commencing with the gold rush of the 1890s. Since at least 1966 Perth's growth rate has been continuously higher than the national average.

== Aboriginal history ==
Before the founding of the Swan River Colony, the indigenous Noongar people were well established in the southwest corner of Western Australia, hunting and gathering. They called the area on which Perth now stands Boorloo. Boorloo formed part of Mooro, the tribal lands of Yellagonga, whose group was one of several based around the Swan River, known collectively as the Whadjuk. Like elsewhere in Australia, Aboriginal occupation of the coastal plain created conditions attractive to European settlement. In many cases colonial settlements and homesteads were located on grounds which Aboriginal people had cultivated with native vegetation cropping and cleared with fire whilst road alignments often followed Aboriginal tracks through the bush.

The lakes on the coastal plain were particularly important to the Aboriginal people, providing them with both spiritual and physical sustenance. The swamps to the north of the river provided food, meeting places, shelter, and familiar hunting grounds. Fish, turtles, oysters, crabs, birds and their eggs, frogs, edible roots, fungi, kangaroos and possums abounded. The waters were fringed with tea-tree, grass trees and paper bark, the last providing shelter. The large flat spaces of the swamp flood plains created natural amphitheatres for ceremonies and camping.

From 1831, there were hostile encounters between settlers and Noongars that culminated in several executions and massacres that lead to the disintegration of the tribes and their retreat to the swamps and lakes north of the river. These were known to them as Boodjamooling, and became their main campsites and gathering places following dispossession from traditional lands.

== Early European exploration ==
Early European exploration of the area commenced in 1697 with the first European sighting of the Swan River by Dutch captain Willem de Vlamingh. A sloop was dragged over the limestone bar and sandy shoals that blocked the river mouth, and an expedition made up the river. Surveying the area from "high ground" (Mount Eliza), Vlamingh was not impressed. Similar explorations by the French in 1801, and the British in 1822 left equally unfavourable impressions regarding any potential settlement of the area.

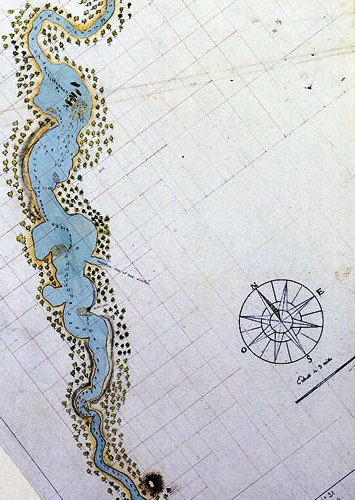
The first detailed map of the Swan River, drawn by the French in 1801

The first explorer to gain a favourable opinion of the Swan River was Captain James Stirling, who explored the area in March 1827. With relatives in the powerful British East India Company, Stirling was predisposed to the idea of a West Australian colony with potential for Indian Ocean trade.

With Frederick Garling and the botanist Charles Fraser, Stirling spent 12 days exploring the river, travelling as far upstream as the Ellen Brook junction. The party did not go far enough ashore to see that sandy soil characterised much of the land around the river. As a result, their favourable impressions of the quality of the soil was highly inaccurate, but became instrumental in the decision to establish the Swan River Colony.

In his reports to the Home Office, Stirling acknowledged that previous explorations had found the area "sterile, forbidding and inhospitable" but argued that he had found it superior to New South Wales even, and promoted in glowing terms the agricultural potential of the area. His lobbying was for the establishment of a free settlement, unlike the other penal settlements at New South Wales, Port Arthur and Norfolk Island. Persuaded that the proposed colony would incur no significant cost on the part of the British Government, and perhaps fuelled by rumours that the French were about to establish a penal colony in the western part of Australia, the Colonial Office assented to the proposal in mid-October 1828.

== Founding of the Swan River Colony (1829) ==
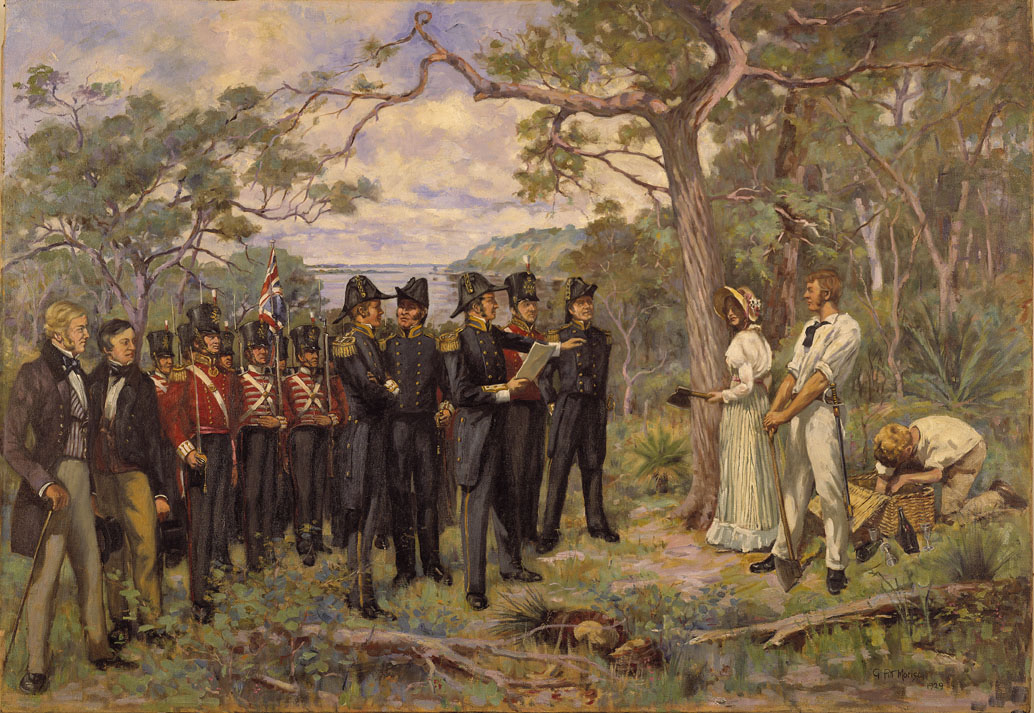
The Foundation of Perth 1829 by George Pitt Morison is an historical reconstruction of the official ceremony by which Perth was founded, although not everyone depicted may have actually been present.

Over five weeks after Charles Fremantle arrived aboard HMS Challenger, the first fleet of settlers arrived in June 1829, disembarking with their possessions onto Garden Island. No land had been allocated, and no buildings had been constructed. Under intense pressure from the settlers, Stirling's energetic Surveyor-General, John Septimus Roe went to work demarcating the allotments along the river. The fertile locations around Perth did not extend very far from the Swan and Canning Rivers, and the most fertile locations were upstream. The district of Guildford had the best quality soils and was settled in the first year of the colony.

=== Layout of the principal towns ===
Septimus Roe laid out the townsites of Perth, Fremantle and Guildford. Fremantle was to be the port city, and entry into the colony; Guildford was the loading point for agricultural produce that was to be shipped down the Swan River; and Perth was the administrative and military hub. All three towns developed slowly in the early years.

The boundaries of the capital Perth were defined by the Swan River to the south and east, by the promontory of Mount Eliza to the west, and by a chain of swamps and lakes to the north. The site was chosen for its access to fresh water and river transport, the availability of building materials, fine views of the Darling Scarp and the shelter offered by Mount Eliza from naval bombardment. The official foundation ceremony took place on 12 August 1829 with the chopping down of a tree by Helen Dance, the wife of Captain William Dance of HMS Sulphur. This event is commemorated by a plaque set in the footpath of Barrack Street at the approximate location.

== Early years (1830–1849) ==
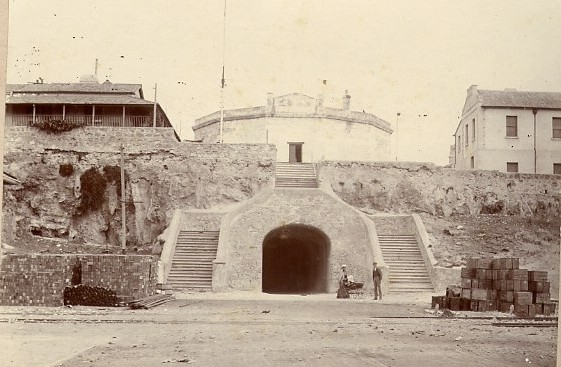
The Round House, built in 1831

As much of the remaining land turned out to be quite sandy and unsuitable for agriculture, the first reports of the colony were not as glowing as Stirling had been led to expect. These reports, along with the difficulty of clearing land to grow crops, was a factor in the slow growth of Perth during the first two decades. Agriculture developed away from Perth in places like the Avon Valley, and along the southwest coastline.

Transport in the early years was primarily along the coastline and river system, and one of the earliest projects was the construction of a 280-metre (920 ft) canal creating Burswood Island. Two years later, in 1833, the first dirt track between Perth and Fremantle was cut through the bush. Other tracks from the towns to the districts of Canning, Kelmscott, Guildford and Mandurah followed. (Note: Many built by destitute settlers who were forced to build roads in exchange for starvation rations from the Government stores.) The first bridge was the causeway across the Swan River, little more than a primitive timber bridge, but connecting what are now the suburbs of East Perth and Victoria Park.

Early building activity laid the administrative, institutional and social foundations of colonial society. In 1831 the Round House was completed, providing the colony with its first prison; the Court House was opened in December 1836, doubling as place of worship until St George's Church was built in 1842. This wasn't the first church however; that honour goes to the All Saints Church in the Swan Valley, north-east of Perth, completed in 1841. The colony's first brewery, Swan Brewery, was established at the corner of Spring Street and Mounts Bay Road, near the base of Mount Eliza in Perth.

Relations between the Europeans and local Aboriginal peoples were not always amicable, and sometimes resulted in violent skirmishes. On 11 July 1833, a senior warrior named Yagan, of the local Aboriginal tribe near the Swan River, was murdered after a bounty was issued for his capture following the slaying of a couple of settlers.

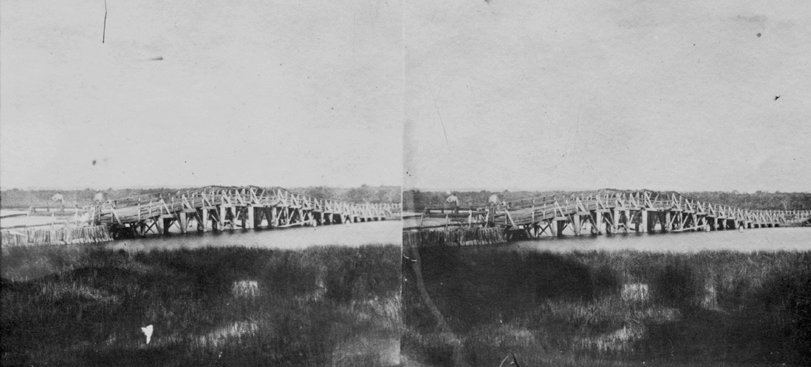
A stereoscopic image of The Causeway, c. 1862

By 1850, the population of the colony of Western Australia had increased to 5886, while the population around Perth was still only about 1940, approximately equal with that of Fremantle.

== Convict era (1850–1869) ==
In 1849, after a decade and half of meagre growth, Perth became a penal colony and in the next 16 years received an influx of nearly 10,000 convicts; by the time transportation ceased in 1868, convicts outnumbered free settlers 9,700 to 7,300. This significantly changed the social and economic dynamics of the colony. The convicts were involved in the construction of a large amount of infrastructure and this shaped the character of the city.

Perth's early buildings had been rudimentary and simple, however with the arrival of labour in the form of a convict workforce, new buildings of colonial authority arose. These embraced the culture and aspirations of Empire in a remote settlement, and were largely constructed in the Gothic style so much in vogue in England at the time. Constructed of locally harvested clay bricks, mellow in colour and soft in texture, the public architecture of the colony was relatively small-scale as befitting a new settlement. Buildings constructed during this time include the Fremantle Prison, Government House, the Perth Town Hall, The Cloisters, Perth Gaol, and the Swan River Mechanics' Institute.

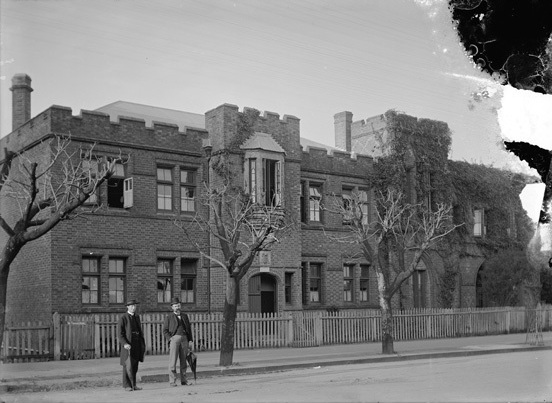
The Cloisters on St George's Terrace in 1900

The convict workforce led to an improvement in the prospects of the colony, however Perth's underlying identity as a remote and rustic frontier town remained unchanged. Despite being proclaimed a city by Queen Victoria in 1856, fourteen years later a Melbourne journalist described Perth as:

a quiet little town of some 3000 inhabitants spread out in straggling allotments down to the water's edge, intermingled with gardens and shrubberies and half rural in its aspect ... The main streets are macadamised, but the outlying ones and most of the footpaths retain their native state from the loose sand – the all pervading element of Western Australia – productive of intense glare or much dust in the summer and dissolving into slush during the rainy season.

This village-like atmosphere of scattered single and two story brick or stone residences, surrounded by gardens, remained unchanged until the 1880s and 1890s.

== Later 19th century (1870–1901) ==
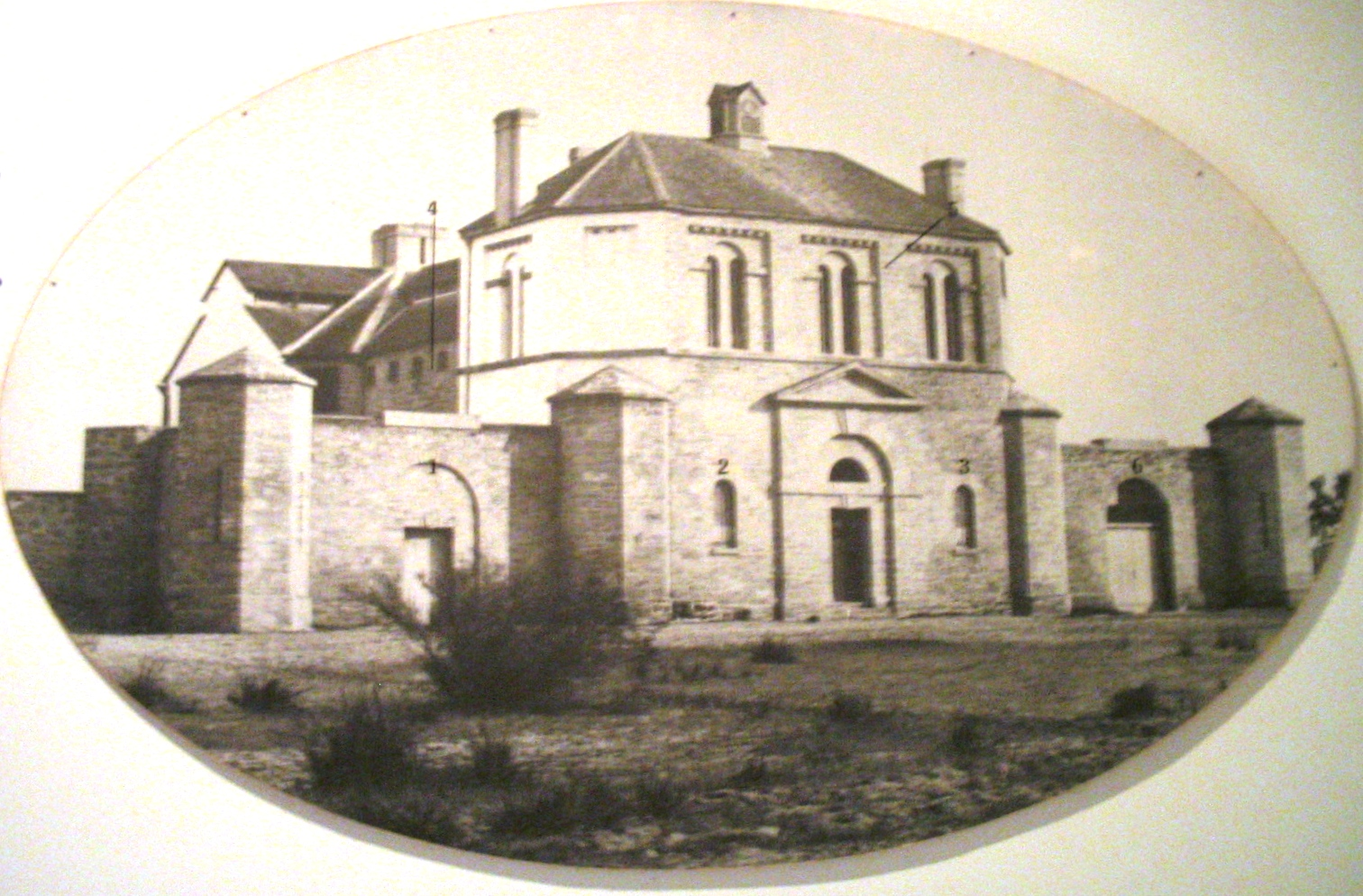
Perth Gaol building in the 1860s

The latter half of the nineteenth century, and in particular the last two decades, saw Perth begin to grow for the first time in a significant way. In 1877, a telegraph line from Adelaide to Perth was completed, vastly improving intracontinental communication. This increased the growth of colonial media, such as the first weekly newspaper, the Western Mail, which commenced publishing in 1885.

Government architecture continued to shape the central city. In 1874 large and impressive government offices were constructed, housing the Cabinet, Treasury, Titles Office and Post Office. The business district developed slowly with a mix of shops and cottages to the west of Barrack Street. By the 1880s residential development had commenced in West Perth, while industrial development was concentrated in East Perth.

During this time two events significantly shaped the development of both central Perth and the wider metropolitan region: the construction of a railway from Fremantle to Guildford, completed in 1881, and the Western Australian gold rushes, commencing in 1885.

=== First mining boom - the gold rushes (1885–1901) ===
The discovery of gold in the Kimberley, Murchison and Kalgoorlie regions in the 1880s and 1890s, and the concurrent granting of responsible government to Western Australia in 1890 had a huge impact on the development of Perth. The physical nature of the city changed dramatically with economic prosperity and the increase of population as a result of gold rush immigration. In one decade the population of the city tripled, from 8,447 in 1891 to 27,553 in 1901. (Note: According to the 1891 and 1901 censuses.) By the beginning of the twentieth century, Perth was totally transformed. Its streets were lined with elaborately styled multi-storey buildings, many of which were designed by members of a now large architectural profession, and the population had spilled over into new suburbs that encircled the city.

The location of the central Perth railway station had an enormous influence on the pattern and concentration of land uses within the city. With the railway line providing a boundary to the north, and the Government domain to the south, commercial and professional development was concentrated within the city's central axis, bounded by William and Barrack streets. This development was highlighted by the opening of Western Australia's first department store, Boans, in 1895. Eventually, several department stores opened in this precinct, including Foy & Gibson, Aherns, Bon Marche, Myer and David Jones. This created a vibrant walkable district, accessible by public transport, that remains to this day.

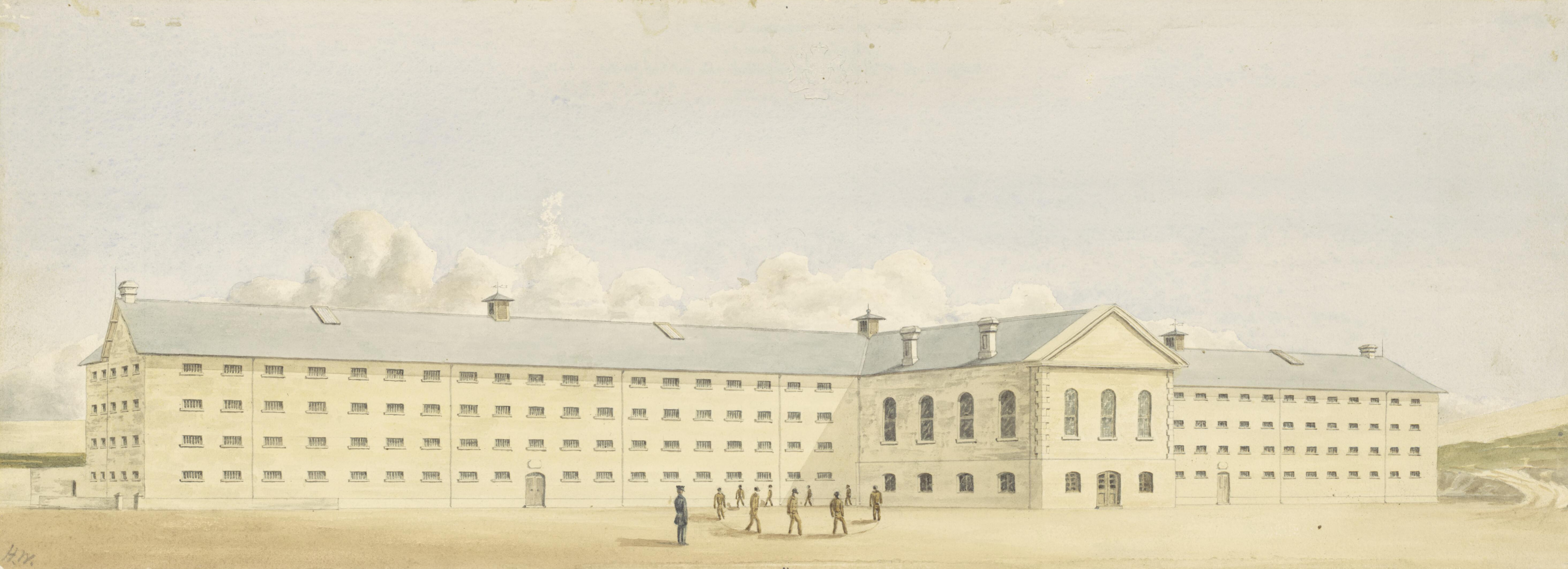
An 1859 watercolour of Fremantle Prison, by Henry Wray (1824–1900)

The population growth provided the impetus for the expansion of infrastructure, services, and facilities, although not necessarily fast enough to cater for growing demand. In 1893, electricity generation was made available to the city of Perth, and the suburban rail line was extended from Perth to Armadale in the same year. In 1898, the Perth Zoo opened.

In 1897, Fremantle Harbour was officially opened. The harbour provided access to the Swan River for larger vessels, made possible after blasting the rocky bar across the Swan River mouth and dredging under the guidance of the colony's Engineer-in-Chief, Charles Yelverton O'Connor. The completion of this project set the seal on Fremantle becoming and remaining the main harbour in Western Australia, finally supplanting Albany.

On 28 September 1899, the first electric tram services commenced, operated by Perth Electric Tramways, with services from East Perth along Hay Street to Milligan Street. The Perth Mint, on Hay Street in East Perth, opened the same year.

== Early 20th century (1902–1929) ==
Within two years of federation the gold boom had peaked and prospectors were either leaving the state or moving into Perth or the other regions of Western Australia.

In 1902, Claremont Teachers College, in the suburb of Claremont, became the first post-secondary educational institute in Western Australia – and eventually a campus of Edith Cowan University before being acquired by the University of Western Australia.

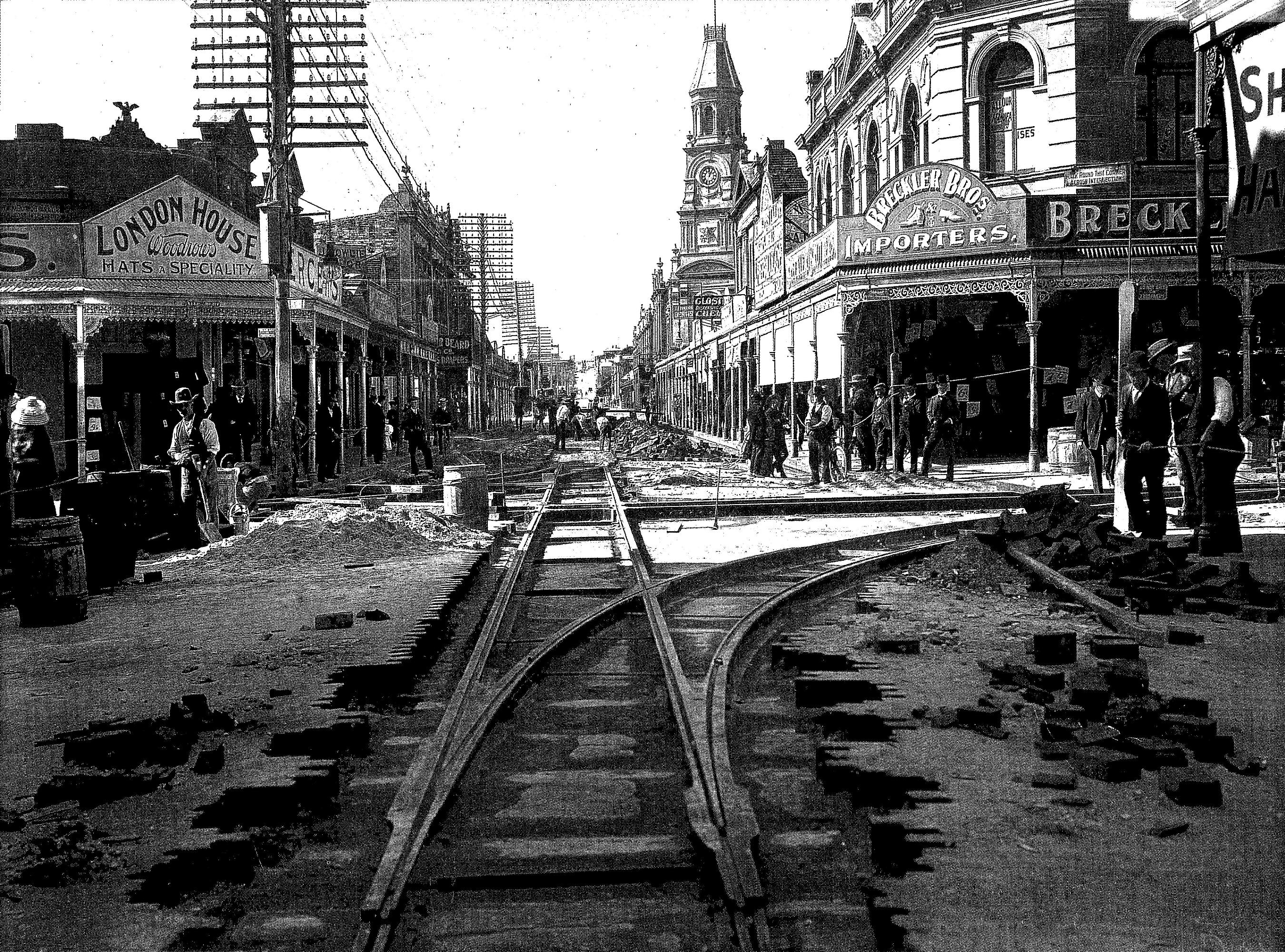
Tramlines being laid along High Street in Fremantle in 1905

In 1903, a pipeline from Mundaring Weir to Kalgoorlie opened. This was a major achievement for its time by the state's first Engineer-in-Chief C. Y. O'Connor.

In 1911, the University of Western Australia became Perth's first university, but it was not until 1913 that tuition began. The original campus was located in Irwin Street, between Hay Street and St Georges Terrace.

In May 1919, riots on the Fremantle wharves escalated into fatal violence.

A Women's Citizens League held was holding meetings in Perth by 1923.

In July 1926, there was major flooding of the Swan River. This caused the Fremantle Railway Bridge to collapse just after a train had passed over it. The Upper Swan Bridge was also damaged by the flood.

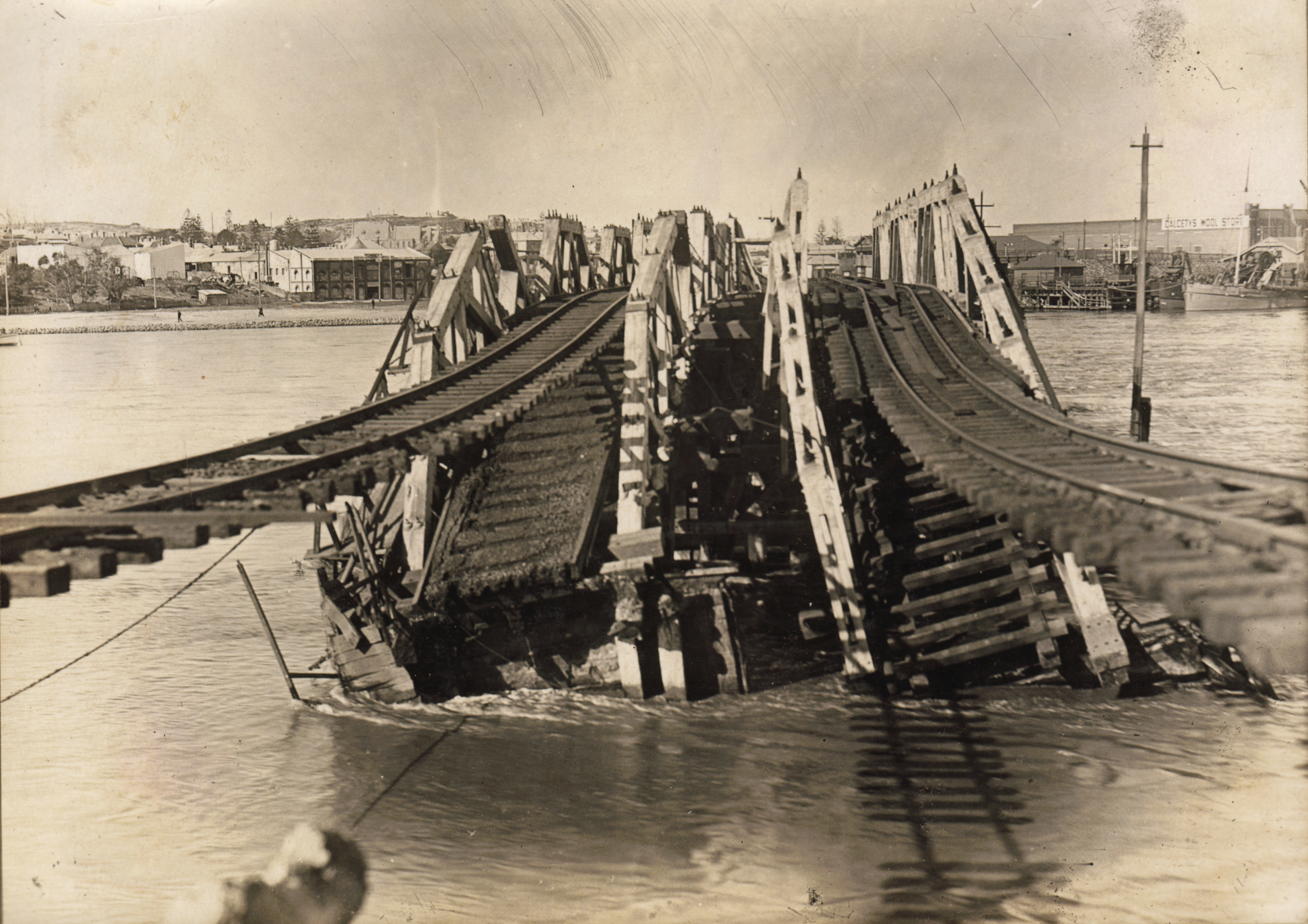
The collapse of the Fremantle Railway Bridge after damage by floodwaters in 1926

On 12 August 1929, Perth commemorated 100 years of British settlement.

== Hard times during the depression and world war (1930–1946) ==
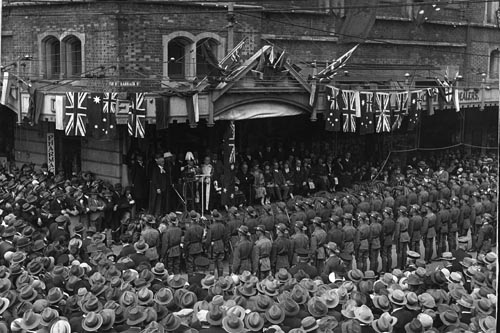
William Campion, Governor of Western Australia, unveils a commemorative tablet at the centenary celebrations in 1929

In 1930, telephone services connected Perth directly with Adelaide, and subsequently with eastern Australia.

In 1932, the University of Western Australia campus was moved from Perth to its present-day site in Crawley.

During World War II, Fremantle served as a base for submarines operating in the Pacific Theatre, and in 1943 a US Navy Catalina flying boat fleet was based at Matilda Bay. The Americans brought sixty to seventy Catalinas, and 1,200 personnel. American, Australian and Dutch pilots and crew used the Swan River for training purposes, and undertook missions that were as far away as Ceylon.

== Post war reconstruction (1947–1959) ==
Following the war there was an influx of European immigrants to Australia, with approximately 240,000 migrating to Perth between 1946 and 1970. Prior to the war, only 3.5% of Perth's population of 280,000 came from a non-English speaking background, while 14.1% of the population had been born in Britain, double the percentage of any of the other capital cities. By the 1970s, 21% of Perth's population was foreign born, with many migrating from Italy, Holland, Germany and other European nations.

In 1955, Gordon Stephenson and John Alistair Hepburn prepared a plan for Perth and Fremantle.

In 1958, the last of Perth's trams were retired from service, unable to compete with buses and cars.

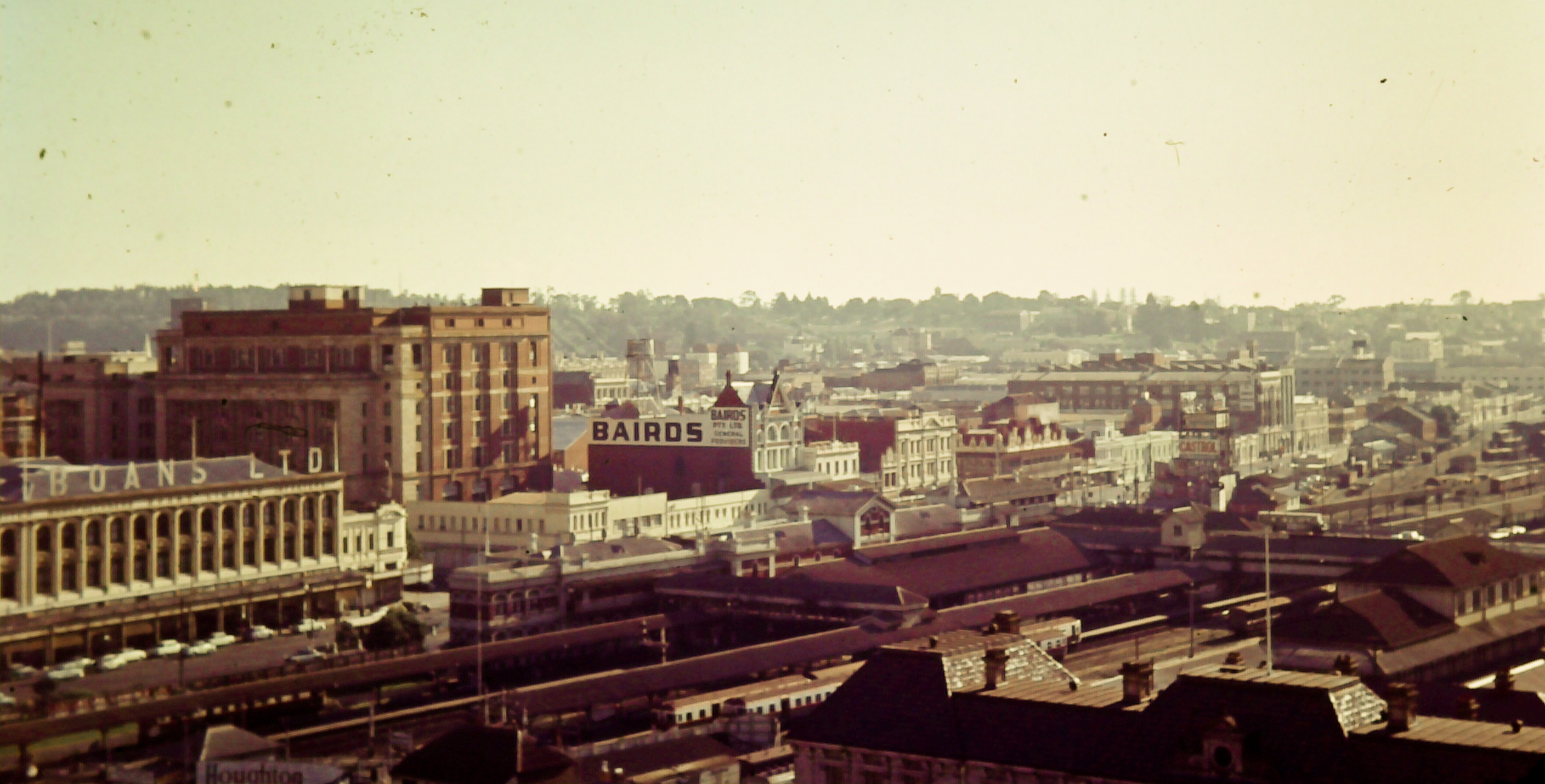
Perth, c. 1955

The Narrows Bridge opened in 1959, linking the north and south sides of the Swan River at The Narrows between Mill Point and Mount Eliza. At the time, it was the largest precast prestressed concrete bridge in the world.

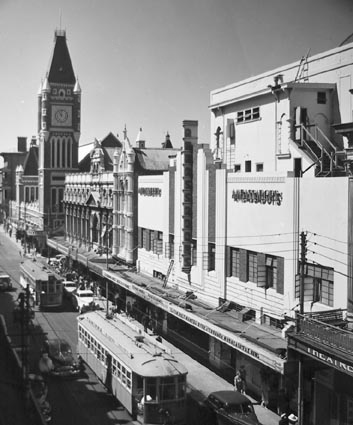
Electric trams on Hay Street in 1949

== Resources boom (1960–1972) ==
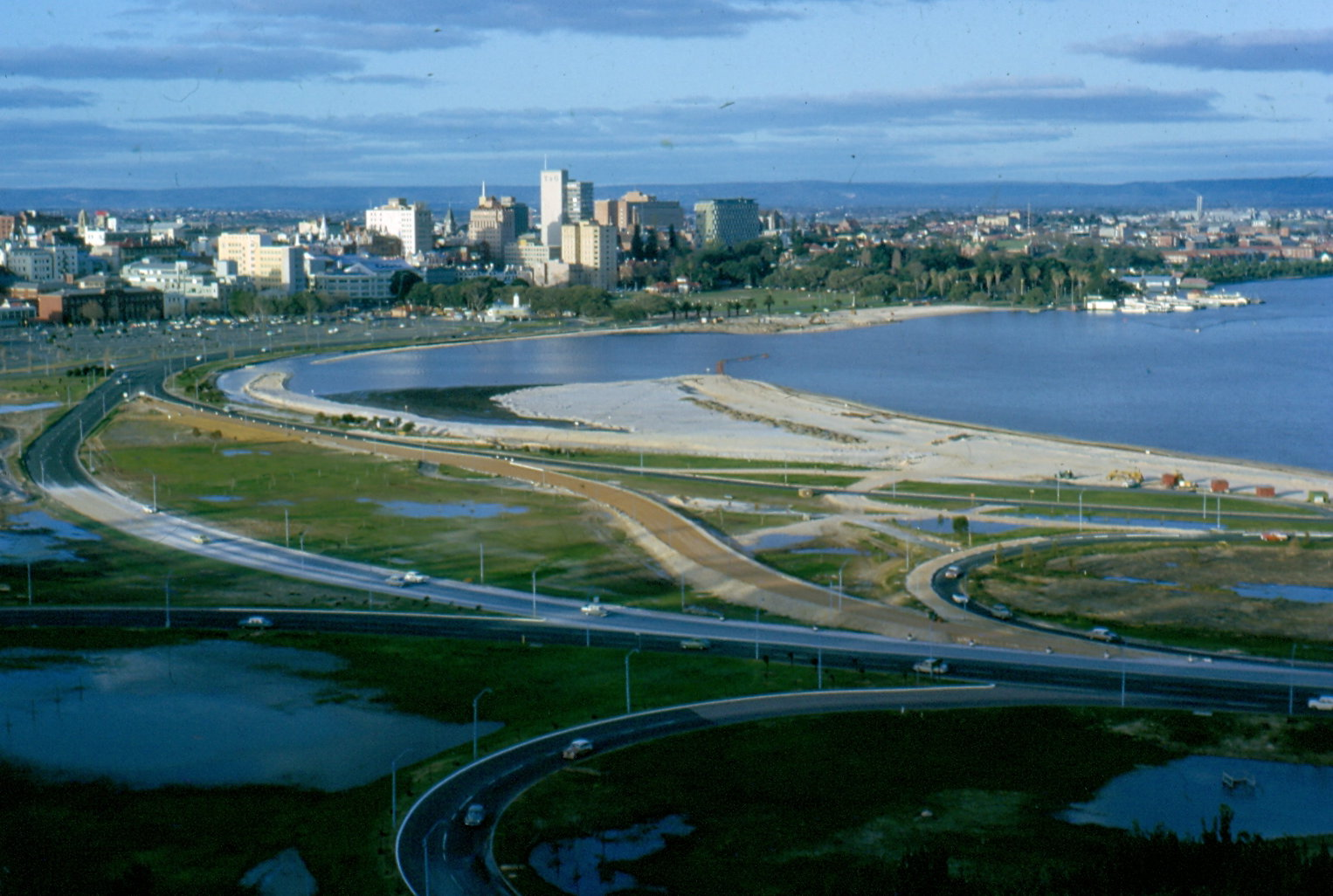
Perth skyline in 1964

Whilst the expansion of manufacturing had driven the economy through the 1950s, by 1960 the economy of the state was stagnating. This began to change in 1961 with the lifting of the iron-ore embargo and, over the next decade, the discovery of nickel, petroleum, bauxite, natural gas and alumina deposits throughout the state. This was the beginning of the state's second resources boom following the gold rush of the 1890s.

The city skyline changed significantly during this period with the construction of Perth's first skyscrapers.

On 20 February 1962, Perth became known worldwide as the "City of Light", as city residents lit their house lights and streetlights to celebrate American astronaut John Glenn on his orbit around the Earth on Friendship 7. The city repeated its feat as Glenn passed overhead on the Space Shuttle in 1998.

In 1962, Perth city hosted the British Empire and Commonwealth Games. Events were held from 22 November to 1 December at Perry Lakes Stadium in Floreat and Beatty Park Aquatic Centre in North Perth. Both venues were built for those games.

On 26 October 1964, serial killer Eric Edgar Cooke was the last criminal to be executed, by hanging, in Western Australia.

In 1964 the City of Perth appointed Paul Ritter as the City's first town planner, tasked with establishing a planning department and preparing the first town planning scheme. Ritter elevated the public profile of town planning through public education, activism and public disagreements with elected councillors. He was controversially sacked in 1967.

In 1966 the Pensioner's Barracks was demolished in the face of widespread public opposition, with only the archway remaining. This demolition was a defining moment in the campaign to protect historic buildings in Western Australia.

In 1969, the last of Perth's trolleybuses were retired from service.

In 1970, the first Test Cricket match in Perth was played, from 11 to 16 December, against England.

On 17 September 1974 Murdoch University, Perth's second university, was opened with an inauguration ceremony. Lectures commenced on 24 February 1975 with an enrolment of 510 students.

In 1979, the WAY '79 celebrations commemorated Perth's sesquicentenary, 150 years of European settlement. The city hosted the Miss Universe competition as part of the celebrations.

In 1979, the Fremantle line closed; it subsequently reopened in 1983. The reopening of the railway line was a turning point in state government policy towards the railway system leading to further investment and expansion of public transport.

== Uncertainty, change and scandal (1973–1993) ==
On 26 September 1983, Australia II won the America's Cup yacht race, the first time a challenger had won it in 132 years. Although this event was held off Newport, Rhode Island, it was a significant day in Perth's history. The Australia II challenge was financed by Perth businessman Alan Bond on behalf of the Royal Perth Yacht Club. After winning the cup, Perth had four years to prepare for its defence in 1987, and in those years Fremantle especially underwent considerable economic and cultural development.

In 1985, the Burswood Casino, Perth's only casino, opened for business. The resort opened in 1988.

In 1987, the city hosted, and lost, the defence of the America's Cup.

In the 1980s, a political scandal, which came to be known as WA Inc, caused the loss of public money – an estimated minimum of A$600 million, equivalent to A$1.4 billion in 2022 – and the insolvency of several large corporations. Some major businesses based in Perth suffered financial difficulties, in part due to the 1987 stock market crash, and eventually entered bankruptcy. On 19 November 1990, Carmen Lawrence, the then Labor premier, announced her government's intention to hold a royal commission to "inquire into certain matters". After almost two years of enquiries and hearings, it was found that the state government had engaged in major business dealings with prominent businessmen, including Alan Bond, Laurie Connell and Warren Anderson. Former premier Brian Burke and his predecessor, the Liberal premier Ray O'Connor ultimately served prison sentences as a result of convictions that arose from findings of the commission. Burke's successor, Peter Dowding, and public servant Len Brush were both found to have acted improperly.

In the late 1980s arson attacks on Asian-owned businesses by Jack van Tongeren and his white supremacist group the Australian Nationalist Worker's Union gained internal attention and strained ties with Western Australia's growing Asian community.

== Recession and recovery (1990–present) ==
In 1990, Western Australia gets its first heritage protection legislation, the Heritage Act of Western Australia 1990 (WA). Earlier protection powers under the National Trust were insufficient to save many historic buildings throughout the 1960s and 1970s.

In 1992, the Joondalup line opened to the northern suburbs, becoming the first suburban passenger railway line built in Perth since the Armadale line 103 years earlier. This railway line runs mostly along the centre of the Mitchell Freeway.

In July 1994, the state government separated the Perth central business district from its surrounding suburban districts, creating a new City of Perth and three other new local government authorities.

In 1995, the French Consulate in Perth was firebombed.

=== 21st century (2000–present) ===
In the first decade of the 21st century, driven by the Western Australian mining boom and associated economic development, it became Australia's fastest growing capital. From 2001 to 2011, the city's population increased by 346,000, which is comparable to Sydney's 499,000 over the same period despite being only one third the size. As with Melbourne, most population growth was absorbed by the outer suburbs, primarily in the City of Wanneroo, and the southern coastal suburbs (Cockburn, Rockingham and Kwinana). In recent years Perth has been getting a larger share of overseas migrants who, due to the demand for workers in the mining industry, are predominantly arriving on skilled migration visas. More than any other city in Australia, it has attracted migrants from the UK and South Africa. Major infrastructure projects completed included the $1.6 billion New MetroRail project, which effectively doubled the size of the Perth rail system, the Graham Farmer Freeway and Roe Highway.

On 19 September 2006, the Federal Court of Australia brought down a judgment finding that Noongar native title continued to exist over the Perth metropolitan area. An appeal was subsequently lodged and in 2008 the Full Court of the Federal Court upheld parts of the appeal by the Western Australian and Commonwealth governments. Following this appeal, the WA Government and the South West Aboriginal Land and Sea Council negotiated the South West Native Title Settlement, including the Whadjuk Indigenous Land Use Agreement over the Perth region, which was finalised by the Federal Court on 1 December 2021. As part of reaching this agreement, the Noongar (Koorah, Nitja, Boordahwan) (Past, Present, Future) Recognition Act was passed in 2016, recognising the Noongar people as the traditional owners of the south west region of Western Australia.

Notable events include:

- November 2006: The first desalination plant in Australia commenced operation in Kwinana.
- 22 March 2010: Storms caused hundreds of millions of dollars' worth of hail damage and left 150,000 homes without power.
- October 2011: Perth hosted the Commonwealth Heads of Government Meeting and the Queen visited.
- 2012: Construction of Brookfield Place was completed. Formerly known as City Square tower, the skyscraper is the second tallest in Western Australia and the eighth tallest in Australia.
- 2012: Construction began on Elizabeth Quay, a major redevelopment of the Perth foreshore. Elizabeth Quay opened on 29 January 2016.
- 2014: Barnett government abandons efforts to encourage 30 metropolitan local governments to amalgamate into 16 new local governments.
- March 2021: BP closes the Kwinana Oil Refinery.

== See also ==
- List of heritage buildings in Perth, Western Australia
- Land grants in the Swan River Colony
- A sketch of the vegetation of the Swan River Colony
