= Wesley Church, Perth =

Church in Perth, Western Australia

Wesley Church
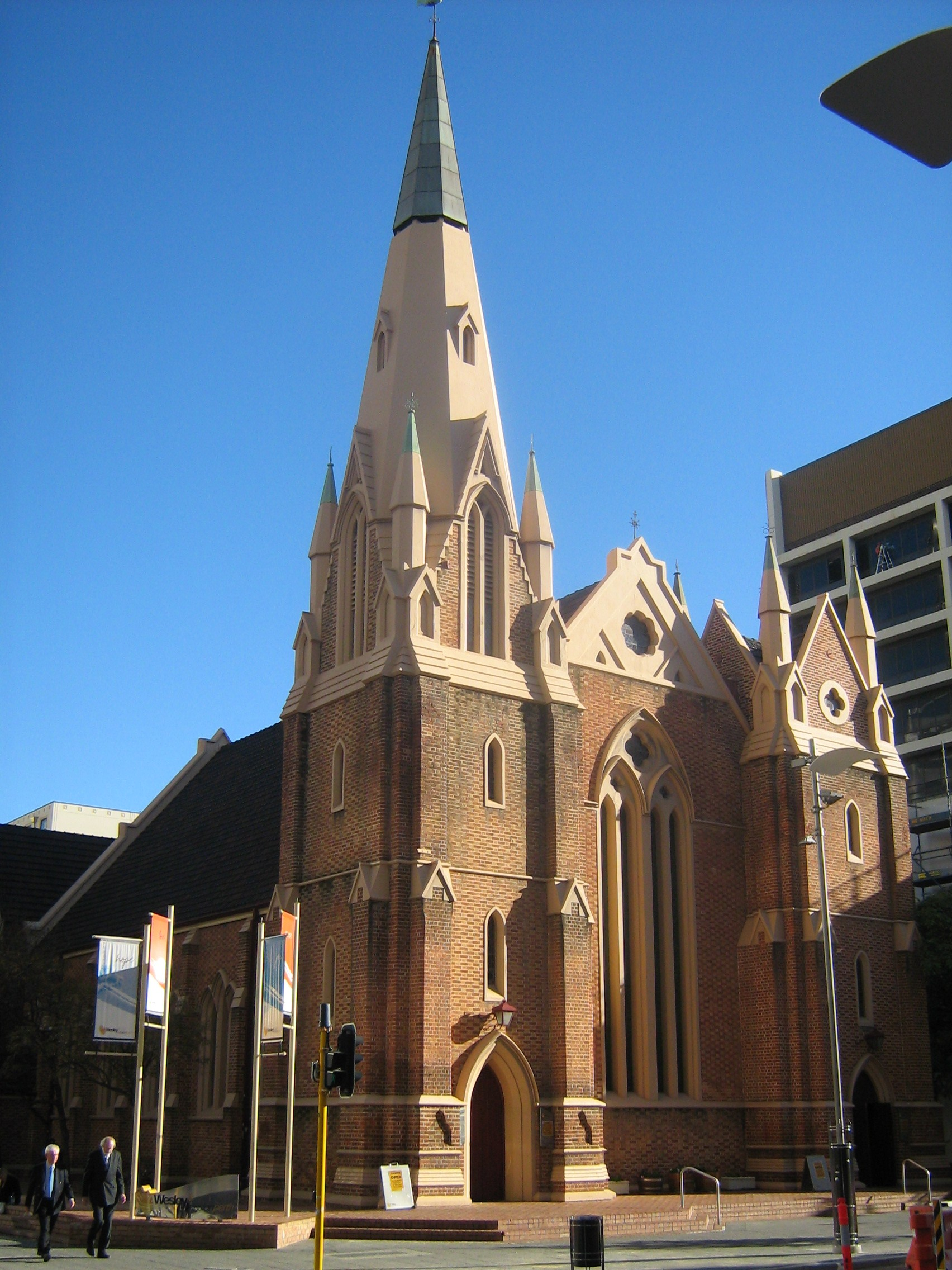
- Wesley Church
- Wesley Church
- 31°57′12″S 115°51′24″E
- Address: Corner of William Street and Hay Street, Perth, Western Australia
- Country: Australia
- Denomination: Uniting (since 1977)
- Previous denomination: Methodist (1867 – 1977)

History
- Status: Church
- Founded: 25 October 1867
- Founder: Governor John Stephen Hampton
- Dedicated: 10 April 1870

Architecture
- Functional status: Active
- Architect: Richard Roach Jewell
- Architectural type: Church
- Style: Gothic Revival
- Construction cost: c. £3,000, equivalent to A$471,821 in 2022

Specifications
- Materials: Flemish bond brick; jarrah

Administration
- Parish: Uniting Church in the City, Perth

Western Australia Heritage Register
- Type: State Registered Place
- Designated: 23 May 1995
- Reference no.: 2003

Wesley Church is a Uniting Church in Perth, Western Australia, located at the corner of William Street and Hay Street. It is one of the oldest church buildings and one of few remaining 19th-century colonial buildings in the City of Perth.

== Architecture ==
Wesley Church is built of load-bearing brick laid in Flemish bond in the Victorian academic Gothic Revival style and features a landmark spire, steeply pitched roofs, parapeted gables, label (hood) moulds and wall buttressing. The church has a strong verticality of form, emphasised by tall lancet windows with plate tracery to the east facade. Angle buttresses divide the nave wall into five bays, and the major windows have stucco label moulds above them. The bricks of the building, fired at uncertain temperatures in wood-burning kilns, show a range of mellow tones and, laid in Flemish bond, create a chequerboard effect on the walls, which provides a decorative element to the walls of the building. The spire is 35 metres (115 ft) high with a weathercock on top; it is surrounded by four smaller spires at its base, which are capped by metal finials. The north-east tower replicates these smaller spires above the gable. The roof structure is of hand-sawn timber and the roof covering was originally shingles, but at some point the Church was re-roofed in clay tiles.

== History ==
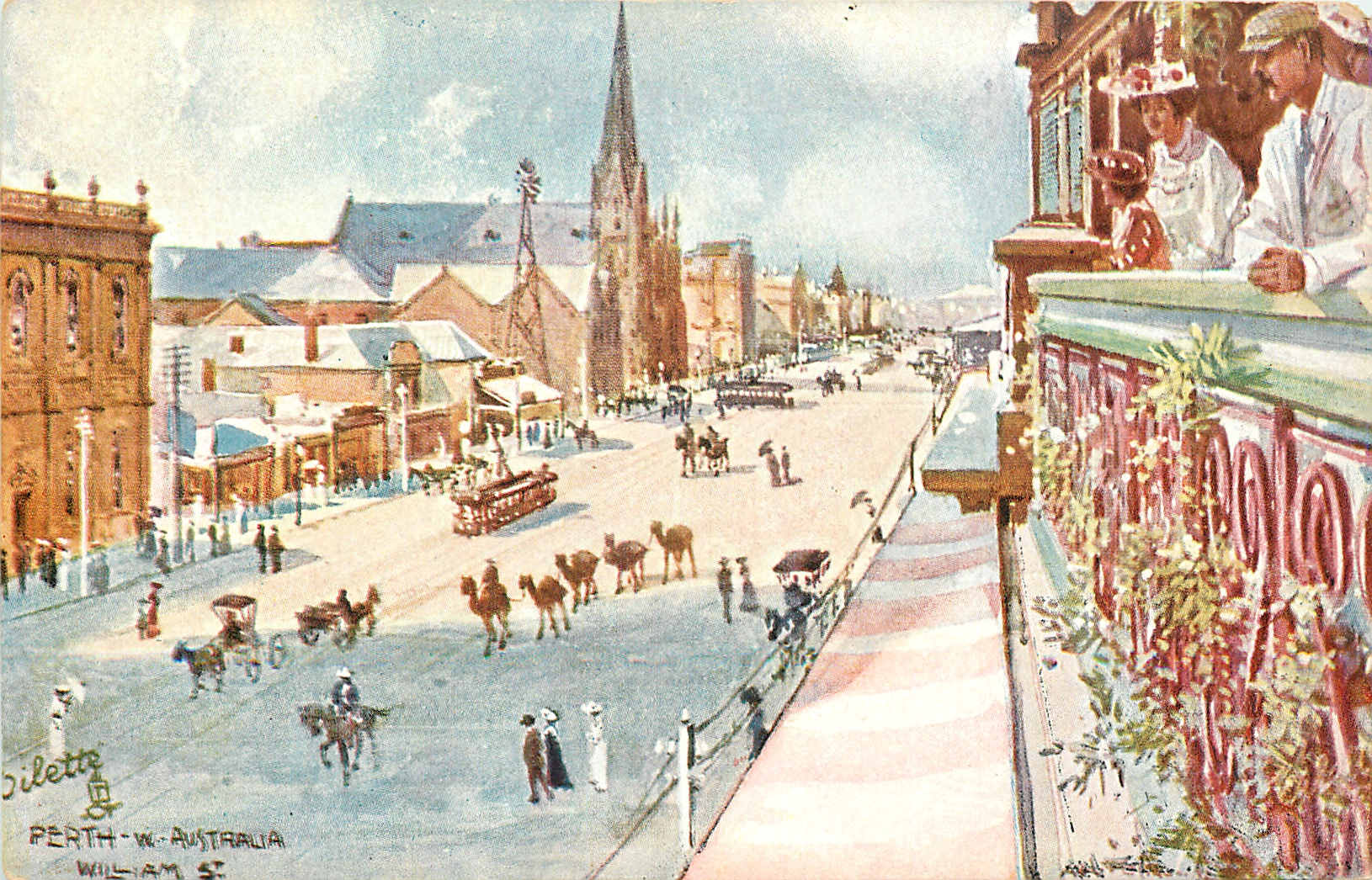
William St. (Camels on Street), Perth, W Australia (Tucks Oilette 1911/1912)

The first Methodists arrived in the Swan River Colony on 3 February 1830 aboard Tranby, to found a small religious community at Tranby House, six kilometres (four miles) upstream along the Swan River from the newly established town of Perth (approximately on the site of the current suburb of Maylands). The group was led by Joseph Hardey and John Wall Hardey, and included a surgeon, preacher, bricklayer, blacksmith, shoemaker, surveyor, hatter, midshipman and several farmers.

The site for the church was purchased from James Inkpen (the first recorded Methodist to arrive in the colony, having arrived in December 1829) at a cost of £400. The new church was the third Methodist place of worship to be built in the forty years in which the denomination had been established in the colony. The original church was subsequently used as a caretaker's cottage; the second was used for Sunday School, then an armoury and then a store. George Shenton (another prominent Methodist, the first Mayor of Perth, and a Member of the Western Australian Legislative Council) had earlier suggested that the name of the church be Wesley Church, and promised £1,000 to establish the building fund, with Joseph Hardey contributing a further £500.

Wesley Church was designed by Richard Roach Jewell, an architect, circuit steward, clerk of colonial works and church member. Jewell was responsible for the design of a number of other prominent Perth buildings, including the Cloisters (1858), the Pensioner Barracks (1863), and extensions and alterations to Government House (1864) and Perth Town Hall (1870). Jewell designed Wesley Church in the fashionable Gothic revival style, a style which he successfully adapted in his other buildings. Jewell's plan for Wesley Church, comprising the nave, chancel and bell tower with a tall and elegant spire, was accepted with one alteration - the relocation of the bell tower from the north-east side to the south-east side.

The foundation stone was laid on 25 October 1867 by Governor John Stephen Hampton. The church was opened on Sunday 10 April 1870 with services by reverends William Lowe (who married Joseph Hardey's daughter Mary Jane), William Traylen and T. C. Laurence. The total cost of the building was about £3,000, equivalent to A$471,800 in 2022 – a considerable sum for a church membership of 138 (with a quarterly income of a little over £66). The original bricks were made from local clay pits and the floor is made of jarrah. The church bell, originally hanging in the southern tower, came from the sailing ship Tranby, which brought the original members of the congregation to the colony.

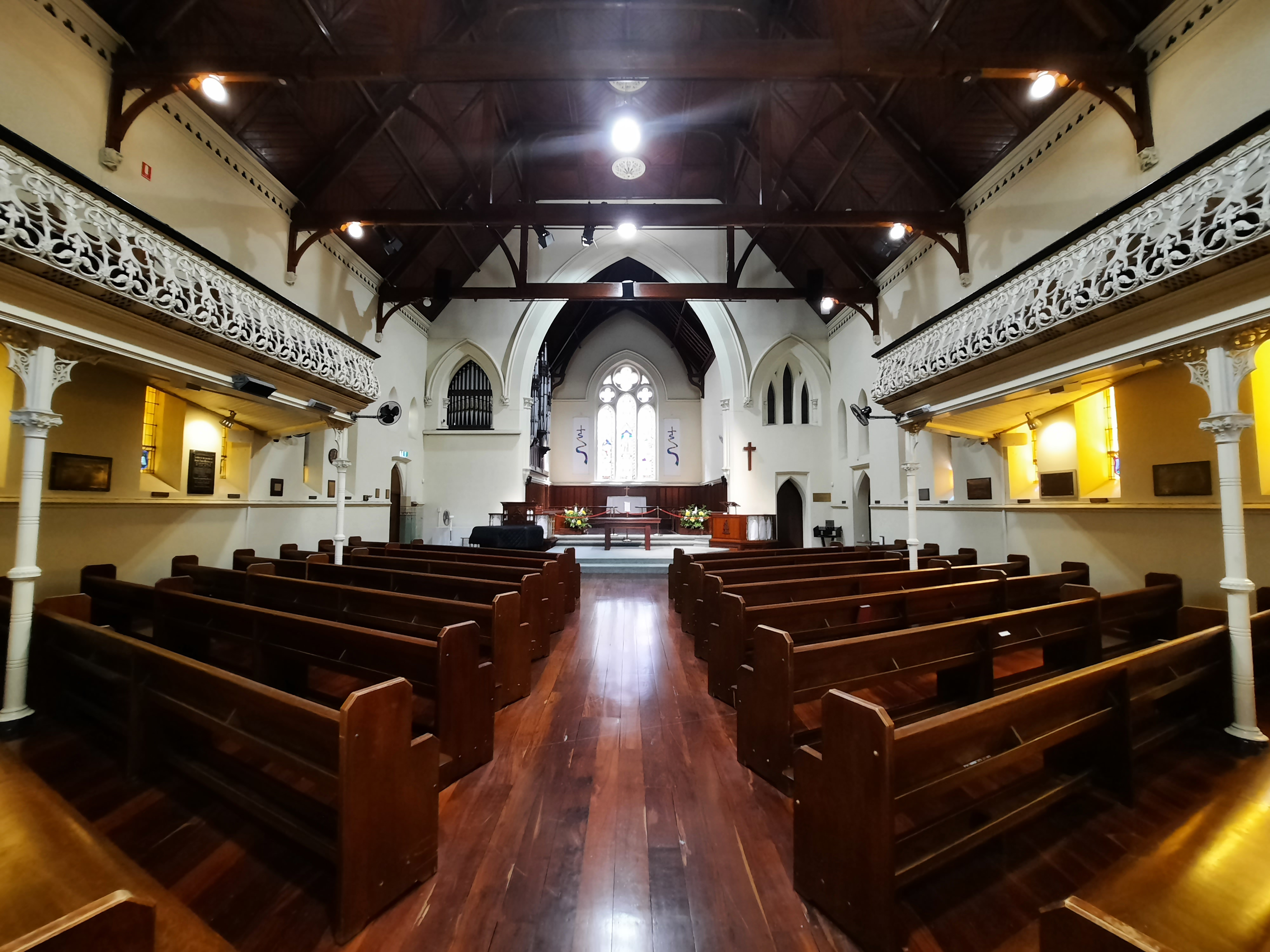
Interior of the church, nave at the centre with pipe organ on its left

In June 1875 the first church organ in the colony was installed at Wesley Church, a Bishop and Son instrument of two manuals and pedal with 15 speaking stops.

In 1880 a clergy vestry, choir vestry and organ loft were added to the Church at a cost of £385. In 1896 further alterations and additions were made, including the construction of the north-east tower (which buried the original foundation stone), the side galleries, the ceiling to the nave and the south-west porch. These alterations were undertaken by Talbot Hobbs (a prominent Perth-based architect) at a cost of £1,150.

The 1968 Meckering earthquake caused structural damage to the church's steeple. A decision was made to demolish the steeple but, when approximately 9.1 metres (30 ft) was removed, the remainder of the structure appeared secure and so a copper cone was placed on top to replace the damaged section. The bell was also removed from the tower, as it was considered that the structure was too weak to support its weight. The bell was then mounted on display outside on the Hay Street side of the church.

In 1974 redevelopment occurred on the north-west and south-west sides of the church site with the construction of the Wesley Arcade and Tower, which opened in May 1976. During these developments, a small chapel was constructed at the north-west corner of the church. Wesley Church continued to be used as an active centre of worship and in 1977 the Methodist congregation joined the Uniting Church in Australia. In 1985 the Church launched a Restoration Fund through the National Trust of Australia (WA) to restore the external brick walls, gables, parapets and high part of the tower brickwork. Restoration works were finally completed in mid 1987.

== Current uses ==
The church is currently the home of the Wesley worshipping community of the Uniting Church in the city, part of the Uniting Church in Australia.

== Heritage value ==
The Wesley Church was entered into the Register of the National Estate by the Australian Heritage Commission on 23 March 1985, and classified by the National Trust of Australia (WA) on 11 June 1973. On 23 May 1995 it was placed on the permanent State Heritage Register.
