= John Bell (Australian priest) =

Anglican priest of Perth, Western Australia

John Bell (12 November 1898 – 31 August 1983) was an Australian Anglican priest who was Dean of two cathedrals: St Peter's Cathedral, Armidale, and St George's Cathedral, Perth. He was also a noted radio broadcaster, known as the "Radio Parson".

== Early life ==
Bell was born in Half Morton, Dumfriesshire, Scotland, in 1898, to Thomas Bell (1863-1928), a ploughman, and his wife Isabella (née McCracken) (1866-1955). He was baptised in the United Presbyterian Church in Chapelknow.

At the age of 16 Bell joined the Army. (Note: The Cable Clerical Index states that, in 1917, Bell was a recipient of the Military Medal. However, this appears to be based on an assumption that the John Bell who is noted in the Australian War Memorial's record as being awarded the MM is the same person. This is unlikely, as there is no evidence that Bell lived in Australia prior to emigration in 1925; there is no reference to a MM in Crockford and none of the published interviews with Bell make any reference to it.) Towards the end of the war, Bell transferred to the nascent Royal Air Force and started to train as a pilot, but the war ended before he completed his training. After the war he became a cocoa planter in the Ivory Coast. Returning to England, he tried unsuccessfully to establish himself in business, and then became a voluntary worker in the Dockland Settlements in London. From there he went to Lewin's Mead in Bristol, undertaking similar work, and then on to Oxford to report on work in the slums. He entered Pembroke College, Oxford, with a view to ordination, and helped in the slum parish of St Ebbe's. He did not proceed to a degree, but met the Rev (later Canon) Henry Edward Hyde, who persuaded him to go to Western Australia in 1925.

== Clerical career ==
Bell trained for ordination at St John's Theological College, Perth, and was ordained deacon in 1926 and priest in 1928. He served his title at Christ Church, Claremont (1926-1929). During his curacy, Bell was also chaplain of Christ Church Grammar School, Claremont, (1927-1928), where the headmaster was Lionel Parry, who had been his college principal at St John's.

Bell was then Rector of St Mary's, South Perth (1929-1932). It was during Bell's incumbency that the site of the present church was acquired in 1929, the foundation stone laid in 1931 and the completed church dedicated and consecrated later the same year. In 1930, his father having recently died, Bell decided to return to England to spend some time with his mother. He signed on as a galleymate on the SS Barrhill but the ship was delayed and he transferred to the SS Maria de Larringa, subsequently learning that the cook on the Barrhill went mad and stabbed the replacement galleymate. Six months later he returned, but in poor health.

In 1932 he returned to Christ Church, Claremont, initially as Priest-in-Charge and then as Rector (1933-1943). His health worsened when he drove head-on into a tram in 1933, suffering as a result some fractured ribs. Later in 1933 Bell founded the Western Australian branch of the Oxford Group. In 1937 Percy Robinson gave Bell the rural property of Undercliffe in Greenmount, which Bell then converted into a convalescent home. During his incumbency at Christ Church, in 1938 the tower was completed. Also in 1938 he was made a Canon of St George's Cathedral.

While he was Rector of Claremont, he began weekly radio broadcasts on Radio 6AM and 6IX, becoming known as the "Radio Parson". During one of these broadcasts, in 1939, he prayed for the Pope (Pius XII), which, in the sectarian spirit of the day, caused immense controversy. Bell was a pacifist during the Second World War, and in 1940 he claimed that his views caused him to be censored during his radio broadcasts.

His next appointment was as Organising Secretary for the NSW branch of the Australian Board of Missions (1943-1948). During that time, in 1946, he was additionally appointed Dean of St Peter's Cathedral, Armidale. In 1948, thinking that his mother was dying, he left both posts to go to England, where he was Rector of Oddington with Adlestrop until 1952. Bell's mother did not die until 1955, but in the meantime he returned to Western Australia, initially to Undercliffe.

In 1953 he was appointed Dean of St George's Cathedral, after having been the locum for six months. Soon after his appointment as Dean, the church trustees proposed to demolish the Old Deanery, which had ceased to be used as a residence following the resignation of Bell's predecessor, the Very Rev Geoffrey Berwick. The Old Deanery was the oldest residential building remaining in central Perth, and an uproar ensued. The proposal was abandoned, and Bell himself paid for the essential repairs to the building from his own resources. He retired in 1959, remaining in Perth.

== Published work ==
Bell wrote a memoir about pilgrimage, Many Coloured Glass: The Story of a Pilgrimage, (1947: Tryst Publications).

== Personal life ==
Bell died in 1983, aged 84, and was cremated at Karrakatta Cemetery. He was unmarried.
