= Wollaston College =

Anglican theological college in Australia

Wollaston Theological College
- Type: Theological college
- Established: 1957
- Campus: Mount Claremont, Western Australia
- Website: wtc.perth.anglican.org

Wollaston College (formerly John Wollaston Theological College ) is an Australian educational institution in Perth, Western Australia, established in 1957. It provides tertiary-level courses in theological education, offers higher-degree level research supervision, and professional development opportunities in theology and leadership for those working in Anglican schools and agencies, as well as forms candidates for ordination in the Anglican Church of Australia. Wollaston Theological College is a constituent college of the University of Divinity.

== Origins ==
The first theological college for the Perth diocese was St John's College, founded by Charles Lefroy in 1899 and which closed in 1929. From its closure in 1929 to the opening of Wollaston in 1957, 49 candidates were sent to the Eastern States for theological training: 23 to St Barnabas' College, Adelaide, 14 to St John's College, Morpeth, six to St Michael's House, Crafers, three to Ridley College, Melbourne, two to St Francis's College, Brisbane, and one to Moore College, Sydney.

In 1950 the Perth Diocesan Synod resolved to establish a theological college. In 1956 the City of Perth agreed to sell five acres to the Diocese, and in the same year the Rev Tony Pierce was appointed first warden. Archbishop Moline's intention was to have a college that was neither 'high' nor 'low' in its churchmanship. The college was located in the Perth suburb of Mount Claremont. Its centrepiece was the chapel designed by noted architect Julius Elischer, influenced by Le Corbusier's Notre-Dame du Haut in Ronchamp, France. The founding and only warden of this period of full-time post-secondary residential theological education was C. A. Pierce, chaplain of Magdalene College, Cambridge.

== Courses and programs ==
From 1957 to 1970 ordinands from Perth and the other Western Australian dioceses undertook a largely residential program based on Wollaston, typically studying for the Licentiate or Diploma in Theology of the Australian College of Theology. The course program changed significantly over the years. Initially the intention was that students should complete the ThL (Licentiate in Theology) in the first two years of residence, followed by a third year of Honours.

In 1970 under new archbishop Geoffrey Sambell the Diocese of Perth changed its policy, with the result that the first two years of training for ordination candidates were spent at a residential theological college elsewhere in Australia, followed by a third year of practical training based at Wollaston with ordination to the diaconate at the start of that year. This directly led to the resignation of Pierce as warden. For more than a decade students from Western Australia were again sent away to study, and the Wollaston campus became in large part a retreat and conference centre for the diocese. While the name "John Wollaston Theological College" was retained, wardens of this period were administrators sometimes engaged in retreat conducting and spiritual direction, as well as working with the deacon interns and in post-ordination training.

When local theological education recommenced in 1983 in conjunction with the Perth College of Divinity and Murdoch University at the initiative of Archbishop Peter Carnley, Wollaston again become a centre for local formation of degree-seeking students, but on a non-resident basis and not as the primary center for teaching. It has continued in this mode, with some changes in specific programs; in 2020 Murdoch University announced its intention to cease theological teaching and Wollaston announced a partnership with the Theological School of Trinity College, Melbourne, to teach for degrees of the University of Divinity.

In 2022, Wollaston Theological College became a full constituent college of the University of Divinity and offers a range of fully accredited undergraduate and postgraduate awards. Its current faculty and honorary affiliates produce peer-reviewed research in leading international journals and monograph series. In 2024, more than 30,000 volumes in theology and related disciplines from the library at Murdoch University were transferred to the library at Wollaston College.

== Chapel ==
The chapel, which has no dedication, is the dominant feature of the college site. It was designed by the Hungarian-born Perth architect, Julius Elischer. There is no set place for the altar or any furniture, to enable it to be configured in multiple ways. The design is based strongly on Le Corbusier's Chapel of Notre-Dame du Haut in Ronchamp, built ten years earlier. (Elischer had worked under Ferninand Streb, a pupil of Le Corbusier's.) Like Notre Dame du Haut, the stark white interior is punctuated by deep-set windows of different coloured glass. The architect's vision was of a 'tent of meeting'. It was consecrated in April 1965 by Michael Ramsey, the then Archbishop of Canterbury.

In 2023 the chapel was awarded the Richard Roach Jewell Award for Enduring Architecture by the WA Chapter of the Australian Institute of Architects, recognising its design, longevity and cultural significance. Reverend Dr Raewynne J. Whiteley, Warden of Wollaston Theological College accepted the award alongside the architect's wife and daughter.

== Wardens and Principal ==
- Claude Anthony Pierce, 1956—1970
- Richard Franklin Appleby, 1972—1975 Appleby was subsequently Dean of Bathurst, 1980–83, Assistant Bishop of Newcastle, 1983–92, Bishop of the Northern Territory, 1992—1999.
- David Oswald Robarts, 1976—1979 Robarts was subsequently Dean of Perth, 1979—1989.
- John Warren Forsyth, 1979—1982
- Dennis John Reynolds, 1983—1985
- George Edward Trippe, 1985—1990
- Roger Thomas Sharr, 1992—2000
- Nigel Leaves, 2000—2009
- ?, 2009—2015
- Gregory John Norman Search, 2015—2020
- Ric Barrett-Lennard, 2021 (acting)
- Raewynne Whiteley, July 2022—April 2024
- Megan Warner, November 2024—Present (as Principal).

== Current faculty ==
- Chloe Anastasia
- Associate Professor Mark Jennings
- Associate Professor Robert Myles
- Dr Megan Warner
