= St John's Theological College, Perth =

Former Anglican college in Western Australia

St John's Theological College, Perth (initially known as the Clergy Training College, Perth) was an Australian educational institution in Perth Western Australia, established in 1899 and which closed in 1929. It trained candidates for ordination in the Church of England in Australia.

== Origins ==
The second Bishop of Perth was Henry Hutton Parry, from 1876 to 1893. Parry wished to establish a theological college. At some point between his installation in Perth in 1876 and 1881, he opened his home to four theological students, whom he instructed, with a view to ordination. These efforts appear to have petered out.

== Establishment ==
Parry's successor as Bishop of Perth (first Archbishop from 1914) was Charles Owen Leaver Riley (1894-1929). A priest in the diocese, Charles Lefroy, was instrumental in persuading Riley of the need for a theological college. In 1898 the Perth diocesan synod resolved to establish a theological college, and the Clergy Training College was opened the following year with Lefroy as Principal and with two students.

The college took up occupation of part of The Cloisters, and in 1909 changed its name to St John's Theological College.

== Closure ==
At the outbreak of war in 1914, the college closed, as all of the students enlisted. At that point The Cloisters was converted into a hostel for undergraduates of the University of Western Australia. In 1919 a new college council was formed, and a new Principal appointed in 1920. At that point the college moved to Beaufort Street in Highgate. In 1922 there was a concerted effort for fundraising, but by 1926 there were no students at St John's, and a decision was taken to close. The intention was that it be replaced by St George's College, along the lines of Trinity College, Melbourne and Trinity College Theological School: a residential college within a university but which also offered theological education for ordinands. Although St George's was opened, and remains a residential college of UWA, it never offered theological education.

== Wollaston College ==
Training for ordination recommenced in Perth in 1957, with the establishment of Wollaston College.

== Principals ==
- Charles Lefroy, 1899-1904
- Cuthbert Hudleston, 1904-1906
- Charles Edward John Chennell, 1906-1907 (acting)
- Charles Hugh Duffy Grimes, 1907-1919 Grimes was subsequently Chaplain of Christ Church, Vienna (1934-1938) including during the Anschluss, and proceeded to baptise 900 Jews, thereby saving them from arrest.
- Lionel Walpole Parry, 1920-1922 (and acting Principal thereafter). Parry was the son of Bishop Parry. He left the college to become Headmaster of Christ Church Grammar School, Claremont, Western Australia (1923-32).

== Notable alumni ==
- John Bell, Dean of St Peter's Cathedral, Armidale (1946-1948) and St George's Cathedral, Perth (1953-1959).
