= Edmund Hudleston =

Royal Air Force Air Chief Marshal (1908–1994)

Sir Edmund Hudleston
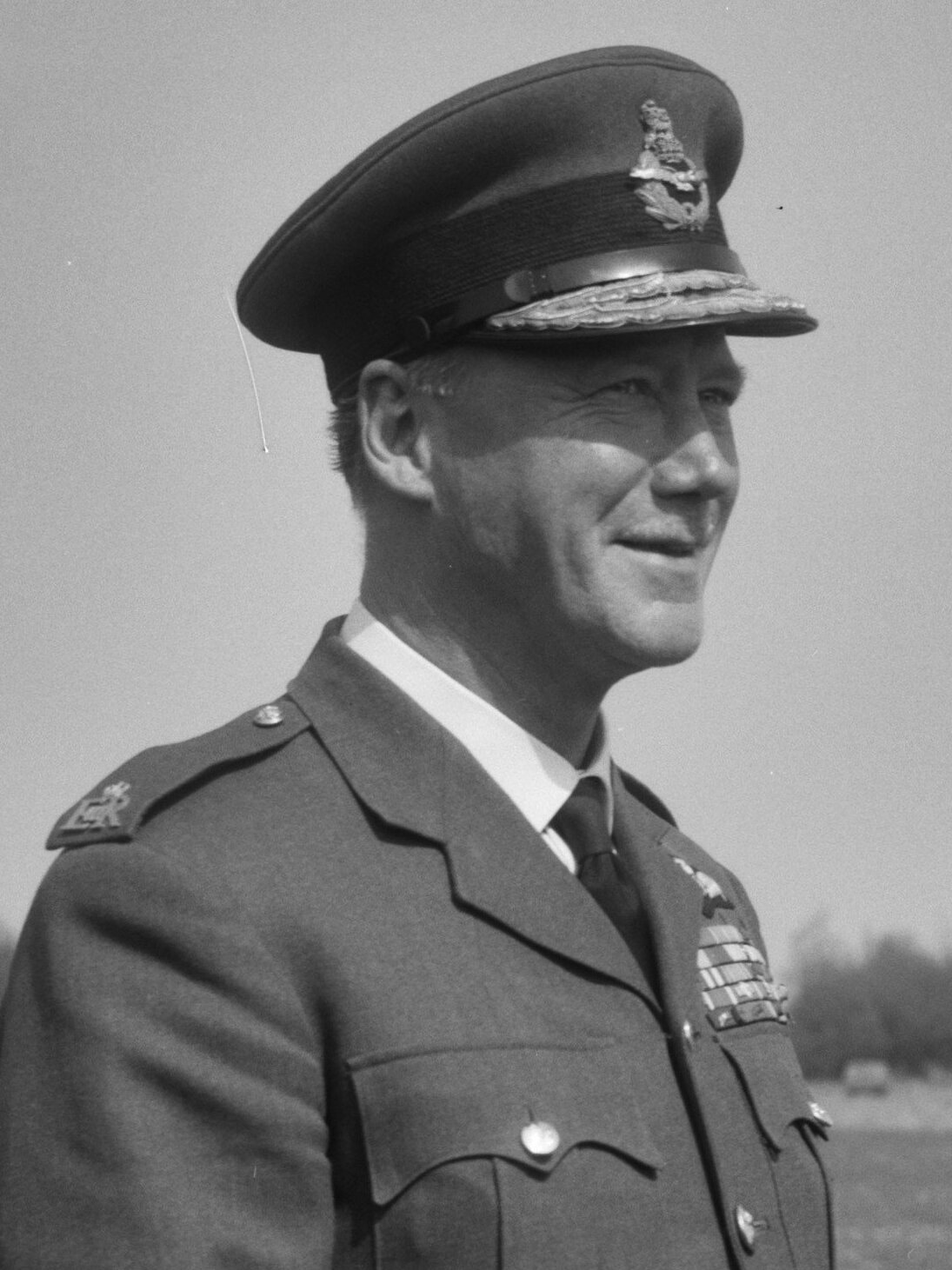
- Sir Edmund Hudleston (1964)
- Born: 30 December 1908; Kalgoorlie, Western Australia
- Died: 14 December 1994 (aged 85); East Sussex
- Burial place: Greystoke, Cumbria
- Military career
- Allegiance: United Kingdom
- Branch: Royal Air Force
- Service years: 1927–67
- Rank: Air Chief Marshal
- Nickname: Phoenix
- Commands: Allied Air Forces Central Europe (1963–64); Transport Command (1962–63); Vice-Chief of the Air Staff (1957–62); No. 3 Group (1953–56); No. 1 Group (1950–51); No. 84 Group (1944–46)
- Conflicts: North-West Frontier; Second World War; Suez Crisis
- Awards: Knight Grand Cross of the Order of the Bath; Commander of the Order of the British Empire; Mentioned in Despatches (5); Commander of the Legion of Merit (United States); Commander of the Order of the Crown (Belgium); Croix de guerre (Belgium); Grand Officer of the Order of Orange-Nassau (Netherlands); Officer of the Legion of Honour (France); Croix de Guerre (France)

Air Chief Marshal Sir Edmund Cuthbert Hudleston, GCB, CBE, ADC (30 December 1908 – 14 December 1994) was a senior commander in the Royal Air Force.

== RAF career ==
The son of the Rev Cuthbert Hudleston, sometime Archdeacon of Perth, Western Australia Hudleston was born in Kalgoorlie and educated at Guildford Grammar School in Western Australia, Hudleston joined the Royal Air Force in 1927. He served as an armament officer in India before attending the RAF Staff College, Andover in 1938. During World War II he served in various senior staff officer positions at RAF Middle East Command and Desert Air Force before being appointed Air Officer Commanding No. 84 Group in 1944.

After the war, Hudleston attended the Imperial Defence College before becoming Head of the UK Military Delegation to the Western European Union Military Staff's Committee in 1948 and Deputy Chief of Staff for Plans & Policy at Headquarters SHAPE in 1951. He was made Air Officer Commanding No. 3 Group in 1953 and then became an instructor at the Imperial Defence College in 1956 before being appointed Chief of Staff (Air) for Operation Musketeer, the operation to recover the Suez Canal. He went on to be Vice-Chief of the Air Staff in 1957, Air Officer Commanding-in-Chief at RAF Transport Command in 1962 and Commander of Allied Air Forces Central Europe in 1963. His last appointment was as Deputy Commander-in-Chief, Allied Forces Central Europe in 1964 before retiring in 1967.

In retirement he became a Director at the Optical Division of Pilkington Brothers.

== Family ==
In 1936 he married Nancye Davis; they had one son, Anthony, from whom three grandchildren, Marina, Nicholas & Valerie and one daughter, Sally from whom two grandchildren, Cecilia & Lucinda. Following the death of Nancye in 1980, he married Brenda Withrington. She died in 2020.

Military offices
Preceded by Sir Ronald Ivelaw-Chapman	Vice-Chief of the Air Staff; 1957–1962	Succeeded by Sir Wallace Kyle
Preceded by Sir Denis Barnett	Commander-in-Chief Transport Command; 1962–1963	Succeeded by Sir Kenneth Cross
Preceded by The Earl of Bandon	Commander Allied Air Forces Central Europe; 1963–1964	Succeeded by Johannes Steinhoff; Chief of Staff and acting Commander
