= The Deanery, Perth =

Heritage-listed building in Western Australia

The Deanery
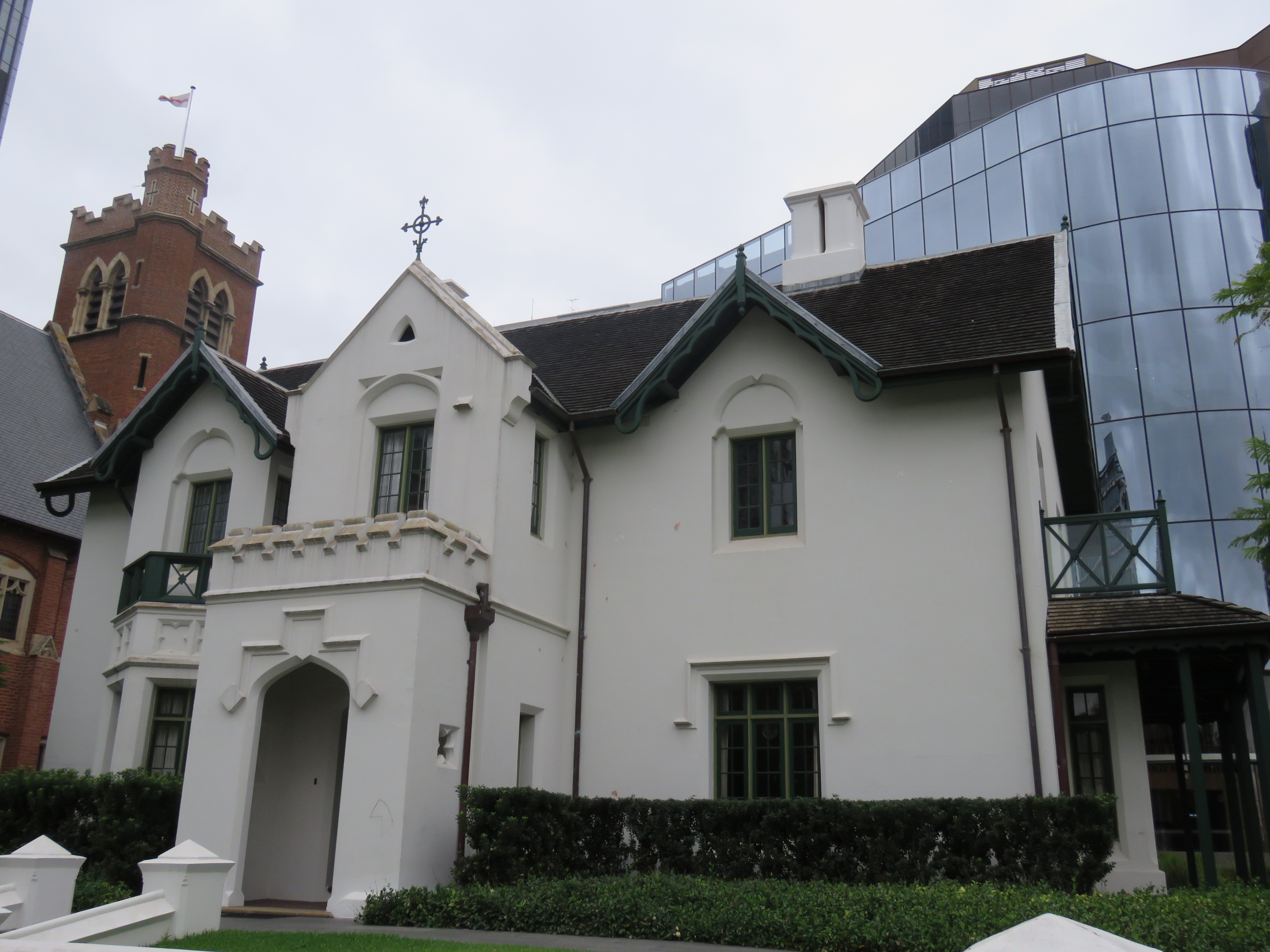
- The Deanery in March 2022
- Interactive map of the The Deanery area

General information
- Type: Office
- Location: Perth, Western Australia
- Coordinates: 31.9561°S 115.8615°E

Western Australia Heritage Register
- Type: State Registered Place
- Designated: 1 December 1995
- Reference no.: 2100

The Deanery is located on St Georges Terrace, at the intersection of St Georges Terrace and Pier Street, Perth, Western Australia.

It was built in the late 1850s, as a residence and office for the first Dean of Perth, Reverend George Pownall. The Deanery is one of the few remaining houses of this period in Western Australia, and it is now used as offices for the Anglican Church.

== History ==
In 1855, Pownall succeeded John Burdett Wittenoom as Colonial Chaplain and in 1857, following the Right Reverend Mathew Blagden Hale's consecration as the first Bishop of Perth became the first Dean of the new Saint George's Cathedral in Perth. He initially lived in rented accommodation but Bishop Hale agreed to the urgent need to build Pownall's Parsonage.

The site for The Deanery was formerly the site of the old Perth Gaol, but the land was exchanged with the Crown in July 1858, so that The Deanery could be built close to the Cathedral.

The old Perth Gaol had been used to house Aboriginal prisoners, and on 16 May 1833, Yagan's father respected Aboriginal elder Midgegooroo, who was captured days earlier, was executed on site without trial by a firing squad of soldiers of the 63rd Regiment. It is also thought that the town stocks once stood in the grounds of The Deanery.

Pownall had a keen interest in architecture, and this interest was to substantially influence the design of The Deanery. He was a member of the Ecclesiological Society, and a former member of the Camden Society, which promoted the revival of Gothic architecture and an academic study of the style. The Deanery exhibits a number of the attributes of this style of architecture which have been attributed to Pownall's influence, although the architect responsible for construction was Richard Roach Jewell.

In a letter to the Colonial Secretary, Pownall wrote: "The whole expense of carrying out the excellent plan prepared by Mr. Jewell would be about £900." The cost of the building was met by the government paying £300, public subscriptions raising £300, and the Anglican Church contributing £300, in total equivalent to A$95,800 in 2022. The building was constructed by former convicts, who had been granted a ticket of leave, reflecting Pownall and Hale's views on convictism.

Pownall moved into The Deanery in November 1859, and the building was used continuously as a residence for over ninety years. In 1918, 1932 and 1936 the building was renovated and some minor alterations were made in keeping with changes in living standards in the community.

In 1953, the church trustees proposed that the building be demolished, and that the church build a ten-storey office block on the site. Following a storm of protests from the public The Deanery was reprieved. An appeal was opened, and the new Dean, John Bell, said "He hoped that those who complained about the proposal to demolish The Deanery would now show him some financial backing for his plans to preserve the structure for years to come." The appeal was successful and The Deanery was modernised and then used as part office and part residence by the Dean's secretary and by the assistant priests and their families and verger-caretakers.

In 1979, The Deanery was again in need of restoration as its condition had deteriorated, and an appeal was opened with the aim of raising $90,000. $95,736 was raised, of which $69,488 came through the National Trust. An extensive programme of restoration and conservation, including an attempt to restore the garden. Following the restoration, The Deanery was opened for the public on 8 May 1982, and since then it has been used as the Cathedral offices.

The Deanery was entered into the Register of the National Estate by the Australian Heritage Commission in March 1978, and classified by the National Trust of Australia (WA) in October 1980. On 1 December 1995 it was placed on the permanent state heritage register.

The Deanery had external restoration work in 2010 and 2011 and a much-needed upgrade on the internal fabric in 2017. The deanery gardens were completed in October 2017 and is the final link to the Cathedral Precinct.
