= Cuthbert Hudleston =

Cuthbert Hudleston (26 March 1863, in Madras – 31 December 1940, in Winchester) was an Anglican priest, most notably Archdeacon of Perth, Western Australia from 1910 until his death.

Hudleston was educated at New College, Oxford and ordained in 1887. He served curacies in Stepney and Walworth. He was Priest in charge at Norseman from 1898 to 1900 then Coolgardie until 1903. He was Rector of Kalgoorlie from 1903 to 1905; St John, Perth, 1905 to 1907 (during which time he was also Principal of the Clergy Training College); and St Alban, Perth 1907 to 1919.

His son was a senior commander in the Royal Air Force.
