= Julius Elischer =

Australian architect (1918–2004)

- Born: 5 September 1918; Budapest, Hungary
- Died: 12 February 2004 (aged 85); Nedlands, Western Australia, Australia
- Occupation: Architect
- Children: Julian Elischer Nicole Elischer Francesca Elischer William Karl Elischer

Julius William Elischer (5 September 1918 – 12 February 2004) born Gyula Vilmos Elischer, was a Hungarian-born Australian architect. Elischer emigrated to Melbourne, Australia, in 1951 and, in 1957, moved to Perth, where he worked until his retirement in 1986.

== Biography ==
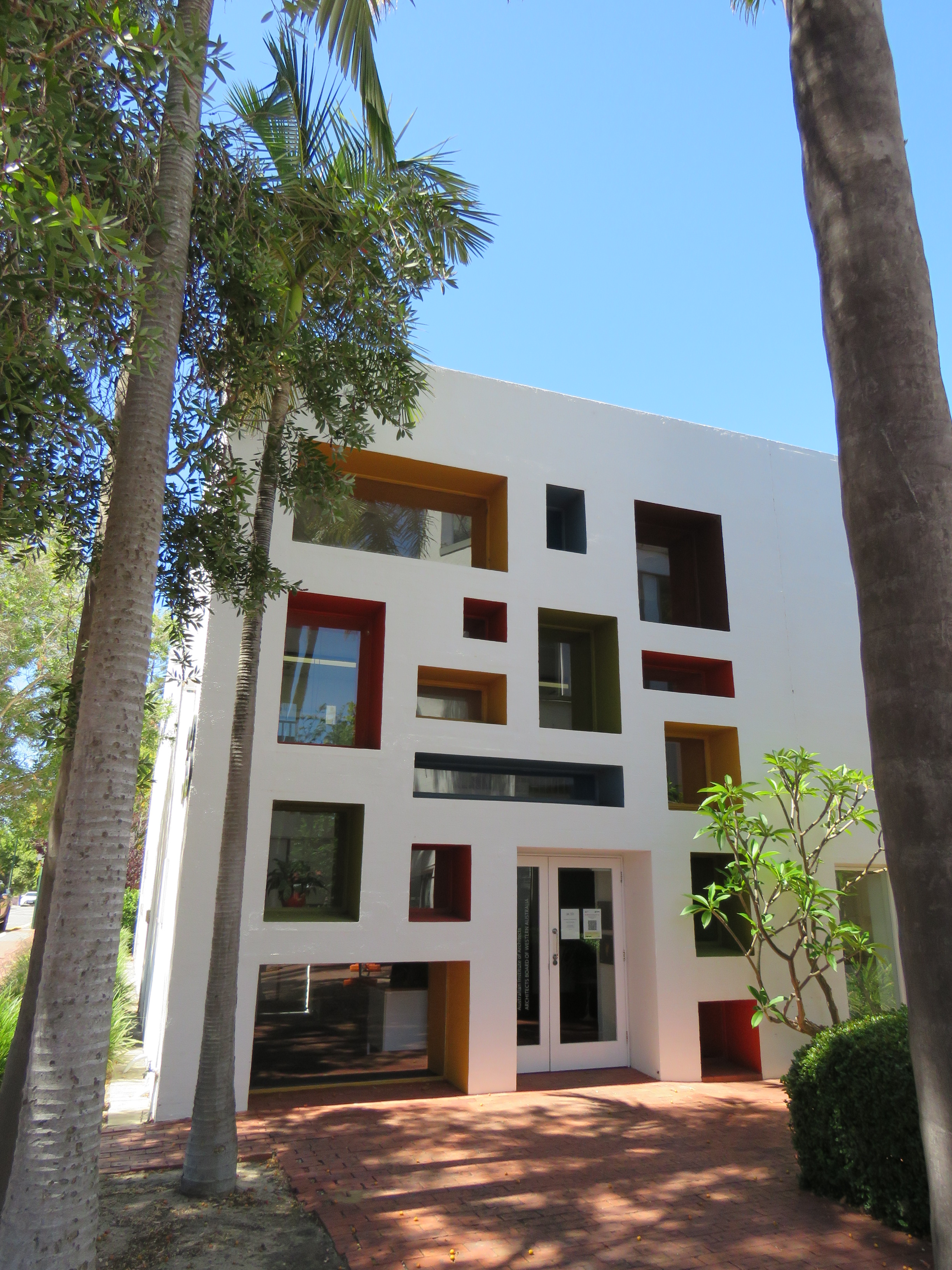
The former David Foulkes-Taylor Showroom, now the Western Australian headquarter of the Australian Institute of Architects, designed by Elischer in 1964

Elischer was born in Budapest in 1918, the son of Gyula Elischer (1875–1929), a prominent Hungarian radiologist, and his wife, Ágota Petschacher. His father died when Elischer was eleven years old, with his uncle supporting his further upbringing. He graduated from the prestigious Fasori Gimnázium in 1936 and obtained a degree in architecture in 1942.

=== World War Two ===
Elischer served as a reserve officer in the Hungarian Army during World War II, taking part in the invasion of the Soviet Union. He was part of a reconnaissance unit, one of the first Hungarian units to cross into the Soviet Union. His experience there of Stalinist communism made him an anti-communist without ever sympathising with the fascist Hungarian Arrow Cross Party or its policies against the countries Jews. Elischer had witnessed the treatment of Jews in Germany during a visit in 1942 and had been revolted.

During the Siege of Budapest, in late 1944, Elischer served as a Lieutenant and official commander of the Royal Hungarian I Honvéd University Assault Battalion. Recruited from students, it had been formed as a unit of the Hungarian Army on 5 October 1944 with a strength of 500 soldiers. On 28 December 1944, Elischer and about 20 members of his inexperienced battalion were sent to relieve a German unit in the defense of Budapest. Soon after their arrival, Elischer was hit by Soviet sniper bullets in the shoulder and near the spine and had to be evacuated to hospital. As a consequence, Elischer lost a lung, the wound later forcing him to give up a position as a lecturer at the Cornell University in New York, which he held during the 1950s, as the climate affected his health.

=== Move to Australia ===
Elischer fled Hungary for the West in 1945 and worked as an architect in post-war West Germany until emigrating to Melbourne, Australia, in 1951.

In 1957, Elischer moved to Perth, Western Australia, first working as an architectural draughtsman, until he opened an architectural office in 1963. In Western Australia, Elischer became known for his high-standard designs which could be built economically. He designed many public buildings, including churches, schools and civic buildings as well as retirement villages. In his designs, he emphasised the use of low-cost building materials. Much of Elischer's prominent design work as a Perth Modernist was in his home suburb of Nedlands, along Broadway and Kingsway. Elischer himself lived at 28 Kingsway while his studio was at 97 Broadway.

=== Academic career ===
Elischer became a lecturer in design at the University of Western Australia in the 1970s and eventually retired in 1986, although his staff continued to operate his office until 1991. He died in Nedlands in February 2004, aged 85.

=== Personal life ===
Elischer married Barbara Beverly in 1958 and the couple had four children, two sons and two daughters, born between 1959 and 1968. Of these, the third child, Francesca, also became an interior architect.

== Honours and recognition ==
In his honour, the Royal Australian Institute of Architects created the Julius Elischer Award for Interior Architecture and purchased a building designed by him as their West Australian headquarters at 33 Broadway, Nedlands. The building is state heritage listed and was originally built as a showroom for David Foulkes-Taylor for the works of young local artists. Another heritage listed work of Elischer is the Melvista Lodge & Nursing Home, also located in Nedlands.

In 2023 the WA Chapter of the AIA awarded 1965 Wollaston College Chapel the Richard Roach Jewell Award for Enduring Architecture 58 years after it was completed.
