= The Cloisters (Perth) =

Building in Perth, Western Australia

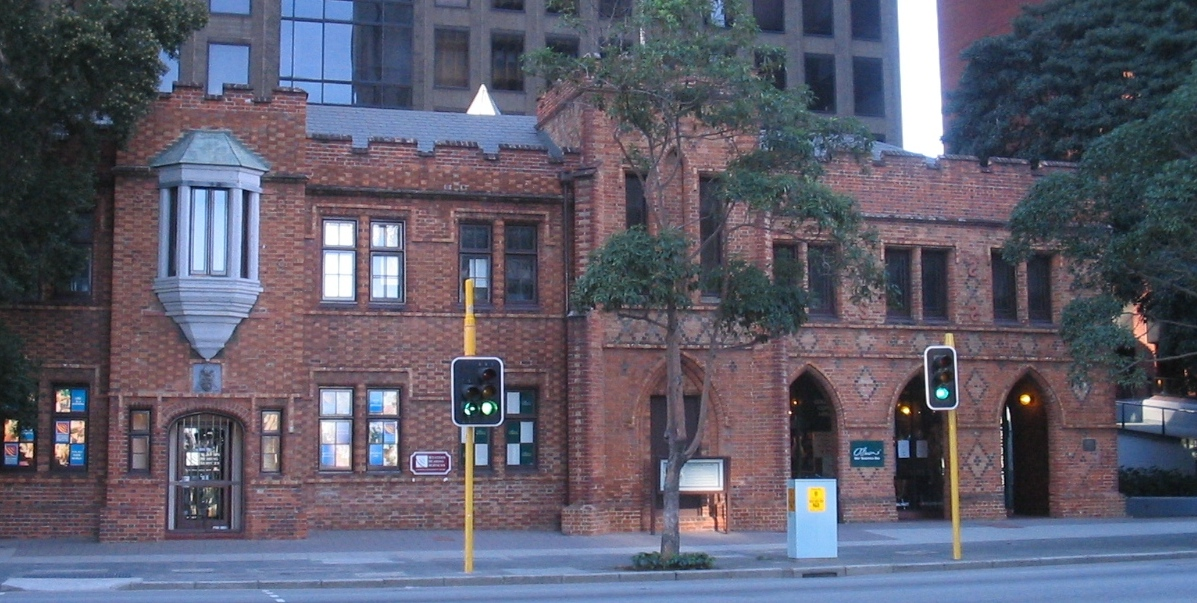
- The Cloisters frontage onto St Georges Terrace
- Interactive map of the The Cloisters area

General information
- Type: Heritage listed building
- Location: Perth, Western Australia
- Coordinates: 31°57′12″S 115°51′11″E

Western Australia Heritage Register
- Type: State Registered Place
- Designated: 20 October 1995
- Reference no.: 2119

The Cloisters is located at 200 St Georges Terrace, opposite the intersection with Mill Street in Perth, Western Australia. It is a two-storey dark coloured brick building, which terminates the vista at the top of Mill Street and is a landmark in the rise of the street to the ridge of the plateau.

The Cloisters is one of a small number of remaining convict-built colonial buildings of the mid-nineteenth century in the central area of Perth.

== History ==
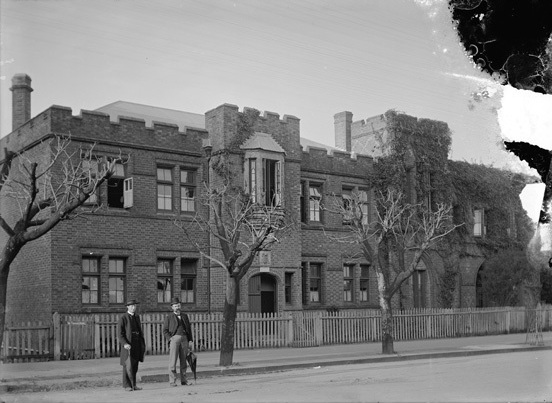
The Cloisters, c. 1900, from an almost identical position as present-day image

It was designed by Richard Roach Jewell for Bishop Mathew Blagden Hale and constructed in 1858 as a secondary school for boys. It was established and funded with a grant from the Society for Promoting Christian Knowledge and Bishop Hale's own donation. The school was called the Perth Church of England Collegiate School (colloquially known as Bishop Hale's School), and was the first secondary school established in the Swan River Colony.

The architectural style of the building was derived from St. James's Palace, Hampton Court, parts of Eton College, and Fulham Palace. The Tudor embellishments tied the structure to the history of the English monarchy (the head of the Church which Hale served) while signifying the power and authority of England under which government the colony was founded, the gothic features signifying the moral and temporal authority of the Church. Students at the school included John Forrest, who became the first Premier of Western Australia and then Federal Treasurer, Alexander Forrest who become the Lord Mayor of Perth, Stephen Henry Parker, Sir Edward Wittenoom, Frank Wittenoom, Maitland Brown, William Samson, John Bateman, Fredrick Brockman, George Roe and Augustus Roe.

Bishop Hale's crest

In 1865, administration of the school was taken up by the Anglican Church. In 1872, the boys school activities were relocated in another building further east on St Georges Terrace, and the building was used as a school for girls. In 1879–80, additions were constructed on the western side of the building (comprising further classrooms and dormitories above). By the late 1890s, the school closed due to declining student numbers and the construction of government funded schools. The Diocesan Trustees divided the building in half with brick partitioning, and rented out the two sections as private residences. The eastern half of the building became a boarding house and, in 1904, was first referred to as the Cloisters. The western side of the building was used as a college for the clergy, established by Archdeacon Charles Lefroy and, by 1909, this portion was known as St John's College. The western half continued to be used as a theological college until 1918, when the whole building was used as a hostel for the recently established University of Western Australia.

During the late 1960s the owners made plans to demolish the Cloisters, and redevelop the site. However the Cloisters was saved by a business deal. The developers had to restore the Cloisters to its original splendour, in exchange for being allowed to construct a bigger building behind it.

In 1971, the Cloisters was restored and adapted for use as a commercial outlet at a cost of A$100,000, equivalent to A$1.2 million in 2022, incorporated into the project was the retention of the nearby Port Jackson fig tree (which was planted in 1887 by a tenant of the Cloisters). The building and façades were retained and restored, albeit with plate glass windows to the openings of the Cloisters. The interior of the building was gutted to create additional office space.

The building was first classified by the National Trust in 1973 and together with the Port Jackson fig tree was placed on the permanent state heritage register on 20 October 1995. With the completion of the Mount Newman Mining Company offices in early 1971 behind the Cloisters the area is now known as Cloisters Square.

== Current uses ==
As of April 2020 the building is vacant.
