= Lionel Parry =

Lionel Walpole Parry (1883–1954) was an Anglican priest and educator.

Parry was the son of Henry Parry, Bishop of Perth 1876–93. He was educated at Exeter College, Oxford and ordained in 1908. After a curacy in Lowestoft he went as a teacher at Guildford Grammar School, Perth. He was briefly Principal of St John's Theological College, Perth (1920–22) and then in 1923 he became Headmaster of Christ Church Grammar School, Perth; and in 1940 Archdeacon of Perth, WA. He retired in 1953.
