= Richard Roach Jewell =

English architect and settler of Western Australia

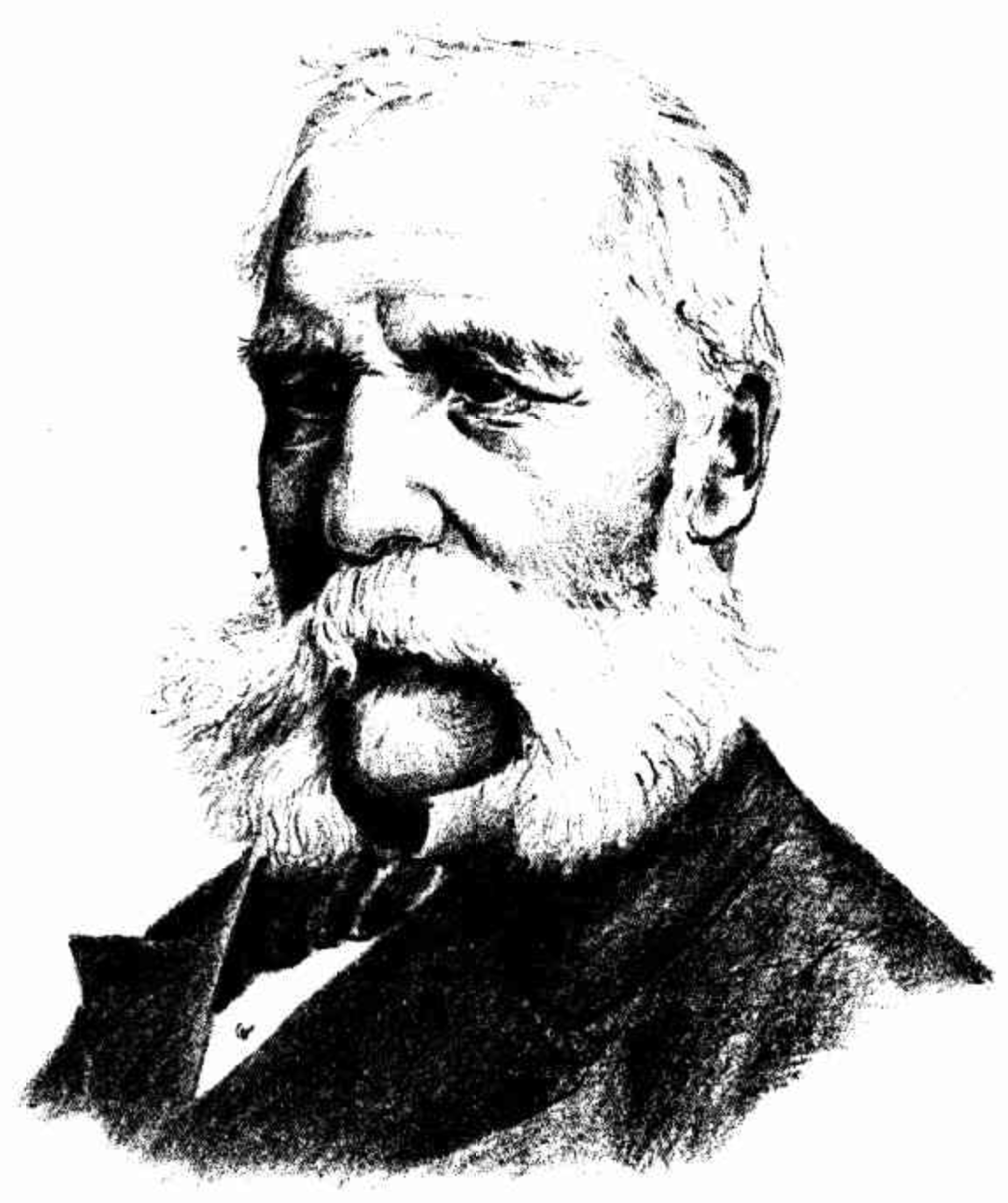
- Jewell in 1888
- Born: 1810 (Baptised 12 May 1810); Barnstaple, Devon, England
- Died: 1 June 1891 (aged 80–81); Perth, Western Australia, Australia
- Occupation: Architect
- Spouse: Eliza Jane Andrews (m. 1845; died 1884)
- Parent(s): John Jewell, Margaret Jewell

Richard Roach Jewell (1810–1891) was an architect who designed many of the important public buildings in Perth, Western Australia, during the latter half of the nineteenth century. He was employed to supervise many major building projects around England, churches in Bristol, Cardiff, Clifton, Eye, Horsley and Stroudswater. As well as churches he also supervised construction of Stanstead College, a military prison in Gosport and fortifications at Portland Castle and Southsea Castle. He was also employed as a clerk of works in the offices of Charles Barry.

== Biography ==
=== Early life ===
Richard Roach Jewell was born in 1810 in Barnstaple, Devon, England. He was trained as an architect and builder in Barnstaple in Devonshire.

=== Western Australia ===
In 1852 Jewell emigrated to Western Australia to seek a more temperate climate for his frail wife. They arrived in Fremantle, Western Australia aboard Will Watch on 24 February 1852.

Jewell was initially employed in the Imperial Convict Establishment, which was established to manage British convicts which had started arriving in 1850. The Fremantle-based Convict Establishment was responsible for many large constructions in the colony with an already well established design department in the offices of the Royal Engineers headed by James Manning as Clerk of Works. Jewell soon transferred to the expanding Department of Public Works based in Perth and was appointed foreman in January 1853 at a salary of £150, equivalent to A$23,121.47 in 2022. In a letter to family in England dated 4 February Jewell commented on his salary:

I only get the £150 and no allowance for lodging, but taking into consideration the differences in prices of provisions and house rent (as it much cheaper here than at Fremantle) it makes but a few pounds a year difference. I like my situation much altho my duties call forth all my exertions to keep them well and faithfully performed.

In the same letter Jewell wrote of his position and future aspirations;

You probably may think that I rank rather low by only being able to write at the end of my name F.P.W. Why is it, we have no clerk of works for the local Govt. and altho F.P.W I stand second in command, and first preferment, which I trust is not far distant, will then bring me to the top of the tree...

He did not have long to wait, for in June 1853 the Superintendent of Public Works, James Austin resigned after a long-running battle with Governor Charles Fitzgerald over pay and conditions. Jewell was appointed to the position at an increased salary of £175 with an additional £25 for being Superintendent of Towns.

=== Superintendent of Public Works ===
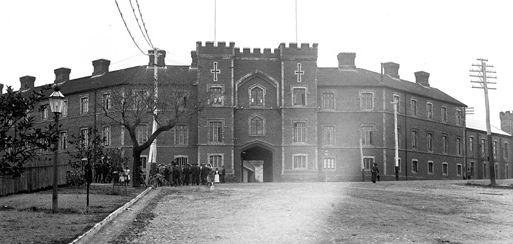
Pensioners' Barracks in 1905 designed by Jewell in 1863

Jewell's duties initially included overseeing repairs of buildings, roads and bridges, and supervising the construction of the boys' schools in Perth and Fremantle. He was soon given the task of designing major buildings such as Perth Gaol and the court-house. Jewell was said to have worked hard and long into the night with his book-keeping duties. In 1853 he wrote to Governor Fitzgerald:

I have the honour to submit for the consideration and approval off His Excellency the Governor that he will be pleased to grant an allowance for candles used in writing the Public accounts done after office hours, as it is impossible to get the same performed during the day without neglecting other duties...

With the arrival of 300 convicts and ticket of leave persons, Perth had the labour necessary to commence building many substantial projects. The first of these that Jewell worked on were the Claisebrook Abattoirs, of which only drawings now survive, and the Colonial School on St Georges Terrace that now houses the National Trust of Australia. The Colonial School was built in two stages, the first being completed in 1854 and two wings being added in 1868 giving it a rough crucifix form. To provide for the convicts, Jewell designed the Perth Gaol in 1854. All of these building utilised limestone carted by barges from quarries at Rocky Bay.

In about November 1854, he also designed Holy Trinity Church, York, which is in brick and of Victorian Romanesque design, and is still standing.

==== The Cloisters ====
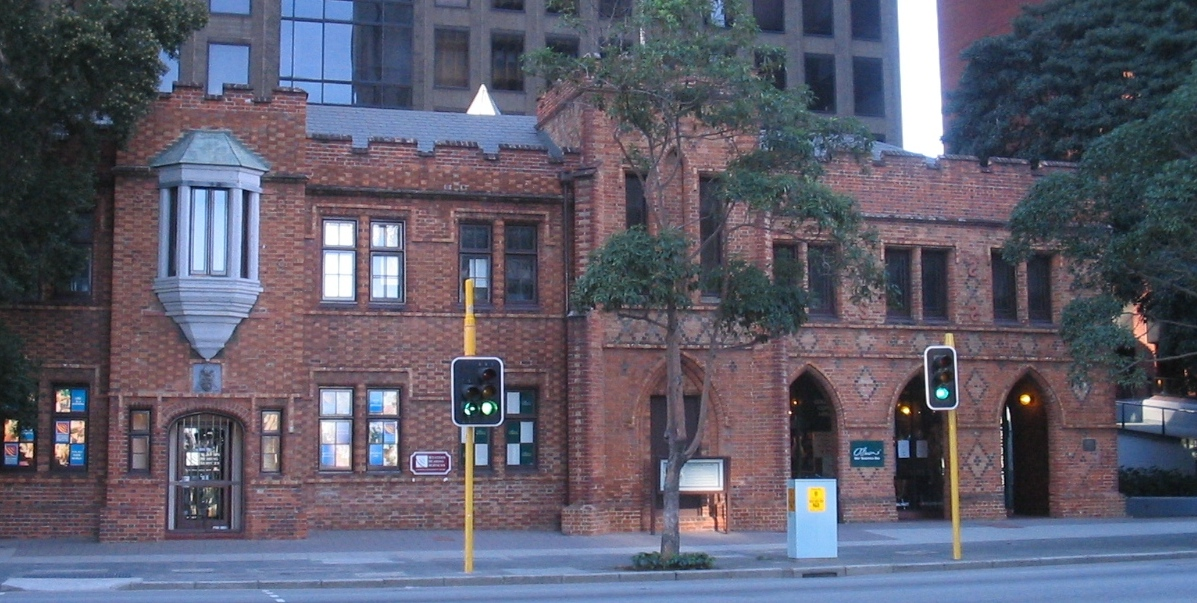
The Cloisters

With the colony lacking in funds Jewell also turned to brick construction in Perth. James Brittain had already established a brick yard in East Perth, supplying a wide range of wood fired bricks. The first major brick project by Jewell in Perth was Bishop Hale's Collegiate School of 1858. This building was designed based on a pattern already established with King's School in Parramatta, New South Wales and St Peters College in Adelaide, South Australia. Hale paid for the building of the school out of his own purse, requesting an English-Gothic design. The building became known as The Cloisters due to the effect of the ground floor verandahs.

The Cloisters uses a patterned brick style set in Flemish bond with diaper patterns to selected panels. The building was first classified by the National Trust in 1973, and together with the adjoining Port Jackson fig tree was placed on the permanent heritage register on 20 October 1995. The Cloisters is the oldest building designed by Jewell in Perth still standing at its original location. With the building of the Hammersley Iron offices in the early 1980s behind The Cloisters the area is now known as Cloisters Square.

==== Government House ====
Government house was designed by Officers of the Royal Engineers and James Manning with building commencing 1859. The Convict Establishment was based in Fremantle, so Jewell was appointed to supervise the construction. Jewell amended many of the details during construction, citing a common architectural ploy by continually commenting on the lack of information or drawings provided by Manning. This method enabled Jewell to substantially personalise the building to his tastes, with the building being completed in 1864.

==== Perth Town Hall ====
The Perth Town Hall built between 1867 and 1870, was to break from the normal Tudor Gothic designs by using a Flemish style of brick work with French influences. The overall designs are credited to Jewell though Manning was again involved with its building and its generally recognised that the roofing structure was Manning's designs.

==== Other buildings ====
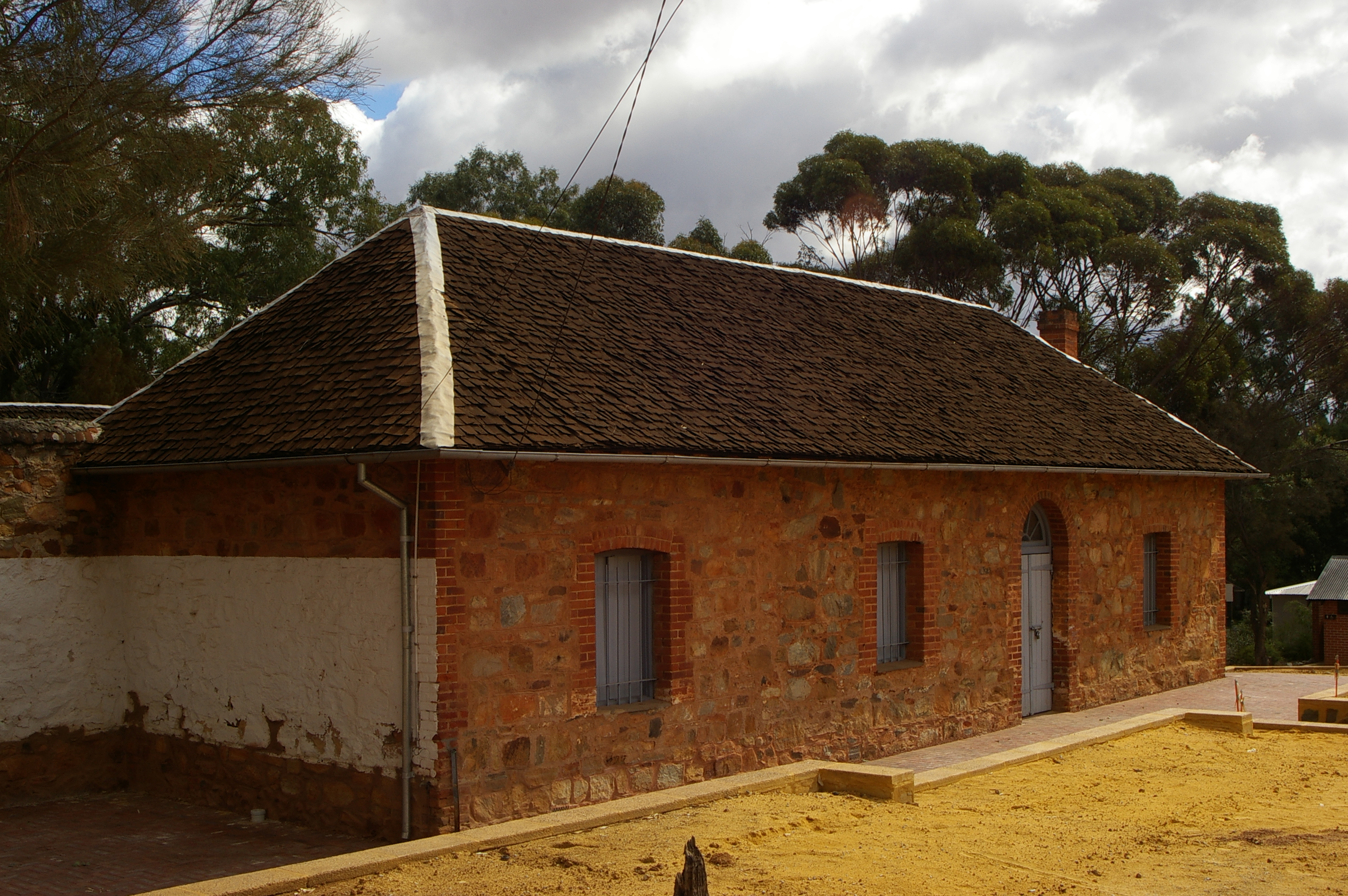
Old gaol now a museum in Toodyay

Jewell oversaw construction projects for over 30 years in Western Australia and many important buildings still standing were designed by him. In Perth, these include the Wesley Church, Public Trust Office, the Treasury Buildings, Pensioners' Barracks (Barracks Arch) and The Deanery. Outside Perth, notable buildings included Holy Trinity Church, 1855, and the Convent School in York, 1872; Court No 2 in the York Courthouse; Toodyay gaol, Roebourne residency and police station, Greenough police station and Geraldton hospital.

=== Retirement and death ===
With the death of his wife on 19 July 1884, Jewell retired and was replaced by George Temple-Poole then working in Ceylon. He died in Perth on 1 June 1891 and is buried in the East Perth Cemeteries near St Bartholomew's Church, another of his many designs.

== General references ==
- Architects of Australia edited by Howard Tanner, Richard Roach Jewell by Howard Tanner pg 38–42. published by Macmillan 1981 ISBN 0-333-29929-9
