= Heritage Council of Western Australia =

Heritage agency in Western Australia

The Heritage Council of Western Australia is the Government of Western Australia agency created to identify, conserve and promote places of cultural heritage significance in the state.

Prior to its creation, considerable variance in policy and political controversies arose over heritage issues in Western Australia, such as the Barracks Arch and the demolition of buildings in the Perth central business district.

It was preceded by the Western Australian Heritage Committee, which had been heavily involved in the 1988 Australian Bicentenary, and the setting up of the Western Australian Heritage Trails Network.

It was created under the Heritage of Western Australia Act 1990. The Council maintains the State Register of Heritage Places.

The council also records and lists places that are listed in Municipal Heritage Inventories which are significant in local communities – but which do not gain state-level status.

It is sometimes incorrectly confused with the National Trust of Australia (W.A.), a non-government body which also assesses and classifies heritage places and buildings for inclusion on its own register. It also quite distinct from the Perth City Council body Heritage Perth, which deals with the City of Perth heritage issues.

It has had various publications during its existence.

It is also involved in the annual WA Heritage Awards.

== See also ==
- History of Western Australia
- List of heritage buildings in Perth, Western Australia
- Minister for Heritage (Western Australia)
