= Charles Lefroy =

Charles Edward Cottrell Lefroy was an Anglican priest, most notably Archdeacon of Perth, Western Australia, from 1907 until 1912.

The son of an early settler to West Australia, Lefroy was educated at Bradfield College; Keble College, Oxford; and Ely Theological College. He was ordained deacon in 1889, and priest in 1890. He was an Assistant Master at Dulwich College from 1889 to 1893; Curate of Great Ilford from 1893 to 1896; Priest in charge of Swan District, Western Australia from 1888 to 1889; Principal of the Clergy Training College, Perth, from 1899 to 1904; Rector of Claremont from 1904 to 1918. After returning from Australia he held incumbencies at Chiddingfold and Hersham before retiring in 1927.

He died on 31 December 1940.
