= Barracks Arch =

Part of a former government barracks building in Perth, Western Australia

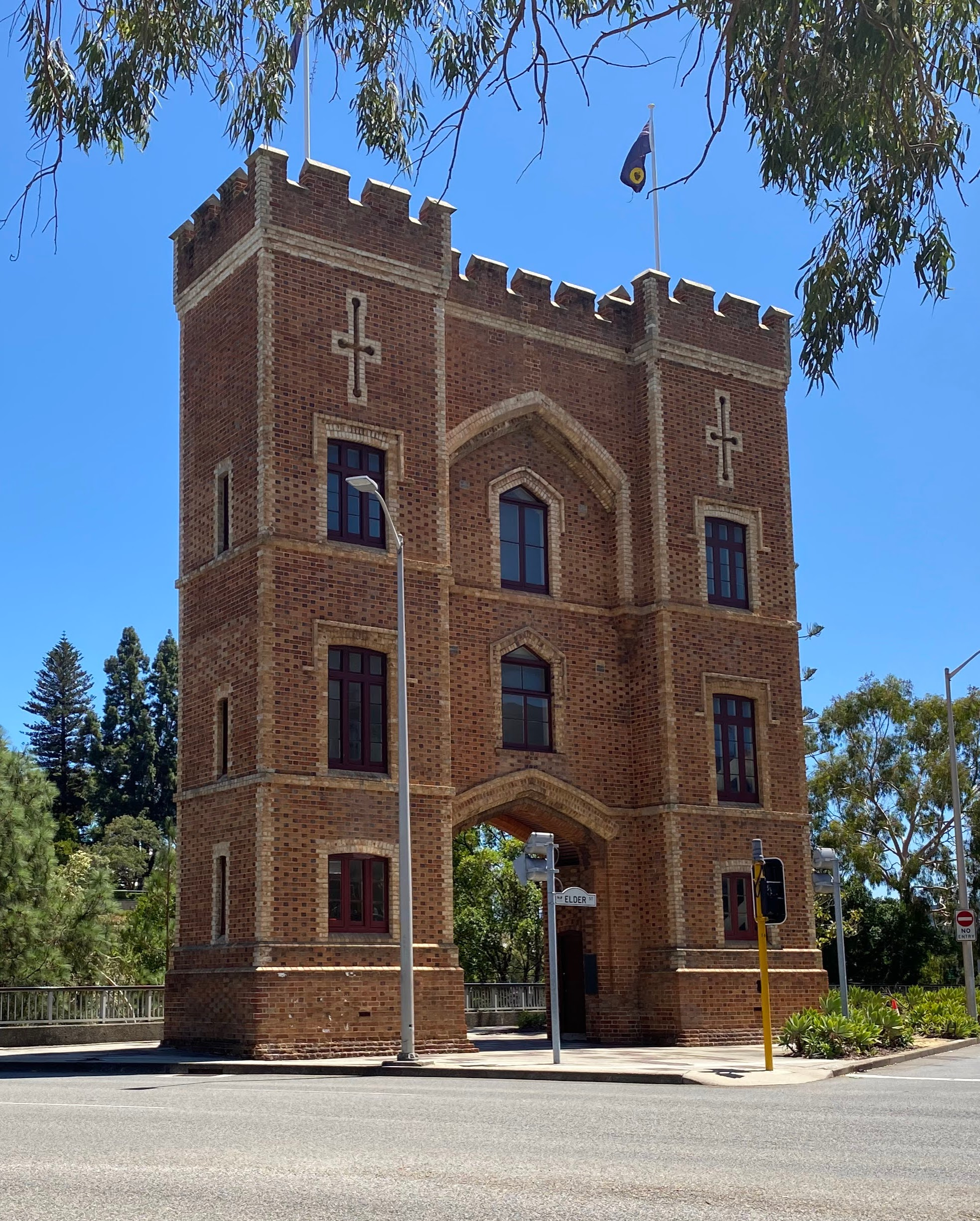
- The Barracks Arch in 2023

- Location within Perth
- The Barracks Arch (●) is located at the western terminus of St Georges Terrace, in front of Parliament House across the Mitchell Freeway.

General information
- Type: Heritage-listed building
- Location: St Georges Terrace, Perth, Western Australia
- Coordinates: 31°57′08″S 115°50′56″E

Western Australia Heritage Register
- Type: State Registered Place
- Designated: 22 June 2001
- Reference no.: 2120

The Barracks Arch is located on the corner of Malcolm and Elder Streets, at the western end of St Georges Terrace in Perth, Western Australia.

== The Barracks ==
Designed by Richard Roach Jewell, the Barracks were originally built from 1863 to 1866 to house the Enrolled Pensioner Force. The Enrolled Pensioner Force came to Australia as guards on convict ships, and were given small land grants in return for part-time guard work. The bulk of convict work moved from Fremantle to Perth in the 1860s, so there was a need to accommodate many Enrolled Pensioners and their families.

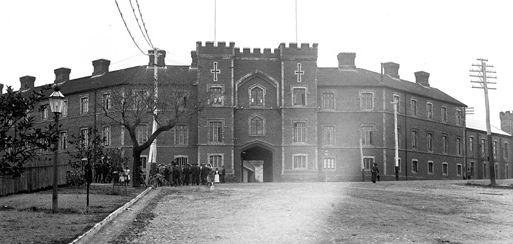
The Pensioner Barracks in 1905

Architect Jewell designed the three-storey building in Tudor style that resembled a medieval castle. The building was brick, rather than more expensive stone, and horizontal lines emphasised by using lines of paler colour bricks underneath the windows. The roof was made of timber shingles. The building was finished in 1866, and was later extended to house an additional 21 families. Each family apartment had two rooms, each about 4.0 by 3.4 metres (13 by 11 ft), with at least one fireplace. The outbuildings included a cookhouse, firing range and gun-room, wash-house, stores and stables, and a fives court constructed later.

A fire in 1887 destroyed the timber flooring of the east wing and the second floor of the central section. Water was pumped by hand pumps from the Swan River and brought by buckets through a chain of volunteers. The burnt sections were later restored.

The Barracks were gradually converted to offices for the Public Works Department (PWD) between 1900 and 1904, becoming its headquarters in 1904. Notable occupants included C. Y. O'Connor, whose office was immediately above the arch. The fives court housed the drawing office, and eventually connected to a mid-1920s addition for the Metropolitan Water Supply, Sewerage and Drainage department. The Public Works Department and Metropolitan Water Board moved to Dumas House in March 1966.

== Demolition of the Barracks and retention of the arch ==
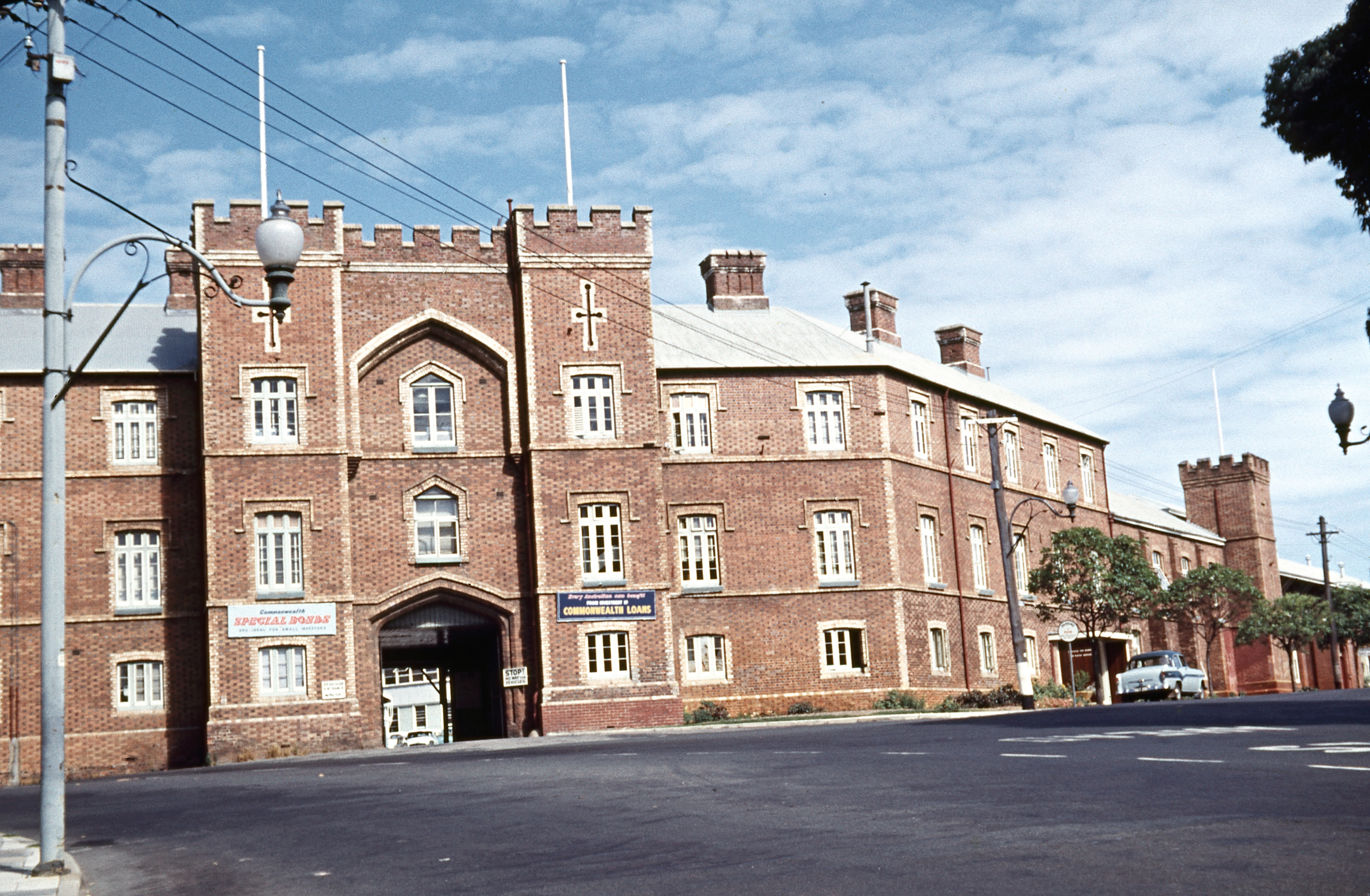
Pensioner Barracks prior to demolition of all but the arch

The Government intended to demolish the Barracks to facilitate the building of the Mitchell Freeway after the departments moved to their new location. The Royal Western Australian Historical Society formed a Barracks Defence Council in 1961, and joined the public outcry against demolition in 1966. The Barracks Defence Council worked to keep the arch and five bays of windows either side, and at worst, keep only the gateway and towers. Meanwhile, demolition proceeded, with the third and fourth bays of windows demolished and rubble cleared.

Opinion polls were conducted to gauge the public's preferences. A March 1966 poll by radio station 6IX received 2,747 votes to retain the arch and 59 votes for demolition. The West Australian newspaper's July poll recorded 9,681 votes for retention and 1,345 against. Cabinet authorised a Gallup poll, which showed 49% of votes for retention, 35% against, 11% no opinion, and 5% for moving the arch elsewhere. Premier David Brand interpreted the results as indecisive, and declared parliament would decide on the arch's fate on a non-party basis. The motion to demolish the arch was defeated on 19 October 1966, by 26 votes to 18.

The Barracks Arch blocks the otherwise unobstructed view from Parliament House down the length of St Georges Terrace and conversely of Parliament House from St Georges Terrace. The arch is within the precinct where parliament itself has planning jurisdiction in priority to the local government, the City of Perth, and it was intended that demolition of the arch would provide unobstructed views. That intention was a prime argument advanced in favour of the demolition.

The Public Works Department retained the arch and landscaped the surrounding area. Over time, conservation plans have worked to keep the structure managed and preserved. The conflict over the Barracks is a point where some organizations measure the start and their progress as effective political force in conservation battles.

== Appraisal ==
Writing of the arch in his 1999 memoir, Bagman to Swagman, British businessman and property developer Alistair McAlpine, criticised the earlier demolition of the barracks:

The gateway stands lonely, lost, irrelevant, a rebuke to the Western Australian parliamentarians who were responsible for an architectural tragedy. I do not refer to the loss of the fine buildings in St Georges Terrace – that loss was due only to the natural course of commerce, ignorance and the short-sighted pursuit of greed – but rather to the pulling down of the Barracks, an impediment to the view from Parliament House.
