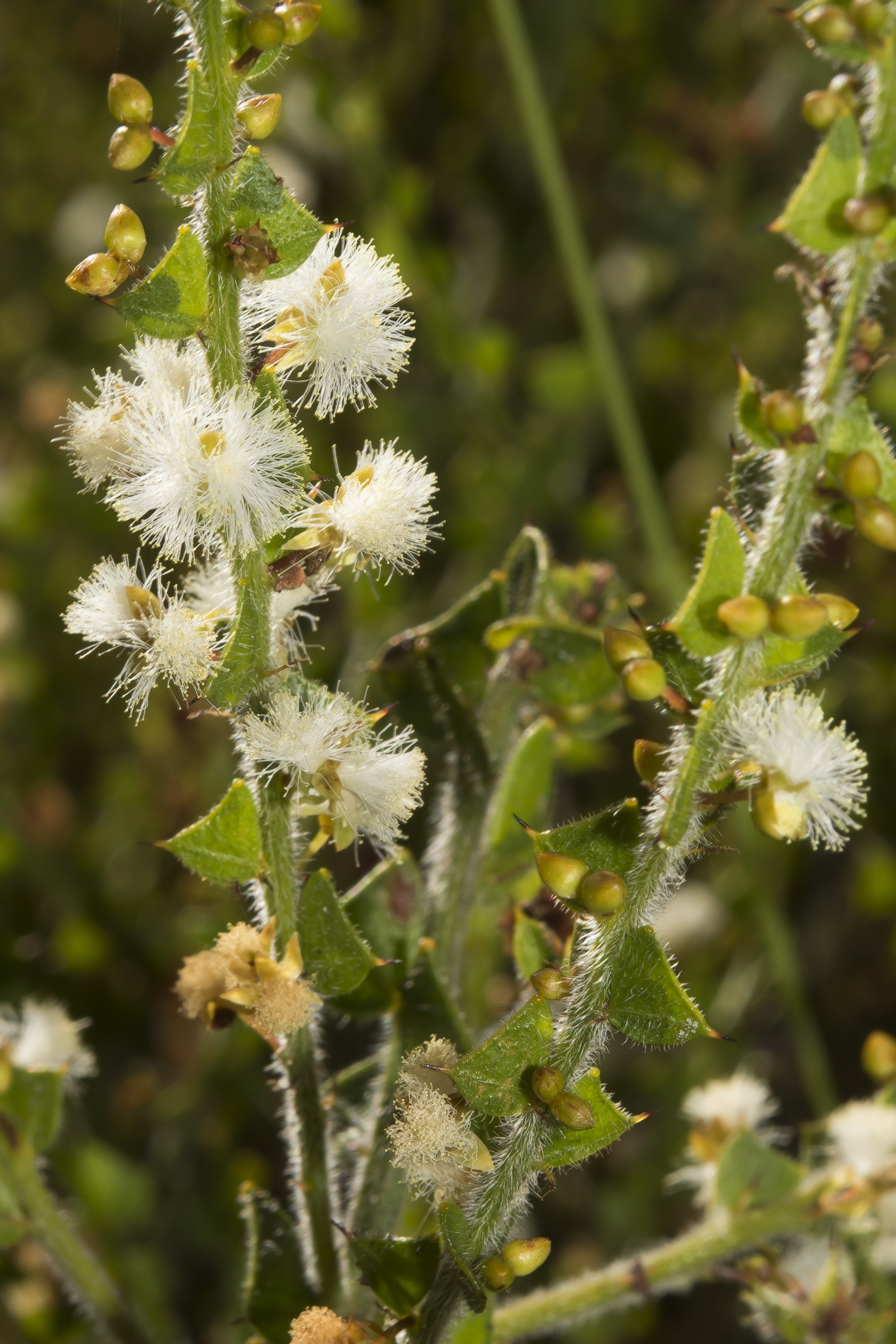
- Near Porongurup

Scientific classification
- Kingdom: Plantae
- Clade: Tracheophytes
- Clade: Angiosperms
- Clade: Eudicots
- Clade: Rosids
- Order: Fabales
- Family: Fabaceae
- Subfamily: Caesalpinioideae
- Clade: Mimosoid clade
- Genus: Acacia
- Species: A. biflora

Binomial name
- Acacia biflora R.Br.
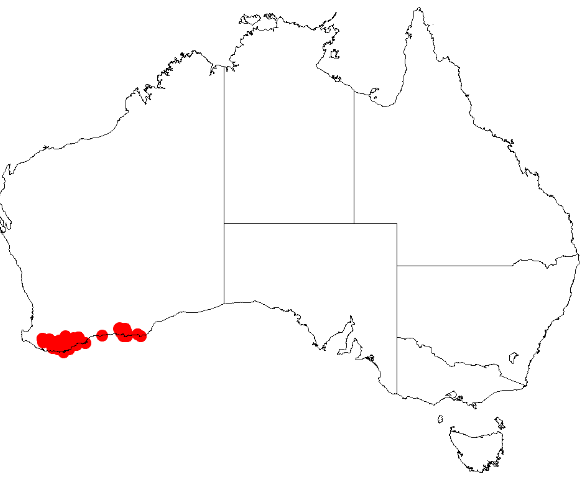
- Occurrence data from AVH

Synonyms
- Acacia biflora R.Br. var. biflora; Acacia triangularis Benth.; Mimosa biflora (R.Br.) Poir.; Racosperma biflorum (R.Br.) Pedley

= Acacia biflora =

Two flowered acacia

Species of shrub

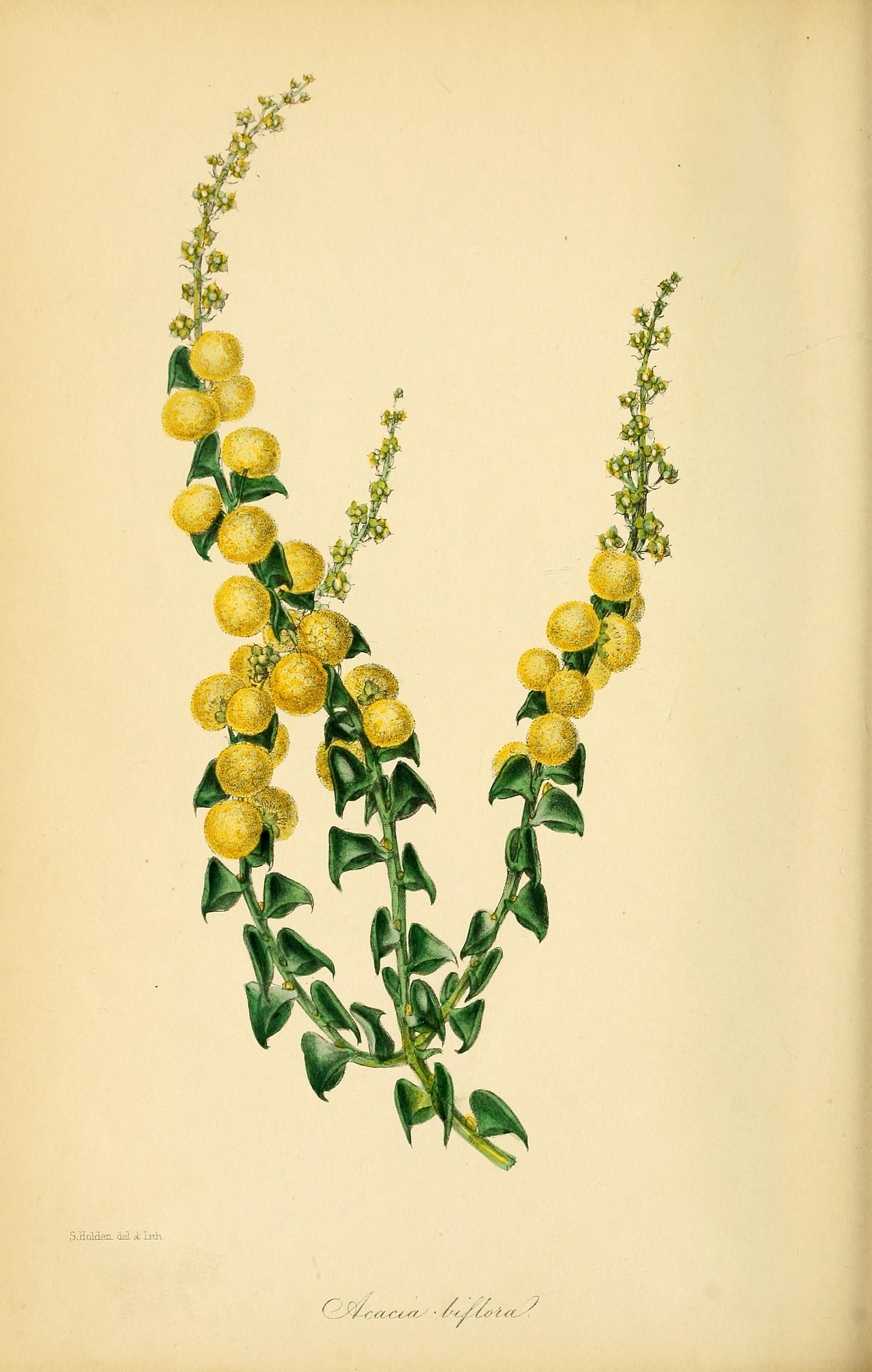
Illustration from Joseph Paxton's "Magazine of Botany".

Acacia biflora, commonly known as two-flowered acacia, is a species of flowering plant in the family Fabaceae and is endemic to the south-west of Western Australia. It is a prostrate, ascending or erect, open or dense shrub with triangular phyllodes with the narrower end towards the base and continuous with the branchlets, spherical heads of white or cream-coloured flowers, and curved, narrowly oblong pods.

== Description ==
Acacia biflora is a prostrate to ascending, erect, open or dense shrub that typically grows to a height of 10–60 cm (3.9–23.6 in). Its phyllodes are triangular with the narrower end towards the base and one edge more or less joined to the branchlet, 3–7 mm (0.12–0.28 in) long and 3–8 mm (0.12–0.31 in) wide and sharply-pointed. The leaves are sometimes longer on older branches. The flowers are in a single spherical head in axils on a peduncle 3–8 mm (0.12–0.31 in) long, each head with only two white to cream-coloured flowers. Flowering has been observed between October and May, and the pods are leathery to crust-like, narrowly oblong and curved, up to 55 mm (2.2 in) long and 4–5 mm (0.16–0.20 in) wide containing glossy, greyish brown, oblong seeds 3.0–3.5 mm (0.12–0.14 in) long with an aril on the end.

== Taxonomy ==
Acacia biflora was first formally described in 1813 by the botanist Robert Brown in William Townsend Aiton Hortus Kewensis. The species is sometimes confused with A. chrysocephala A. robiniae A. chrysocephala.

A. biflora is part of the A. biflora group of Acacias along with A. chrysocephala, A. divergens, A. incrassata, A. mooreana, A. phlebopetala and A. robiniae. The species all have similar structure but can be differentiated by flower characteristics.

The specific epithet (biflora) is derived from the Latin prefix bi- meaning "two" and the Latin word flos meaning "flower".

== Distribution and habitat ==
Two-flowered acacia is native to the Avon Wheatbelt, Esperance Plains, Jarrah Forest, Mallee bioregions of south-western Western Australia where it grows in sandy to gravelly lateritic soils. The shrub is found in a large continuous distribution from the Stirling Range National Park south to the coast and then east to near Jerramungup and Bremer Bay with disjunct populations in several areas further east including around Scaddan and at Lucky Bay in Cape Le Grand National Park. It is often found as part of woodlands or low mallee scrubland communities.

== See also ==
- List of Acacia species
