= Karrakatta Club =

Female-only women's club in Perth, Western Australia

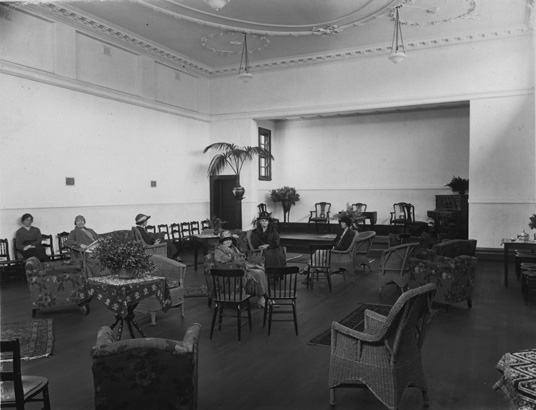
- Karrakatta Club reading rooms in the 1920s
- Predecessor: St George Reading Circle
- Formation: October 1894
- Type: Female-only women's club
- Headquarters: 28 St Georges Terrace, Perth, Western Australia
- Coordinates: 31°57′24″S 115°51′46″E
- Website: www.karrakattaclub.com.au

The Karrakatta Club is a female-only women's club in Perth, Western Australia. Established in 1894, it was the first women's club in Australia.

== History ==
The Karrakatta Club was founded in 1894 by members of Amy Jane Best's St George Reading Circle. The St George Reading Circle was formed around 1887 for the purpose of exchanging and discussing reading material, and debating current affairs. Following a visit from an American, Dr Emily Ryder, the Circle decided to form a new club modelled on the Education Clubs that were popular in America. Amy Jane Best constructed the constitution. The objective of the club was to bring into one body the women of the community for mutual improvement which included involvement in local issues affecting women at that time, social justice issues, and social engagement. The club's motto, suggested by Edith Cowan, is Spectemur Agendo, which means "let us be judged by our actions". The club's first President was Madeline Onslow, wife of Alexander Onslow.

In 1904, ten years after the founding of the Karrakatta Club, the first Lyceum Club was founded in London by Constance Smedley. The aim of the Lyceum Clubs was similar to those of the Karrakatta Club. In 1923 it was decided by the members of the Karrakatta Club to align the Club with the international movement of Lyceum Clubs. This opened the Karrakatta Club to a wider contact with women all over the world.

In 1954 it had its diamond jubilee.

In 1972/73 the Australian Association of Lyceum Clubs was formed to link all Lyceum Clubs in Australia under the one banner, and to be part of the International Association of Lyceum Clubs linking all Lyceum Clubs worldwide.

In late 1984 the Karrakatta Club moved into the Lawson Apartments building at the corner of Sherwood Court and The Esplanade. In October 2020 the club moved to new premises at the Anzac house building on St Georges Terrace.

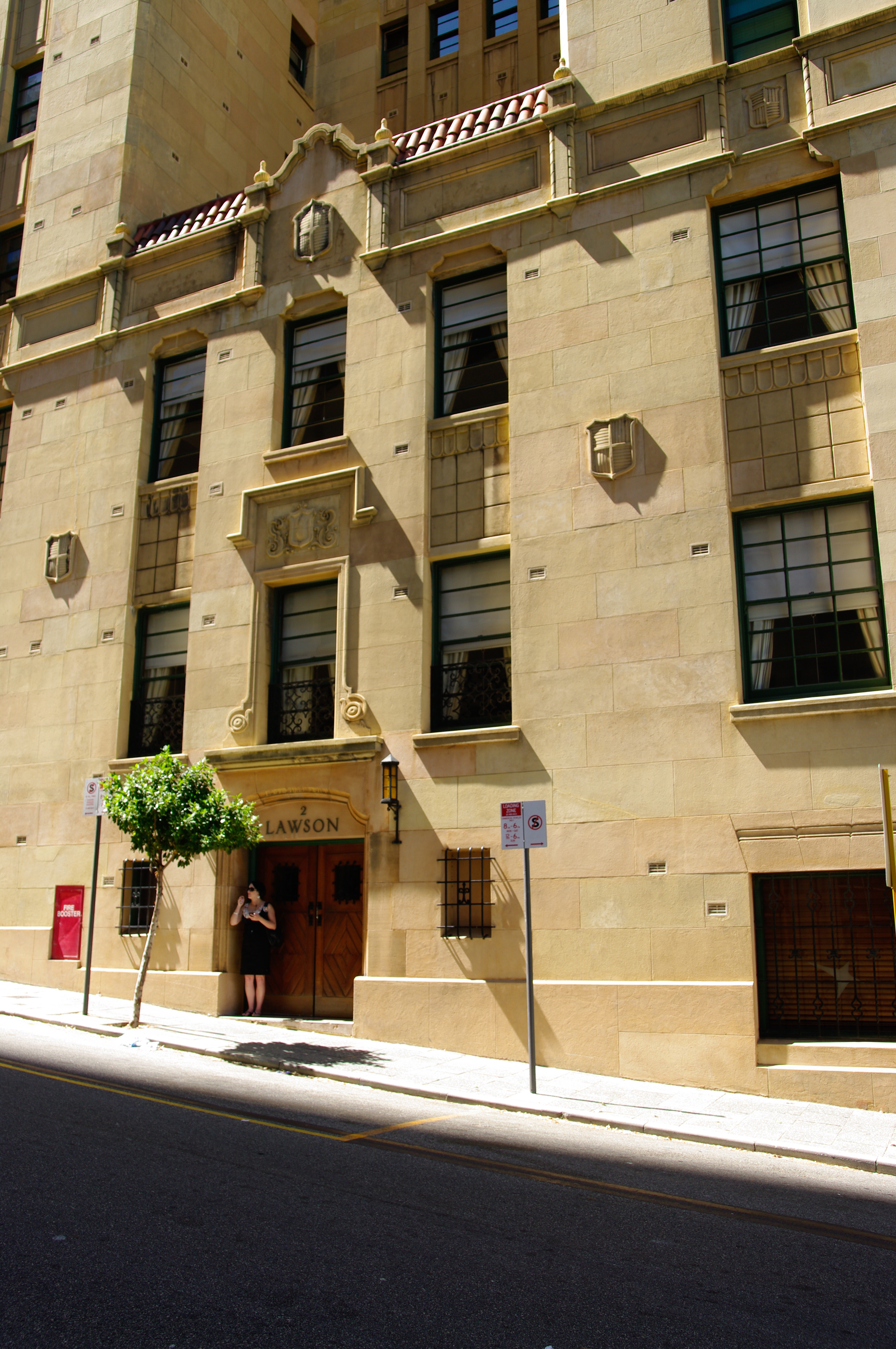
The former entrance to the Karrakatta Club on Sherwood Court

== Notable members ==
- Amy Jane Best from Tasmania created the Central School for Girls in Perth.
- Katherine Broadhurst, daughter of Eliza and Charles Edward Broadhurst, was a suffragette in England and member of the St George Reading Circle.
- Emma Onslow, wife of Alexander Onslow, the third Chief Justice of the Supreme Court of Western Australia. Lady Onslow was the first president of the Karrakatta Club, between 1894 and 1901.
- Edith Cowan, was an Australian politician, social campaigner and the first woman elected to an Australian parliament. Cowan was the first secretary of the Karrakatta Club in 1894, subsequently becoming the Club's president between 1910 and 1912.
- Margaret Forrest, wife of John Forrest the first Premier of Western Australia and a cabinet minister in Australia's first federal parliament. Lady Forrest was a founding member of the Karrakatta Club.
- Roberta Jull, the first woman to establish a medical practice in Western Australia and a founding member of the Western Australian Branch of British Medical Association.
- Marion Holmes, daughter of Henry Holmes, the General Manager of the Bank of Western Australia. She was a key figure in the Ministering Children's League and the Western Australian Branch of The Girls' Friendly Society. Holmes was a founding member of the Karrakatta Club.
- Gertrude Ella Mead, the third woman doctor registered in Western Australia and an inaugural member of the Senate of the University of Western Australia. She was the daughter of Silas Mead. Mead was the vice-president of the Karrakatta Club between 1912 and 1914.

== General references ==
- "KarraKatta Club (1894–)". Australian Women. National Foundation for Australian Women.
- Cowan, Peter (1978). A unique position: a biography of Edith Dircksey Cowan 1861–1932. Nedlands, Western Australia: University of Western Australia Press. ISBN 0-85564-135-5.
