= Ursula Frayne =

Irish nun (1816–1885)

Mother Superior Ursula Frayne
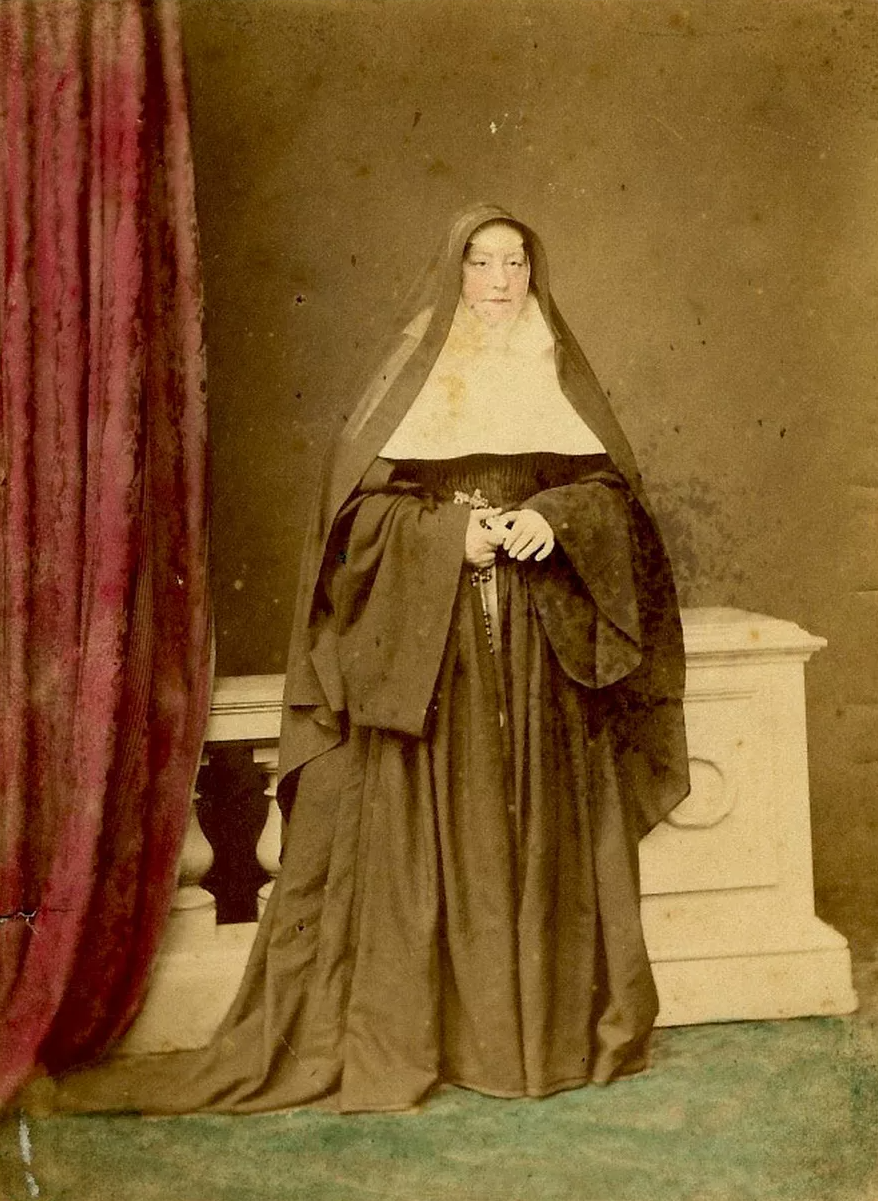
- Frayne in 1857

Personal life
- Born: 5 October 1816 Dublin, Ireland
- Died: 9 June 1885 (aged 68) Fitzroy, Australia

Religious life
- Religion: Catholic Church
- Order: Sisters of Mercy
- Monastic name: Ursula Frayne

Ursula Frayne (born Clara Frayne; 5 October 1816 – 9 June 1885) was an Irish nun who became a Mother Superior of the Sisters of Mercy and spent her life in missionary work, initially in Canada but largely in Australia developing schools and academies.

== Early life ==
Clara Frayne was born to the wealthy businessman Robert Frayne, and his wife, Bridget, in Dublin, Ireland. She entered Baggot Street with Catherine McCauley the then-recently-formed Institute of Mercy in Dublin in 1834 and took Ursula in place of her baptismal name. She was appointed Mother Superior in 1842, taking charge of the Institute's first foreign mission foundation in Newfoundland.

== Arriving in Australia ==
In 1845, she left for Perth, Western Australia in response to a request for religious sisters to staff a newly constructed school commissioned by the recently consecrated Bishop John Brady. Frayne arrived with some companions on 8 January 1846. Concerned for the conditions under which the sisters were working, the Dublin mother-house sent money for return fares. But Mother Ursula refused to abandon the mission. She realised that the sisters would have to generate their own income.

In 1846 Ursula opened the first Mercy school and the first secondary school in Western Australia. It was a 'select' fee-paying school for the education of an almost exclusively non-Catholic clientele. It generated much needed funds and brought the mission financial stability.

Using this model Frayne commissioned other schools by establishing almost simultaneously a 'select' fee-paying school together with an infants school and a primary school, usually on the same site and often within the same building. In 1865, despite the impending withdrawal of government aid the Sisters of Mercy schools in Western Australia were thriving.

== Final years in Melbourne ==
After enduring a dispute with Bishop John Brady, Frayne responded to a request from the Irish-born Bishop James Alipius Goold for a Victorian foundation in Melbourne. Bishop Francis Murphy of Adelaide also put a similar request to her but Frayne had already committed to Bishop Goold.

Six weeks after her arrival in Melbourne, Frayne had raised loans to pay off the mortgages on her convent in Nicholson Street, Fitzroy. Speedy development followed and considerable construction of buildings for social and educational work was undertaken, peaking in the erection of the first wing of the present 'Academy' for £6000 in 1870. The Sisters of Mercy were the first teaching nuns in Victoria. She also founded the St Vincent de Paul's Orphanage in South Melbourne. Frayne's first Victorian foundation was in Kilmore, Victoria in 1875.

== Death ==
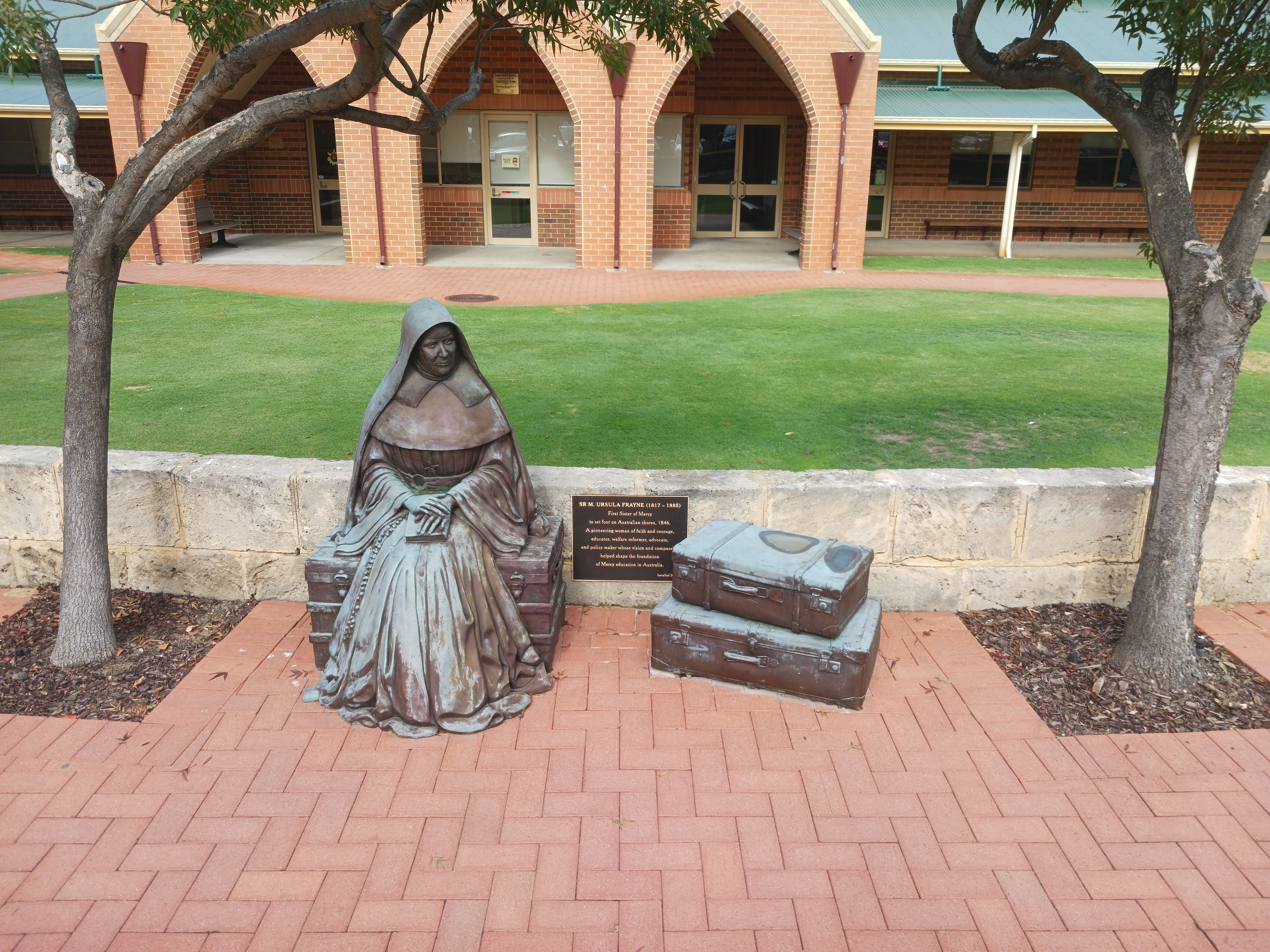
Statue of Ursula Frayne at the Mercedes College, Perth

Mother Ursula died in Nicholson Street, Fitzroy, on 9 June 1885, aged 68. A Gothic chapel to her memory was built by her successor in the convent grounds. Her remains are buried in a vault in the chapel under a Celtic cross, reminding all of her origins. She is commemorated in the name of the Ursula Frayne Catholic College, Perth, Western Australia- and also in the dementia ward of Mercy Place, Albury; renamed in 2014 to commemorate "Ursula Frayne".

In 2023, The West Australian newspaper identified the one-hundred people who had shaped the state of Western Australia and they included the botanist Georgiana Molloy, settler Emma Withnell, suffragist Bessie Rischbieth, politician Edith Cowan, Sister Margaret O'Brien, Dr Roberta Jull, Amy Jane Best and Frayne.

== Further links ==
St Vincent de Paul's Orphanage, Melbourne. 1855-1967
