= Museum of Perth =

Museum in Perth, Western Australia

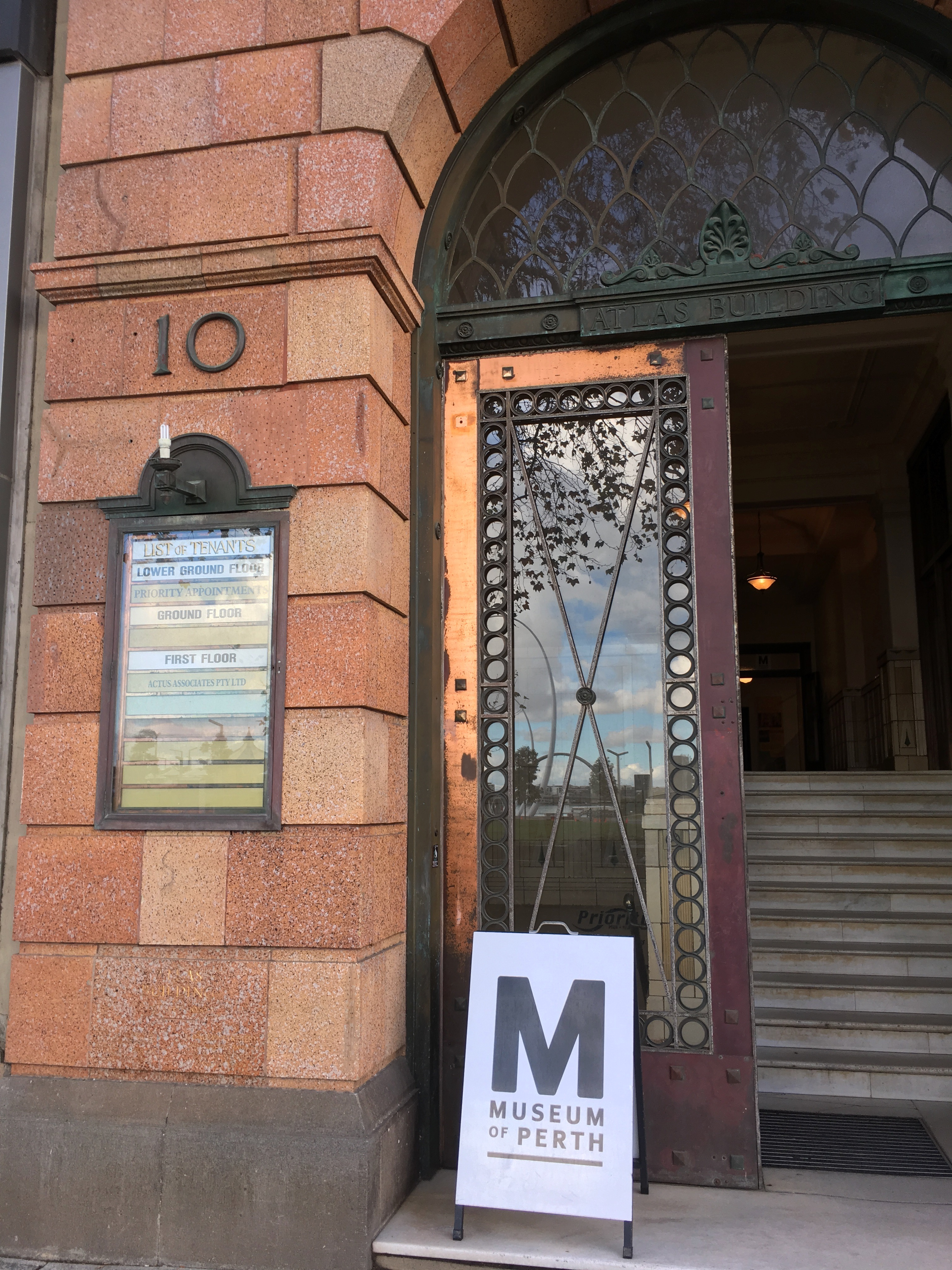
- Former entrance into Atlas Building at the Esplanade in 2018, before the museum moved
- Location: 410 Murray Street, Perth, Western Australia
- Coordinates: 31°57′15″S 115°51′39″E
- Website: www.museumofperth.com.au

The Museum of Perth is a private, non-profit museum involved with chronicling the social, cultural, political and architectural history of Perth. The museum is currently, as of 2024, located in a former telephone exchange building on Murray Street, in Perth, Western Australia.

In 2016 the museum was housed in the Atlas Building, on the Esplanade. In 2024 it moved to the Bon Marché Arcade building, in Barrack Street.

== Beginnings ==
It began life in October 2012 as a virtual museum on the social media site Twitter, created by Dallas Robertson, a museum studies student at Edith Cowan University. It was expanded into Facebook the following year.

Following an online article about the Twitter page from the Australian Broadcasting Corporation (Perth) in 2013, City of Perth councillor Reece Harley approached Robertson about opening a brick and mortar version of the museum.

In 2014 the still-virtual museum gained local attention when it led a campaign against the City of Perth to save an art deco factory from demolition, but which ultimately failed when a Western Australian state minister intervened to support the local government's decision.

== Formation ==
By July 2015 the Perth History Association was established comprising members Dallas Robertson, Reece Harley, Ryan Zaknich, Ryan Mossny, Richard Offen and Diana Warnock. The not-for-profit organisation subsequently founded the Museum of Perth with Reece Harley as executive director. In October 2015 the Museum of Perth became a reality, with project manager Alysha Worth employed to oversee its establishment. The museum originally operated out of a shared space with cafe Henry Saw on Grand Lane, Perth.

== Exhibits ==
Along with a permanent exhibition on the history of Perth, the museum also has a micro-cinema and hosts rotating exhibitions on Perth's social history.

The Museum of Perth has also had collaborations with the Town of East Fremantle (called Streets of East Freo), University of Notre Dame Australia (called Streets of Freo), and the City of Bunbury (called Streets of Bunbury) to produce websites about each of those places.

== Events ==
The museum also had been involved in the annual Heritage Perth Perth Heritage Days.

== Publications ==
- Shaping Perth
- Soldiers of Barrack Street
- Demolished Icons of Perth
- Perth Apartments: The Krantz Legacy
