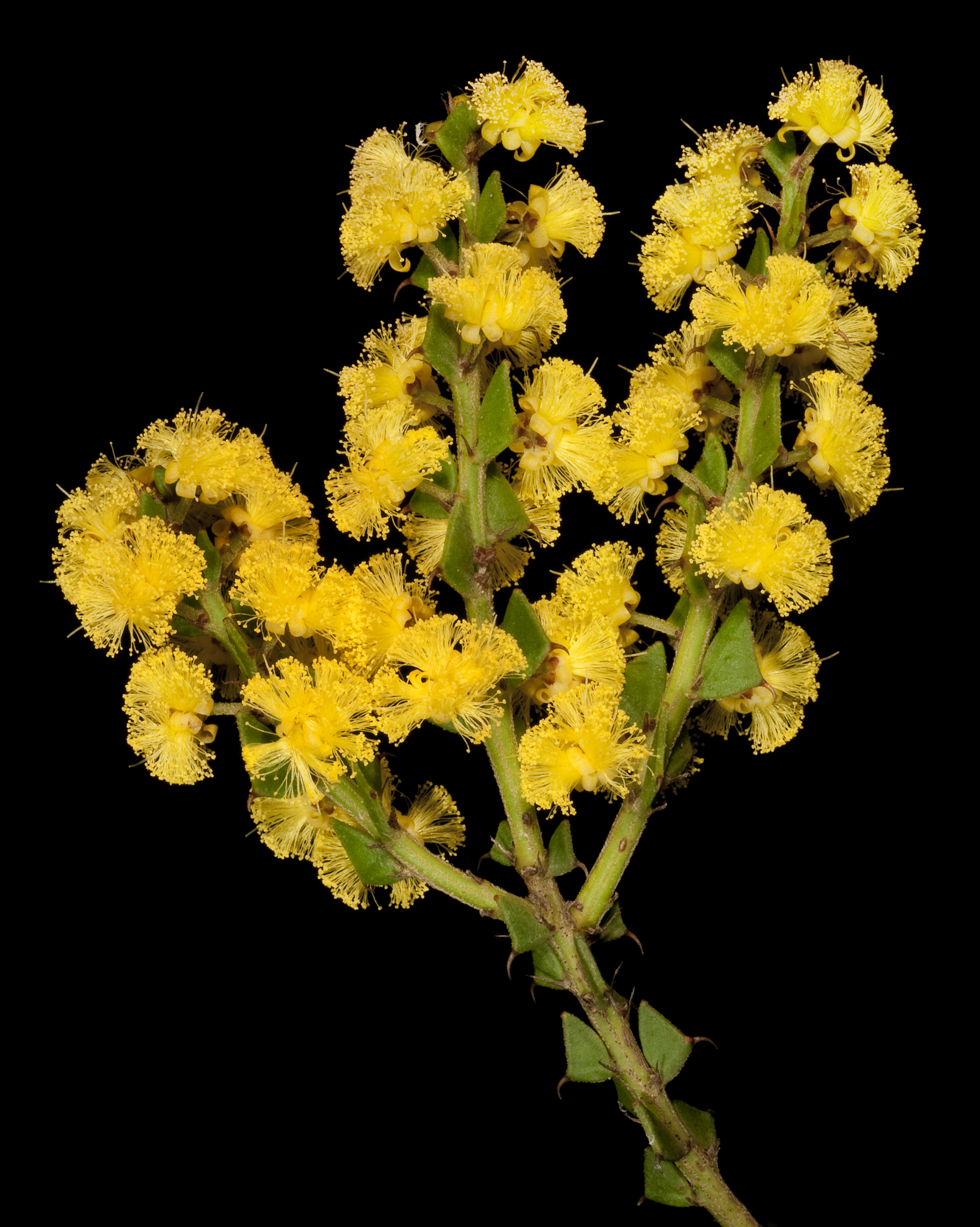

Scientific classification
- Kingdom: Plantae
- Clade: Tracheophytes
- Clade: Angiosperms
- Clade: Eudicots
- Clade: Rosids
- Order: Fabales
- Family: Fabaceae
- Subfamily: Caesalpinioideae
- Clade: Mimosoid clade
- Genus: Acacia
- Species: A. chrysocephala

Binomial name
- Acacia chrysocephala Maslin
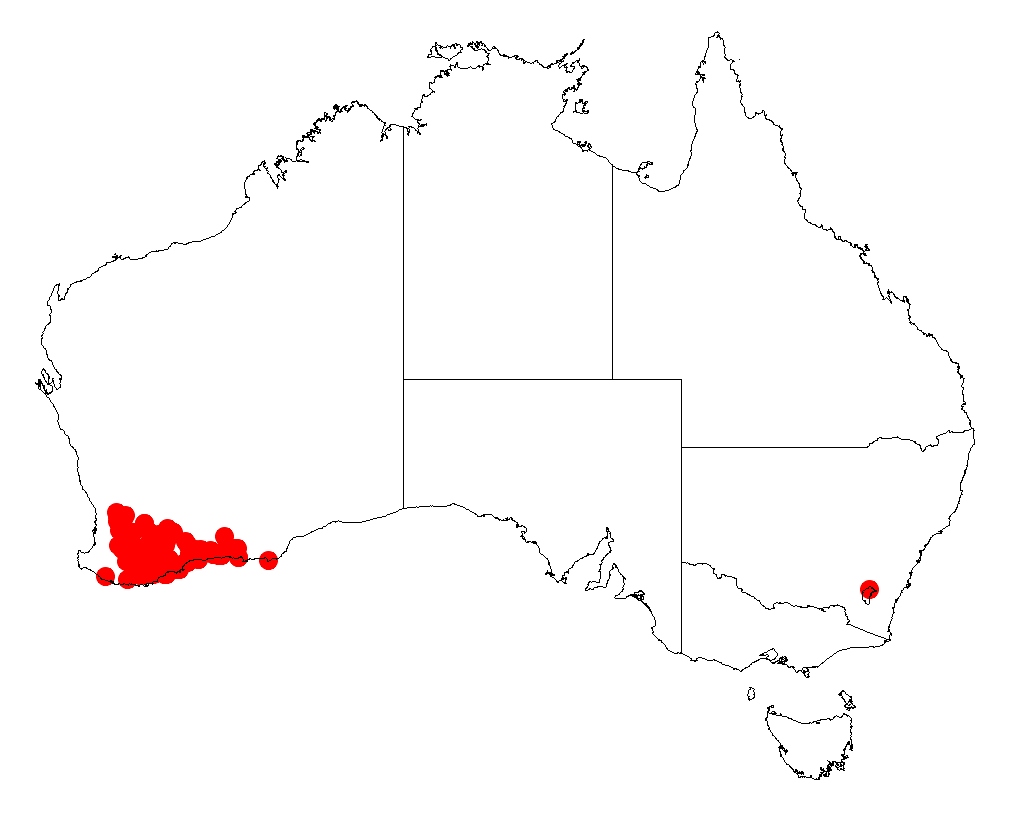
- Occurrence data from AVH

Synonyms
- Acacia biflora var. aurea E.Pritz.; Racosperma chrysocephalum (Maslin) Pedley; Acacia biflora auct. non R.Br.: Bentham, G. (5 October 1864) p.p.; Acacia triangularis auct. non Benth.: Meisner, C.D.F. in Lehmann, J.G.C.

= Acacia chrysocephala =

Species of legume

Acacia chrysocephala is a species of flowering plant in the family Fabaceae and is endemic to the south-west of Western Australia. It is a dense, much branched, compact, spiny shrub or subshrub, with hairy, ribbed branchlets, triangular, sharply pointed phyllodes, spherical heads of golden yellow flowers and curved, leathery to crust-like pods.

== Description ==
Acacia chrysocephala is a dense, compact and spiny shrub or subshrub, with many branches and that typically grows to a height of 30–50 cm (12–20 in) and has ribbed, hairy branchlets. Its phyllodes are triangular with one edge fused to the branchlet, 3–12 mm (0.12–0.47 in) long, 1.5–10 mm (0.059–0.394 in) wide and usually sharply pointed. The flowers are borne in a spherical head in axils on a peduncle 0.5–3 mm (0.020–0.118 in) long, each head with 2 to 4 golden yellow flowers. Flowering occurs from May to October and the pods are shallowly curved, up to 30 mm (1.2 in) long, 2–3 mm (0.079–0.118 in) wide and leathery to crust-like, containing more or less oblong, shiny brown or greyish brown seeds 2.5–3 mm (0.098–0.118 in) long.

Acacia chrysocephala is a member of the Acacia biflora group and is related to Acacia incrassata.

== Taxonomy ==
In 1904, Ernst Pritzel described Acacia biflora var. aurea in the journal Botanische Jahrbücher für Systematik, Pflanzengeschichte und Pflanzengeographie from specimens he collected near Cranbrook. In 1978, Bruce Maslin raised the variety to species status as A. chrysocephala in the journal Nuytsia. The specific epithet (chrysocephala) means 'golden-headed'.

== Distribution and habitat ==
This species of wattle is found in scattered populations from York to the Stirling Range and east as far as Scaddan and Bremer Bay where it grows in sandy or clay soils over laterite in the Avon Wheatbelt, Esperance Plains, Jarrah Forest and Mallee bioregions of south-western Western Australia. It is found in Eucalyptus wandoo woodlands, Eucalyptus marginata forests, in mallee scrub and sometimes in low heath communities.

== Conservation status ==
Acacia chrysocephala is listed as "not threatened" by the Government of Western Australia Department of Biodiversity, Conservation and Attractions.

== See also ==
- List of Acacia species
