= Pultenaea brachytropis =

Scientific classification
- Kingdom: Plantae
- Clade: Tracheophytes
- Clade: Angiosperms
- Clade: Eudicots
- Clade: Rosids
- Order: Fabales
- Family: Fabaceae
- Subfamily: Faboideae
- Genus: Pultenaea
- Species: P. brachytropis

Binomial name
- Pultenaea brachytropis Benth.

Species of flowering plant

Pultenaea brachytropis is a species of flowering plant in the family Fabaceae and is endemic to the south-west of Western Australia. It is an erect, spindly shrub with more or less cylindrical, grooved leaves and yellow, red and orange flowers.

== Description ==
Pultenaea brachytropis is an erect, spindly shrub that typically grows to a height of up to 1.5 m (4 ft 11 in) with hairy stems. The leaves are cylindrical but with one or two grooves along the lower surface, 7.5–23 mm (0.30–0.91 in) long and 1.5–4 mm (0.059–0.157 in) wide and hairy with stipules at the base. The flowers are yellow, red and orange with multicoloured marks. The flowers are sessile or borne on a pedicel up to 1.0 mm (0.039 in) long with hairy bracteoles 3.8–4 mm (0.15–0.16 in) long. The sepals are about 6.5 mm (0.26 in) long and hairy. The standard petal is 9.5–10 mm (0.37–0.39 in) long, the wings 8.0–8.5 mm (0.31–0.33 in) long and the keel 5.5–6 mm (0.22–0.24 in) long. Flowering occurs from September to November and the fruit is an oval pod.

== Taxonomy and naming ==
Pultenaea brachytropis was first formally described in 1841 in the Edwards's Botanical Register from a manuscript by George Bentham. The type specimens are from plants grown by James Mangles from seeds collected by Georgiana Molloy. The specific epithet (brachytropis) means "short-keeled", referring to the keel being much shorter than the wings.

== Distribution and habitat ==
This pultenaea grows on slopes, ridges and along creeks in the Jarrah Forest, Swan Coastal Plain and Warren biogeographic regions in the south-west of Western Australia.

== Conservation status ==
Pultenaea brachytropis is classified as "not threatened" by the Western Australian Government Department of Parks and Wildlife.
