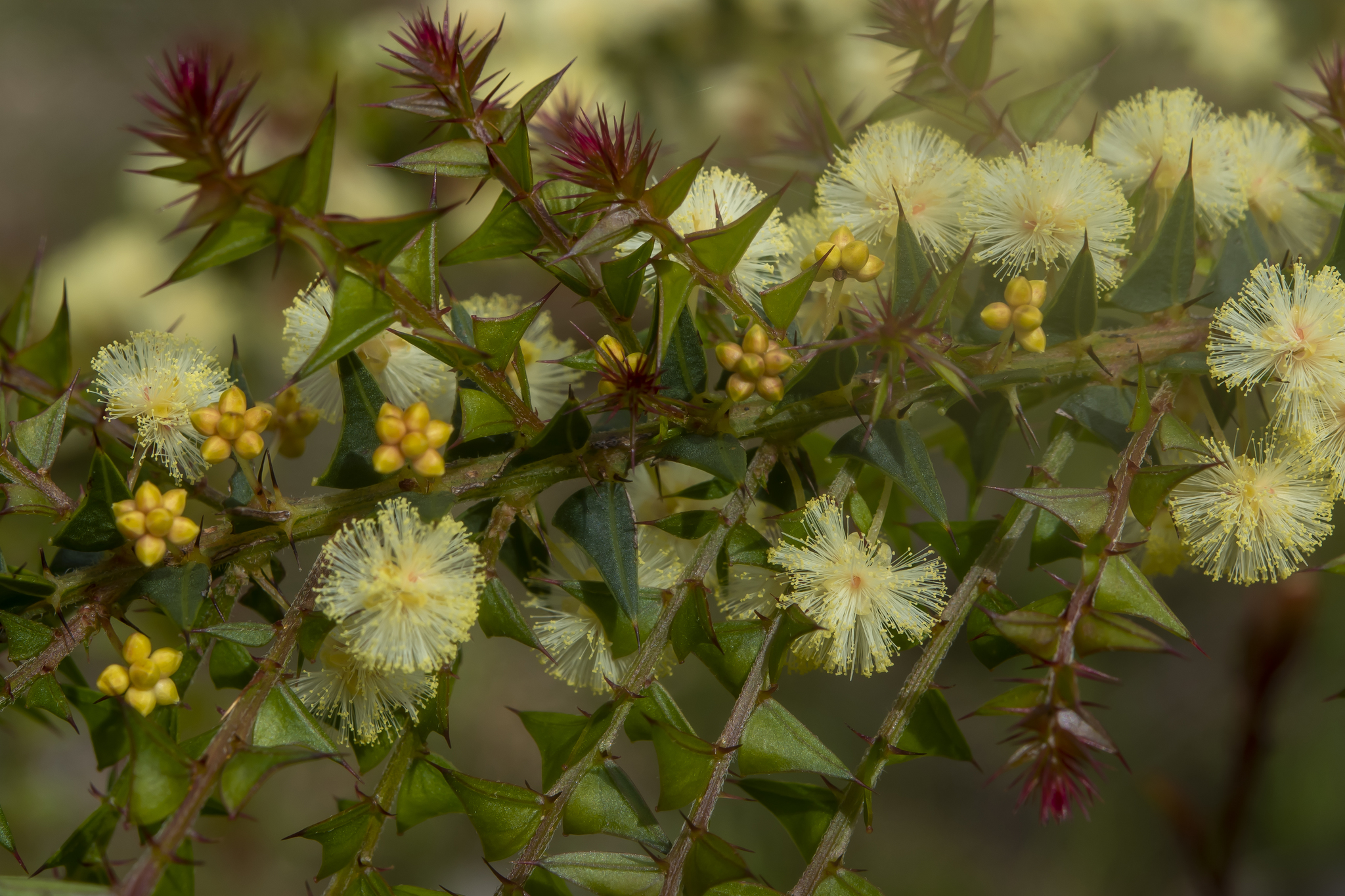
- Near Pemberton

Scientific classification
- Kingdom: Plantae
- Clade: Tracheophytes
- Clade: Angiosperms
- Clade: Eudicots
- Clade: Rosids
- Order: Fabales
- Family: Fabaceae
- Subfamily: Caesalpinioideae
- Clade: Mimosoid clade
- Genus: Acacia
- Species: A. divergens

Binomial name
- Acacia divergens Benth.
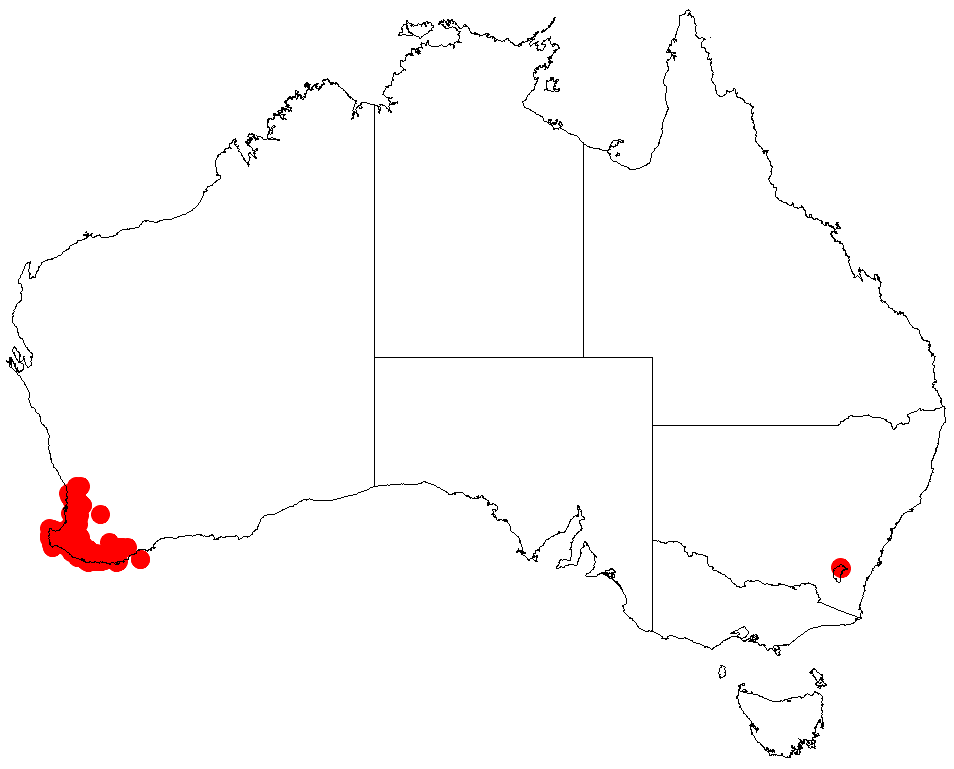
- Occurrence data from AVH

Synonyms
- Acacia divergens Benth. f. divergens; Acacia divergens f. pauciflora Domin nom. inval., nom. nud.; Acacia divergens Benth. var. divergens; Acacia divergens var. hirsuta Domin; Racosperma divergens (Benth.) Pedley

= Acacia divergens =

Species of legume

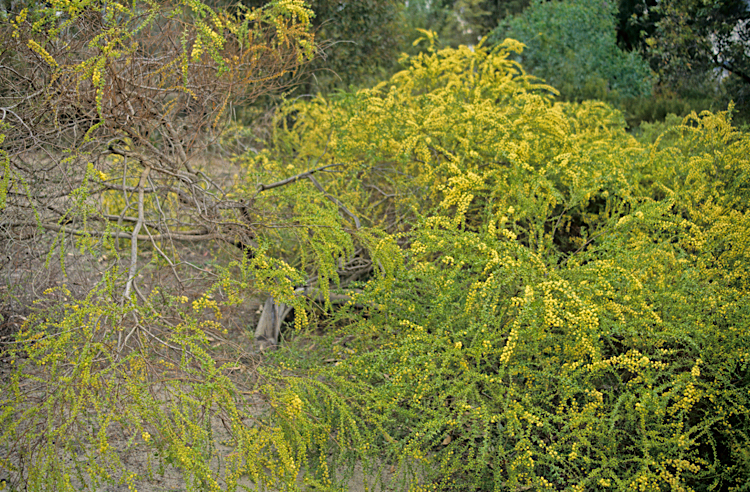
Habit in Kings Park, Perth

Acacia divergens is a species of flowering plant in the family Fabaceae and is endemic to the south-west of Western Australia. It is diffuse, open and spreading, spiny shrub with long, arching branches, Δ-shaped to triangular, sharply pointed phyllodes with the narrower end towards the base, spherical heads of cream-coloured to pale yellow flowers and linear, curved or twisted pods.

== Description ==
Acacia divergens is a diffuse, open and spreading shrub that typically grows to a height of 0.4–2.5 m (1 ft 4 in – 8 ft 2 in) and has its end branches long, undivided and arching downwards. Its branchlets are finely yellow-ribbed and glabrous or with short, soft hairs. The phyllodes are Δ-shaped to triangular with the narrower end towards the base, with a prominent gland-bearing angle on the upper edge, 6–10 mm (0.24–0.39 in) long, 3–8 mm (0.12–0.31 in) wide and sharply pointed with a prominent midrib near the lower edge. There are often spiny, slender stipules 2–4 mm (0.079–0.157 in) long at the base of the phyllodes. The flowers are borne in a single spherical head in axils on a slender peduncle 3.5–10 mm (0.14–0.39 in) long, the heads with five to ten cream-coloured to pale yellow flowers. Flowering mostly occurs from August to November, and the pods are linear, curved and often twisted, up to 70 mm (2.8 in) long, 2–3 mm (0.079–0.118 in) wide and thinly leathery to crust and glabrous. The seeds are more or less oblong, 2.5–30 mm (0.098–1.181 in) long and glossy brown with an aril.

A. divergens is part of the A. biflora group with phyllodes closely resembling those of A. robiniae.

== Taxonomy ==
Acacia divergens was first formally described in 1842 by George Bentham in Hooker's London Journal of Botany from specimens collected near the Vasse River by Georgiana Molloy. The specific epithet (divergens) means 'diverging' or 'different from', referring to the angle on the upper margin of the phyllode.

== Distribution and habitat ==
This species of wattle often grows near swamps and creeks, but also is jarrah forest and near Augusta in sand over limestone in coastal heath. It occurs in a discontinuous distribution from the Moora-Wongan Hills area to Augusta and Denmark areas and east to the Stirling Range in the Avon Wheatbelt, Esperance Plains, Jarrah Forest, Swan Coastal Plain and Warren bioregions of south-western Western Australia.

== Conservation status ==
Acacia divergensis listed as "not threatened" by the Government of Western Australia Department of Biodiversity, Conservation and Attractions.

== See also ==
- List of Acacia species
