= Amy Jane Best =

Australian schoolmistress

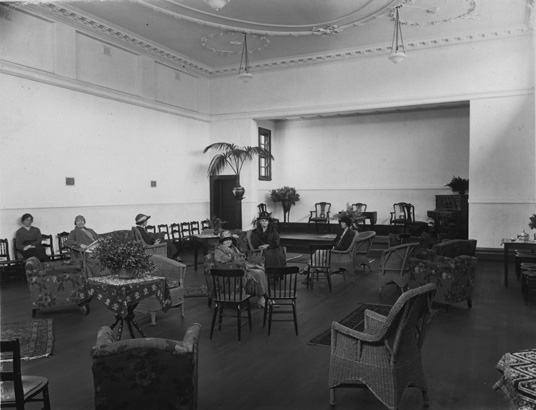
- The Karrakatta Club's reading rooms in the 1920s
- Born: 1844; Hobart, Van Diemen's Land
- Died: 28 May 1932 (aged 87–88); Perth
- Occupation: headmistress
- Known for: creating Perth's Central High School for Girls and the Karrakatta Club

Amy Jane Best (1844 – 28 May 1932) was an Australian schoolmistress. She founded and led "Miss Best's" - the Central High School for Girls in Perth. She was involved in the opening of the Karrakatta Club in Perth.

== Life ==
Best was born in 1844 in Hobart in Tasmania. Her parents were Jane (born Whyte) and her husband Henry Best, who had married the year before. Her mother's father, Thomas Whyte, had been a mariner who was pardoned after being transported to Australia. Her father was a newspaper printer who was in business with his brother Charles Best. Her siblings included Henry Best who was a bank manager, Douglas Best who worked for the Bank of Australasia and Francis Best who was a lawyer.

She was a teacher in Tasmania, but she moved to Perth in 1884. She was employed to run the Girls' College as its headmistress. The Girls' College was a boarding school that the short-lived idea of the Bishop of Perth, Henry Parry. His school closed in 1888 because of money problems, leaving a hole in the educational provision. Parry was at the time successfully organising the construction of Perth's cathedral, but which was also facing financial issues.

Best had created the St George Reading Circle in 1887 where women members could discuss current affairs and exchange ideas about books and literature. Following a visit from an American, Emily Ryder, the Circle decided to form the Karrakatta Club modelled on American Education Clubs. Best and J.A. Nisbet called the founding meeting and Best constructed the constitution.

Best's Central High School for Girls was known as "Miss Best's" and it had no similar competition. She employed six staff of whom two were part-time and they provided education for girls until they were eighteen. She believed in equal pay, votes for women, the truth and in justice. Best though that the most important subjects were English literature, history and languages, and of this literature was the most important.

The school closed in 1907 as other schools opened to deal with the influx of people attracted by the gold-rush. She had a long retirement as Best died in Perth in 1932. Two years after she died a group of ex-students organised an Amy Jane Best prize to be given each year to the best second year English literature female student at the University of Western Australia. In 2023 The West Australian newspaper identified the 100 people who had shaped the state of Western Australia and they included the botanist Georgiana Molloy, the educationalist Ursula Frayne, settler Emma Withnell, suffragist Bessie Rischbieth, politician Edith Cowan, Sister Margaret O'Brien, Dr Roberta Jull and Amy Jane Best noting that she had started the school and the Karrakatta Club.
