= Acacia robiniae =

Robin's wattle

Scientific classification
- Kingdom: Plantae
- Clade: Tracheophytes
- Clade: Angiosperms
- Clade: Eudicots
- Clade: Rosids
- Order: Fabales
- Family: Fabaceae
- Subfamily: Caesalpinioideae
- Clade: Mimosoid clade
- Genus: Acacia
- Species: A. robiniae

Binomial name
- Acacia robiniae Maslin
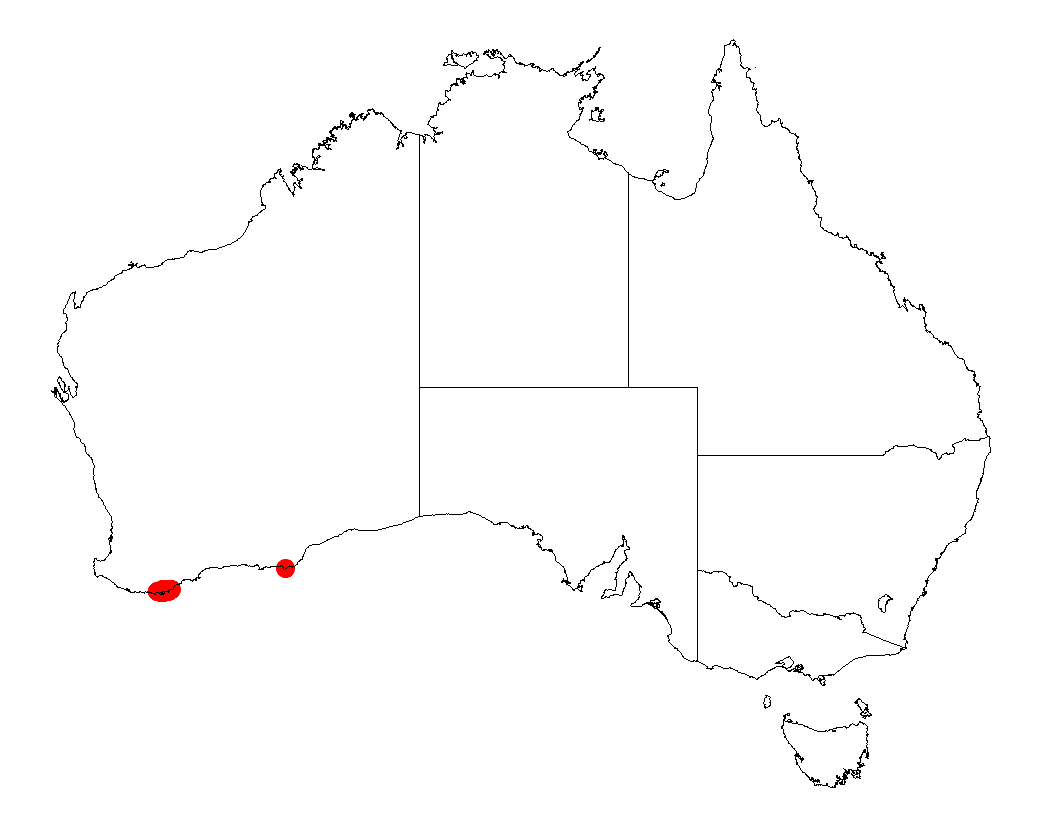
- Occurrence data from AVH

Species of legume

Habit in King River

Acacia robiniae, commonly known as Robin's wattle, is a shrub of the genus Acacia and the subgenus Phyllodineae that is endemic to south western Australia.

== Description ==
The pungent shrub typically grows to a height of 0.3 to 0.7 metres (1 to 2 ft) and has an open and spreading habit with sparely pilose and hairy branchlet with pungent stipules that are 1.5 to 2.5 mm (0.059 to 0.098 in) in length. Like most species of Acacia it has phyllodes rather than true leaves. The pungent, glabrous and evergreen phyllodes have an obtriangular to obdeltate to shallowly obtriangular shape that are contiguous with the branchlet. The phyllodes have a length of 3 to 8 mm (0.12 to 0.31 in) and a width of 3 to 8 mm (0.12 to 0.31 in) and have a midrib near the abaxial margin. It blooms from April to September and produces white-cream flowers. The simple inflorescences occur singly in the axils and have spherical flower-heads containing two white to off-white coloured flowers. Following flowering coriaceous to crustaceous d+seed pods form that have a narrowly oblong shape and are shallowly curved. The glabrous pods have a length up to 6 cm (2.4 in) and a width of 3 to 4 mm (0.12 to 0.16 in) and have thick margins. The glossy dark brown coloured seeds inside have an oblong shape and a length of 2.5 to 3 mm (0.098 to 0.118 in) with a terminal aril.

== Taxonomy ==
The species was first formally described by the botanist Bruce Maslin as part of the work Studies in the genus Acacia - A revision of the Uninerves - Triangulares, in part (the tetramerous species) as published in the journal Nuytsia. It was reclassified as Racosperma robiniae by Leslie Pedley in 2003 then transferred back to genus Acacia in 2006. It belongs to the Acacia biflora group and most closely resembles Acacia divergens.

== Distribution ==
It has a discontinuous distribution and is native to an area in the Great Southern and Goldfields-Esperance regions of Western Australia where it is commonly situated in damp areas, among granite boulders or on lateritic rises growing in sandy or loamy soils over granite or laterite. It is commonly part of Eucalyptus marginata woodlands and is found from the east of Albany to around Mount Manypeaks and another population is found around Mount Arid, much further to the east.

== See also ==
- List of Acacia species
