= Ursula Frayne Catholic College =

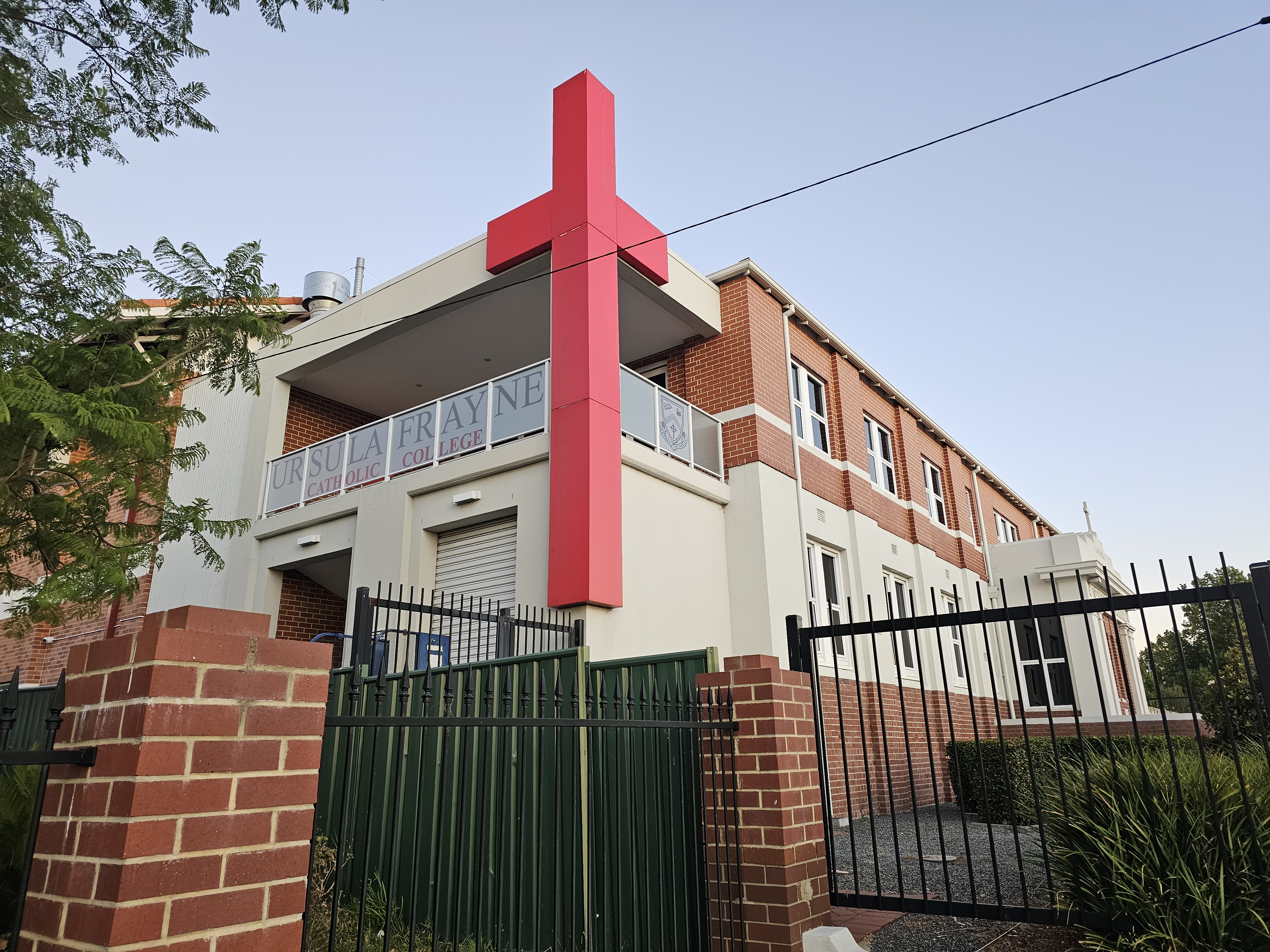

Location
- Perth, Western Australia; Australia; 31°58′21″S 115°53′54″E

Information
- Former names: Our Lady Help of Christians School; St Francis Xavier College; St Joachim's School
- Type: Independent co-educational primary and secondary day school
- Motto: Centred in Christ
- Religious affiliation: Sisters of Mercy
- Denomination: Roman Catholic
- Patron saint: Mother Ursula Frayne
- Established: 1899; 127 years ago (as St Joachim's School); 1990; 36 years ago (as Ursula Frayne Catholic College)
- Principal: Mark Antulov
- Years: K–12
- Enrolment: c. 1,030
- Campus: East Victoria Park (primary); Victoria Park (secondary)
- Colours: Black, white and red
- Slogan: Centred in Christ
- Website: ufcc.wa.edu.au

The Ursula Frayne Catholic College is a dual-campus independent Roman Catholic co-educational primary and secondary day school, located southeast of Perth, Western Australia. Students from Kindergarten to Year 6 are educated at the Balmoral street campus in East Victoria Park, while years 7 to 12 attend Frayne at the Duncan street campus in Victoria Park.

The college was established in its present form in 1990, but dates back to a school founded by the Sisters of Mercy, led by Mother Clare Buggy, in 1899. The school was named after Mother Ursula Frayne to publicly commemorate the first leader of the Sisters of Mercy and founder of many Catholic schools in Western Australia.

== History ==
A group of the Sisters of Mercy, led by Mother Clare Buggy, arrived from Ireland in 1899 and created their first school in the current place of the Duncan street campus, naming it St Joachim's School. Our Lady Help of Christians School was built in East Victoria Park in 1936 to supply education for newcomers to the suburb. In the 1950s, the Archbishop noticed that a boys' school had not yet been built in the south-east suburbs of Perth and so he asked the Congregation of Christian Brothers in Sydney for help, while the East Victoria Park parish donated land worth around £A 2,000, equivalent to A$79,600 in 2022. St. Francis Xavier College was finally finished in 1953 and was staffed by the Christian Brothers.

However, with declining enrolments at Xavier College, the college united with Our Lady Help of Christians School, and soon afterwards, amalgamated with St. Joachim's School in 1990 to become Ursula Frayne Catholic College.

== Notable alumni ==
- Phillip Pendal, a Liberal politician
- Sister Martin Kelly MBE, student at St Joachim's School 1939 to 1947 then Administrator at Catherine McAuley Centre. Died 11 July 1987.

== See also ==
- List of schools in the Perth metropolitan area
- Catholic education in Australia
