= Bon Marché Arcade =

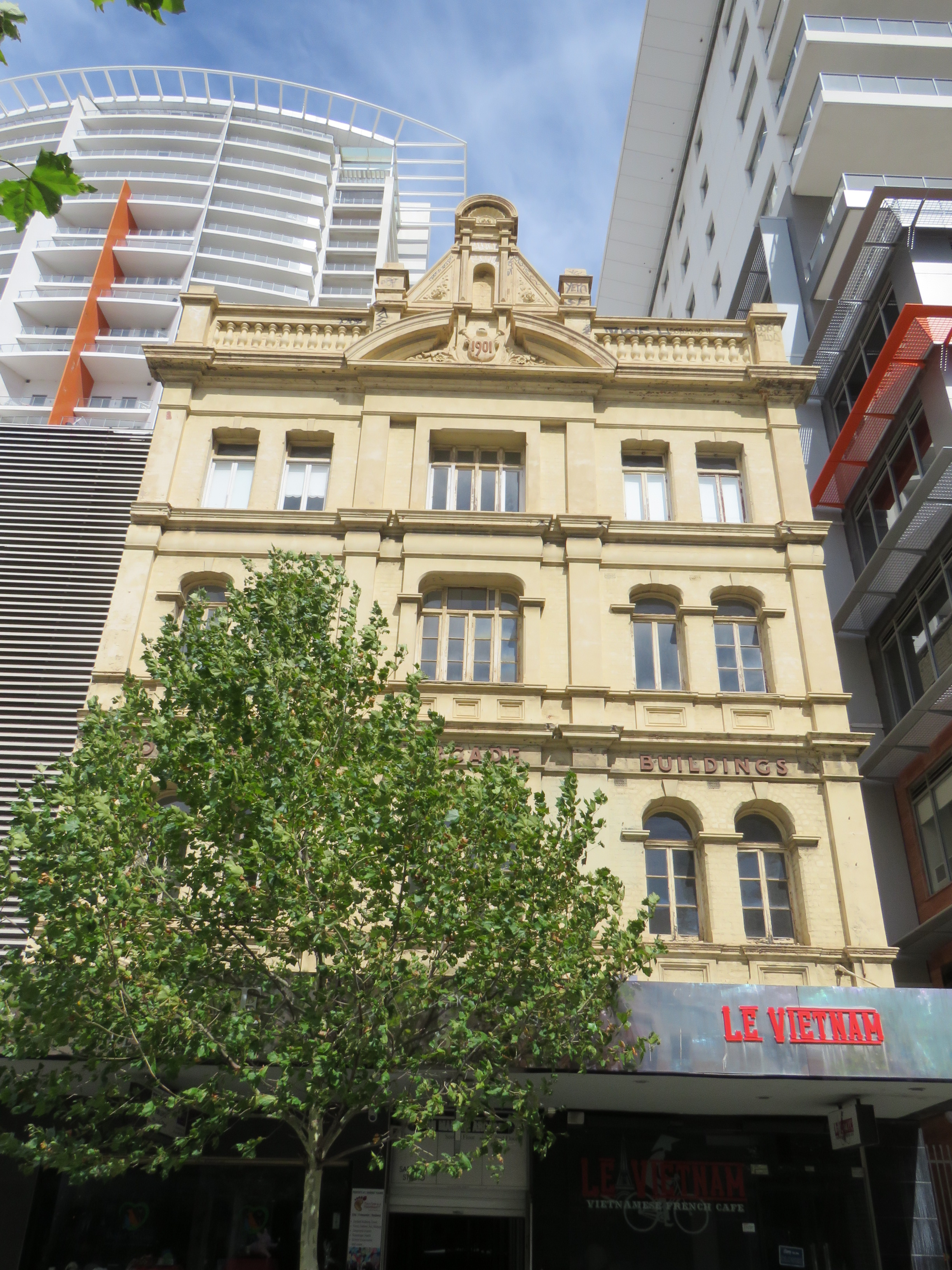
- The Bon Marché Arcade in January 2021
- Interactive map of the Bon Marché Arcade area

General information
- Type: Heritage listed building
- Location: 74-84 Barrack Street, Perth, Western Australia
- Coordinates: 31°57′15″S 115°51′39″E

Western Australia Heritage Register
- Type: State Registered Place
- Designated: 13 July 2007
- Reference no.: 1954

Bon Marché Arcade, also known as Bon Marché Buildings, is a heritage-listed building in Perth, Western Australia], located at 74–84 Barrack Street in the Perth central business district. It is three and four storeys tall, built in 1901 from brick in the Federation Free Classical architectural style, with a tin roof. Designed by architect H. J. Prockter, it was a prominent feature in Barrack Street when constructed, being taller than the one or two story buildings surrounding it.

== History ==
The site of the future Bon Marché Arcade was purchased by Bernard Stein, a Jewish bookbinder and former convict, in 1884 as a block of land. A building was constructed there in 1895, known as Stein's Buildings. In 1898 it was occupied by stock and share broker, an employment bureau, estate agents, printing works, an importer of Remington typewriters, a manufacturer's agent, and a financier, Henry Seeligson.

The building was purchased in 1899 by William Gordon Brookman, a property developer who had made his fortune in Kalgoorlie gold mines during the gold rushes. By 1901 Brookman had offices in the building, and other new tenants included the architects A. H. Smith and H. J. Prockter. Prockter designed a four-storey building to be constructed on the site, and Brookman received approval for the development on 21 September 1900. Construction occurred in stages so as to minimise disruption to the tenants. A three-storey addition was built at the rear, an additional storey was added to the existing structure, and there were extensive alterations to the interior and walls. Few sources record the work as additions and modifications of the existing structure, rather than a new building.

It was originally known as Brookman's Buildings when it was constructed in 1901 at 82 Barrack Street, named after Brookman. In 1919, Bon Marché Stores Ltd had bought the property for £A 4000, equivalent to A$356,000 in 2022, to expand their existing premises which ran between Hay Street and Murray Street. This followed the earlier sale to P. L. Smith by 1902, and subsequent ownership by Executor Trustee Agency Co. Ltd. of South Australia from 1913 to 1919.

In 1923, the company was granted a building licence for the neighbouring property at 80 Barrack Street, and paid £A 1,200 for the works. The name Bon Marché Buildings was used as early as 1929, and throughout the inter-war and World War Two years for the buildings at 78–82 Barrack Street, with the central arcade at 80 Barrack Street known as Bon Marché Arcade. The arcade led through to the rear of Bon Marché's Hay Street store.

In April 1954, David Jones bought a controlling interest in Bon Marché, and renamed the business to David Jones in August of that year. The closure and demolition of the Hay Street David Jones store in 1979 led to a vast decline in patronage of the arcade.

Renovations were undertaken in 1989, intended as restoration works, but without much regard for the original heritage fabric. The original pink terrazzo flooring was revealed when coverings were removed, inlaid with brass lettering of the arcade's name, but this was overlain with ceramic tiles. Additionally, large mirrors were used to line the arcade, instead of more authentic small squares. These defects in details on the ground floor were noted when the building was listed on the City of Perth's Municipal Heritage Inventory in 2001, though the upper levels were considered intact.

Bon Marché Arcade was purchased by new owners in 2019, who have plans for a heritage restoration. The building is still a landmark on Barrack Street, and the location of offices, shops, and a contemporary art gallery. In 2024, the Museum of Perth moved from the Atlas Building on the Esplanade, to the Arcade.
