= Atlas Building, Perth =

Heritage-listed building in Perth, Western Australia

Atlas Building
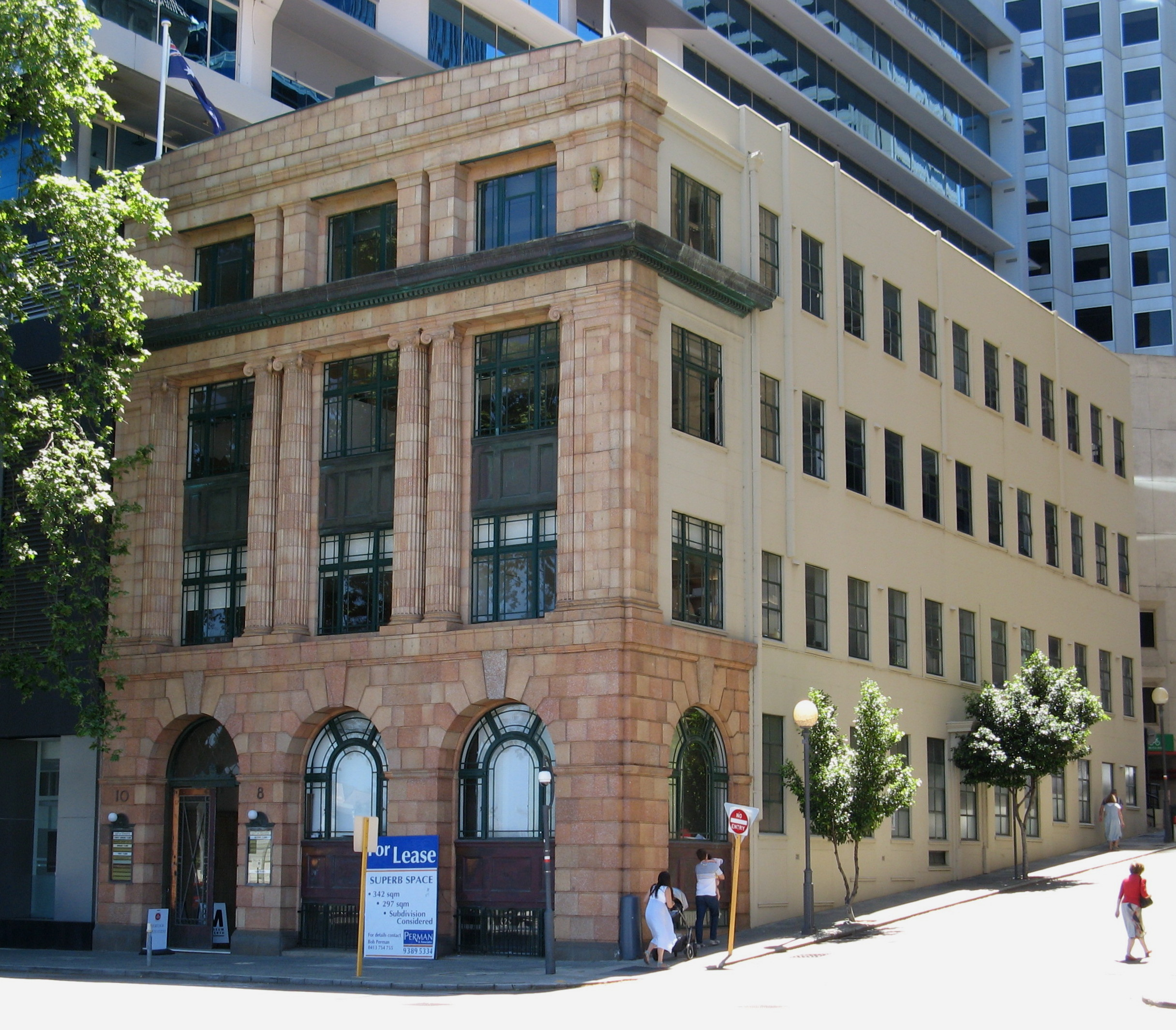
- Atlas Building in 2017
- Interactive map of the Atlas Building area

General information
- Type: Heritage listed building
- Location: Perth, Western Australia
- Coordinates: 31.956401°S 115.857989°E

Western Australia Heritage Register
- Type: State Registered Place
- Designated: 9 February 1996
- Reference no.: 1975

The Atlas Building is a heritage-listed building in Perth, Western Australia. It is located in the Perth central business district at 8–10 The Esplanade, and sits along the south-western side of Sherwood Court.

The construction of the building in the 1930s was well documented.

The building was constructed for the Atlas Assurance Company, in an Inter-War Free Classical style, with an art-deco entrance and lift. It has historical significance both architecturally and as one of few commercial developments in Perth constructed during the depression years. In addition to Atlas, occupants of the building have included:

- A. B. Webb School of Art – run by Archibald Bertram Webb
- Commonwealth Crown Solicitor's Office
- Conigrave & Co estate agents
- Hill, Mclean Pty Ltd – Western Australian wool buying firm
- Commonwealth Government's Legal Service Bureau
- Perth Road Board
- Women's Australian National Service
- The Museum of Perth was once located within the Atlas Building.
