= Lawson Apartments =

Building in Perth, Western Australia

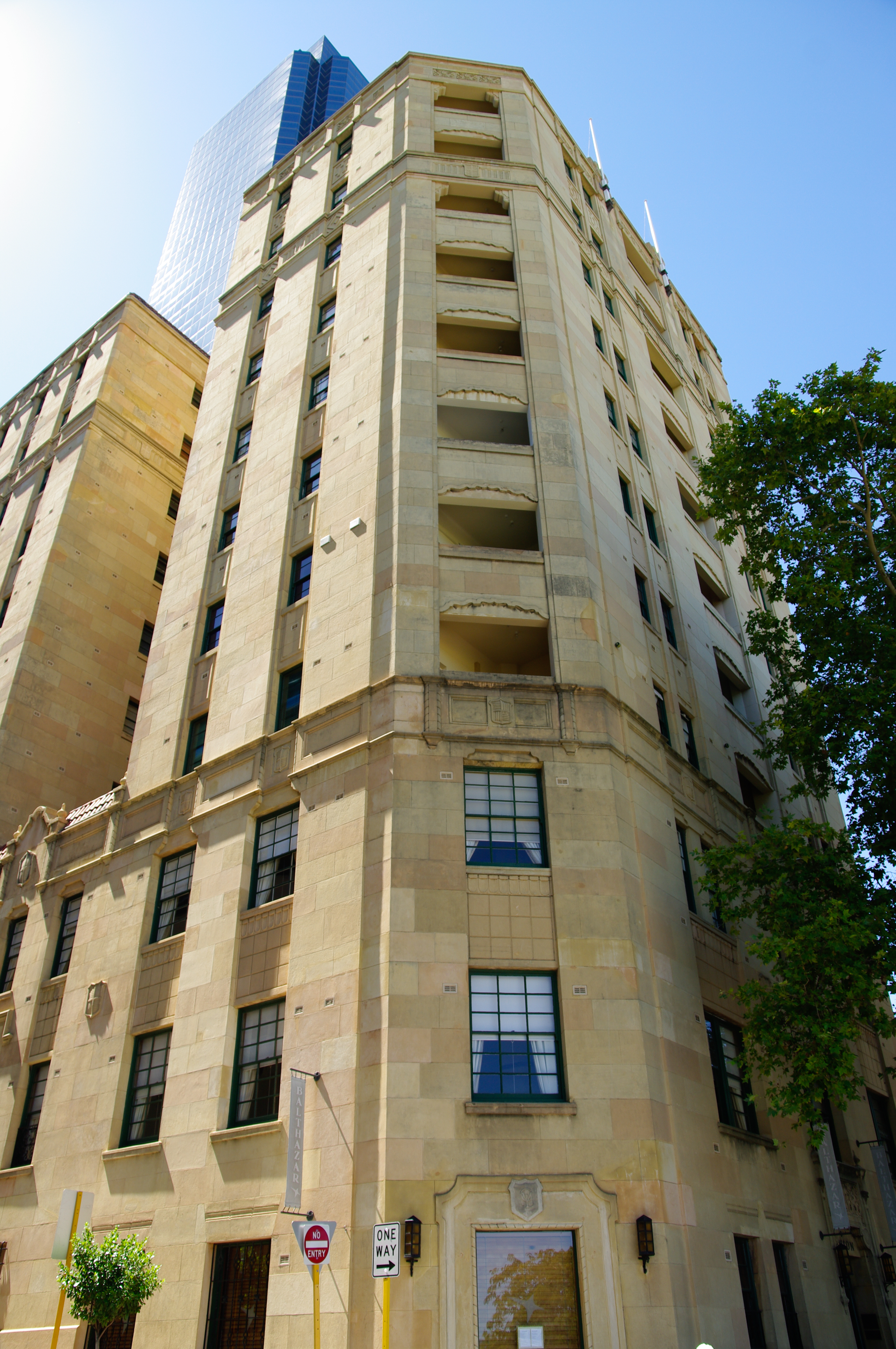
- Lawson Apartments, corner view Sherwood Court and The Esplanade
- Interactive map of the Lawson Apartments area
- Former names: Lawson Flats

General information
- Architectural style: Art deco
- Location: Perth, Western Australia, 2–4 Sherwood Court, Perth
- Coordinates: 31°57′23″S 115°51′30″E
- Construction started: November 1936
- Completed: 1937
- Renovated: 1987

Technical details
- Structural system: Reinforced concrete
- Floor count: 11

Design and construction
- Architects: Hennessy, Hennessy & Co; Reginald Summerhayes
- Structural engineer: Hennessy, Hennessy & Co
- Main contractor: Concrete Construction (W.A.) Ltd

Renovating team
- Architect: Oldham Boas Ednie-Brown Architects

Western Australia Heritage Register
- Type: State Registered Place
- Designated: 1 December 1995
- Reference no.: 2092

Lawson Apartments are located at 2–4 Sherwood Court near the corner with The Esplanade, in Perth, Western Australia. They are situated across the road from the Elizabeth Quay precinct (formerly the Esplanade Reserve) and adjacent to the Weld Club.

== History ==
The building, originally known as Lawson Flats, is an eleven-storey art deco apartment block, constructed in 1937, by the Colonial Mutual Life Assurance Society. It included a restaurant and a private club, the Perth Club, at the lower three floors and apartments above. The building was designed by Sydney architects Hennessy, Hennessy & Co in association with local architect, Reginald Summerhayes for rental purposes as a companion piece to the neighbouring Colonial Mutual Life building (1936–1980) on St Georges Terrace. When constructed, the two Colonial Mutual Life buildings were amongst the tallest in Perth. Its landmark status and prestigious location catered for an exclusive market in multi-residential building stock not known in Western Australia prior to the Inter-War years. The design features Spanish Mission and Art Deco styled ornamentation, evoking some of the allure of Hollywood. Internally, the H-shaped plan form provides for four apartments per floor, arranged in pairs in the twin palazzi form towers. During World War II, the headquarters of the State Cabinet were located in the building.

== Current use ==
The apartments were refurbished in 1986, following their sale by Colonial Mutual and they were subsequently strata titled and sold off individually in 1987. Four residential apartments are located on each floor, levels 3 to 10, inclusive.

The Perth Club premises, located on the ground floor and on levels 1 and 2, became the home for the Karrakatta Club with part of the ground floor shared with Balthazar, a fine-dining restaurant. The club relocated to the Lawson Apartments in 1986, following the sale of its former club premises on St Georges Terrace, before moving to ANZAC House in October 2020 and another members-only social club occupying the vacated premises after refurbishment.

== Heritage value ==
The building was classified by the National Trust on 4 May 1981 and included on the City of Perth's Municipal Heritage Inventory on 20 December 1985. The Building was placed on the permanent Register of the National Estate on 25 March 1986 and was permanently listed on the State Register of Heritage Places by the Heritage Council of Western Australia on 1 December 1995.
