= Emma Withnell =

Australian pastoralist (1842 – 1928)

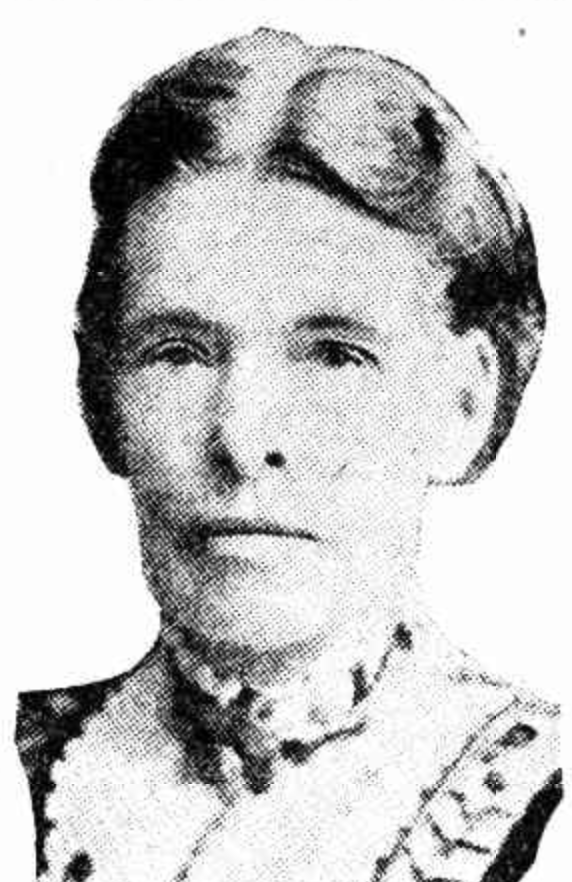
Emma Withnell

Emma Mary Withnell (née Hancock; 19 December 1842 – 16 May 1928), was the first white and female settler in north west Western Australia; a pioneering pastoralist and businessperson.

A member of the Hancock family, later prominent in Western Australia, Emma Hancock was born at Guildford, Western Australia. She and her husband, John Withnell (1825–98), began operating a pastoral lease – Mount Welcome station, on the Harding River in 1864. The station homestead became the site of the first town in the north west, Roebourne.

== Biography ==
Emma Hancock was born on 19 December 1842 in Guildford, Western Australia, the daughter of farmer George Hancock and his wife Sophia (née Gregory). On 10 May 1859, she married John Withnell, the son of a stonemason who had migrated in 1830. In 1864, in the hopes of starting a farm, Withnell, her husband, her two children, and her sister Francis moved to Port Walcott on the Sea Ripple; they encountered a shipwreck and lost most of their livestock. The family made their way on foot to the Harding River and Withnell gave birth to her third child near Mount Welcome. Withnell was known as Mother of the North West among the First Nations people in the area as she often tended to the sick and delivered babies in her own house. The indigenous community presented her with the title of "Boorong", which apparently gave her more leeway to interact with the various tribes in the region. Withnell and her husband would have eleven children in total. John Withnell died on 15 May 1898 with an estate valued at around £5895. Emma Withnell died on 16 May 1928 at Mount Lawley; the cause of death was cholecystitis. She was buried at the Anglican cemetery in Guildford.

In 2023 The West Australian newspaper identified 100 people who had shaped the state of Western Australia and they included the botanist Georgiana Molloy, suffragist Bessie Rischbieth, politician Edith Cowan, Sister Margaret O'Brien, Dr Roberta Jull, Amy Jane Best and Withnell.
