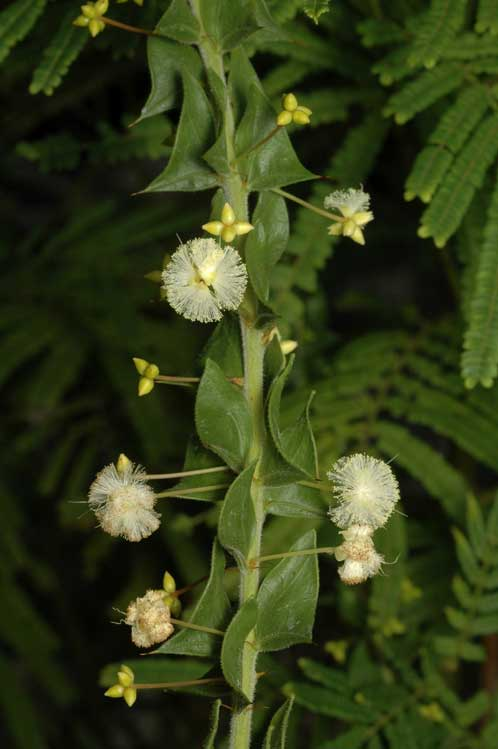
- In the Australian National Botanic Gardens

Scientific classification
- Kingdom: Plantae
- Clade: Embryophytes
- Clade: Tracheophytes
- Clade: Spermatophytes
- Clade: Angiosperms
- Clade: Eudicots
- Clade: Rosids
- Order: Fabales
- Family: Fabaceae
- Subfamily: Caesalpinioideae
- Clade: Mimosoid clade
- Genus: Acacia
- Species: A. phlebopetala

Binomial name
- Acacia phlebopetala Maslin
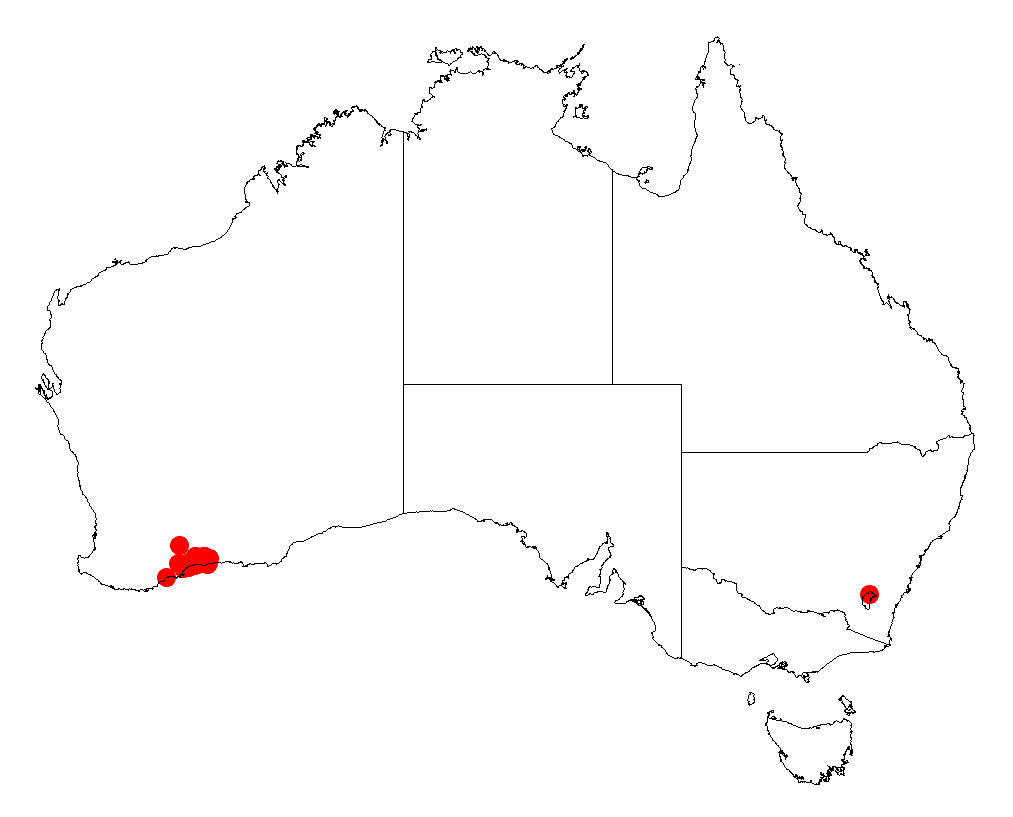
- Occurrence data from AVH

= Acacia phlebopetala =

Species of legume

Acacia phlebopetala is a shrub belonging to the genus Acacia and the subgenus Phyllodineae that is endemic to south western Australia.

== Description ==
The shrub typically grows to a height of 0.3 to 1.5 metres (1.0 to 4.9 ft). Like most species of Acacia it has phyllodes rather than true leaves. The evergreen, glabrous or hairy phyllodes appear crowded on the branchlets. The rigid and pungent phyllodes have an inequilateral to shallowly triangular shape with a length of 5 to 10 mm (0.20 to 0.39 in) and a width of 5 to 11 mm (0.20 to 0.43 in) and also has a midrib near the abaxial margin. It blooms from September to April and produces cream-white flowers.

== Taxonomy ==
There are two variations for this species:

- Acacia phlebopetala var. phlebopetala
- Acacia phlebopetala var. pubescens

== Distribution ==
It is native to an area in the Great Southern and Goldfields-Esperance regions of Western Australia where it is commonly situated on rocky cliffs, along watercourses, on sandplains and on coastal cliffs and dunes growing in sandy or loamy or clay soils often over or around limestone, laterite or quartzite. Its distribution extends from around Beaufort Inlet in the west to around Munglinup in the east, the bulk of the population being found in Fitzgerald River National Park with an isolated population between Lake King and Newdegate to the north west.

== See also ==
- List of Acacia species
