= Roberta Jull =

Australian medical doctor (1872 – 1961)

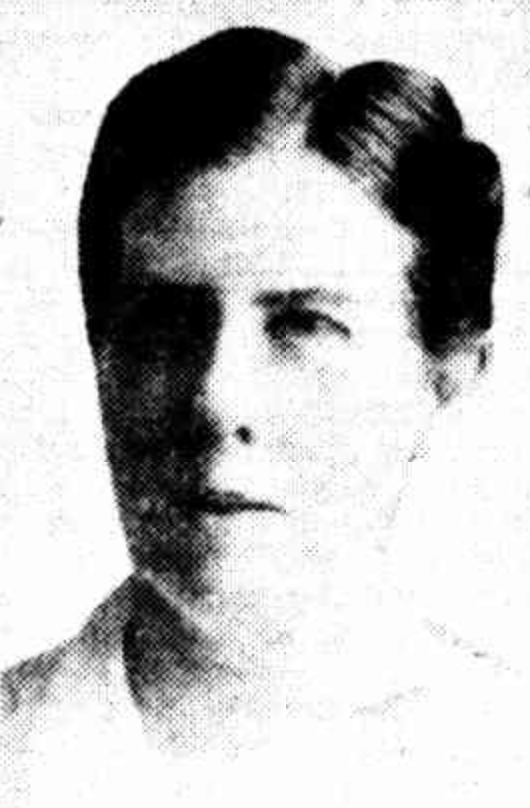
Dr Roberta Jull, c.1929

Roberta Henrietta Margaritta Jull (née Stewart, 16 August 1872 in Glasgow, Scotland – 6 March 1961 in Subiaco, Western Australia) was a medical doctor who, spurred by poor living conditions and high infant mortality, worked towards social reform.

== Early life ==
Roberta Stewart was born in Glasgow, Scotland the second of four children of Isabella Henrietta (née Fergusson) and Robert Stewart, a minister of the Free Church in Lisbon, Portugal. Roberta was educated in London and Scotland, returning to Portugal to care for her mother, who died in 1890. Her father encouraged her to achieve her educational ambitions in medicine, and, following her elder brother, with another brother attended the University of Glasgow. Women were excluded from lectures for male students, instead attending Queen Margaret College and the Royal Infirmary. She graduated MB CM (Bachelor of Medicine and Master of Surgery) in 1896, having spent an extra year studying eye diseases, then joined her brothers' medical practice at Guildford, Western Australia. Here she became dismayed by the living conditions and high infant mortality among her patients.

In 1897, having become a member of the influential Karrakatta Club, she became the first woman to establish a practice in Perth, Western Australia, taking a leading part in improving the standard of women's and infant health services in the state and becoming a respected force and agitator for social reform. In 1898, she was as a founding member of the British Medical Association, Western Australian Branch. Close associates included Edith Cowan and Lady Onslow. The group of well-connected and wealthy ladies actively petitioned the government for women's and social reform issues, establishing several reformist organisations.

In 1898 she married Martin Jull, Under Secretary for the Public Works Department and afterwards the state's first Public Service Commissioner for Western Australia. Her only daughter, Henrietta Drake-Brockman, was an Australian novelist and playwright.

In 1916 Jull became a member of the Senate for the University of Western Australia and, in this role, supported legislation requiring compulsory notification and treatment of venereal diseases and advocated for conscription.

She became Chief Medical Officer for schools at the Western Australian Public Health Department in 1925 and in 1930 was a member of the Australian delegation to the League of Nations congress.

Jull retired from public activities in 1945 owing to increasing deafness; she died in 1961 in Subiaco, and her ashes were scattered over her husband's grave.

Jull Place in the Canberra suburb of Chifley is named in her honour. In 1990, Stateships named a cargo ship the Roberta Jull.

In 2023 The West Australian newspaper identified the 100 people who had shaped the state of Western Australia and they included the botanist Georgiana Molloy, settler Emma Withnell, suffragist Bessie Rischbieth, politician Edith Cowan, school founder Amy Jane Best and Jull.
