= Sherwood Court, Perth =

Street in Perth, Western Australia

Coordinates: 31.9560°S 115.8583°E

Sherwood Court, Perth Western Australia
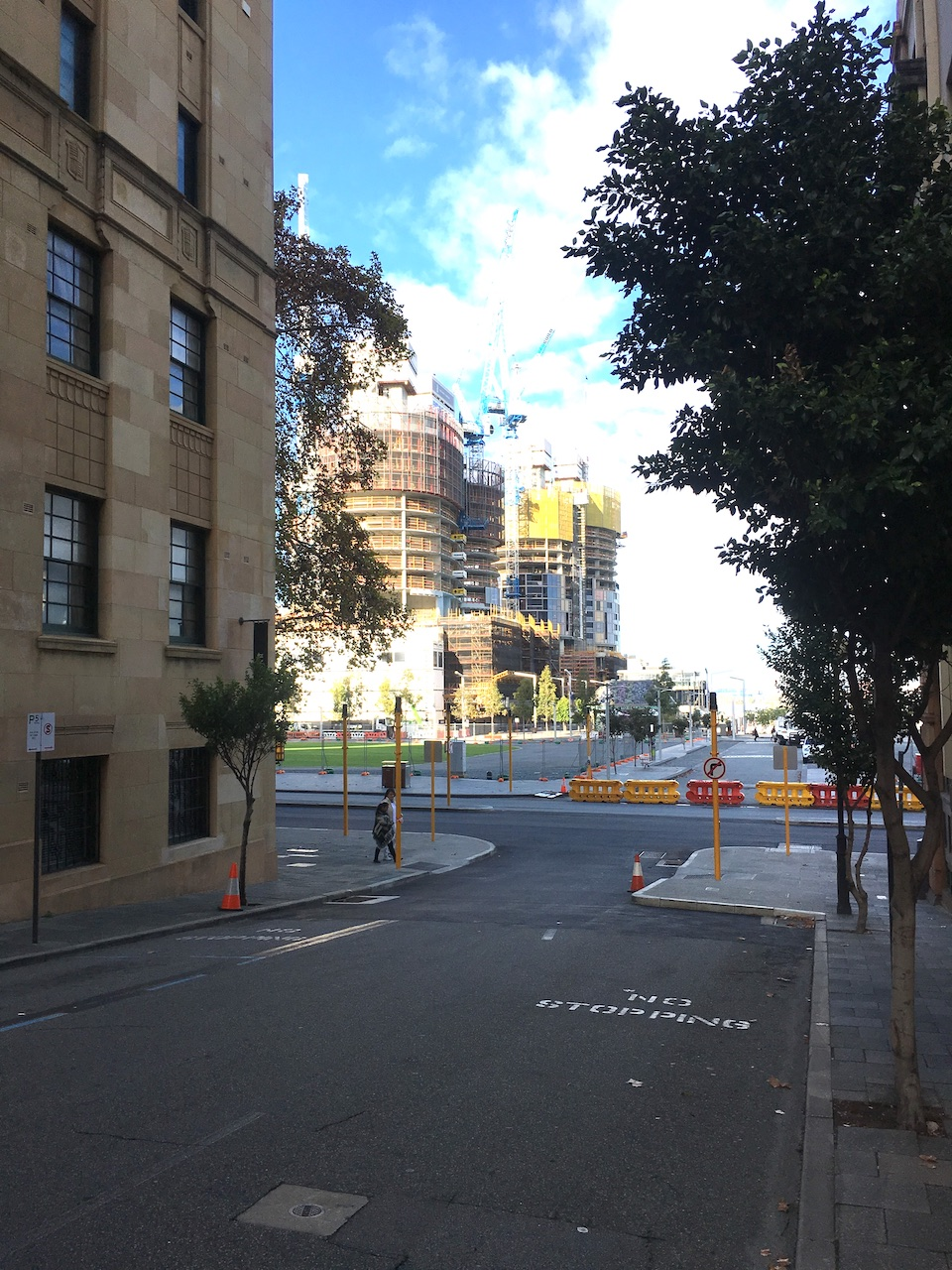
- View from Sherwood Court toward constructions at Elizabeth Quay

General information
- Type: Street
- Length: 140 m (500 ft)

Major junctions
- North end: St Georges Terrace
- South end: Duchess Way; The Esplanade (State Route 5)

Location(s)
- Suburb(s): Perth

Sherwood Court is a 140 metre road in the Perth central business district, Western Australia. It runs from St Georges Terrace to The Esplanade with Allendale Square on the upper corner, and Lawson Apartments on the lower.

It sits across from London Court and allows pedestrian access between the Perth central business district and The Esplanade and Perth foreshore.

During World War II, various offices of services relating to the war effort were housed in Sherwood Court and before offices were made elsewhere, sections of the Perth Road Board were located there as well. The Atlas Building, although facing the Esplanade, takes up the south western side of the street across from the Lawson Apartments.

The Allendale Square and Exchange Plaza buildings now take up considerable space of former structures in the street.

On 4 March 1973 it became a one way street in a southerly direction in a pairing arrangement with Howard Street.

== Intersections ==
LGA	Location	km	mi	Destinations	Notes
Perth	Perth	0	0.0	St Georges Terrace	Sherwood Court is one-way southbound; left turn from St Georges Terrace westbound onto Sherwood Court only
Perth	Perth	0.14	0.087		Traffic light controlled; Sherwood Court and Duchess Way are one-way southbound; no right turn from The Esplanade eastbound to Duchess Way or Sherwood Court to The Esplanade westbound
1.000 mi = 1.609 km; 1.000 km = 0.621 mi: Incomplete access
