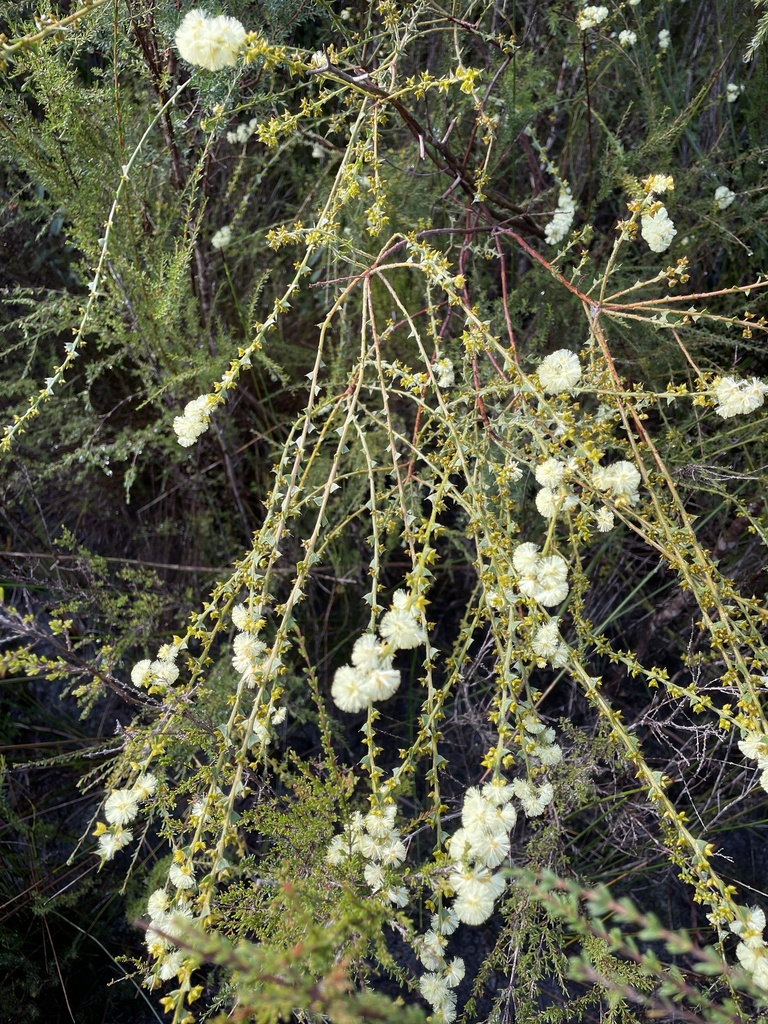
- Near Carbunup

Scientific classification
- Kingdom: Plantae
- Clade: Tracheophytes
- Clade: Angiosperms
- Clade: Eudicots
- Clade: Rosids
- Order: Fabales
- Family: Fabaceae
- Subfamily: Caesalpinioideae
- Clade: Mimosoid clade
- Genus: Acacia
- Species: A. mooreana

Binomial name
- Acacia mooreana W.Fitzg.
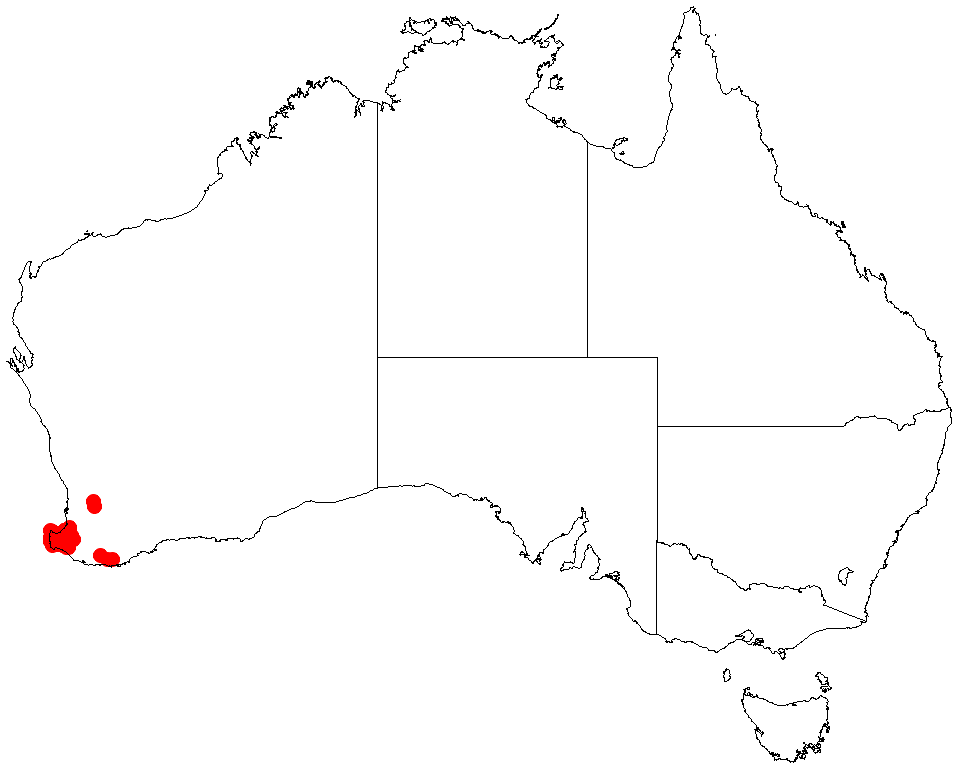
- Occurrence data from AVH

Synonyms
- Racosperma mooreanum (W.Fitzg.) Pedley; Acacia biflora auct. non R.Br.: Meisner, C.D.F. in Lehmann, J.G.C. (ed.) (1848)

= Acacia mooreana =

Species of legume

Acacia mooreana is a species of flowering plant in the family Fabaceae, and is endemic to the south-west of Western Australia. It is an erect, slender shrub with yellow-ribbed, more or less glabrous branchlets, triangular phyllodes with the narrower end towards the base, the lower edge continuous with the branchlets, spherical heads of cream-coloured to pale yellow flowers, and narrowly oblong, leathery to crusty pods.

== Description ==
Acacia mooreana is an erect, slender, sharply pointed shrub that typically grows to a height of 0.3–1 m (1 ft 0 in – 3 ft 3 in) and has yellow-ribbed, more or less glabrous branchlets. Its phyllodes are triangular to shallowly triangular with the narrower end towards the base and more or less continuous with the branchlets, 4–6 mm (0.16–0.24 in) wide, 3–6 mm (0.12–0.24 in) wide and sharply pointed with a prominent gland bearing angle on the upper edge. The flowers are borne in spherical heads in axils, on a peduncle 2–4 mm (0.079–0.157 in) long, each head with 4 cream-coloured to pale yellow flowers. The pods are narrowly oblong, up to 70 mm (2.8 in) long, about 4 mm (0.16 in) wide, leathery to crusty, glabrous and blackish. The seeds are glossy brown and have an aril.

== Taxonomy ==
Acacia mooreana was first formally described in 1904 by William Vincent Fitzgerald in the Journal of the West Australian Natural History Society. The specific epithet (mooreana) honours Mr. Newton J. Moore, "a well-known authority on West Australian forestry, and a member of the Royal Commission dealing with that subject".

== Distribution ==
This species of wattle grows in sand, often in swampy areas and along creeks in open forest from Yallingup and Boyanup, south to near Augusta and Nannup, in the Jarrah Forest, Swan Coastal Plain and Warren bioregions of south-western Western Australia.

== See also ==
- List of Acacia species
