= Acacia incrassata =

Scientific classification
- Kingdom: Plantae
- Clade: Embryophytes
- Clade: Tracheophytes
- Clade: Spermatophytes
- Clade: Angiosperms
- Clade: Eudicots
- Clade: Rosids
- Order: Fabales
- Family: Fabaceae
- Subfamily: Caesalpinioideae
- Clade: Mimosoid clade
- Genus: Acacia
- Species: A. incrassata

Binomial name
- Acacia incrassata Hook.
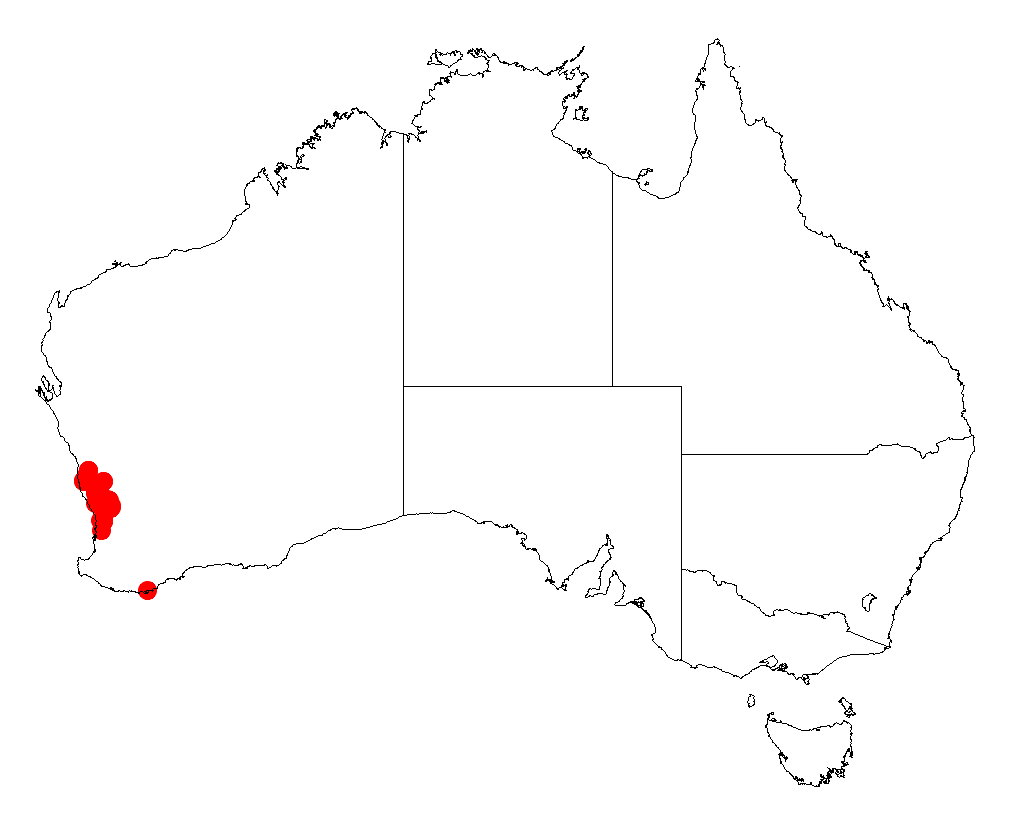
- Occurrence data from AVH

Synonyms
- Acacia decipiens var. incrassata (Hook.) Benth.; Acacia vernicosa W.Fitzg.; Racosperma incrassatum (Hook.) Pedley

Species of legume

Acacia incrassata is a species of flowering plant in the family Fabaceae and is endemic to the south-west of Western Australia. It is an erect shrub or subshrub that spreads by underground runners and has prominently ribbed branchlets. Its phyllodes are inequilateral, usually triangular or Δ-shaped with the narrower end towards the base, the flowers borne in spherical heads and the pods narrowly oblong, crusty and glabrous.

== Description ==
Acacia incrassata is an erect shrub or subshrub that typically grows to a height of 15–30 cm (5.9–11.8 in), spreads by underground runners, and has prominently ribbed branchlets. Its phyllodes are inequilateral, usually triangular or Δ-shaped with the narrower end towards the base, the lower edge often on the same alignment as the branchlet, 5–12 mm (0.20–0.47 in) long and 4–10 mm (0.16–0.39 in) wide. The phyllodes are more or less wavy, more or less sharply pointed, often slightly shiny with a prominent midvein near the lower edge. There are hardened, sometimes spiny stipules 1.5–3 mm (0.059–0.118 in) wide at the base of the phyllodes.

The flowers are borne in a spherical head in axils on a peduncle 4–8 mm (0.16–0.31 in) long, each head usually with 6 to 9 golden yellow flowers. Flowering usually occurs from July to August, and the pods are narrowly oblong, slightly curved, up to 50 mm (2.0 in) long, 4–5 mm (0.16–0.20 in) wide, crusty and glabrous with thickened margins. The seeds are oblong, shiny greenish-grey with a small aril.

== Taxonomy ==
Acacia incrassata was first formally described in 1841 by William Jackson Hooker in his Icones Plantarum from specimens collected near the Swan River settlement by James Drummond. The specific epithet (incrassata) means 'made thick', referring to the edges of the phyllodes.

== Distribution and habitat ==
This species of wattle occurs from around Mount Lesueur and south to Kalamunda, also from around Serpentine. A variant occurs near Watheroo. The species grows in Eucalyptus wandoo woodlands or in sand or loamy gravel in low heath, in the Avon Wheatbelt, Geraldton Sandplains, Jarrah Forest and Swan Coastal Plain bioregions in the south-west of Western Australia.

== Conservation status ==
Acacia incrassata is listed as 'not threatened' by the Western Australian Government Department of Biodiversity, Conservation and Attractions.

== See also ==
- List of Acacia species
