= The Esplanade (Perth) =

Road in Perth, Western Australia

The Esplanade, Perth Western Australia

General information
- Type: Road
- Length: 350 m (1,100 ft)
- Route number(s): State Route 5

Major junctions
- East end: Barrack Street (State Routes 53 and 5)
- West end: Mounts Bay Road; William Street (State Routes 53 and 5)

Location(s)
- Major suburbs: Perth

The Esplanade is a road between Barrack Street and William Street in the Perth central business district.

It follows the edge of the Elizabeth Quay area that has been developed on Perth Water, and has had notable buildings and areas adjacent to its short route.

The properties on the street include CSBP offices (now Wesfarmers House) that followed the demolition of the Esplanade Hotel, the Griffin Centre, and the Atlas Building.

The junction with Sherwood Court shares the Lawson Apartments and with Barrack Street, the Weld Club.

== Intersections ==
LGA	Location	km	mi	Destinations	Notes
Perth	Perth	0	0.0	Barrack Street (State Routes 53 and 5)	Traffic light controlled
Perth	Perth	0.13	0.081	Sherwood Court / Duchess Way	Traffic light controlled; Sherwood Court and Duchess Way are one-way southbound; no right turn from The Esplanade eastbound to Duchess Way or Sherwood Court to The Esplanade westbound
Perth	Perth	0.24	0.15	Howard Street / Enchantress Way	Give way sign controlled, giving The Esplanade priority; Howard Street is one-way southbound; no right turns from The Esplanade or through traffic from Howard Street to Enchantress Way
Perth	Perth	0.35	0.22	Mounts Bay Road / William Street (State Routes 53 and 5)	Traffic light controlled; no right turn from The Esplanade westbound to William Street northbound or William Street southbound to Mounts Bay Road westbound, no left turn from William Street northbound to Mounts Bay Road westbound; The Esplanade continues west as Mounts Bay Road
1.000 mi = 1.609 km; 1.000 km = 0.621 mi: Incomplete access
