= Georgiana Molloy =

Botanical collector

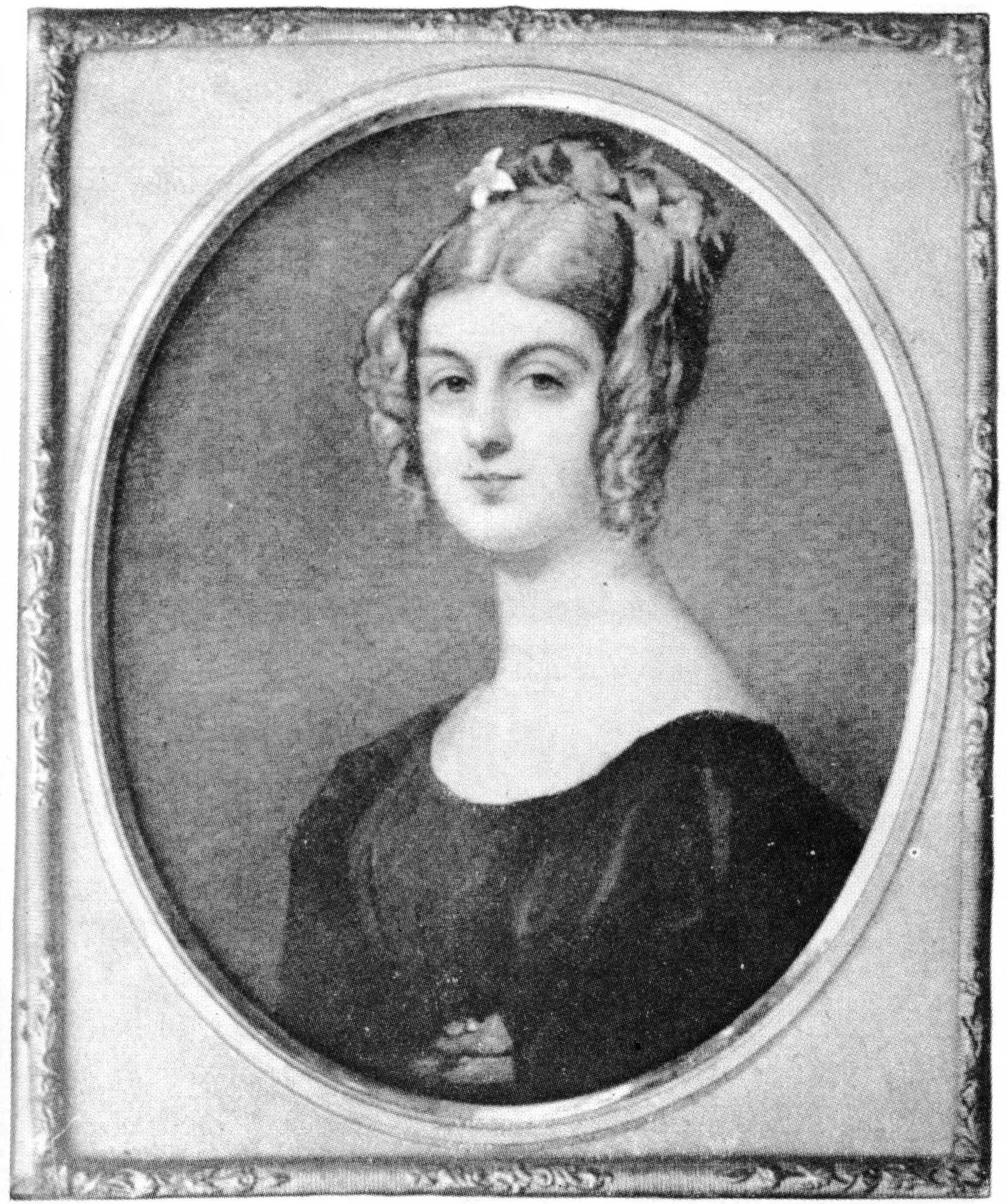
- Georgiana Molloy, taken from a miniature painted before she left England in 1829
- Born: 23 May 1805; Cumberland, England
- Died: 8 April 1843 (aged 37); Busselton, Western Australia
- Spouse: John Molloy
- Scientific career
- Fields: Botany

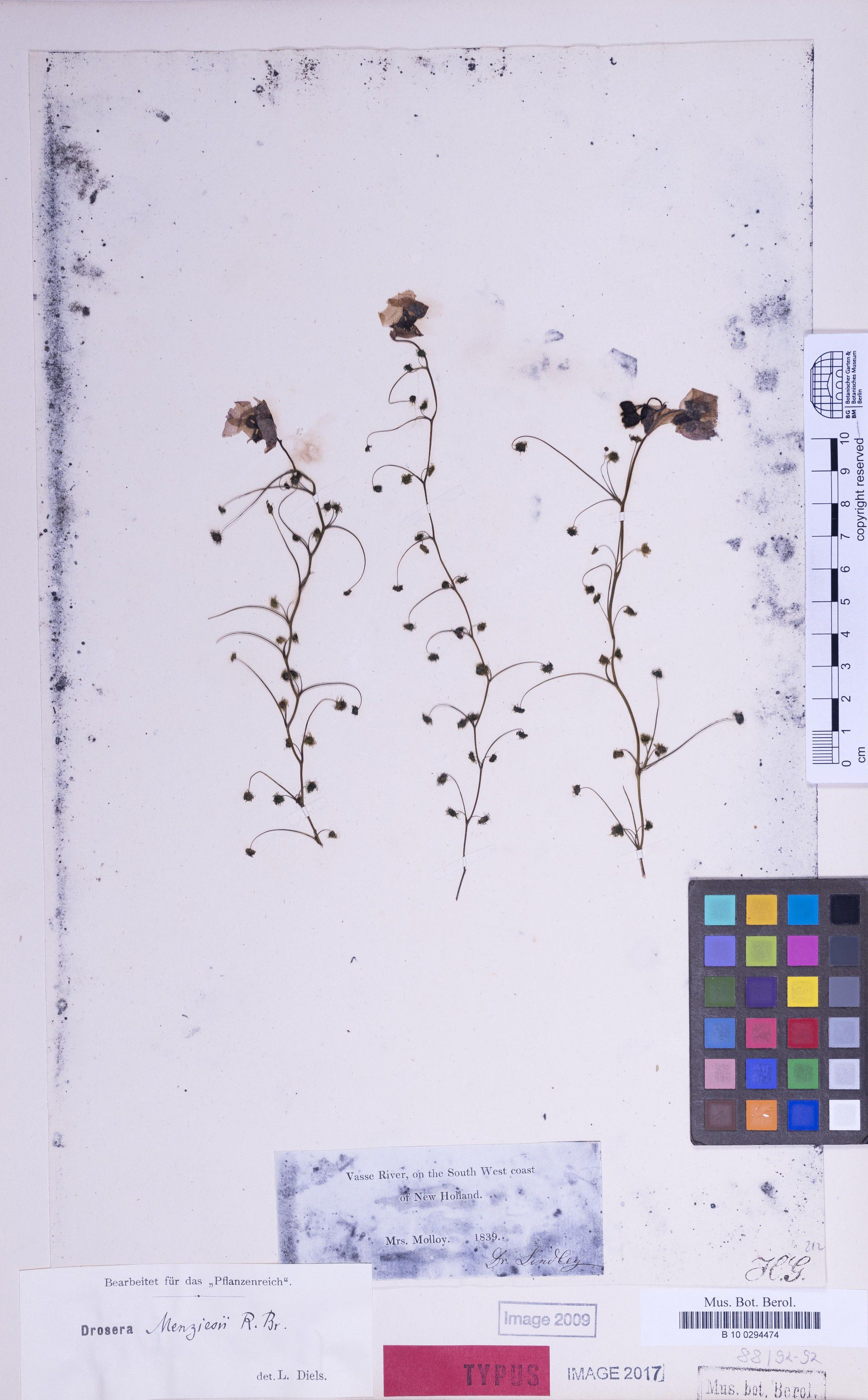
Type specimen: Drosera menziesii collected by Georgiana Molloy

Georgiana Molloy (23 May 1805 – 8 April 1843) was an early settler in Western Australia, who is remembered as one of the first botanical collectors in the colony. Her husband, John, was involved in the Wonnerup massacre, and she has been the subject of research into how records and family history documents obfuscate the telling of those events.

== Life ==
=== Early life and migration ===
Georgiana Molloy was born Georgiana Kennedy in Cumberland on 23 May 1805. In her youth she was caught up in the Christian revival sparked by the preacher Edward Irving but implemented in a milder manner by Rev. Story of Rosneath. She became deeply religious, unusually so, even for the educated classes. She became distant from her own family in both sentiment and geography when she went to stay in Scotland with the Dunlop family at Keppoch House, near Helensburgh. Early in 1829, she accepted a marriage proposal from Captain John Molloy, and they were married on 6 August of that year. Shortly afterward, the Molloys sailed for the Swan River Colony in Western Australia on board Warrior. The couple then decided to join with a number of other settlers, including the Bussell family, in forming a new subcolony at Augusta.

=== Botanical work ===
Until 1836, Molloy's life was one of great hardship, typical of early settlers in Western Australia but unfamiliar to one of her social class in England. The trials of a settler's life were relentless and she birthed her first and most of her subsequent babies without medical assistance. She lost her first child shortly after birth and later her only son drowned in a well. She was vigorous in body, mind and soul and applied herself to the subsistence life. Initially she felt disdain for the local native flora. However, in December 1836, she received a letter from Captain James Mangles, asking her to collect botanical specimens for him. This letter fired in Molloy a great passion for botany. Thereafter, together with her husband John, and local indigenous women, she spent nearly all of her leisure time in collecting, collating and documenting botanical specimens of the south west of Western Australia. According to National Geographic this area is "one of the world's 34 internationally recognised biodiversity hotspots".

Mangles had arranged for a number of people in the colony to collect specimens for him, but had been disappointed with the results. The specimens sent by James Drummond, a professional botanist, were poorly packed and carelessly labelled, and seeds consistently failed to germinate. Other collectors were more careful but largely unskilled. In contrast, Molloy's collections were "full of pressed plants mounted and set out with delicacy and precision, and carefully numbered... showing great evidence of care and cleanliness in the sorting" (Hasluck 1955). Mangles broke up Molloy's collections, sending seeds to a number of horticulturists and botanists throughout England. A number of horticulturists had great success growing from Molloy's seeds, and many new species were described. John Lindley, Professor of Botany at University College London, for example, described many new species from her collections, including Corymbia calophylla. The database, Bionomia, shows that the Global Biodiversity Information Facility collections of specimen data (databased from many contributing herbaria) show 25 specimens collected by her. However, eight of these are types: Boronia ovata, Drosera menziesii, Diuris carinata, Diuris corymbosa, Caladenia gemmata, Caladenia unguiculata, Caladenia hirta, and Boronia dichotoma.

In 1839 the Molloy family moved to the Busselton district. Georgiana was visited by botanists Ludwig Preiss in 1839 and Drummond in 1842. She continued to collect seed, making use of the knowledge of the local Indigenous Australians, and she taught herself the rudiments of botany from books sent to her by Mangles.

=== Husband's involvement in Wardandi massacre ===
In 1841 Georgiana's husband John and the Bussell brothers led a massacre of dozens of Wardandi Noongar people in reprisal for the spearing of George Layman. This information is generally not included in publications discussing her life and none of the surviving letters and diaries of Georgiana mention this occurrence. Angela Campbell, who researched Georgiana Molloy for 10 years before finding out about the massacre was shocked to discover this "devastating" information. Campbell's paper about this is titled "The Ethics of Writing Performance from the Archive: The Case of Georgiana Molloy". A second researcher, Jessica White, who also spent several years researching Georgiana without finding any mention of John's involvement in the massacre, has also written a paper – "'Paper Talk,' Testimony and Forgetting in South-West Western Australia" – on how "the massacre had been depicted in such a way as to obfuscate John Molloy’s role".

== Death and legacy ==
Molloy suffered bouts of ill health after each of her pregnancies. Following the birth of her seventh child, she fell ill and failed to recover. On 8 April 1843, three months after the birth, she died. It was a long and dreadful death with Molloy suffering greatly. She was bed-ridden from December 1842 until her death in April the following year during the Australian summer. On hearing of her death, George Wailes, a horticulturist who had been most successful in growing from Molloy's seeds, wrote to Mangles:

Not one in ten thousand who go out into distant lands has done what she did for the Gardens of her Native Country, and we have indeed as regards her specially to lament, that "From Life's rosy Chaplet, the Gems drop away."

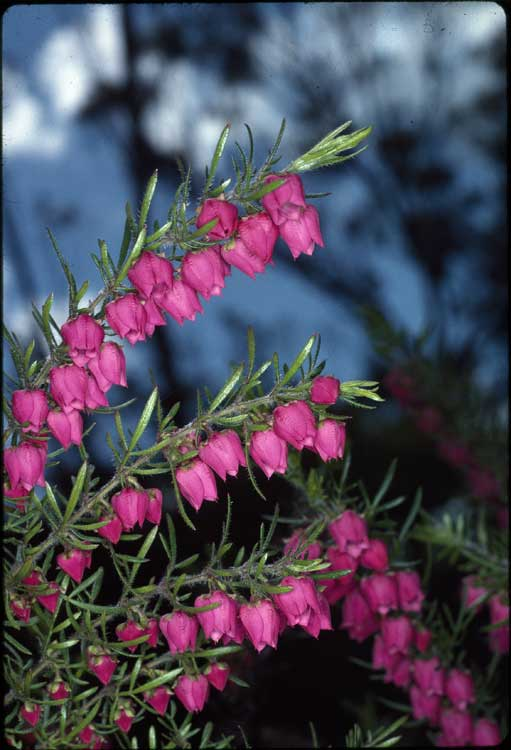
Boronia molloyae named for Molloy

Molloy was recognised for her contributions to the description of the Western Australian flora. The shrub Boronia molloyae was named in her honour, as was Molloy Crescent in the Canberra suburb of Cook. Molloy Island, also named after her, is located in the Hardy Inlet at the junction of the Blackwood and Scott Rivers 4 kilometres (2 mi) north of the mouth of the Blackwood River at Augusta. Her specimens are held at the University of Cambridge Herbarium, The Herbarium of the Royal Botanic Gardens Kew, the Herbarium of the Botanic Garden and Botanical Museum Berlin-Dahlem, and the Herbarium of the University of Montpellier.

She has a school (Georgiana Molloy Anglican School) named after her in the Busselton suburb of Yalyalup.

Three biographies have been published: Georgiana Molloy, Portrait with Background by Alexandra Hasluck; An All Consuming Passion: Origins, Modernity and the Australian Life of Georgiana Molloy by William J. Lines and, in 2016, Georgiana Molloy, the mind that shines by Bernice Barry.

Molloy wrote a number of diaries and many letters which have provided a unique personal narrative. They are held at the Battye Library in Perth, Western Australia and the Cumbria Archive Centre in Carlisle, UK. Many of her letters are cross-written due to the shortage of paper in the isolated colony of Augusta.

Molloy was added to the Anglican Church of Australia 1995 calendar, where her name appears on 8 April, as a "pioneer church leader and botanist from Western Australia". She may be commemorated in church on that day in Matins and Evensong and at the Holy Communion.

In 2023 The West Australian identified 100 people who had shaped the state of Western Australia and they included the teacher Amy Jane Best, the educationalist Ursula Frayne, settler Emma Withnell, suffragist Bessie Rischbieth, politician Edith Cowan, Dr Roberta Jull and Molloy.
