= List of State Register of Heritage Places in the City of Perth =

List of heritage places in Perth, Western Australia

The State Register of Heritage Places is maintained by the Heritage Council of Western Australia. As of 2026, 1,032 places are heritage-listed in the City of Perth, (Note: This search yields 1,263 results of which 1,049 are for the City of Perth, 198 are for the City of South Perth, ten are for the City of Vincent, three are for the City of Melville, two are for the Town of Victoria Park and one is for the City of Belmont.) of which 226 are on the State Register of Heritage Places. (Note: This search yields 248 results of which 228 are for the City of Perth, 18 are for the City of South Perth and two are for the City of Melville, these two being the Canning Bridge east- and westbound which connects the two latter cities.)

== List ==
The Western Australian State Register of Heritage Places, as of 2026, lists the following 226 state registered places within the City of Perth:

Place name	Place #	Street number	Street name	Co-ordinates	Suburb or town	Notes & former names	Photo
Commercial Building ^{†}	1178	132	William Street	31.952055°S 115.857934°E	Perth	Demolished in 2004	
W D & H O Wills Warehouse (former)	1330	464–468	Murray Street	31.950274°S 115.852024°E	Perth		
Bairds Building (former)	1627	491–493	Wellington Street	31.951753°S 115.858664°E	Perth	Levi Green's, Green's, Bairds Arcade, Myers, Commercial Building 491–493 Wellington Street	
Saunders Building ^{†}	1628	499	Wellington Street	^{[?]}	Perth	Demolished in 2004	
Mitchells Building ^{†}	1784	140	William Street	31.951763°S 115.858072°E	Perth		
Nedlands Park Masonic Hall	1828	8	Broadway	Crawley	31.977593°S 115.814261°E		
Commercial Building ^{†}	1857	507	Wellington Street	^{[?]}	Perth		
St John's Lutheran Church	1943	16	Aberdeen Street	31.947848°S 115.862232°E	Perth		
Supreme Court Buildings and Gardens, Old Court House, Stirling Gardens	1947	2, 4 & 33	Barrack Street	31.957835°S 115.859959°E	Perth	Washington Palm Trees, The Supreme Court Building	
Old Court House	1948		Supreme Court Gardens, Barrack Street	31.9576°S 115.8605°E	Perth	Old Court House Law Museum, Francis Burt Law Centre/Legal Education Centre, Law Society Building	
Orchestral Shell ^{†}	1949		Supreme Court Gardens, Barrack Street	^{[?]}	Perth	Demolished in 1999	
The Weld Club	1950	3	Barrack Street	31.95678°S 115.859°E	Perth		
Perth Town Hall	1953	601	Hay Street	31.95492°S 115.860478°E	Perth	HMAS Perth Memorial	
Bon Marché Arcade	1954	74–84	Barrack Street	31.95424°S 115.860797°E	Perth	Brookman's Buildings, Bon Marche Arcade Buildings	
Railway Hotel (remains of facade & balcony) ^{†}	1959	138	Barrack Street	31.952899°S 115.861063°E	Perth	Commercial Hotel, Romayne's Hotel	
Phineas Seeligson's (former), Perth	1961	143	Barrack Street	31.952552°S 115.861°E	Perth	Commercial Building, City Loans Office	
Art Gallery & Museum Buildings	1962	5	Francis Street	31.949753°S 115.862003°E	Perth	Western Australian Museum Complex, comprises Victoria Jubilee Institute, Victoria Public Library, Jubilee Building, Government Geologist's Building	
Perth Court of Petty Sessions	1963		James Street Mall	31.950944°S 115.8615°E	Perth	Centenary Gallery	
Old Court House & Gaol	1965	5	Francis Street	31.949675°S 115.861906°E	Perth	Art Gallery (east wing)	
Protestant Hall (former), Perth	1969	160–162	Beaufort Street	31.947967°S 115.864133°E	Northbridge		
Central Government Offices	1973	28	Barrack Street	31.95544°S 115.860448°E	Perth		
Atlas Building	1975	8–10	The Esplanade	31.956401°S 115.857989°E	Perth	Phoenix Building	
St Brigid's Convent (former)	1976	60	John Street	31.944384°S 115.852552°E	Northbridge		
St Brigid's Church	1977	Corner	Fitzgerald & Aberdeen Streets	31.9441°S 115.853°E	Northbridge		
St Brigid's High School	1978		Fitzgerald Street	31.94444°S 115.853156°E	Northbridge		
Perth General Post Office	1979	3	Forrest Place	31.952215°S 115.858855°E	Perth	Perth GPO	
Swan Barracks	1980	2	Francis Street	31.948832°S 115.862255°E	Perth	Former Drill Hall	
St George's Hall Portico and Facade, Perth	1985	500	Hay Street	31.955455°S 115.863214°E	Perth	St. George's Theatre (former)	
Cremorne Arcade	1988	572–578	Hay Street	31.954669°S 115.861394°E	Perth		
Criterion Hotel	1989	560	Hay Street	31.955°S 115.8617°E	Perth	Regatta Hotel, Bugatti's Bar	
McNess Royal Arcade	1990	613–619	Hay Street	31.954772°S 115.859952°E	Perth		
Connor Quinlan Building	1991	612–616	Hay Street	31.954451°S 115.860142°E	Perth	Sharpes Tobacconists, Swan Chambers, Quinlan Swan Building	
Theatre Royal & Metropole Hotel (former)	1993	637–645	Hay Street	31.95462°S 115.859299°E	Perth	Sussan House, Theatre Royale	
London Court	1998	647–653	Hay Street Mall	31.954693°S 115.858989°E	Perth		
Devon House	2000	729	Hay Street	31.953811°S 115.857252°E	Perth		
Gledden Building	2002	731	Hay Street Mall	31.954827°S 115.860351°E	Perth		
Wesley Church	2003	75	William Street	31.9533°S 115.857°E	Perth		
Melbourne Hotel (former)	2005	942	Hay Street	31.951501°S 115.851484°E	Perth	Old Melbourne	
His Majesty's Theatre	2006	825–839	Hay Street	31.953078°S 115.854439°E	Perth	Her Majesty's Hotel & Theatre	
Harper's Buildings	2007	810–820	Hay Street	31.952731°S 115.855202°E	Perth		
18 & 20 Howard Street	2023	18 & 20	Howard Street	31.955596°S 115.857379°E	Perth	Phoenix Chambers (20 Howard St), Traders Building (former)	
Commercial Building	2024	21	Howard Street	31.955458°S 115.857143°E	Perth	Downing & Downing, 21 Howard Street, Parker & Parker Bldg, WA Turf Club fmr	
Art Gallery Administration Building	2025		James Street Mall	31.950184°S 115.861299°E	Perth	Police Barracks (former), Police Headquarters and CIB Administration	
Hackett Hall	2026		Perth Cultural Centre	31.949592°S 115.8613°E	Northbridge	Perth Public Library, State Reference Library (former)	
Chung Wah Association Hall	2027	128	James Street	31.947945°S 115.857523°E	Northbridge	includes Chung Wah Banner	
PICA & Arts House	2028		James Street Mall	31.9498°S 115.86018°E	Perth	Perth Institute of Contemporary Arts, Girls &, Infants School, Perth Boys School, Perth Tech	
St Brigids Parish Hall (former)	2029	60	John Street	31.944664°S 115.853016°E	Northbridge		
St Brigid's Group, Perth	2030		John, Fitzgerald & Aberdeen Streets	31.944247°S 115.85275°E	Northbridge	Comprising Church, Parish Hall, Convent, Convent School, Presbytery	
The Terraces	2043	63	Mount Street	31.9553°S 115.846503°E	Perth	Lefroy House	
Moreton Bay Fig Tree, Royal Perth Hospital	2047		Murray Street	31.954802°S 115.864659°E	Perth		
Royal Perth Hospital Administration Building	2048	51	Victoria Square	31.954568°S 115.865169°E	Perth	Nurses Home (former)	
Royal Perth Hospital (Kirkman House)	2049	51	Victoria Square	31.954581°S 115.864728°E	Perth	& Moreton Bay Fig Tree	
Perth Chest Clinic	2050	15–17	Murray Street	31.95508°S 115.864674°E	Perth	Hibernian Hall, Cathedral Hall	
No 1 Fire Station (former)	2051	25	Murray Street	31.9548°S 115.864°E	Perth	Central Fire Station, Perth City Fire Station, Western Australian Fire Brigade Museum	
Young Australia League and House	2052	45 & 55	Murray Street	31.95477°S 115.863788°E	Perth	YAL and residence	
Chief Secretary/Public Health Department (former)	2053	57	Murray Street	31.954723°S 115.863465°E	Perth	Perth Medical and Health Department, Colonial, Chief Inspector of Factories and Early Closin	
Perth Government Stores (former)	2056	70–74	Murray Street	31.954056°S 115.863622°E	Perth	Murray House, Department of Mines	
Queens Buildings	2058	97–107	William Street	31.952523°S 115.857028°E	Perth		
Commonwealth Bank Building	2064	242	Murray Street	31.952583°S 115.858683°E	Perth		
Piccadilly Theatre and Arcade	2065	700–704	Hay Street	31.953352°S 115.858261°E	Perth		
Methodist Mission (former)	2066	97	William Street	31.952523°S 115.857028°E	Perth		
Wentworth Plaza Hotel	2067	300	Murray Street	31.952101°S 115.857264°E	Perth	Part of Raine Square complex, Commercial Building	
No.2 Substation, Murray Street	2072	325	Murray Street	31.952042°S 115.855598°E	Perth	Electric Light Substation, State Electricity Commission Sub Station	
Hostel Milligan, Perth	2078	453	Murray Street	31.950771°S 115.851839°E	Perth	Milligan Hostel, Pearl Villa	
1 Museum Street	2081	1	Museum Street, 25 Aberdeen Street	31.948179°S 115.861517°E	Northbridge	Two Houses, 27 & 29 Museum Street	
Salvation Army Headquarters & Congress Hall (former)	2084	48–54	Pier Streetreet & 69 Murray Street	31.954666°S 115.862779°E	Perth	Salvation Army Citadel, Salvation Army Peoples Palace	
Lieut. General Sir J.J. Talbot Hobbs Memorial	2089		Riverside Drive	31.957847°S 115.858892°E	Perth	Sir Talbot Hobbs Statue	
West Australian Rowing Club	2090		Riverside Drive	31.959584°S 115.859772°E	Perth		
Lawson Flats	2092		Sherwood Crescent	31.956464°S 115.858288°E	Perth		
Bishop's House	2093	235	St Georges Terrace	31.954569°S 115.851208°E	Perth	Bishop's See	
St George's House	2094	235–237	St Georges Terrace	31.953307°S 115.851266°E	Perth	The Terrace Hotel, Cardigan House, Bishops Grove, Ingle Hall	
Government House and Grounds	2095	13	St Georges Terrace	31.957808°S 115.862221°E	Perth	The Domain, Government House including gardens	
Government House Ballroom	2096	13	St Georges Terrace	31.957331°S 115.861744°E	Perth		
Council House, Perth	2097	27–29	St Georges Terrace	31.957002°S 115.860647°E	Perth		
St Andrew's Church	2099	36	St Georges Terrace	31.956134°S 115.862111°E	Perth	St Andrew's Presbyterian Church, St Andrew's Uniting Church	
The Deanery	2100	Corner	St Georges Terrace & Pier Street	31.9561°S 115.862°E	Perth		
Burt Memorial Hall	2101	38A	St Georges Terrace	31.956064°S 115.861331°E	Perth		
St George's Cathedral	2102	Corner	St Georges Terrace & Cathedral Avenue	31.9557°S 115.861°E	Perth	Port Jackson Fig Tree	
Alexander Forrest Statue	2103	Corner	St Georges Terrace & Barrack Street	31.955947°S 115.859792°E	Perth		
Trinity Uniting Church Group	2105	671–681	Hay Street Mall	31.9549°S 115.858°E	Perth		
Western Australian Club	2110	101–103	St Georges Terrace	31.955268°S 115.856979°E	Perth	English, Scottish & Australian Bank, Rural & Industrial Bank, Australian Provident Mutual Society, Royal Bank of Australia	
Newspaper House	2111	123–125	St Georges Terrace	31.954581°S 115.855434°E	Perth		
Newspaper House Group	2112	125	St Georges Terrace	31.95466°S 115.855278°E	Perth		
W.A. Trustee Co & Royal Insurance Co Building	2113	131–135	St Georges Terrace	31.954536°S 115.855166°E	Perth	WA Trust Executor & Agency Company Ltd	
Palace Hotel (former)	2114	108	St Georges Terrace	31.955°S 115.857°E	Perth	Bankwest	
Perth Technical College	2116	137	St Georges Terrace	31.95441°S 115.85483°E	Perth		
Old Perth Boys School and Perth Technical College	2117	125–139	St Georges Terrace	31.954337°S 115.854566°E	Perth	Old Perth Boys School	
The Cloisters	2119	200	St Georges Terrace	31.953345°S 115.853135°E	Perth	Perth Church of England Collegiate School	
Barracks Arch	2120	Junction	St Georges Terrace, Malcolm & Elder Streets	31.9522°S 115.849°E	Perth		
Victoria Square Cottages	2121	23–29	Victoria Square	31.955311°S 115.865423°E	Perth	Welfare Bur, Social Apostolate, Catholic Missions/Immigration Centre, Family	
St Mary's Roman Catholic Cathedral	2124	41	Victoria Square	31.955368°S 115.866437°E	Perth	Cathedral of the Immaculate Conception	
Archbishop's Palace	2126	17	Victoria Square	31.956005°S 115.86563°E	Perth	Catholic Church Office, Roman Catholic Presbytery	
St John's Pro-Cathedral	2130	18	Victoria Avenue	31.956291°S 115.866199°E	Perth		
Perth Dental Hospital Main Block	2131	189	Wellington Street	31.954751°S 115.868066°E	Perth	Perth Dental School, WA College of Dental Science, UWA	
St John's Ambulance Building	2132	298–300	Wellington Street	31.952863°S 115.86418°E	Perth	Perth City YHA, Perth City Youth Hostel Association	
Perth Railway Precinct	2133		Wellington Street	31.951284°S 115.859897°E	Perth	Perth Train Station, Perth Railway Station	
Wellington Buildings	2140	150–160	William Street	31.951547°S 115.858187°E	Perth	Higham's Buildings	
Wesfarmers Building (former)	2143	569	Wellington Street	31.950992°S 115.856237°E	Perth	Wills Building Apartments, Westralian Farmers Building (former)	
Railways Institute Building (former)	2146	605	Wellington Street	31.950478°S 115.855046°E	Perth	Chief Mechanical Engineering WAGR Building (former)	
Royal Hotel	2148	300	Murray Street	31.9513°S 115.8579°E	Perth	Wentworth Plaza/Raine Square/Royal Hotel, Complex	
Maclaren's Chambers ^{†}	2151	144–148	William Street	^{[?]}	Perth	Demolished in 2004	
Horseshoe Bridge	2153		William Street	31.950688°S 115.85892°E	Perth		
Brass Monkey	2154	209	William Street	31.94879°S 115.859174°E	Northbridge	Great Western Hotel (former)	
Rechabite Hall	2155	224	William Street	31.948658°S 115.859864°E	Perth	Commonwealth Trading Bank Store, Independent Order of Rechabites Hall (former)	
The New Church (former)	2158	176	Adelaide Terrace	31.959088°S 115.870857°E	East Perth	Indonesian Mission Baptist Church	
Perth Girls' Orphanage (former)	2159	108	Adelaide Terrace	31.960161°S 115.874013°E	East Perth	Heritage Council of Western Australia, Fisheries & Wildlife Department	
Carlton Hotel	2161	248–260	Hay Street	31.957912°S 115.871213°E	East Perth		
East Perth Cemeteries	2164	2	Bronte Street	31.95582°S 115.878656°E	East Perth	East Perth Cemeteries, East Perth Cemetery & St Bartholomew's Church	
The Perth Mint	2166	310	Hay Street	31.957128°S 115.869252°E	Perth		
Gloucester Park	2170	569	Nelson Crescent	31.957187°S 115.881665°E	East Perth	Perth Trotting Course, Brennan Park	
Peter Pan Statue, Queen's Gardens	2172	70	Hay Street	31.9591°S 115.876817°E	East Perth		
Perth Girls School (former)	2173	2	Wellington Street	31.956284°S 115.875897°E	East Perth	Police Traffic Department, Police Traffic Branch	
East Perth Primary School (former)	2174	76	Wittenoom St	31.952843°S 115.873542°E	East Perth	Jack Davis House – Infant School (former)	
Governor Kennedy Fountain & Plane Trees west of Fountain	2185		Mounts Bay Road, Kings Park	31.963439°S 115.84176°E	West Perth		
Old Swan Brewery Precinct	2186		Mounts Bay Road	31.96507°S 115.84074°E	Kings Park		
Edith Dircksey Cowan Memorial	2232		Kings Park Road	31.954051°S 115.844368°E	West Perth	Edith Cowan Memorial Clock	
Meerilinga	2236	1186	Hay Street	31.948662°S 115.843459°E	West Perth	Merrilinga	
Parliament House & Grounds	2239		Harvest Terrace & Malcolm St	31.9516°S 115.847°E	West Perth		
Old Observatory	2240	4	Havelock Street	31.95245°S 115.84451°E	West Perth		
Hale School (former)	2242	45	Parliament Place	31.951747°S 115.845080°E	West Perth	Constitutional Centre, The High School	
Shenton House	2457		University of Western Australia, Hackett Drive	Crawley	31.981249°S 115.819816°E	Crawley House	
Nurses Memorial Centre	2665	34	Kings Park Road	31.951886°S 115.838686°E	West Perth	Kathleen Reidy House	
Three Cottages	2695	62, 64 & 66	Aberdeen Street	31.946743°S 115.860035°E	Northbridge		
Commercial Bank (former)	2701	246	William Street	^{[?]}	Perth		
House	2871	178	Aberdeen Street	31.944204°S 115.854454°E	Northbridge		
Lexbourne House (former)	2905	18	Colin Street	31.951779°S 115.841511°E	West Perth	Lawton Hostel, Government Central School of Nursing	
Western Australian Police Service Complex	3048	2	Adelaide Terrace	31.961187°S 115.878852°E	East Perth		
Hills' Residence (former)	3235	300	Hay Street	31.957443°S 115.869843°E	East Perth	Stanmore House	
Savoy Hotel	3264		Hay Street Mall	31.95416°S 115.85955°E	Perth	Gresham Hotel	
Fitzgerald Hotel (former)	3294	64	Fitzgerald Street	31.944854°S 115.853472°E	Northbridge	Clarendon Hotel	
Low Level Sewage Pumping Stations No.s 1 & 2, Perth	3298		Causeway & Langley Park	31.962178°S 115.876289°E 31.960468°S 115.867139°E	Perth		
Aston Clinic Stables	3299	19A	Mayfair Street	31.947669°S 115.841505°E	West Perth	Aston Hospital (former), Malia House Stables	
Langley Park	3346		Riverside Drive	31.961389°S 115.868889°E	Perth	Reserve 12510	
Government Printing Office (former)	3470	78	Murray Street	31.954109°S 115.863198°E	Perth	Telecom Museum (former)	
The Rural & Industries Bank of Western Australia (Site of) ^{†}	3484	28	Barrack Street	31.9551°S 115.8605°E	Perth	R & I Bank, Foundation Park, Demolished in 1996	
Houses (former), 257 & 259 Adelaide Terrace	3494	257 & 259	Adelaide Terrace	31.958106°S 115.865706°E	Perth	Kincora, Sydenham, Lyminge, Johnson House (previously HCWA No. 1946)	
Boans Furniture Factory (former)	3515	Corner	Saunders & Glyde Streets	31.951358°S 115.874874°E	East Perth		
Hackett Memorial Buildings (University of Western Australia, UWA)	3519		off Mounts Bay Road	Crawley	31.976919°S 115.817992°E	Consists of the Administration Building (1930), Hackett Hall (1931), Winthrop Hall (including the Tower and Great Gateway - 1932), enclosing Whitfeld Court, and the Sunken Gardens	
Park Avenue Building, University of Western Australia	3545	Corner	Park & Crawley Avenues	31.973183°S 115.822666°E	Crawley	Zoology Building, UWA, Biology and Geology Building	
Co-operative Bulk Handling Building (former), West Perth	3550	22	Delhi Street	31.945428°S 115.84493°E	West Perth	CBH Building, AFG Building	
Causeway Bridges	3631		Over Swan River	31.965409°S 115.884262°E	East Perth	Nos 914 & 932	
William Street Precinct	3795	178–282	William Street	31.949552°S 115.859318°E	Northbridge	William Street Precinct (east side)	
Royal King's Park Tennis Club	3801		Kings Park Road	31.954581°S 115.839777°E	West Perth		
Gloucester Park Boundary Walls ^{†}	3840		Waterloo Crescent & Nile Street	^{[?]}	East Perth	Demolished in 1998	
151–165 Beaufort Street	3845	151–165	Beaufort Street	31.947671°S 115.86353°E	Perth	Five shops & residence	
Edith Cowan's House & Skinner Gallery (former)	3847	31	Malcolm Street	31.953188°S 115.847641°E	West Perth	House & gallery	
Dumas House	3849	2	Havelock Street	31.953148°S 115.84359°E	West Perth	Government office building, public offices building	
Esplanade Reserve	3850	5	The Esplanade	31.957337°S 115.857155°E	Perth	Including Allan Green Conservatory, Alf Curlewis Gardens & Florence Hummerston Day Care Centre (former)	
Two Attached Houses & Separate House	3854	7	Newcastle Street	31.946095°S 115.860114°E	Northbridge	Ada Villa, Alfred Villa & Arthur Villa	
Harvest House, West Perth	3925	7	Harvest Terrace	31.950797°S 115.846512°E	West Perth		
Braddocks Dispensary	3968	180	Aberdeen Street	31.944250°S 115.854316°E	Northbridge	Antique dealer	
Barrack Square	4031		Barrack Square	31.959708°S 115.857834°E	Perth	Union Jack Square, Flagstaff Square, Harper Square	
Harold Boas Gardens	4241	bounded by	Wellington, Colin & Delhi Streets	31.946609°S 115.844804°E	West Perth	Delhi Square	
Treasury Building (former)	4275	28	Barrack Street	31.9559°S 115.86057°E	Perth	Department of Land Admin Offices – DOLA	
Royal Perth Hospital Heritage Precinct	4289	51	Victoria Square	31.95463°S 115.865219°E	Perth	Royal Perth Hospital Group, Perth Public Hospital	
Stable Block (former) – Swan Brewery Complex	4310		Mounts Bay Road	^{[?]}	Perth		
Tower House, Northbridge	4317	115	Francis Street	31.946607°S 115.856243°E	Northbridge	The Rectory	
House, 33 Wellington Street	4331	33	Wellington Street	31.956915°S 115.874523°E	East Perth		
Residence, 52 Mount Street	4342	52	Mount Street	31.954175°S 115.846726°E	West Perth	Lee-Steere House, Mount Private Hotel, Archbishop's Residence, Darlot Residence	
Olive Tree	4379		St Georges Terrace, Government House Gardens	31.957811°S 115.862219°E	Perth		
Port Jackson Fig, Mt Newman House	4380	202	St Georges Terrace	31.953447°S 115.853348°E	Perth	Cloisters Tree	
St Mary's Cathedral Grounds	4498		Victoria Square	31.955264°S 115.866060°E	Perth		
Outram Street Terraces	4506	74–82	Outram Street	31.947059°S 115.840713°E	West Perth	Janey's Supper House Cafe, Office, Restaurant, Kent Villa, Heimath, Echuca, Wainera	
Reveley's Mill Site (former)	4526	133	St Georges Terrace	^{[?]}	Perth		
Graham Flats	4559	1217	Hay Street	31.948848°S 115.841397°E	West Perth		
Perth Concert Hall	4571	5	St Georges Terrace	31.958152°S 115.863749°E	Perth		
Queens Gardens	4572		Hay Street	31.960°S 115.877°E	East Perth	East Perth Park, includes Peter Pan Statue, East Perth Clayfields Reserve	
P & O Building (former)	4587	56–58	William Street	31.95387°S 115.85706°E	Perth	Orient Line Building, MAS Building, Malaysian Airlines	
Aberdeen Hotel & St Johns Building	4601	84	Aberdeen Street	31.94645°S 115.859364°E	Northbridge	Union Hotel, Cosmopolitan Hotel, The Red Lion, Hotel, Deen Hotel	
No 6 Electricity Sub Station (former)	4633	Corner	Brown & Glyde Streets	31.951172°S 115.875322°E	East Perth	No 6 Electricity & Gas Sub Station	
Cathedral of St Constantine & St Helene	4641	18	Parker Street	31.946175°S 115.856484°E	Northbridge	Greek Orthodox Church	
Houses at 51–53 Goderich Street	4652	51 & 53	Goderich Street	31.957794°S 115.873425°E	East Perth		
Roe Street Cottage	5111	2	Roe Street	31.949342°S 115.861636°E	Perth		
ANZ Bank (former)	6101	938–940	Hay Street	31.951644°S 115.851898°E	Perth	English, Scottish & Australian Bank, R N Smyth	
Site of Buildings, Burt Way ^{†}	6102	3–8	Burt Way & 96–98 & 102–104 Terrace Road	31.960063°S 115.868478°E	East Perth	Includes Cypress Pine trees, demolished in 2002	
Delaney Gallery	8783	74	Beaufort Street	31.94978°S 115.86272°E	Perth	Trades Hall	
Raine Square	9824	bounded by	Wellington, William, Queen & Murray Streets	31.9515°S 115.8571°E	Perth	Hob Nob Building, Glyde Chambers	
Chemistry Centre (former), East Perth	10612	100	Plain Street	31.960006°S 115.875614°E	East Perth		
Two Houses (former)	11488	156–158	Aberdeen Street	31.944783°S 115.855789°E	Northbridge	Perth Travellers' lodge, Backpackers Hostel	
Bank of New South Wales (NSW) (former)	11492	198–206	William Street	31.949338°S 115.859453°E	Perth	Hare Krishna Restaurant	
Taylor's Buildings	11506	236–242	William Street	31.948422°S 115.860014°E	Perth		
Aberdeen Street Precinct	11509	154–188	Aberdeen Street	31.944567°S 115.855202°E	Northbridge		
S Chester Building	11575	176–178	William Street	31.949793°S 115.859095°E	Perth		
Perth Hostel	11588	194	William Street	31.949495°S 115.859354°E	Perth		
First Church of Christ, Scientist, Perth	11595	264	St Georges Terrace	31.9519°S 115.8492°E	Perth		
House	12021	176	Aberdeen Street	31.94425°S 115.854548°E	Northbridge		
Romany Restaurant	12118	186–192	William Street	31.949643°S 115.85926°E	Perth		
House	13015	184	Aberdeen Street	31.944126°S 115.854264°E	Northbridge		
House	13017	166	Aberdeen Street	31.94448°S 115.855049°E	Northbridge		
House	13024	162	Aberdeen Street	31.944658°S 115.855401°E	Northbridge	Watson Lodge, Health Centre	
International Order of Good Templars War Memorial, Supreme Court Gardens	13057		Barrack Street	31.958187°S 115.860158°E	Perth	Good Templars temperance group	
Soldier's Chapel, St George's Cathedral	13758		Cathedral Avenue	31.9557°S 115.861°E	Perth		
Residence & Shop, Northbridge	14066	186–188	Aberdeen Street	31.944104°S 115.854155°E	Northbridge	Cafe	
Bank of New South Wales (NSW) (former)	14763	206	William Street	^{[?]}	Northbridge		
National Bank (former)	14764	214	William Street	31.948884°S 115.859721°E	Northbridge	Perth Job Club	
Globe Hotel	14888	495–497	Wellington Street	31.951756°S 115.85849°E	Perth		
Three Attached Houses	14892	21	Palmerston Street	31.94439°S 115.856287°E	Northbridge		
ABC Sound Broadcasting and Television Studios, Perth	14911	187–193	Adelaide Terrace	31.960046°S 115.869575°E	East Perth	Rosehill Studios, Rose Hill Studios	
Shops & Offices	15026	377	Newcastle Street	31.943182°S 115.8539°E	Northbridge	Chinese herbalist	
Commercial Building & Attached Residence	15226	309	Newcastle Street	31.944243°S 115.856325°E	Northbridge	House (former), shop, "Wallpaper World"	
House	15724	55	Murray Street	31.954814°S 115.863641°E	Perth		
House	15752	174	Aberdeen Street	31.944258°S 115.854661°E	Northbridge		
House	15753	170	Aberdeen Street	31.944369°S 115.854839°E	Northbridge		
House	15754	172	Aberdeen Street	31.944345°S 115.85473°E	Northbridge		
Tom Burke House	15783	153	Newcastle Street	31.946733°S 115.861431°E	Perth	Hostel, Homeswest Lodging House	
Solidarity Park	15850	Corner	Parliament Pl & Harvest Terrace	31.9516°S 115.846°E	West Perth	The Workers' Embassy	
Commercial Building	16433	96–100	William Street	^{[?]}	Perth	KFC, Domino's Pizza & Hungry Jacks, Fast Food in One	
Noarlinga Chambers	16436	208–212	William Street	31.948979°S 115.85958°E	Northbridge		
Rosen Buildings	16437	218–220	William Street	31.948785°S 115.859784°E	Perth		
Shops	16438	270–272	William Street	31.947603°S 115.860498°E	Northbridge		
Express Travel Kim Kim Asian	16440	276	William Street	31.947515°S 115.860522°E	Perth	Shop	
Shop	16441	278–282	William Street	31.947449°S 115.86061°E	Northbridge		
Dick Smith Electronics Building & Co	16479	119	William Street	^{[?]}	Perth		
Display Centre & Wing Loong New & Used Books	16483	266–268	William Street	31.947677°S 115.860451°E	Northbridge		
Barkers Building ^{†}	16548	124–130	William Street	^{[?]}	Perth	Demolished in 2004	
Art Gallery of Western Australia Complex	16722	4	Roe Street	31.9507°S 115.8611°E	Perth	Main Gallery Building (portion of the place)	
William & Wellington Street Precinct	16743		William & Wellington Streets	31.952099°S 115.857786°E	Perth	Perth Urban Rail Development Area	
Colonial Hospital, Victoria Square	17605			^{[?]}	Perth		
Sewerage Vent, West Perth	23738		Arthur Street	31.944064°S 115.842738°E	West Perth		
Sewerage Vent, East Perth	23762		Royal Street	31.952366°S 115.873049°E	East Perth		
Sewerage Vent, Princess Margaret Hospital, West Perth	23782		Cook Street	31.94693°S 115.838116°E	West Perth		
Metropolitan Sewerage Vents	23992			31.944064°S 115.842738°E 31.952366°S 115.873049°E 31.94693°S 115.838116°E	East & West Perth, Highgate, Northbridge		
Main Roads Building (Don Aitken Centre), East Perth	26494	132	Plain Street	31.9570°S 115.8771°E	East Perth		
Marginata Flats, Perth	26940	165	Wellington Street	31.956031°S 115.868962°E	Perth		
Circa 1905 Building	26950	242	William Street	31.948265°S 115.859977°E	Perth	Ruck Rover	
Circa 1925 Building	26992	230	William Street	31.948542°S 115.859933°E	Perth		
House 258 William Street	27023	258	William Street	31.947821°S 115.860334°E	Perth	Hummus Club, R&I Bank	
Stirling Gardens	27076	33	St Georges Terrace	31.956525°S 115.859942°E	Perth	Part of Supreme Court Buildings and Gardens, Old Court House, Stirling Gardens (1947)	

== Former places ==
The following place has been removed from the State Register of Heritage Places within the City of Perth:

Place name	Place #	Street number	Street name	Co-ordinates	Suburb or town	Delisted	Notes & former names	Photo
Central Government Offices & Town Hall Precinct	3480	28	Barrack Street	31.95533°S 115.860446°E	Perth	1 July 2021		
Flats 72-74 Thomas Street	15761	72-74	Thomas Street	31.948629°S 115.836183°E	West Perth	1 July 2021		

=== Notes ===
- ^[?]No coordinates specified by Inherit database
- ^{†} Denotes building has been demolished
