= Railway hotel =

Railway hotel may refer to:

- A railway hotel, a hotel built near a railway station
- Railway Hotel, Edgware, a former pub and hotel in Edgware, London
- Railway Hotel, Gympie, a hotel in Gympie, Australia
- Railway Hotel, Kirkham, Lancashire, England
- Railway Hotel, Parkerville, Australia, a heritage pub now trading as the Parkerville Tavern
- Railway Hotel, Perth, a former hotel in Perth, Australia
- Railway Hotel, Port Adelaide, a hotel in Port Adelaide, Australia
- Railway Hotel, Ravenswood, a hotel in Ravenswood, Australia
- The Railway Hotel, Hua Hin, a hotel in Hua Hin, Thailand
- The Railway Hotel, Southend-on-Sea, a pub in Essex, England
- "Railway Hotel", a 1977 song by Mike Batt
