= Anna Parkina =

Russian artist (born 1979)

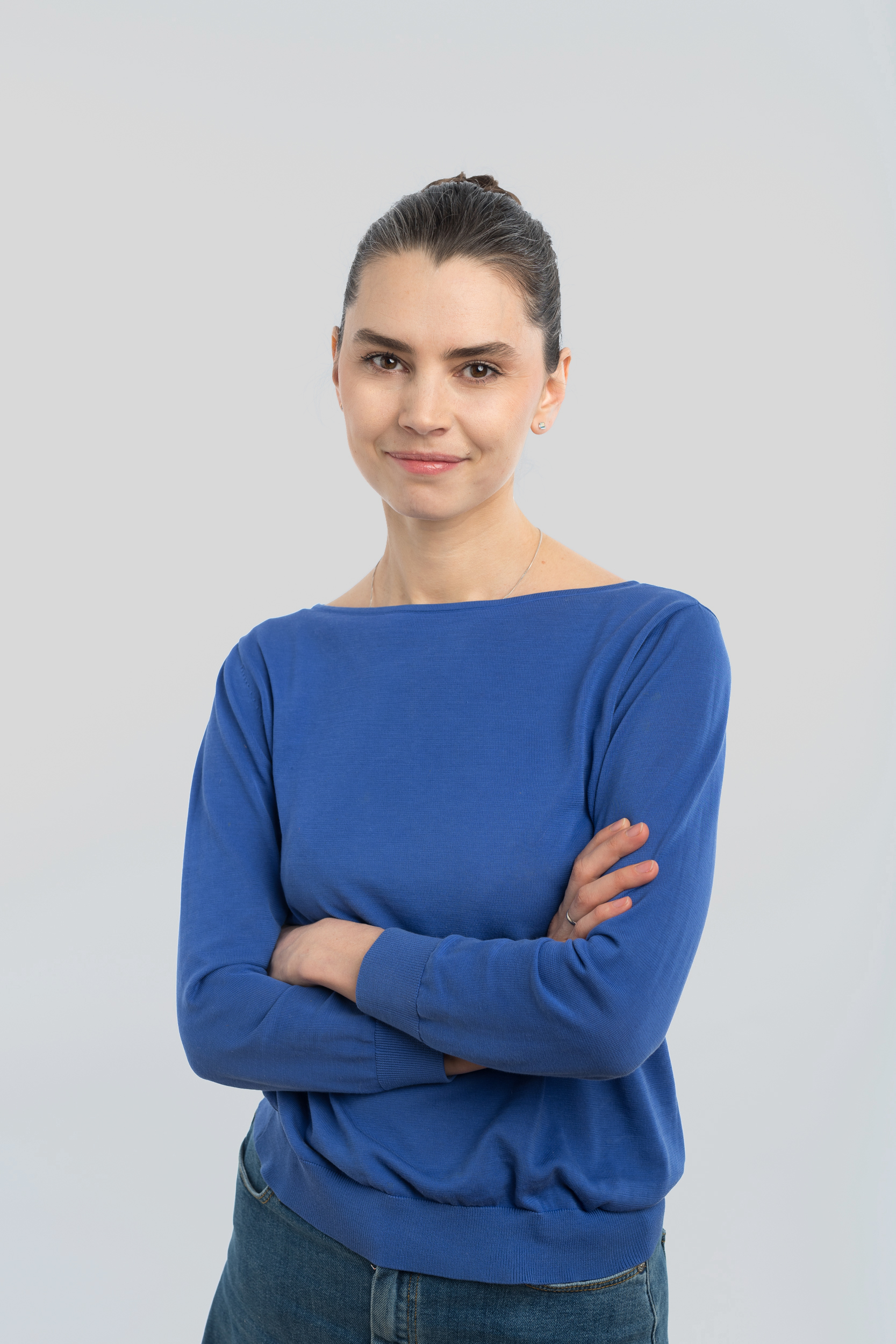
- Born: 1979 (age 46–47); Moscow, Russian SFSR, Soviet Union
- Education: University of Paris VIII; École nationale supérieure des Beaux-Arts

Anna Parkina (Russian: Анна Паркина; born 1979) is a Russian artist who lives and works in Moscow. She uses collage as her key artistic method but also works in a variety of media, including performance, sculpture and video.

== Education ==
Parkina graduated from the University of Paris VIII in 2002 and was an intern at the Art Center College of Design in Pasadena, California, in 2005, where she worked with American artist Mike Kelley and musician Mayo Thompson. Parkina graduated from the Ecole des Beaux-Arts, Paris, in 2006.

== Career ==
Between 2003 and 2006 Parkina maintained an apartment-based gallery in Paris where she ran one-day shows, conferences, and performances. In 2004 she founded Tramway Editions that specializes in publishing experimental journals and books by artists. In 2005 Parkina had one of her first solo shows in Germany at Galerie Meerrettich in Berlin that went by the title Zapovednik, on which she also launched a book of the same name.

In 2008 Parkina took part in the show Apples Fall Simultaneously In Different Gardens, curated by Anna Kuznetsova, which became part of 1st Moscow Young Art Biennale. In 2009 Parkina was featured on the main project of the 53rd Venice Biennale Making Worlds, curated by Daniel Birnbaum. That year she opened her first solo show in Moscow, Silent Corner of Field, at GMG gallery. In 2010 she participated in the show Modernikon: Contemporary Art from Russia, hosted by Fondazione Sandretto Re Rebaudengo in Turin and curated by Francesco Bonami and Irene Calderoni. In 2011 San Francisco Museum of Modern Art ran her solo show Fallow Land, curated by John Zarobell, as part of a programme to display promising young artists. Among other participants of the programme were Luke Twyman, Doris Salcedo, and Rachel Harrison. In 2013 Parkina took part in the show Space of Exception, part of the 5th Moscow Biennale, curated by Elena Sorokina and Jelle Bouwhuis. In 2014 Parkina had her second solo show in Moscow, Eyes Instead of The Eye, at the Regina Gallery, where she displayed sculptures and assemblages along with works on paper. In 2014 she was featured on the show entitled Detective in the Moscow Museum of Contemporary Art, curated by Valentin Dyakonov. Parkina was represented on the inaugural Triennial of Russian Contemporary Art, organized by Garage Museum of Contemporary Art. She collaborates on a regular basis with Regina Gallery, Wilkinson Gallery in London and Leonhard Ruethmueller — Contemporary Art in Basel

== Critical reaction ==
Parkina works in a variety of media, including performance, sculpture, paper and video works. She uses collage as her key artistic method. Her works contain multiple references to Soviet constructivism, American noir movies of the 40s and 50s, and pop art, especially collages by Richard Hamilton. American curator John Zarobell considers her pieces of political character but not motivated by politics; he believes they successfully combine Kazimir Malevich’s idealism with technical characteristics of constructivism, but lack in didacticism at the same time. Curator and critic Valentin Dyakonov interprets her practice as a reaction to the post-ideological Russian environment of 1990s and 2000s and compares her works to collages by German post-war artist Kurt Schwitters. According to Dyakonov, Parkina creates a situation of alogical and rhythmical layering of images, which corresponds with a faceted vision of the contemporary world. Critic Dominic Eichler compared her practice to Frances Stark’s drawings and drew parallels between Parkina's selection of zines from recent years with the aesthetics of Tracey Emin, Jonathan Meese, Nicole Eisenman, Raymond Pettibon and Elke Silvia Krystufek. According to Eichler, Parkina explores through her work the opportunities that conceptual art faces when combined with narrative and imagery. In her 2013 work, Valentin Dyakonov saw references to early cubism with its deconstruction of image, and a shift from object to abstract and back to object, which froze in a form of surrealistic images, evoking the memory of works by Louise Bourgeois and Max Ernst. According to art historian Yana Yukhalova, these works criticized the media environment of being overloaded with imagery, which was exposed by Parkina in her study of the nature of human vision and its fragmentary character in particular.

== Exhibitions ==
=== Personal shows ===
2014 — Eyes Instead of The Eye, Regina Gallery, Moscow

2013 — Only a Sleeping Person Doesn't Blink, Wilkinson Gallery, London

2012 — Sacred Ambush is Full of Parrots Screaming, in collaboration with Andrew Gilbert, Svit Gallery, Prague, Czech Republic

2011 — For a Black Day, Ribordy Contemporary, Geneva

2011 — Fallow Land, San Francisco Museum of Modern Art

2010 — Egg in the Fist, Wilkinson Gallery, London

2010 — The Ticket is for Today, Focal Point Gallery, Southend-on-Sea, United Kingdom

2010 — Nests, Gladstone Gallery, New York

2009 — Open Space, Art Cologne, Cologne, Germany

2009 — Silent Corner of Field, GMG gallery, Moscow, Russia

2008 — White Time, COMA, Berlin, Germany

2008 — Winners and Witness, Wilkinson Gallery, London

2008 — Winners and Witness, Autocenter, Berlin

2007 — Pocket Chrystal, Kjubh, Cologne, Germany

2006 — Corn Rush the movie II — Dark Room, Haswellediger & Co. Gallery, New York City

2005 — Zapovednik, Galerie Meerrettich, Berlin

2004 — Hier geht's raus, Golden Pudel, Hamburg, Germany

=== Group shows ===
2016 — Tutti Frutti, Regina Gallery, Moscow

2015 — Hooray! Sculpture!, Moscow Contemporary Art Center Winzavod, Moscow

2014 — Detective, Moscow Museum of Contemporary Art, Moscow

2013 — Space of Exception, Special project of the 5th Moscow Biennale, Artplay, Moscow

2013 — First International Online Biennale, online project

2013 — Perspectives on Collage, The Photographers' Gallery, London

2013 — Hort Family Collection, annual private collection show, New York City

2013 — 2Q13: Women Collectors, Women Artists, Lloyds Club, London

2012 — Gaiety is the Most Outstanding Feature of the Soviet Union, Saatchi Gallery, London

2012 — Reload, Red October Gallery, Moscow

2012 — Things, Words, and Consequences, Moscow Museum of Contemporary Art, Moscow

2012 — The Triumph of Kaissa, Dedication to Marcel Duchamp, Tretyakov Gallery on Krymsky Val, Moscow

2011 — Outrageous Fortune Tarot Deck, Focal Point Gallery, Southend-on-Sea, England

2011 — Modernikon: Contemporary Art from Russia, Casa dei Tre Oci, Venice, Italy

2011 — Painted Over/Under part 2, LACE, Los Angeles

2011 — East Ex East, Brand New Gallery, Milan, Italy

2010 — Modernikon: Contemporary Art from Russia, Fondazione Sandretto Re Rebaudengo, Turin, Italy

2010 — East Bound, KAI 10 Raum Für Kunst, Düsseldorf, Germany

2009 — Really?, Parallel programme of the 3rd Moscow Biennale, Artplay

2009 — Making Worlds, Main programme of the 53rd Venice Biennale

2009 — Sound, online project, whyandwherefore.com

2009 — No Capry for an Old Man, Venice Beach, Los Angeles

2009 — The Show Must Go On, GMG Gallery, Moscow

2009 — Do Not Lean, Ru.Litvin Gallery, Moscow

2008 — Madonna, Christian Nagel Gallery, Berlin

2008 — Apples Fall Simultaneously In Different Gardens, as part of the 1st Moscow International Young Art Biennale, Winzavod, Moscow

2008 — The End Was Yesterday, Kunstzeitraum, Innsbruck, Austria

2008 — Collage, Forever a Day Buro, Berlin

2008 — Freedom of Choice, National Center of Contemporary History of Russia, Moscow

2008 — The End Was Yesterday, Autocenter and Galerie Im Regierungsviertel, Berlin

2008 — The Object is the Mirror: part II, Wilkinson Gallery, London

2008 — Cut, Thierry Goldberg Project, New York City

2007 — Dracularising, NeueAlteBrucke, Frankfurt

2007 — Hello, I am crashing, Salon 94, New York City

2007 — Group project with Joep van Liefland, Galerie 127, New York City

2007 — Bellevue, Galerie Eva Winkeler, Frankfurt

2006 — Mental Odyssey, COMA, Berlin

2006 — Group project with Andrew Gilbert, Bianca Schoenig and Anne Tismer, Ballhaus Ost, Berlin

2006 — Summer Show, Daniel Hug Galerie, Los Angeles

2006 — A room with...., Michael Janissen Galerie, Cologne, Germany

2006 — Corn Rush the movie-I, California State University, Long Beach, Los Angeles

2005 — 1/x, ENSBA, Paris

2005 — Sammlung Taubenstrasse, Kunsthaus, Hamburg, Germany

2005 — En : Ton ! Die ! Sjans!?, Galerie XX Multiples, Rotterdam, Netherlands

2004 — La Maison Piégé, Apartment-based gallery, Paris

2002 — Collective 10, Galerie L., Paris

=== Performances ===
2015 — The Dream of the Volunteer, Whitechapel Gallery, London

2011 — Fallow Land, San Francisco Museum of Modern Art, San Francisco,

2010 — Concrete book, Fondazione Sandretto Re Rebaudengo, Turin, Italy

2010 — Biryulevo, supported by Focal Point Gallery, the Railway Hotel, Southend-on-Sea

2008 — Terminal.Suspension.Expansion, Wilkinson Gallery, London

2008 — Aelita, Her Memory of a Planet Monogo, University Settlement Society of New York

2007 — Online Empire, Daniel Hug Gallery, Los Angeles

2007 — Beyond the Green Door, Galerie Neue Alte Brücke, Frankfurt, Germany

2006 — Corn Rush the movie II-Dark Room, Haswellediger & Co Gallery, New York City

2006 — Corn Rush the movie I, California State University, Long Beach, Los Angeles

2006 — Join us (with Barry Johnston), Art Center College of Design, Pasadena, California

2006 — Breaking News, COMA, Berlin

2003 — Hardcore, Palais de Tokyo, Paris

=== Curatorial projects ===
2010 — Wherever they fell, Wilkinson Gallery, London

2006 — Daniel Buren conference by Hank Schmidt in der Beek, 6 rue Pihet, Paris

2005 — Show Time, with Barry Johnston, 6 rue Pihet, Paris

2004 — Baulieu Bellevue II, with Stef Heidues, Paris

2003 — L'effondrement de E-commerce, with Roberto Ohrt and Juli Susin, 6 rue Pihet, Paris

== Books ==
2010 — Biryulevo, artist book, 250 copies, Onestar Press, Paris

2010 — Четыре (The four), zine, 40 copies, Tramway Edition, Paris

2009 — In full bud, lithography, 50 copies, New Museum of Contemporary Art publishing, New York City

2008 — А ты гори звезда (Shine the Star, Shine), zine, 30 copies, Tramway Edition, Paris

2007 — Pocket Chrystal, zine, 50 copies, Tramway Edition, Paris

2006 — Corn Rush – The Movie, artist book, 49 copies, Tramway Edition, Paris

2005 — Phantomaster, zine, 40 copies Tramway Edition, Paris

2005 — Ochag (The Hearth), zine, 35 copies, Tramway Edition, Paris

2005 — Zapovednik, artist book, 43 copies, Tramway Edition, Paris

2004 — L’ére des congelés et des surgelés, zine, 100 copies, Tramway Edition, Paris

2004 — Appendix, zine, 100 copies, Tramway Edition and Silverbridge Edition, Paris

2003 — Never Alone, zine, 100 copies, Tramway Edition, Paris

2003 — Par ici la sortie, zine, 100 copies, Tramway Edition and Silverbridge Edition, Paris

2003 — Rabbit hunter / Rabbit saver, artist book, one copy, Tramway Edition, Paris

2003 — Patron Model, artist book, one copy, Tramway Edition, Paris

2003 — Les Aventures, artist book, one copy, Tramway Edition, Paris
