= Mary Raine =

Australian businesswoman and philanthropist (1877–1960)

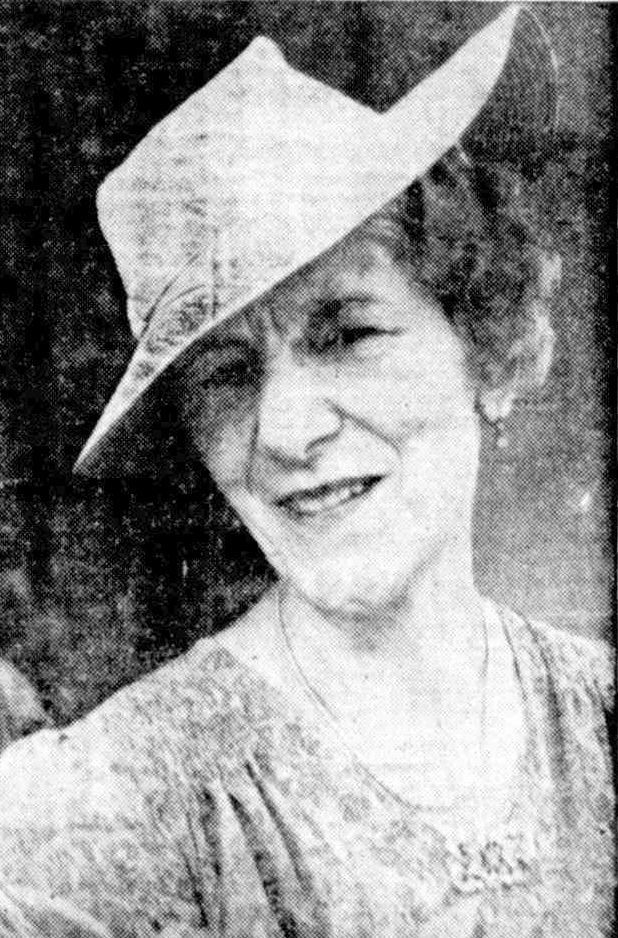
- Mary Raine in December 1943
- Born: Mary Carter; 17 February 1877; London, England
- Died: 3 February 1960 (aged 82); Perth, Western Australia
- Monuments: Raine Square, Western Australia
- Other names: Mary Thomas, Ma Thomas
- Occupations: Businesswoman, philanthropist
- Known for: Significant property owner in Perth, Western Australia; Establishment of the Raine Medical Research Foundation
- Spouses: William Morris Thomas (married 1905–18); Arnold Yeldham (Joe) Raine (married 1943–1957)

Mary Bertha Raine (née Carter, also known as Mary Thomas during her first marriage, 17 February 1877 – 3 February 1960) was an Australian businesswoman and philanthropist. Her bequests to the University of Western Australia created and funded the Raine Medical Research Foundation.

== Early life ==
Raine was born Mary Carter in London (Note: Sources differ on whether she was born in Lambeth or Putney.) on 17 February 1877 to Charles and Mary Carter. She was the oldest of thirteen children.

After finishing school at 14, she became a probationary teacher in London.

She took singing lessons, and at age 17 found work as a singer, including at Drury Lane and the Adelphi Theatre, which lasted until she lost her ability to sing after contracting typhoid fever. During this time she continued to work in one of her father's shops.

After she lost her singing voice, Carter worked at The Scotch House, a boys' and men's outfitter, doing clerical work and filling in for sales staff.

== Travel to Australia ==
By 1900, Britain was at war with the Boer republics, resulting in financial difficulty for London businesses, including The Scotch House and Charles Carter's. Prompted by a desire to improve her lot in life, and a comment from her father about his having to maintain his daughters "for the rest of my life", Mary booked a passage to Australia.

In 1900, at the age of 23, Carter sailed with her sister Daisy to Moreton Bay in Queensland, Australia, on Jumna, arriving on 20 November. On her arrival in Australia, she had £100, her life's savings. Both girls worked as barmaids in Brisbane. Mary also sang at the hotel, and was offered a role in a local theatrical production. However her voice failed her again after a week in the theatre. In 1901 the two sisters moved to Sydney.

Mary Carter was offered a job managing a hotel in Nyngan, (Note: Probably the present Nyngan Hotel on the corner of Dandaloo and Nymagee Streets.) but arrived there in 1902 to find that the hotel had "no guests, no customers, no stock" and no suppliers willing to deliver until outstanding bills were paid. With the help of another new employee, and using some of their own money, Carter bought alcohol by the bottle from a rival hotel, then sold it by the glass from their hotel, making a profit. They repeated the process, until the hotel became a self-sustaining business again. Two years after Carter took over management of the hotel the licensee left town as a result of police investigation into family cruelty. The hotel's owner, Resch's Limited, offered Carter the licence, but the liquor licensing laws of the time did not allow an unmarried woman to hold the licence.

Carter return to Sydney, where she met up with Daisy again, and they decided to return to England. The return voyage was to be via Fremantle, Western Australia. On the passage across the Great Australian Bight Daisy suffered from severe sea sickness, and on the advice of the ship's doctor they abandoned the voyage, disembarking at Fremantle in 1904. (Note: Both sisters had intended their stay to be temporary, until Daisy had recovered from her illness, but after finding work, both Carters settled into life in Perth. With the exception of occasional visits to England, they remained in Perth for the rest of their lives.)

== Perth, Western Australia ==
Carter again found work as a barmaid, at the Metropole Hotel on Hay Street, Perth, and then later at the Central Hotel on the corner of Forrest Place and Wellington Street. In both cases wages included accommodation, so she was able to save a significant portion of her income. With those savings, the £100 she had brought from England, and a loan for the remainder, she bought a house in Subiaco. She leased that property and used the rental income to pay the loan off within two years. (Note: According to Sangster the mortgage on the property was registered in July 1903 (and discharged in July 1905), but according to other references Carter did not arrive in Western Australia until 1904.) She then bought the vacant block adjacent to her first property, built a house on it and leased it out as well.

Carter maintained her interest in music, and sang as a soloist with the choir at Wesley Church.

On 5 May 1905, she married William Morris Thomas, becoming Mary Thomas. The couple moved to a farm in Harvey but struggled to make a living. Mary supplemented their farming income by running a small boarding house in nearby Mornington Mills. As well as the financial difficulties they faced, the Thomases' relationship was strained by William's increasing consumption of alcohol – a problem that had existed since their courtship – and in 1911 Mary returned to Perth, moving into a house that she had bought before the marriage. The couple did not divorce; William remained in Harvey, but stayed with her occasionally when he visited Perth. He died in 1918 after falling from a horse.

After returning to Perth in 1911 Mary Thomas took up work as a barmaid again, while continuing to buy and sell (always for a profit) property. In 1915 she bought her first business, the Bon Ton Cafe on William Street . The cafe did well, and Thomas soon bought a second one nearby, the Popular Cafe, and employed someone to manage it. She ran the Bon Ton Cafe for eight years, while simultaneously expanding her investment in real estate, including a row of houses in East Perth.

== Hotel industry ==
In 1924, Thomas established Metropolitan Properties Ltd, with a capital value of £100,000, to manage her real estate portfolio. That same year she bought the Gordons Hotel for £40,000, half of which she had borrowed, and obtained her first liquor licence. In 1927 she undertook a major refurbishment and expansion of the hotel at a cost of about £27,000, and in 1928 re-opened it as the Wentworth Hotel. The Wentworth became her home, headquarters and the flagship of her business empire.

She was often known to her customers as Ma Thomas.

Thomas continued to buy properties in the city, including the Bohemia, the United Services Hotel, the Royal Hotel, the Williams Building, Bon Marché Arcade and the Windsor Hotel (Note: The Windsor housed South Perth's first post office, and also ran the ferry service across the Swan River between Perth and the Mends Street Jetty.) in South Perth.

In 1940 Thomas took over the lease of the newly refurbished hotel in Bullsbrook, some 30 miles (48 km) (Note: by road) from Perth, and renamed it the Chequers Hotel. The business did well, having a virtual monopoly catering to the recently constructed, nearby RAAF Base Pearce, but the distance from Perth made direct supervision difficult, so she surrendered the lease after two years and restricted her hotel businesses to areas closer to the city.

In 1942, the fighting in World War II was getting closer to Australia, and large contingents of US servicemen began arriving in Perth, including those based in the then-secret Fremantle submarine base. Thomas was informed that the Wentworth Hotel was to be requisitioned by the United States Navy, and she had no choice but to cede control of most of the hotel's running to them. (Note: Other hotels were also similarly requisitioned.) This arrangement lasted until the end of the war in 1945. During the occupation by the US, there were regular fights between Australian and US servicemen, to the extent that in 1943 the Australian Army banned its soldiers from the Wentworth. The ban was lifted a week later, after Thomas wrote to Prime Minister John Curtin and Western Australian Senator Dorothy Tangney.

== Marriage to Joe Raine ==
On 3 December 1943, Mary Thomas married Arnold Yeldham (known as Joe) Raine, thus becoming Mary Raine (or colloquially, Ma Raine). Joe Raine was a farmer from Manmanning, and a regular guest at the Wentworth when he was in Perth; they had known each other for several years. Joe moved into the Wentworth with Mary, and also became her business partner.

== Medical research funding ==
In the mid-1950s, the University of Western Australia launched an appeal for funds to create a medical school, and the Raines were approached directly for a contribution. A donation was made, with the promise of more in future.

In September 1956 Joe suffered a severe stroke caused by arteriosclerosis, resulting in paralysis. After several weeks in hospital, with no sign of recovery, he was moved to a room in the Wentworth Hotel, with a hospital bed and a team of nurses to tend him. On 11 February 1957 he suffered a cerebral haemorrhage and died. He was buried at Karrakatta Cemetery. Mary inherited Joe's estate, worth £153,906, and donated it to the University of Western Australia (Note: It is possible that she also donated some of her own money. According to the Australian Women's Register the initial donation was £500,000.) to establish the Arnold Yeldham and Mary Raine Medical Research Foundation, with the money to be invested and initially used for research into arteriosclerosis.

In 1957 Raine made a new will, leaving small amounts to some friends and family – she had no children of her own – with the bulk of her estate to go to the university, for the purposes of finding a cure for the illness that killed Joe. She signed a deed of trust with the university to specify how the estate was to be used after her death, and formalising the donation of Joe's estate. At the time of her death, the estate was worth about £1,000,000, making it one of the largest private donations ever made to an Australian university.

== Death and legacy ==
After Joe's death, Raine's health deteriorated, and the University of Western Australia took over management of her hotels. She died on 3 February 1960, and was buried alongside Joe at Karrakatta Cemetery.

The Raine Medical Research Foundation carries their name, but Raine instructed that none of the money she left was to be used for a building or monument in her or Joe's name.

In 1984 the city block that included the Wentworth, Royal and Bohemia Hotels – all now owned by the University of Western Australia, as part of Raine's bequest – was redeveloped and opened in 1986 as Raine Square.

In 2008, a bronze bust of Raine, created by Robert Hitchcock, was unveiled in the university's Winthrop Hall.
