= Salvation Army Congress Hall =

Salvation Army Congress Hall may refer to:

- Salvation Army Congress Hall, Perth
- The Salvation Army, Sydney Congress Hall
