= Wentworth Hotel =

Wentworth Hotel may refer to:

- Sofitel Sydney Wentworth
- Wentworth Hotel, Melbourne
- Wentworth Hotel, Perth
