= Raine Study =

The Raine Study is one of the largest prospective cohort studies of pregnancy, childhood, adolescence and now early adulthood to be carried out anywhere in the world. Its purpose is to improve human health and well-being, through the study of a cohort of Western Australians from before birth onwards.

The Raine Study is a joint venture between The University of Western Australia, Curtin University, Telethon Kids Institute, Women and Infants Research Foundation, Edith Cowan University, Murdoch University and The University of Notre Dame Australia and receives additional funding from the Raine Medical Research Foundation and National Health and Medical Research Council.

== History ==
Originally known as The Western Australian Pregnancy Cohort, the Raine Study was established in 1989 to determine how events during pregnancy and childhood influence health in later life. 2,900 pregnant women (Gen1) entered the study and 2,868 live births (index participants = Gen2) were recruited into the Raine Study cohort between 1989 and 1992. An additional circa 100 grandparents (Gen0) and 750 offspring of Gen2 (Gen3) have been registered with the Study as of August 2021.

The Raine Study started as a randomised controlled trial to examine the effects of frequent and repeated fetal ultrasound imaging studies on birth outcomes.

It has since become a multi-generational study that provides information on the developmental origins of health and disease. The index participants in the study have had physical assessment, questionnaire and biosample data collected at ages 18 and 36 weeks gestated, 1, 2, 3, 5, 14, 17, 18, 20, 22, 27 and 28 years of age.

== See also ==
- Avon Longitudinal Study of Parents and Children
