= Raine Square =

Property in Perth, Western Australia

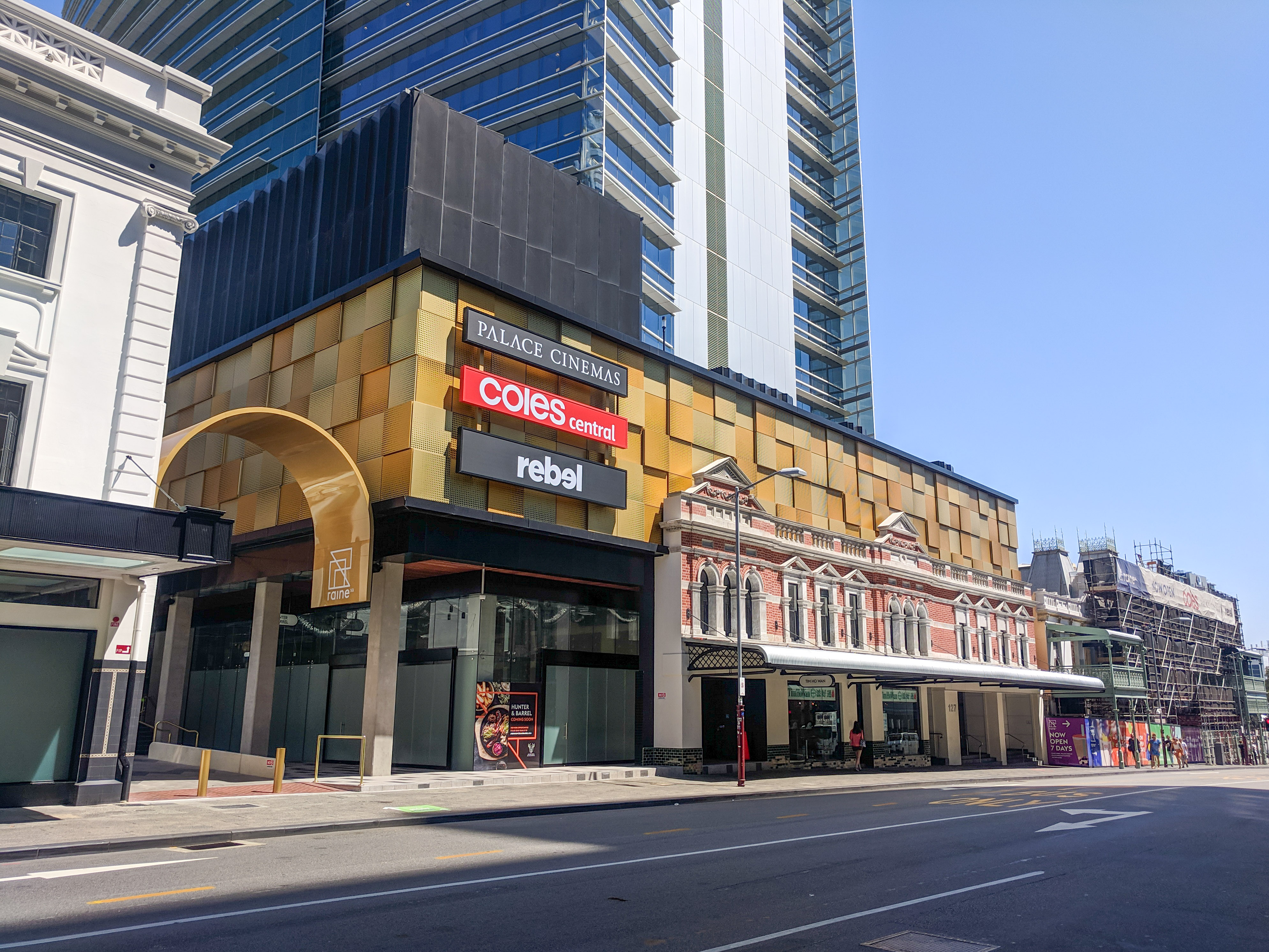
- William Street façade of Raine Square
- Location: Perth, Western Australia
- Coordinates: 31°57′04″S 115°51′26″E
- Website: Official website

Western Australia Heritage Register
- Type: State Registered Place
- Reference no.: 9824

Raine Square is a property in the central business district of Perth, Western Australia. It is in a block bound by Murray Street, William Street and Wellington Street. The square is named after Joe and Mary Raine.

== History ==
The square was formed as a pedestrian way through land surrounded by hotels acquired by the University of Western Australia in the 1960s, including the Wentworth and the Royal hotels. The name was used in 1984, and the square officially opened in 1986.

=== Redevelopment ===
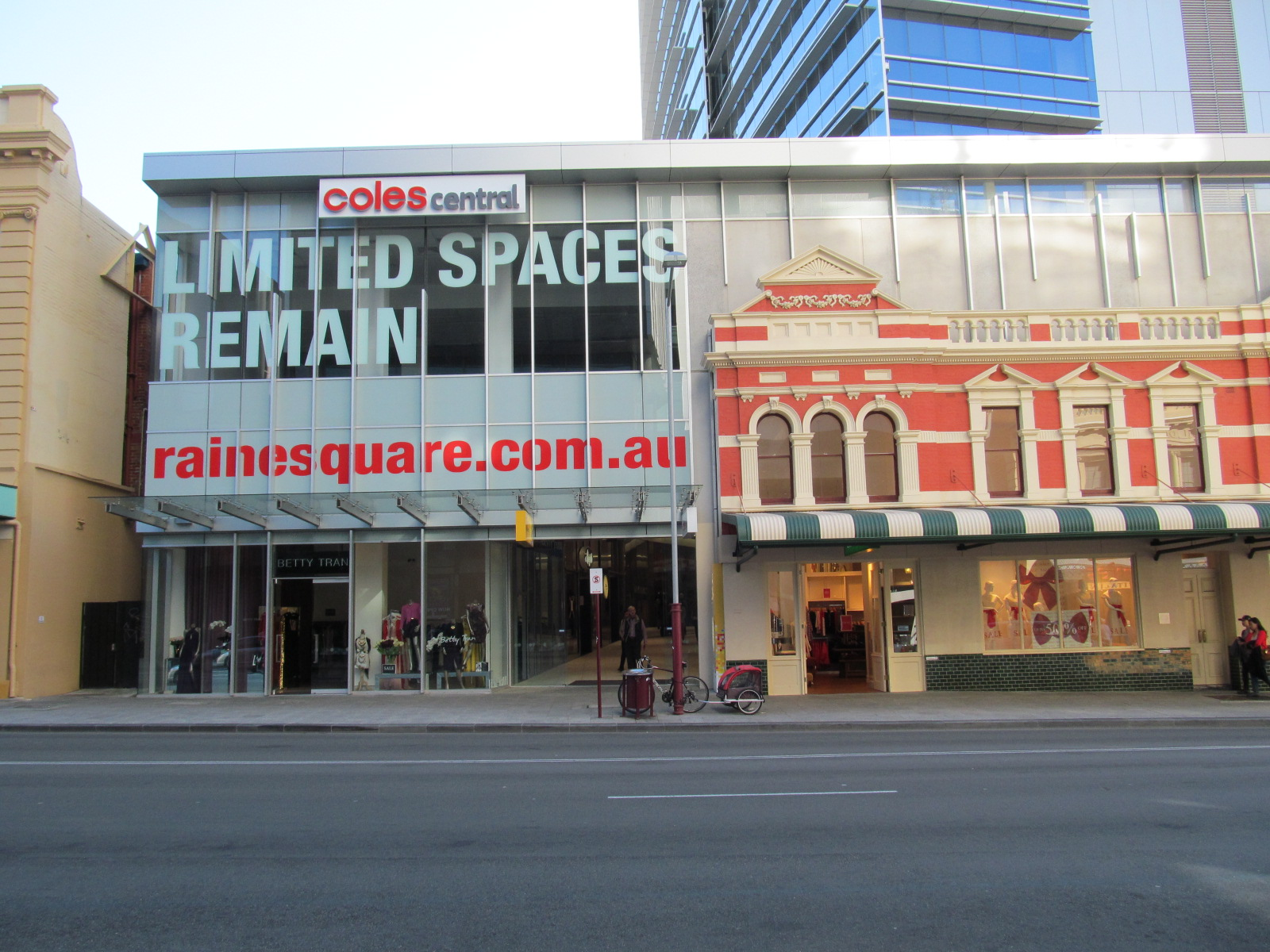
Raine Square after its redevelopment in 2012

The later development of the square involved the construction of a large multi-storey building over what had been the square, maintaining some of the heritage properties that had been on the periphery of the original square. It has since gone through a range of owners and developments since the original construction. In 2017 further developments were made to the complex of properties related to Raine Square.

== Transport links ==
Raine Square features a connection to Perth Underground station, and the free red CAT bus service which stops nearby. Multiple bus services can be accessed via William and Wellington streets.
