= East Perth Cemeteries =

Cemetery in East Perth, Western Australia

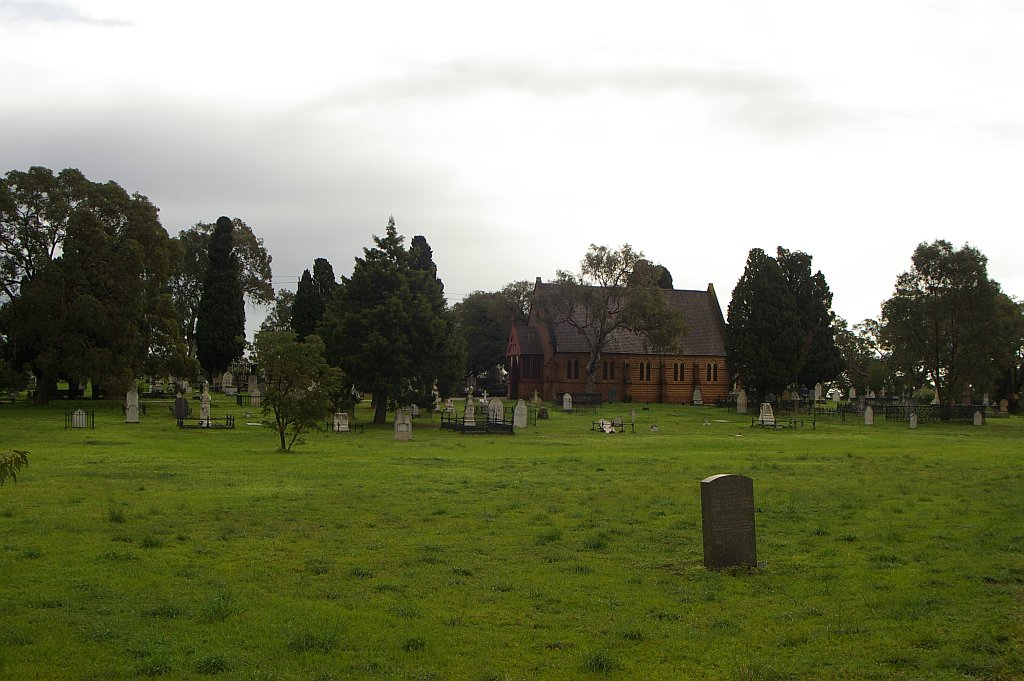
- East Perth Cemeteries, looking towards St Bartholomew's Church from the south east corner

- Location within Perth
- East Perth Cemeteries is situated west of the Burswood peninsula

Details
- Location: East Perth, Western Australia
- Coordinates: 31°57′20.99″S 115°52′41.52″E
- Find a Grave: East Perth Cemeteries

Western Australia Heritage Register
- Official name: East Perth Cemeteries
- Type: State Register
- Designated: 6 March 1992
- Reference no.: 2164

Australian National Heritage List
- Official name: East Perth Cemeteries
- Type: Historic
- Reference no.: 106260
- Place File Number: 5/11/020/0012

Register of the National Estate
- Official name: East Perth Cemetery
- Type: Historic
- Designated: 21 March 1978
- Reference no.: 10315
- Place File Number: 5/11/020/0012

East Perth Cemeteries was the first cemetery established for the Swan River Colony in 1829 in East Perth, Western Australia. It is estimated that as many as 10,000 people were buried there between 1829 and 1919 in seven independently administered denominations or sections which is why the place is known as 'East Perth Cemeteries'. Only around 800 gravesites have been identified. A large section of the original site has since been built over, leaving about 5 hectares (12.5 acres) remaining.

The site, which is a short distance from Gloucester Park and the WACA Ground, is now bounded by Plain Street, East Perth, Wittenoom Street, Bronte Street and Waterloo Crescent.

== History ==
St Bartholomew's Church. c. 1940; image is of the Western side

The cemetery site was surveyed by John Septimus Roe on 24 December 1829 soon after the central portions of the Perth townsite had been surveyed. The area was originally known as Cemetery Hill and was established in 1830. The first burial was of Private John Mitchell from the 63rd regiment. Mitchell died on 6 January 1830; the exact location of his grave site is unknown. A public notice from Peter Broun, the Colonial Secretary on 13 February 1830 said: "to prevent indiscriminate Burials and unpleasant consequences arising therefrom in a warm climate, a Burial Ground will be set apart in Every Township or Parish ... burials will take place in them only and a Register will be kept ... all Burials by the Chaplain will be restricted to times as soon after sunrise as possible, or an hour precisely before sunset..." As it happened, both Broun and Roe were buried in the cemetery and their tombstones are still visible.

The Trustees of the Church of England were granted Perth Town Lot R1 as a general cemetery in 1842. The cemetery was consecrated in 1848, and over the following decades sections of this were granted to various other denominations and ethnic groups with each cemetery being owned and controlled separately. The subsequent grants were: Roman Catholic (1848); "Wesleyanism" (i.e. Methodist; 1854); Congregational (1854); "Hebrew" (i.e. Jewish 1867); Presbyterian (1881); and Chinese (1888). Each of the grants were administered independently, with the exception of the Chinese section.

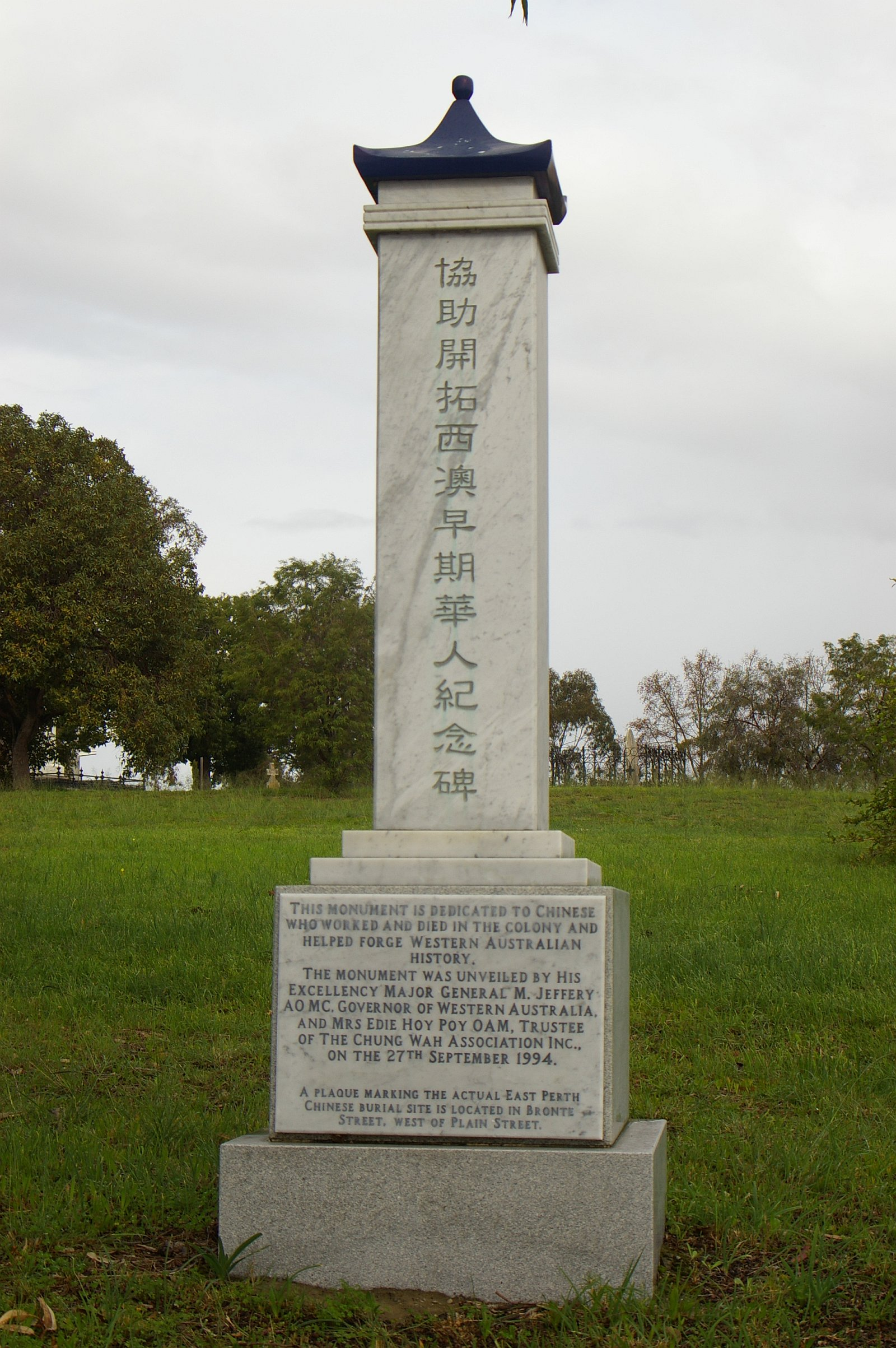
Memorial to people of Chinese ethnicity who are buried in the cemeteries. A plaque on Bronte Street near the corner of Plain Street marks the location of the Chinese cemetery.

In 1899, Karrakatta Cemetery became the main burial ground in close proximity to Perth, and from July that year burials officially ceased at East Perth, except where special applications were made to use family graves. The cemetery was used intermittently from then until the last burial in 1919.

Throughout most of the 1900s, the grounds, which adjoined an industrial area, were subject to vandalism and neglect. Appeals from individuals and the Royal Western Australian Historical Society for it to be refurbished given its historical significance continued over some time. In 1931, the Sunday Times reported:

When a representative of this paper visited the cemetery yesterday he found a skull almost intact, leg and arm bones, and other parts of poor mortal remains. These were lying on the rank green grass close to a bricked hole leading to the vault. From the ground above, the rest of the bones could be plainly seen.

When the general public can depend upon viewing the actual remains of a dead person, and when mere children also have sight and access to such, it is time that someone in authority awakened.

— The Sunday Times, 1931

In the 1930s, the various church authorities relinquished control of the individual grants and the entire site was then re-vested as Crown land and declared a disused burial ground. From the mid-1930s, control and responsibility for the grounds moved between various government departments and numerous projects were undertaken to refurbish the historic site.

Much of the area devoted to the Chinese, Jewish and Presbyterian sections was originally located west of Plain Street, and an unused Anglican section was located south of Bronte Street. In the late 1940s, these sections were excised and existing headstones removed. Some land west of Plain Street was used by the former Perth Girls' School. Fences separating the individual cemeteries were removed and those areas are now roadways, carparks and commercial and residential buildings. An access road called Forrest Avenue (previously Cemetery Road) crossed diagonally over the block which now houses the multi-storey Don Aitken Centre. Extensions of Wickham and Horatio Streets have been incorporated into the grounds.

A major redevelopment project in the late 1980s provided for landscaping and perimeter fencing to protect the church and remaining monuments from vandalism.

In 1994, the National Trust of Western Australia became responsible for the management and conservation of the East Perth Cemeteries after being approached by the Department of Conservation and Land Management.

The East Perth Cemeteries are significant for the following reasons:

- the place is a rare surviving group of colonial cemeteries which have retained a high degree of integrity and authenticity within the central business district of an Australian capital city
- the place is associated with the growth of Perth from a small colonial community to a thriving metropolis and contains the graves from a cross-section of its first colonists from the 1830s–1890s. The place is also associated with a number of public servants and religious leaders who were important to the development of colonial Perth
- the place displays the changes in headstone and cemetery design between 1830–1899 and holds important genealogical information on many Western Australian families
- the place contains the only mortuary chapel, constructed in Western Australia, which was later converted to function as a parish church and,
- the place offers a landscape setting and experience of isolation, tranquility and simplicity that provides a rare contrast to the more verdant, intensely developed public landscapes within the City of Perth.

The National Trust of Australia (WA) is responsible for conservation works, landscape maintenance and education and learning programs for local schools. The Trust is reliant on grants for ongoing conservation works and also has the support of valued volunteers who act as guides and assist with conservation, maintenance and managing burial records.

Much of the retained burial ground lacks visible signs of graves or markers, partly because perishable timber crosses and monuments were used for burials of the poor.

== St Bartholomew's Church ==
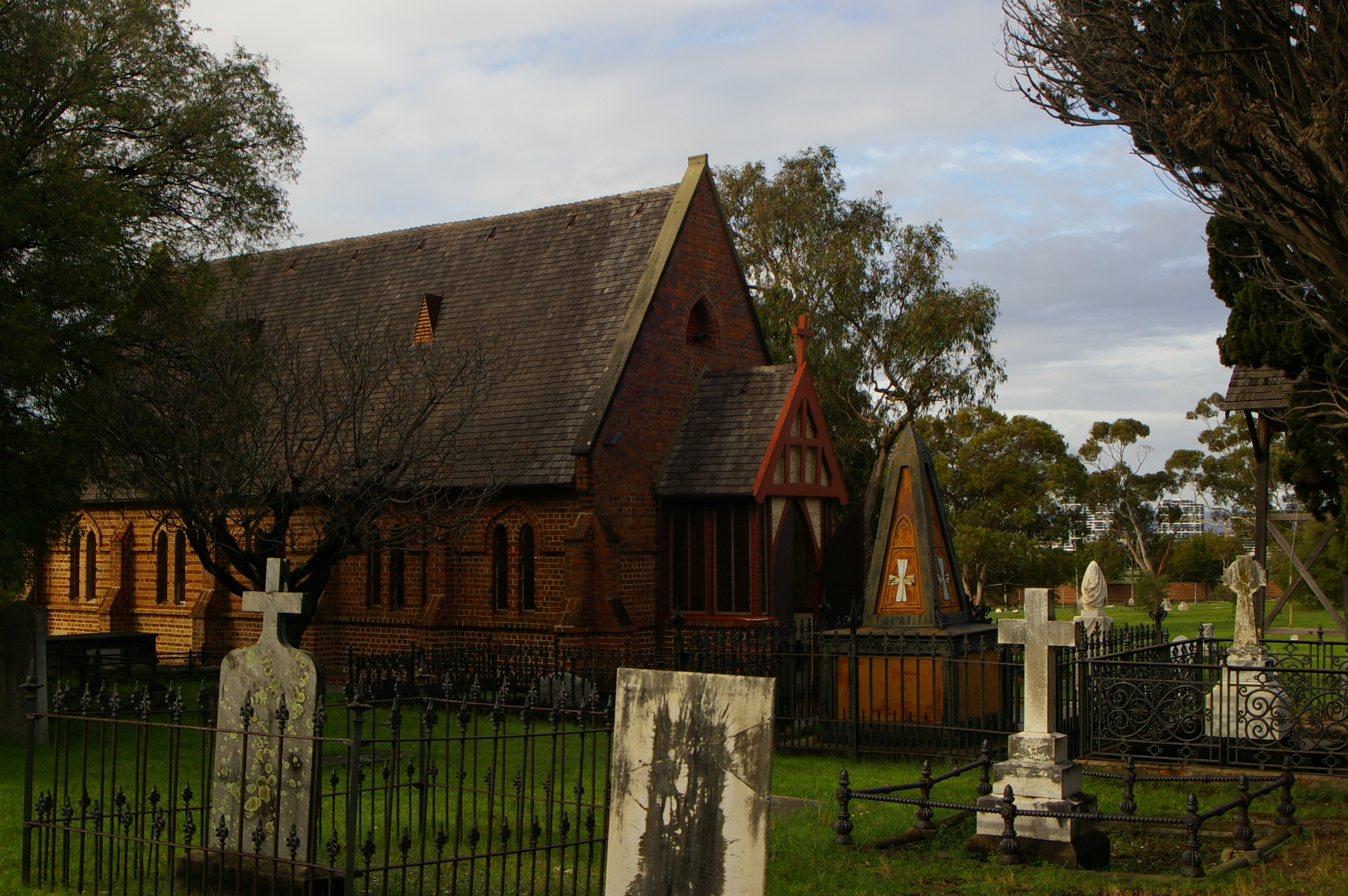
St Bartholomew's Church

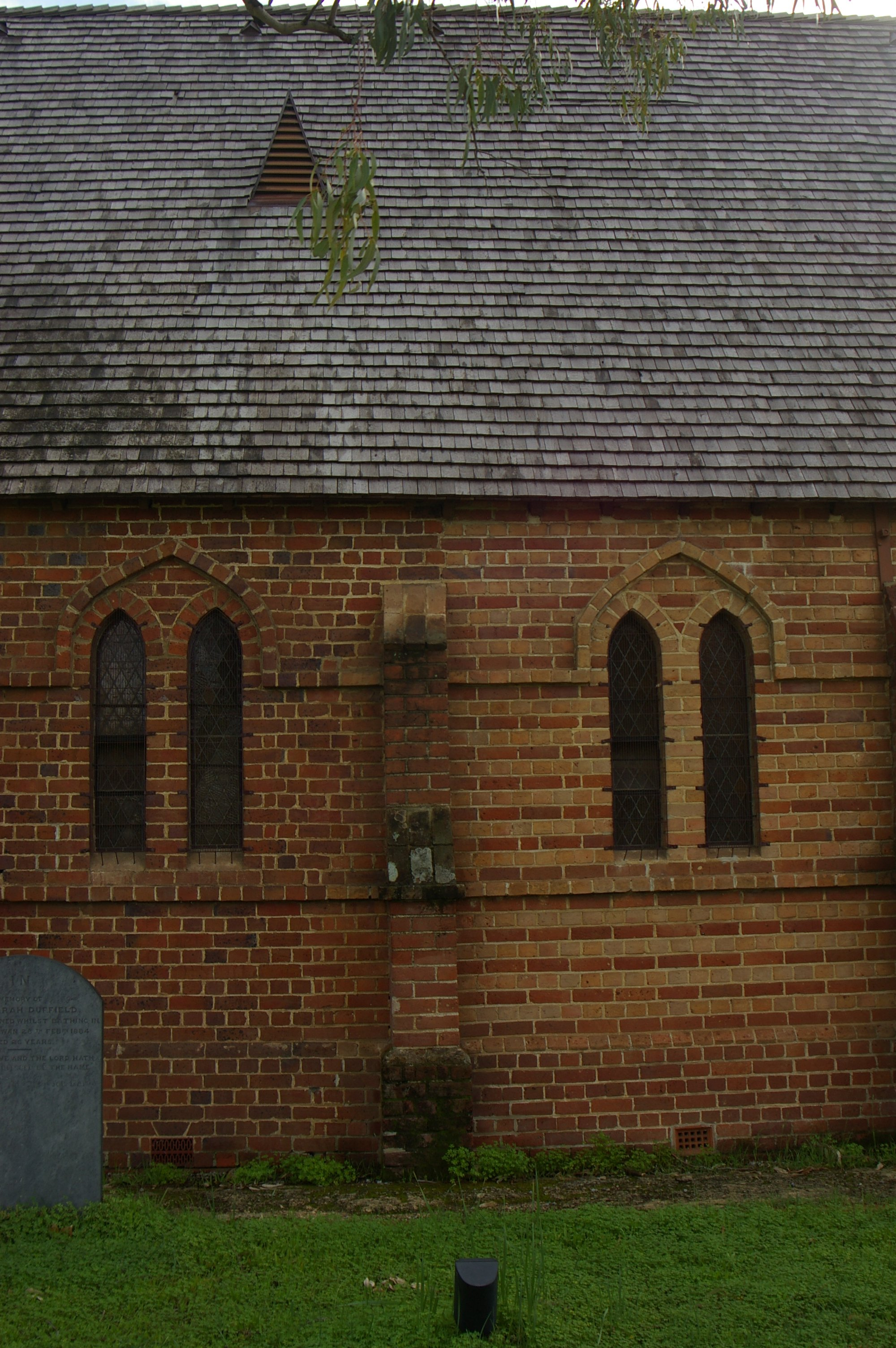
Eastern wall of St Bartholomew's showing the difference in brick work from the 1900 extensions

The Anglican St Bartholomew's Church is the sole building still standing within the grounds. It was built as a mortuary chapel in 1848. In about 1870 an extension designed by colonial architect Richard Roach Jewell was incorporated and the enlarged building was consecrated as a parish church by the first Bishop of Perth, Mathew Blagden Hale on 16 February 1871.

The church was further extended in 1900 with the enlargement of the sanctuary and nave. These extensions were consecrated on 22 March 1900 by Charles Owen Leaver Riley, the third Bishop of Perth.

St Batholomew's became a popular place of worship for many of the wealthier and predominantly Anglican households in the city which typically lived on Adelaide Terrace and overlooked the Swan River. Attendances declined, however, from about the 1930s when many of Perth and East Perth residents moved to West Perth and other more socially acceptable areas. It was refurbished in 1954 but ceased to function as a parish church in 1963 and for a period operated as a refuge for homeless men from nearby St Bartholomew's House. In November 2002 the Perth Diocese recommenced services at the church and these continue to be held on the 1st, 3rd and 5th Saturdays of each month.

The church and the East Perth Cemeteries were Classified by the National Trust of Australia (WA) in 1973; entered on the Register of the National Estate in 1978 and added to the State Register of Heritage Places in 1992.

== Timeline ==
- 24 December 1829: site surveyed by John Septimus Roe
- 6 January 1830: first recorded burial, that of Private John Mitchell
- 1848: first portion of St Bartholomew's built
- 16 February 1871: St Bartholmew's enlarged and consecrated as a mortuary chapel by Matthew Hale, the Bishop of Perth
- 19 August 1888: St Bartholomew's consecrated as an Anglican parish church, first service conducted by Dean Goldsmith
- late October 1889: a belfry is constructed near the church
- 1899: cemeteries closed, but due to public demand, burials in existing vaults or family graves were extended
- 1900: St Bartholomew's extended with the addition of a sanctuary and the enlargement of the nave, extensions consecrated by Charles Owen Leaver Riley on 22 March 1900
- 1963: St Bartholomew's ceases to function as a parish church
- 17 December 1975: St Bartholomew's and its driveway vested in the National Trust
- 1976: St Bartholomew's restored
- 6 May 1986: the entire cemeteries site enclosed with a wire-mesh fence to stop repeated vandalism
- 1994: National Trust assumes responsibility for the entire site
- 2002: services recommence at St Bartholomew's

== See also ==
- Burials at East Perth Cemeteries
