= Commonwealth Bank building, Perth =

Heritage listed building in Perth, Western Australia

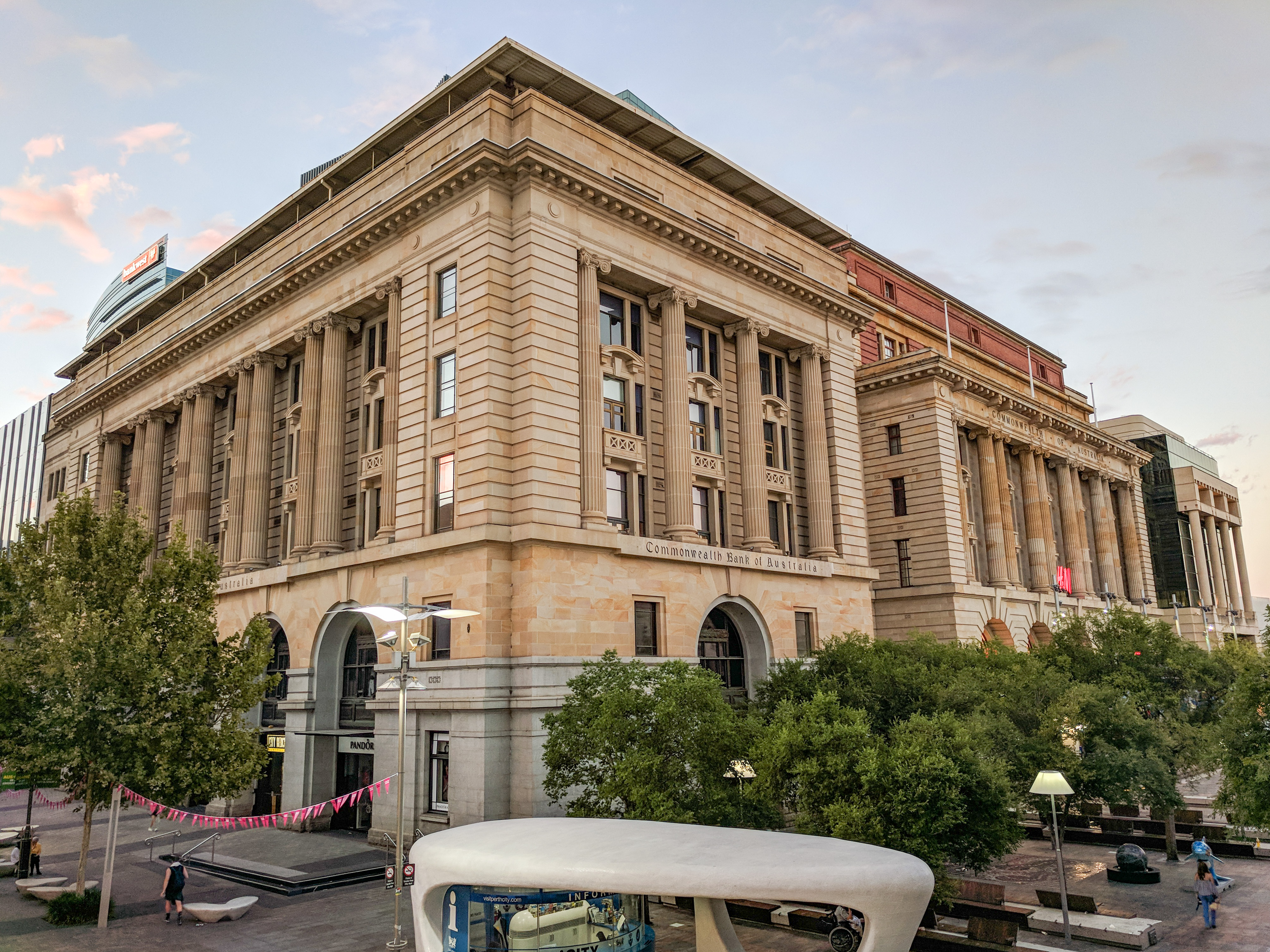
- The Commonwealth Bank Building in 2018
- Interactive map of the Commonwealth Bank building, Perth area

General information
- Location: Western Australia, Forrest Place, Perth, Australia
- Coordinates: 31.9522°S 115.8590°E

Design and construction
- Designations: Register of the National Estate; State Register of Heritage Places

Register of the National Estate
- Designated: 26 September 1982

Western Australia Heritage Register
- Type: State Registered Place
- Designated: 23 May 1995
- Part of: Central Perth Precinct
- Reference no.: 2064

The Commonwealth Bank Building is a heritage building in Perth, Western Australia, on the western side of Forrest Place in the city's central business district.

It was built in 1933, some ten years after the creation of the Forrest Place road between Murray Street and Wellington Street in 1923.
