= Raine Medical Research Foundation =

Australian medical research foundation

Coordinates: 31.969843°S 115.810468°E

The Raine Medical Research Foundation (Note: Originally named the Arnold Yeldham and Mary Raine Medical Research Foundation.) funds medical research in Western Australia. It was created from a bequest by Mary Raine to the University of Western Australia following the death of her husband, Arnold Yeldham (Joe) Raine in 1957.

== History ==
=== Establishment ===
In the mid-1950s, the University of Western Australia launched an appeal for funds to create a medical school, and the Raines were approached directly for a contribution. A donation was made, with the promise of more in future.

In September 1956 Joe suffered a severe stroke caused by arteriosclerosis, resulting in paralysis. After several weeks in hospital, with no sign of recovery, he was moved to a room in the Wentworth Hotel, with a hospital bed and a team of nurses to tend him. On 11 February 1957 he suffered a cerebral haemorrhage and died. Mary inherited Joe's estate, worth £A 153,906, equivalent to A$5.5 million in 2022, and donated it to the University of Western Australia (Note: It is possible that she also donated some of her own money. According to the Australian Women's Register the initial donation was £A 500,000, equivalent to A$17.7 million in 2022.) to establish the Arnold Yeldham and Mary Raine Medical Research Foundation, with the money to be invested and initially used for research into arteriosclerosis.

In 1957 Raine made a new will, leaving small amounts to some friends and family – she had no children of her own – with the bulk of her estate to go the university, for the purposes of finding a cure for the illness that killed Joe. She signed a deed of trust with the university to specify how the estate was to be used after her death, and formalising the donation of Joe's estate. Raine instructed that none of the money she left was to be used for a building or monument in her or Joe's name.

== Supported projects ==
The foundation financially supports the Western Australian Pregnancy Cohort (Raine) Study, one of the largest cohorts of pregnancy, childhood, adolescence and early adulthood to be carried out anywhere in the world.
