= Joep van Liefland =

Dutch artist (born 1966)

Joep van Liefland (born 1966 in Utrecht) is a contemporary conceptual artist from Netherlands. He lives and works in Berlin.

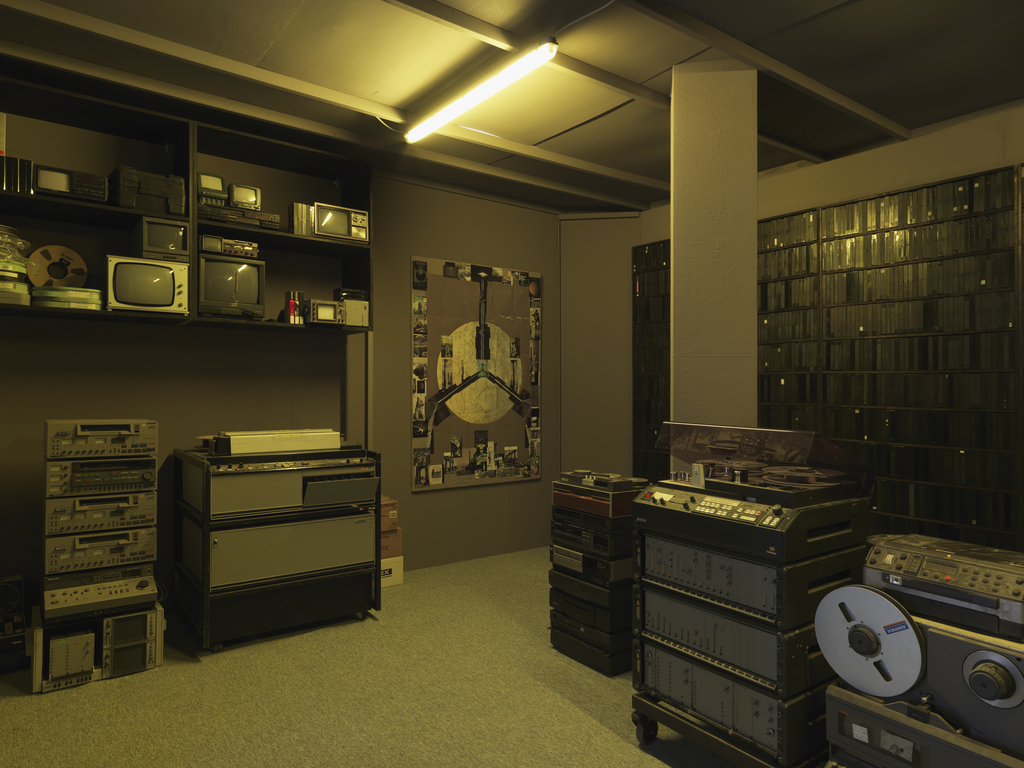
Video Palace 38

His work focuses on the phenomenology of media and their transformation. He is particularly interested in the matter of impermanence and disappearance that are closely connected to the technological progress. Using the example of technology, Joep van Liefland addresses the process of alteration and transformation as well as the universal concepts that underlie the transition from old to new.

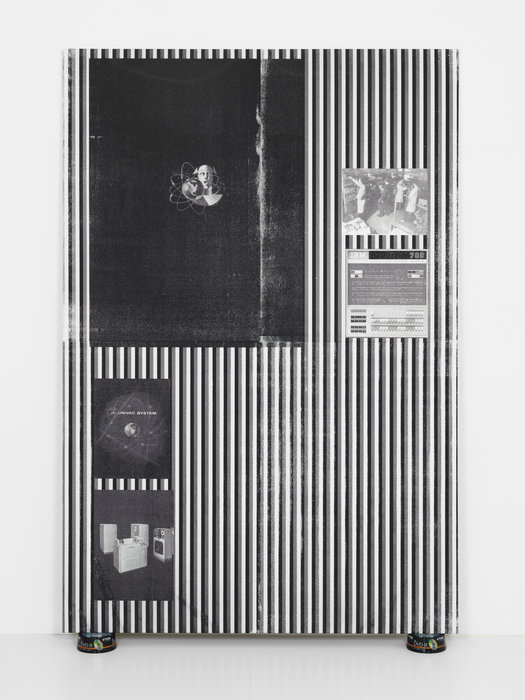
RGB BW comp arch DB 200145 K0405, 2014

For his art pieces, Joep van Liefland uses various outdated distribution and storage devices. He arranges them into space-filling installations, as in the work series „VIDEO PALACE“, or uses them to create sculptures, wall objects, screen prints, and collages.

Since 2001, Joep van Liefland runs, together with Maik Schierloh, the art space AUTOCENTER in Berlin where international art positions are presented regularly.

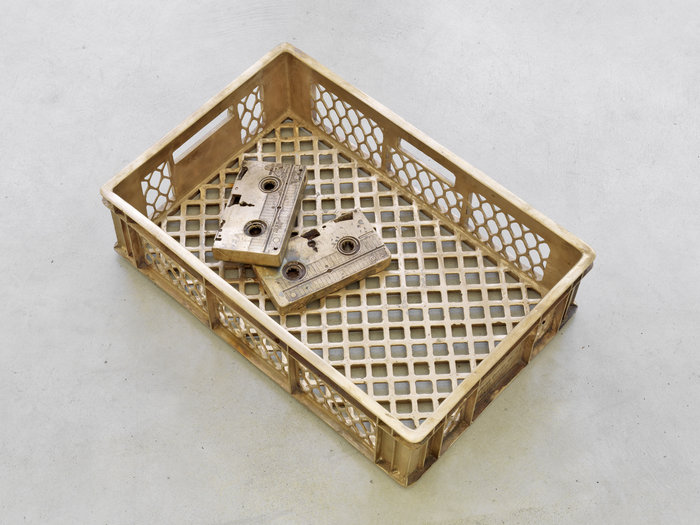
Distribution 1, 2013

== Selected solo exhibitions ==
- 2015 True RGB, Galerie Gebr. Lehmann, Dresden
- 2015 Men in Pain, Ramiken Crucible, New York
- 2014 abc - art berlin contemporary 2014
- 2014 Video Palace #37 – MANIAC, Museum Goch, Goch
- 2013 Traces, Galerie Gebr. Lehmann, Berlin
- 2013 Expired, Galerie Parisa Kind, Frankfurt am Main
- 2011 Metaphysics 2 E 56, Galerie Gebr. Lehmann, Dresden
- 2011 White Noise and Reverberation (mit Bernhard Schreiner), Kunstverein Augsburg
- 2011 Video Palace #33 – Living Dead 1264, Galerie Kai Erdmann, Hamburg
- 2010 Black Systems (Extended Version), Stedelijk Museum Büro Amsterdam, Amsterdam
- 2009 Video Palace 28 – Afterlife, AMP Gallery, Athen
- 2008 Video Palace #26 – Black Hole of Entertainment, Galerie Layr Wuestenhagen, Vienna
- 2007 Video Palace #23 – Hollywood was yesterday, L’Atelier-Galerie Jean Brolly, Paris

== Selected group exhibitions ==
- 2014 Daily Memories, Kloster Unser Lieben Frauen, Magdeburg
- 2014 Unendlicher Spass, Schirn Kunsthalle Frankfurt
- 2013 Oranje, Schlifka/Molina, Buenos Aires
- 2013 Analogital, Utah Museum of Contemporary Art, Salt Lake City
- 2012 The Garden of Eden, Palais de Tokyo, Paris
- 2011 Redefine:Readymade, Kunstverein, Schwerin
- 2010 Schwarz, Märkisches Museum Witten
- 2009 Wach sind nur die Geister, HMKV Hartware MedienKunstVerein, Dortmund

== Bibliography ==
- Joep van Liefland: Traces, Essay von Dr. Jennifer Allen, Hrsg. v. Galerie Gebr. Lehmann, 2013
- Joep van Liefland, Hrsg. v. AMP Gallery, Athen, 2009
