= Don Aitken Centre =

Office building in East Perth, Western Australia

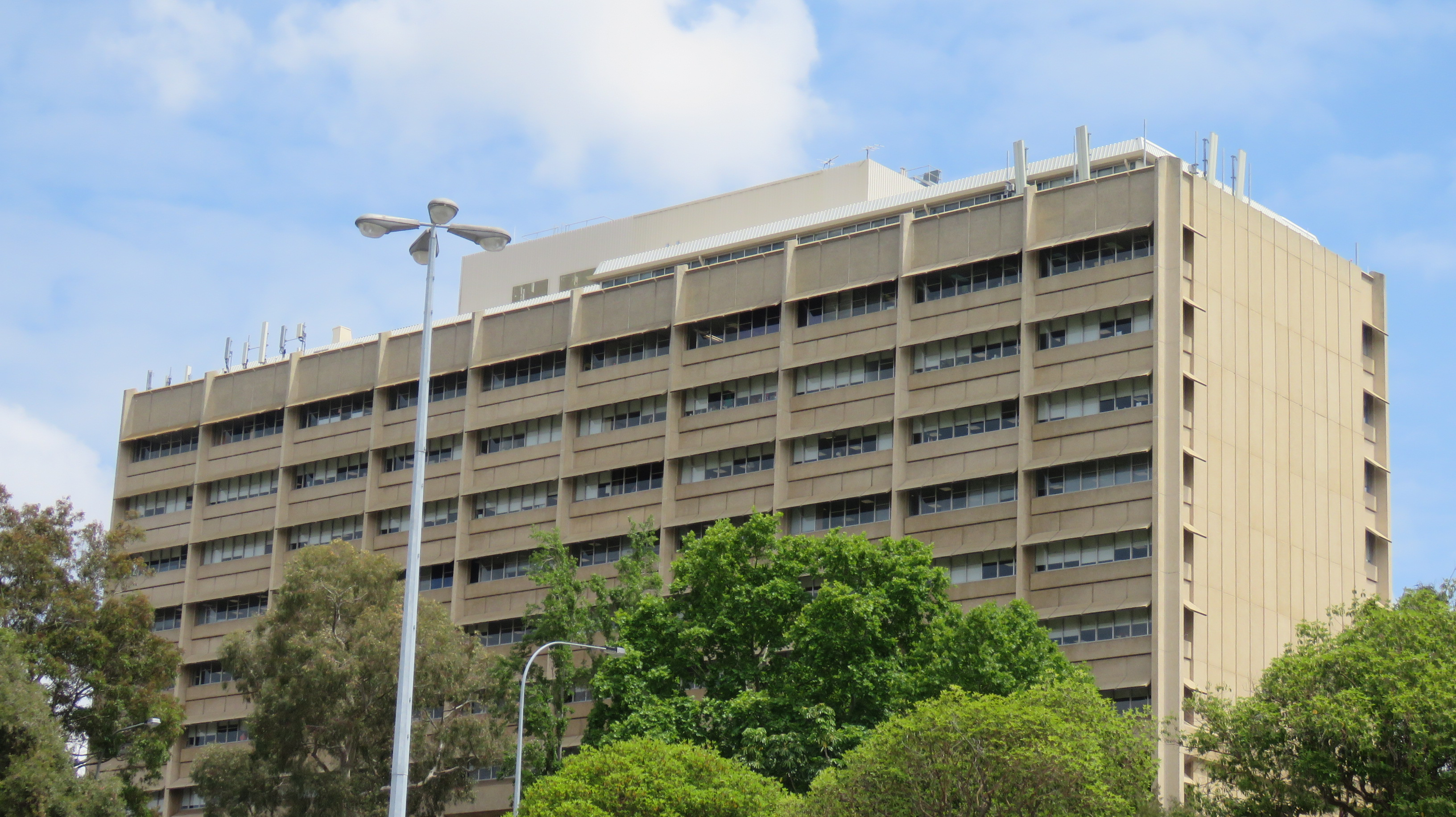
- The Don Aitken Centre seen from the south
- Interactive map of the Don Aitken Centre area
- Alternative names: Main Roads Western Australia Building

General information
- Architectural style: Late Twentieth Century International Style with elements of Brutalist architecture
- Location: 132 Plain Street; East Perth, Western Australia; Australia
- Coordinates: 31.9570°S 115.8771°E
- Named for: Don Aitken, commissioner of Main Roads Western Australia from 1965 to 1987
- Owner: Main Roads Western Australia

Technical details
- Floor count: 10 plus basement

Design and construction
- Architecture firm: Oldham, Boas, Ednie-Brown & Partners

Western Australia Heritage Register
- Official name: Main Roads Building (Don Aitken Centre)
- Type: State Registered Place
- Designated: 9 May 2022
- Reference no.: 26494

The Don Aitken Centre, also known as the Main Roads Western Australia Building, is a 10-storey office building in East Perth, Western Australia. It has been the main office of Main Roads Western Australia since it opened in 1970.

== History ==
Western Australia's economy boomed in the decades following World War II as the state rapidly increased its gold and iron ore production. This resulted in the development of freeways and other roads in Perth, expanding the responsibility of the Main Roads Department. Many colonial and gold rush era buildings in Perth were being demolished as well, to be replaced with modernist buildings. This included the Colonial Barracks, where the Main Roads Department was based. In 1967, it was decided that the Main Roads Department would need its own building. A site was chosen in East Perth at the end of Wellington Street. On the site was a brick house, shed, and changing rooms which were demolished, and a sports playing field which was levelled.

In early 1968, tenders were called for. A contract worth $3,266,330 was awarded, however after a fifth of the work was completed, the contractor went bankrupt, pausing construction until a new contract was signed. The design of the building was done by local architecture firm Oldham, Boas, Ednie-Brown & Partners. H. A. Doust Pty Ltd took over construction of the building, and it was completed in 1970, with Main Roads staff moving into the building in June of that year. This was the first time since 1928 that all Main Roads staff were in one building. Main Roads only had 430 staff, below the building's maximum occupancy of 660 people, so the remaining space was occupied by police administration. The building was officially opened by the premier of Western Australia, Sir David Brand, on 27 November 1970.

The building was named the Don Aitken Centre on 25 May 1993. Aitken had worked for Main Roads for 41 years, including 22 years as Commissioner of Main Roads. He retired in 1987.

On 25 May 2022, the Don Aitken Centre was placed on the State Register of Heritage Places.

== Description ==
The Don Aitken Centre is an office building consisting of 10-storeys plus a basement. It was designed in the Late Twentieth Century International Style with elements of Brutalist architecture. A bronze sculpture by Margaret Priest is located within the foyer. It was officially unveiled by the minister for works, Ross Hutchinson, on 28 October 1970, and forms the basis of Main Roads' logo.

The initial design had eight floors dedicated to office space, one floor with a cafeteria and recreation facilities, one floor for the caretaker's quarters, mechanical rooms and an observation gallery, and a car park in the basement.

The building was positioned such that another office building could be constructed on the same site to the north.

== See also ==
- List of State Register of Heritage Places in the City of Perth
