= Port Admiral Hotel =

Hotel in Port Adelaide, South Australia

- Peter Sagan in front of the Port Admiral Hotel during the 2018 Tour Down Under.

- Location in South Australia

General information
- Location: Largs Bay, South Australia, Australia, 55 Commercial Road, Port Adelaide SA 5015
- Coordinates: 34°39′34″S 138°29′10″E
- Opening: 1849

Technical details
- Floor count: 2

Website
- www.portadmiral.com.au

The Port Admiral Hotel is located on the corner of St Vincent Street and Commercial Road in the centre of Port Adelaide, South Australia.

== History ==
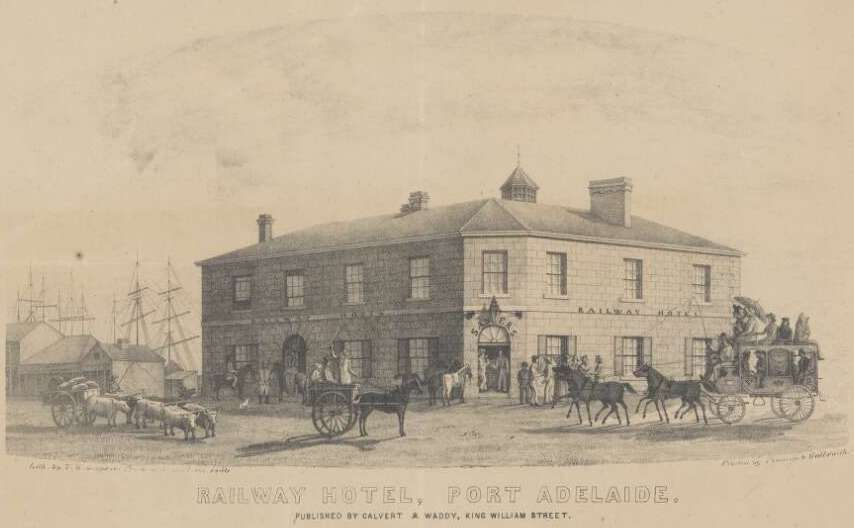
Drawing of the hotel by Samuel Calvert as it appeared in 1850.

The Port Admiral Hotel was built by Robert Sanders and opened in 1849. The hotel was originally named the 'Railway Hotel' to reflect a proposed horse drawn train line. However, subsequent operator Charles Calton decided to rename it after a pub he had previously operated, giving the hotel its current name.

== Restoration ==
In 2006 the Port Admiral Hotel was closed by its operators. After extensive restoration and renovations the Hotel reopened in 2018. It is often referred to as a symbol of Port Adelaide's economic recovery.
