= Salvation Army Congress Hall, Perth =

Heritage-listed building in Perth, Western Australia

Salvation Army Congress Hall
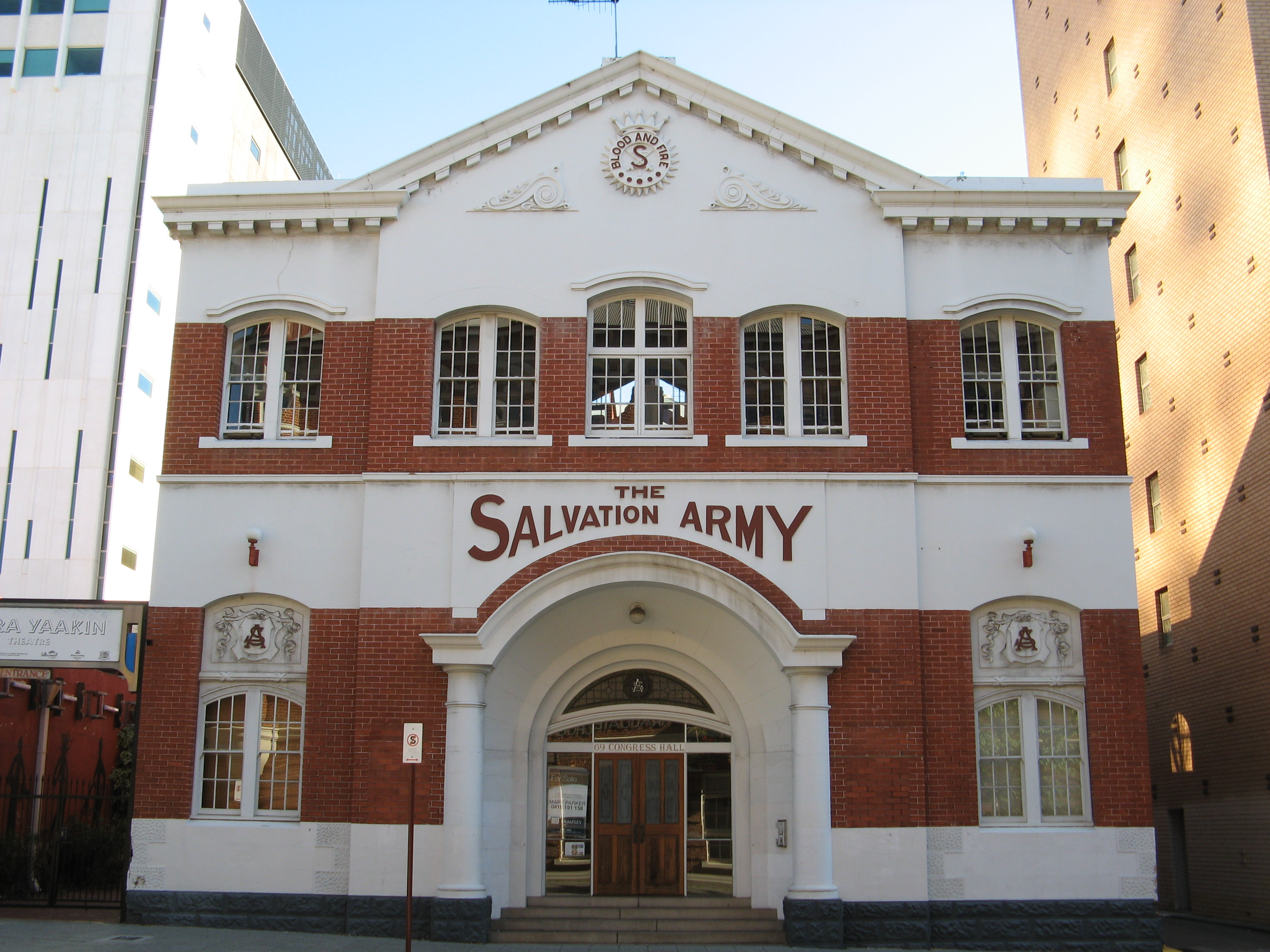
- The Salvation Army Congress Hall in 2017
- Interactive map of the Salvation Army Congress Hall area

General information
- Type: Heritage listed building
- Location: Perth, Western Australia
- Coordinates: 31.954647°S 115.863129°E

Western Australia Heritage Register
- Official name: Salvation Army Headquarters & Congress Hall (former)
- Type: State Registered Place
- Designated: 18 February 2005
- Reference no.: 2084

The Salvation Army Congress Hall is a heritage-listed building in Perth, Western Australia, built for and initially occupied by the Salvation Army. Located at 69 Murray Street, it was built in 1929–1930 in the Inter-War Georgian architectural style. The foundation stone was laid on 3 August 1929 by the governor, William Campion.

The Salvation Army sold the property in 1991.

== See also ==
- The Salvation Army in Australia
