= The Railway Hotel, Southend-on-Sea =

Pub in Southend-on-Sea, England

Coordinates: 51.5367°N 0.7106°E

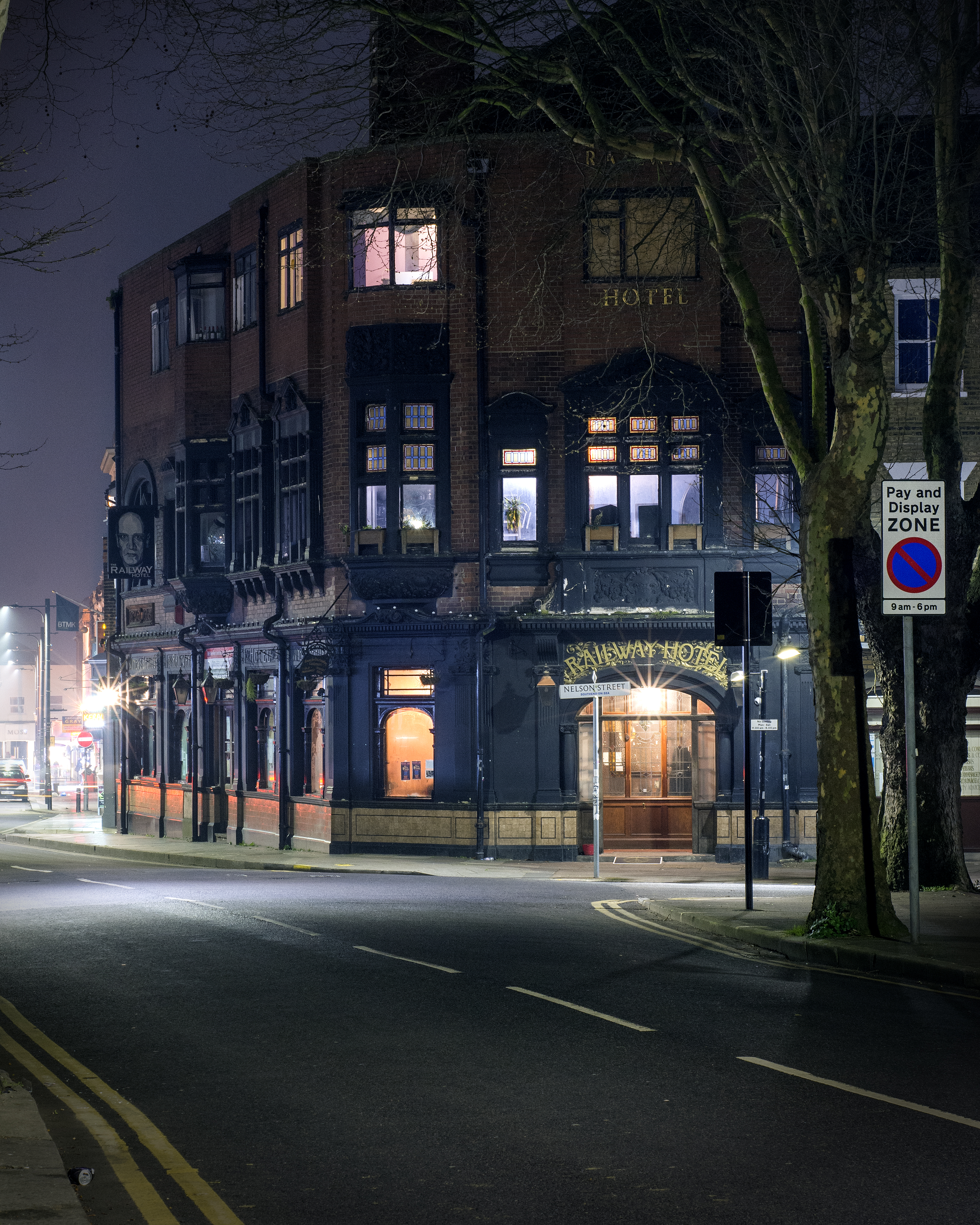
The Railway Hotel (2019), viewed from the west at night

The Railway Hotel is a historic public house located at the end of Clifftown Road in the Clifftown conservation area of Southend-on-Sea, Essex, England. Founded around 1868, it served as a social hub and live music venue for over 150 years, becoming a significant part of the area's heritage.

== History ==
=== Early years and founding ===
The Railway Hotel originated as the Railway Tavern in circa 1868, closely linked to the development of Cliff Town, which followed the completion of the Southend railway station and the construction of Nelson Street between 1859 and 1861. The original landlord was James Arthurson, who held the license from 1868 until 1873.

=== Notable ownership and alterations ===
Ownership and management passed through several notable figures, including Edwin Stedman (who acquired the property in 1882 but never resided there), and James John Wagstaff, who became both owner and licensee in 1897. Significant architectural changes, such as the addition of Dutch gables and decorative turrets, were likely made during Wagstaff's tenure.

In 1900, the building was acquired by Charrington Brewery, which undertook extensive refits during the interwar years, preserving many original Victorian features while updating the interior. Originally, the building had ornate Dutch gables and turrets which were prominent in early 20th-century photographs taken by Charrington Brewery in 1919. These roof decorations were removed in the early 20th century during renovations when the wall line was extended above the second floor to create a nearly flat roof facade.

=== 20th century evolution ===
The Railway Hotel continued as a central social and entertainment venue through the mid-1900s, with licensees changing over the decades. The pub briefly closed from 1940 to 1941 during wartime but quickly reopened. The hotel also suffered some roof damage during the Great Storm of 1987 but was subsequently repaired.

=== 2007 refurbishment and recent history ===
In 2007, local musicians Dave and Fi Dulake took ownership of the Railway Hotel and led a £50,000 refurbishment. The refurbishment uncovered and restored original period features such as parquet flooring and mosaic tiles which had been covered for decades. The first-floor rooms were restructured into a large music venue hosting performances by local and international acts, with jazz nights and vintage film screenings becoming regular offerings.

In late 2018, financial difficulties led the pub to be put up for sale. A community crowdfunding campaign, boosted by support from musician Wilko Johnson, raised funds to save the venue. In mid-2019, management passed to James Vessey-Miller, but persistent challenges including the COVID-19 pandemic forced the Railway Hotel to close permanently in April 2021.

== Architecture and features ==
The Railway Hotel showcases Victorian architectural elements, including English oak bar tops, stained glass vestibules, mosaic floors, and panelled walls reflecting its historic roots. Despite removal of the original Dutch gables and turrets early in the 20th century, the building's facade retains many distinctive period details.

== Community and cultural impact ==
Throughout its history, the Railway Hotel has been an anchor of Southend's creative community, hosting live music, jazz nights, poetry readings, and serving as home to community radio stations such as Ship Full of Bombs. The venue was well known for its bohemian atmosphere and pioneering vegan menu.

== Notable licensees and proprietors ==
- James Arthurson (1868–1873)
- Edwin Stedman (owner, 1882–1897)
- James John Wagstaff (owner and licensee, 1897–1900)
- Charrington Brewery (owners from 1900; various licensees)
- Dave and Fi Dulake (owners and licensees, 2007–2019)
- James Vessey-Miller (manager, 2019–2021)

== Gallery ==
1919 photograph by Charrington Brewery showing original Dutch gabled roof and turrets. 2007 photograph on Flickr showing the pub exterior as taken by Community Archive member. 2019 photograph from Flickr user Robby Virus showing the exterior before closure.
