= Wentworth Hotel, Perth =

Heritage building in Perth, Western Australia

Wentworth Hotel
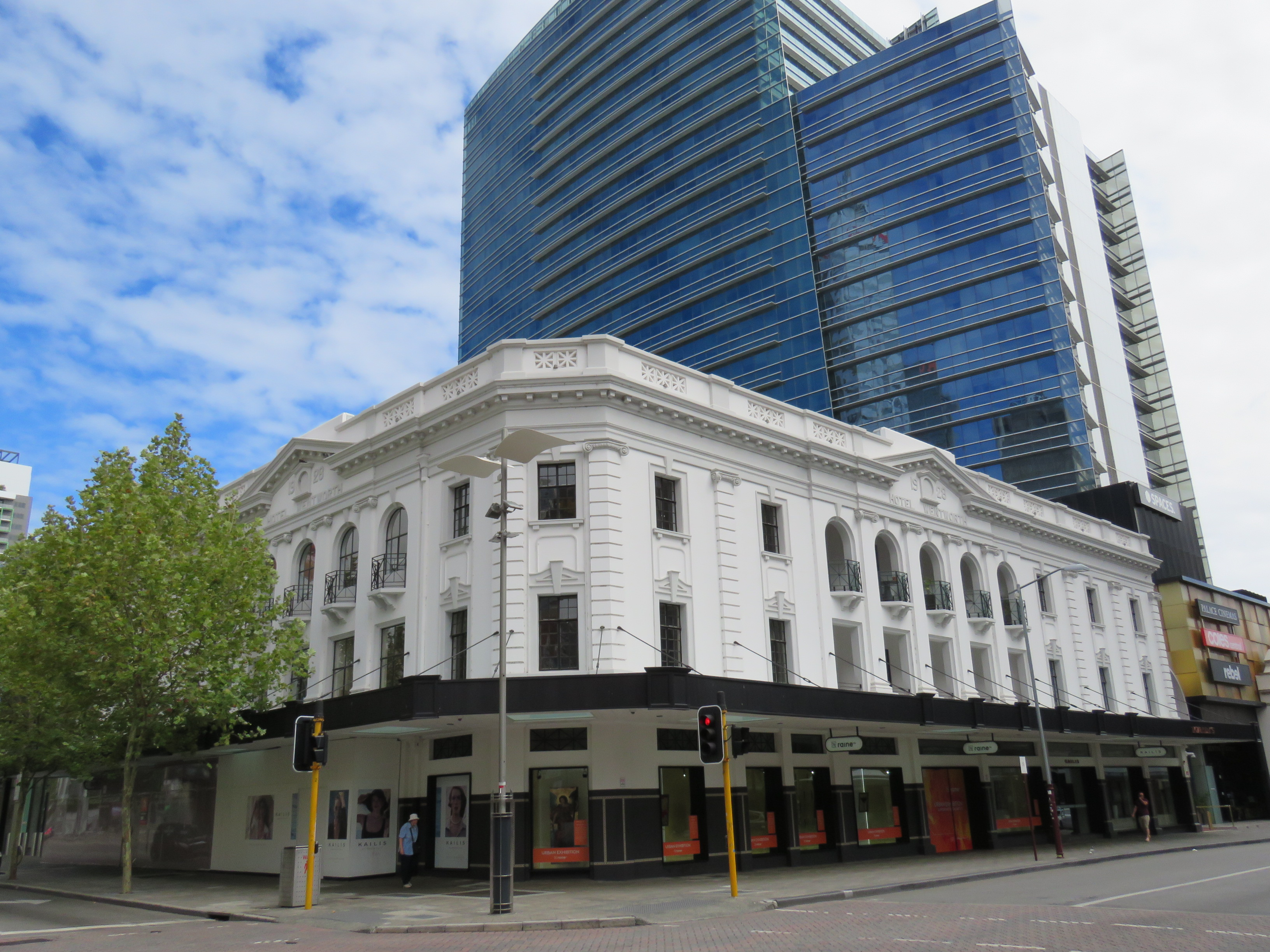
- The former Wentworth Hotel in January 2021
- Interactive map of the Wentworth Hotel area

General information
- Type: Heritage listed building
- Location: Perth, Western Australia
- Coordinates: 31.9521°S 115.8574°E

Western Australia Heritage Register
- Type: State Registered Place
- Part of: William & Wellington Street Precinct (16743)
- Reference no.: 2067

The Wentworth Hotel building is located on the northwestern corner of Murray Street and William Street in Perth, Western Australia. It is part of the Raine Square block, and is included in heritage assessments of that block.

== History ==
The hotel was known as the Gordons Hotel prior to the First World War. It was rebuilt by Mary Thomas (later Mary Raine) in 1927–1928 as the Wentworth, with Western Australian newspapers seeing the centenary of the state in 1929 as a motivation for new and renovated hotels for increased accommodation. During the Second World War the hotel attracted publicity over fighting between troops, causing the hotel to be made out of bounds to troops. The hotel was also cautioned on drinks provision by the licensing court in the same year.

The Wentworth was once one of the busiest footfall locations in Perth. In the late 60's and early 70's, most locations in Perth would have a newspaper seller on a street corner, including in the late afternoon and early evening, and many younger boys did the after-school shift selling the Daily News. The Wentworth was the prime pitch, and always made the most sales and tips. On Saturdays the regular seller (an older man who used to spend his earnings in the Wentworth bar) did not work, so the Wentworth pitch was offered on a rolling rota to the youngsters. For a young man, the Wentworth pitch was a great way to make some cash and develop sales experience.
