= Railway Hotel, Perth =

Railway Hotel
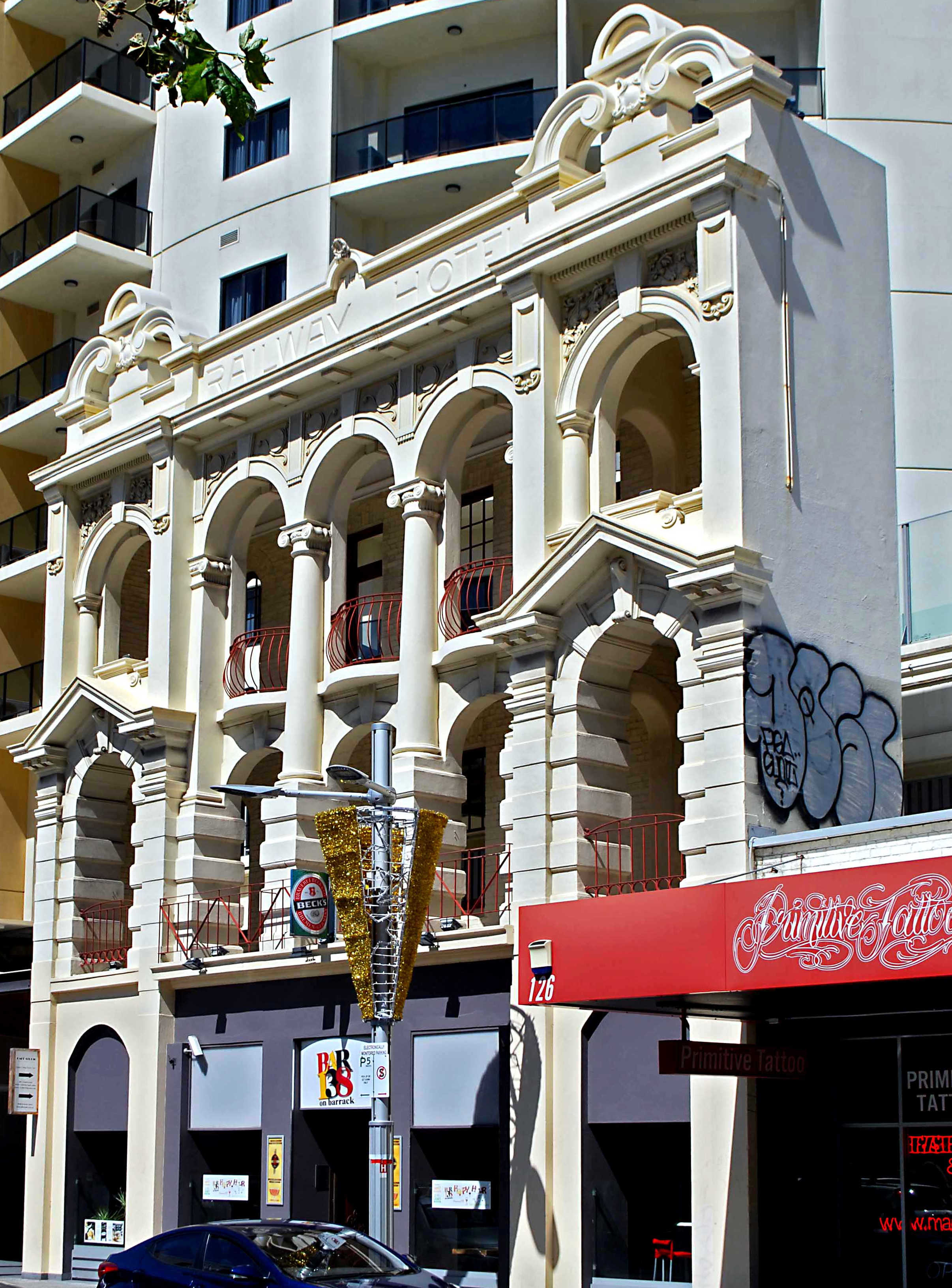
- Former names: Commercial Hotel; Romayne's Hotel

General information
- Status: Demolished
- Type: Hotel
- Architectural style: Federation Free Classical Style
- Location: 138 Barrack Street, Perth, Australia
- Coordinates: 31.9528°S 115.8613°E

The Railway Hotel on Barrack Street, Perth was a hotel that operated from 1844 until the late 1900s.

Built in stages, the hotel originally opened around 1844 as the Commercial Hotel, "an unpretentious two storey building with a shingle roof". On 31 December 1873 there is a lease agreement between W. Sloan & G. King of running the commercial hotel up to 12 August 1878 when George Kings wife Hannah & W. Sloan to examine the condition of the hotel as G. King passed away. In 1879, the Commercial Hotel was relicensed, renovated, refitted and redecorated by its new licensee C. O. Speight, and reopened as Speight's Railway Hotel. In 1897, a large dining room and a "well-lighted" billiard room were added and the façade was improved and flanked with a three-storey tower. In 1906 the hotel was almost entirely rebuilt into an imposing three storey structure, designed by architects Porter and Thomas and built at a cost of nearly £5000; its Federation Free Classical style with circular columns, deep-set verandahs, classical motifs, arches, pediments, pilasters, and a highly decorated parapet is the elevation seen today.

In 1992, Joe Scaffidi, a property developer and husband of Lisa Scaffidi (who became Perth Lord Mayor in 2007–2018) demolished the hotel and much of the façade of the historic Railway Hotel in contravention of a permit which required that the façade had to be retained. He became the first person to be prosecuted under the Heritage Act and was ordered to rebuild the façade, but made no attempt to integrate the now freestanding structure into his multi-storey development. It remains one of Perth's most egregious examples of facadism.
