= Royal Hotel, Perth =

Hotel in Perth, Western Australia

Royal Hotel
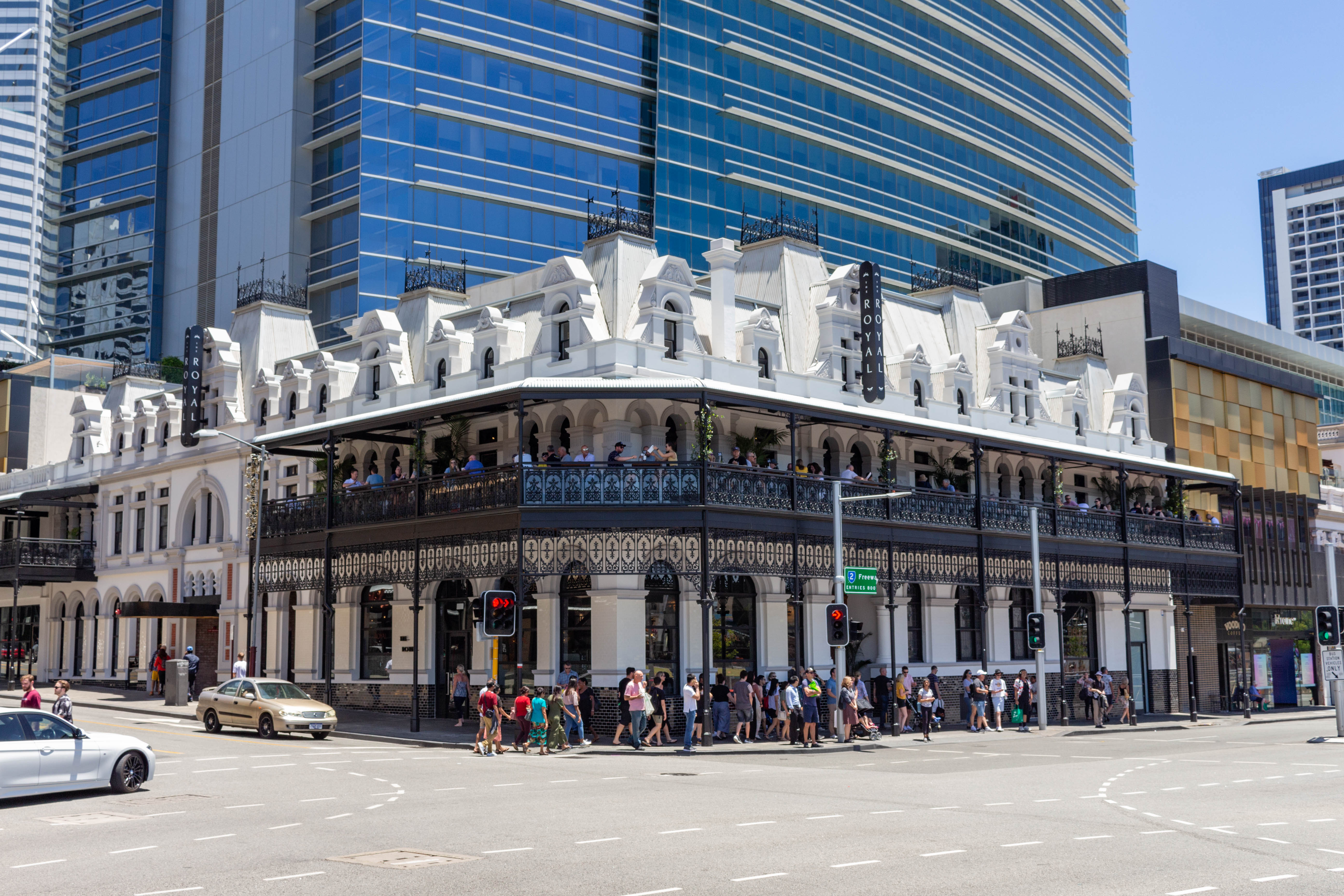
- The Royal Hotel in December 2019

General information
- Type: Heritage listed building
- Location: Perth, Western Australia
- Coordinates: 31.9513°S 115.8579°E

Western Australia Heritage Register
- Type: State Registered Place
- Designated: 25 August 2000
- Reference no.: 2148

The Royal Hotel is a heritage listed hotel building in Perth, Western Australia on the corner of Wellington and William streets. It was built in 1882.

In 1894, the hotel was known as the Schruth's Royal Hotel. A major upgrade of the facade of the building was completed in 1906, and it was then bought by the Swan Brewery in 1925.

The hotel building remains despite extensive changes to its surroundings being made throughout the twentieth century. Following extensive renovations, a pub occupying the building opened on 16 November 2019 under the name The Royal.

In 2026, in order to efficiently restructure after the dissolution of its parent company, the hotel was briefly and voluntarily placed in administration.
