= List of urban plans =

This is a list of urban plans, which are used by urban planners to direct the future growth of cities.

== Historic plans ==
=== Australia ===
==== Melbourne ====
- Melbourne Metropolitan Planning Scheme 1954

==== Perth ====
- Colonial Town Plans of Perth (1829, 1838)
- Plan for the Metropolitan Region, Perth and Fremantle (1955)
- Corridor Plan for Perth (1970)

==== Sydney ====
- County of Cumberland planning scheme (1948)

=== Canada ===
- Greber Plan (1950)

=== China ===
- Greater Shanghai Plan (1929)

=== France ===
- Haussmann's renovation of Paris (1853)
- Plan Voisin (1925)

=== Germany ===
- Hobrecht-Plan (1862)
- Germania (1938)
- Pabst Plan (1940)
- Nordstern (1941)

=== Netherlands ===
- Plan Zuid (1915)

=== Philippines ===
- Burnham Plan of Manila (1905)
- Frost Plan (1941)

=== Singapore ===
- Jackson Plan (1822)

=== South Africa ===
- Norweto (1986)

=== Madrid ===
- Madrid Metropolitan Plan (1996)

=== United Kingdom ===
- County of London Plan (1943)
- Greater London Plan (1944)

=== United States ===
- L'Enfant Plan (1791)
- Commissioners' Plan of 1811
- Waller Plan (1839)
- McMillan Plan (1902)
- City Plan for Cincinnati (1907)
- Burnham Plan of Chicago (1909)
- Kessler Plan (1910)
- Broadacre City (1935)
- The Baltimore Plan (1949)
- Pei Plan (1965)
- EPCOT (1966)
- PlaNYC (2007)
- Vision 2020: New York City Comprehensive Waterfront Plan (2020)

== Current plans ==
=== Egypt ===
- New Administrative Capital

=== Ethiopia ===
- 2014 Addis Ababa Master Plan

=== Indonesia ===
- Nusantara

=== Pakistan ===
- Ravi Riverfront Urban Development Project
- Zulfiqarabad

=== Saudi Arabia ===
- The Line, Saudi Arabia

=== United Kingdom ===
- Big City Plan
- London Plan
