= Paul Ritter (architect) =

Australian architect, town planner, sociologist, artist and author

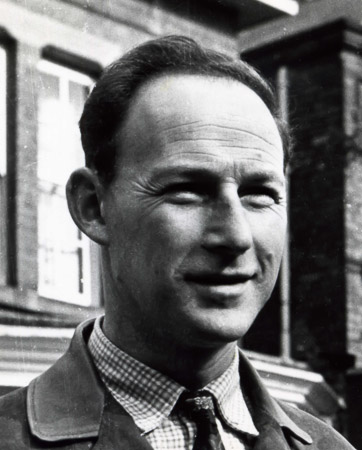
- Ritter in Nottingham, 1964 (aged 39)
- Born: 6 April 1925; Prague, Czechoslovakia
- Died: 14 June 2010 (aged 85); Canshall, Western Australia, Australia
- Education: University of Liverpool
- Occupations: Architect, writer, city planner
- Notable work: Planning for Man and Motor
- Spouse: Jean Ritter

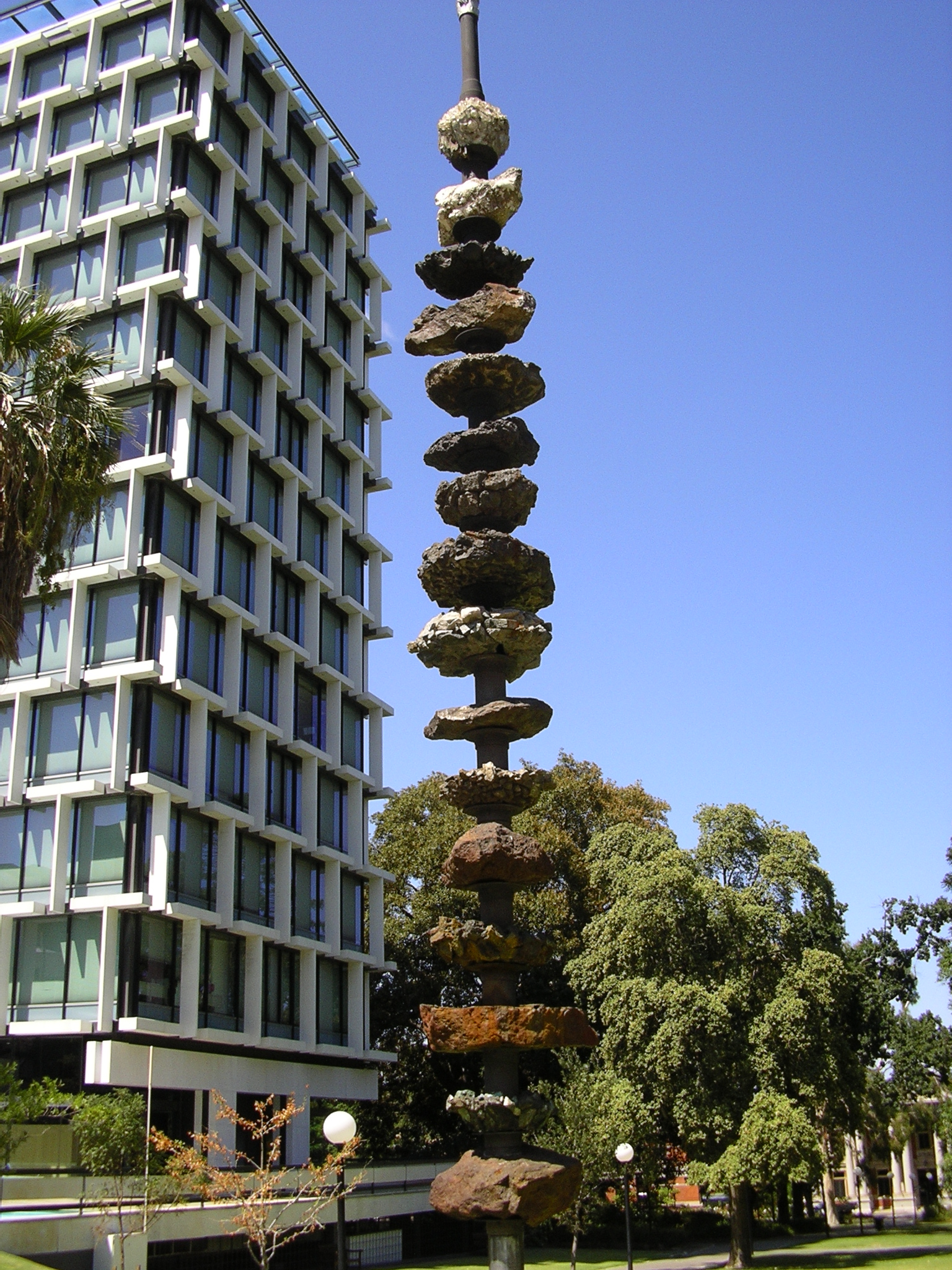
Ore Obelisk (1971-72) in Stirling Gardens with Council House behind. Designed by Ritter and Ralph Hibble.

Paul Ritter (6 April 1925 – 14 June 2010) was an architect, town planner, sociologist, artist and author. Following a world lecturing tour in support of his book Planning for Man and Motor Ritter was invited to become to become the inaugural city planner of the City of Perth. Fired after two years, he remained in Western Australia and spent the subsequent two decades serving as Councillor for East Perth. Ritter is remembered as a brilliant, eccentric and often controversial public figure. He is primarily remembered for saving the Cloisters, playing a role in preventing the construction of an eight-lane freeway on the Swan River foreshore, and the design of Crestwood Estate. Ritter's later career was blighted by a 3-year prison sentence for making misleading statements in applying for export marketing grants.

== Early years ==
Ritter was born in Prague on 6 April 1925 to Jewish parents Carl Ritter and Elsa (née Schnabel). In 1939, at the age of 13, Ritter was evacuated from Czechoslovakia to England via the Kindertransport. He graduated as a Bachelor of Architecture and Master of Civic Design from the University of Liverpool. In 1946 he married fellow-graduate Jean Patricia Finch with whom he eventually had five daughters and two sons.

From 1954 to 1964, Paul and Jean Ritter ran the Ritter Press in Nottingham, where Paul taught at the School of Architecture from 1952 to 1964, when the School moved to the University, and a new professor was appointed.

Throughout their life, the couple would combine their talents, shared interests and idealism in an enduring professional partnership which they named 'The Planned Environment and Educreation Research (PEER) Institute'. Together they wrote and published their first book in 1959 entitled The Free Family, describing how they applied their beliefs about child-rearing to their own children.

== Early career ==
In the early 1960s, Ritter was teaching at the Nottingham School of Architecture while acquiring an international reputation as an architectural theorist with new ideas and unquenchable energy. His 1964 book, Planning for Man and Motor contained his theories and advocacy for the separation of pedestrians and cars and brought him to the attention of the global planning profession. He was recognised as a world authority on town planning matters. A world tour in promotion of this book brought him to Perth, a city for which he expressed great enthusiasm.

== Career in Western Australia ==
=== Chief planner at the City of Perth ===
Mr. W. A. McI. Green, Town Clerk of Perth City Council (PCC), invited Ritter to head the council's newly formed Department of Planning. Ritter accepted, and after migrating with his family to Perth in late 1964, began work as Perth's first City Planner in May of the following year.

Retiring in 1965, Green was unable to have his preferred candidate appointed City CEO, and his replacement, G. O. Edwards, was a man whom Ritter felt was inadequate, and who lacked the experience and ability to keep councillors in order and staff loyal and committed.

Ritter arrived at a transitional time in the history of Perth and his tenure as chief planner was short and turbulent. Ritter saw his role as including that of public advocate and educator and he delivered more than 200 speeches that brought town planning matters to widespread public attention. These public and media appearances led to tension and eventually outright conflict with City administration and some of the City’s Councillors. Mr Edwards, the CEO, tried to enforce a City regulation preventing staff speaking to the media about City business. When the Council banned Ritter from attending a conference in Brisbane it received national media attention and widespread ridicule. The Council, then comprising 26 members, was split between supporters and opponents of RItter leading to some contentious special meetings on the issue.

In 1967, he was controversially sacked. Ostensibly Ritter was accused by the City Council of failing to produce the statutory planning scheme that was required by the Metropolitan Region Planning Authority (MRPA). The MRPA had been formed in 1963 to convert the Stephenson-Hepburn Plan for the Metropolitan Region into a statutory scheme for the whole of Perth. The relationship between the MRPA's Chief Planner, David Carr and Paul Ritter soon began to deteriorate. Perth historian Jenny Gregory believes the falling out was due to the state government's (and Carr's) view that the role of the PCC was to fill in the details of the overarching metropolitan scheme. Ritter himself insisted that, despite some personal animosity, "the one and only major contention" between the two was regarding the Government Freeway Plan, which Carr backed and Ritter vigorously opposed.

Following his sacking in 1967, a committee comprising Sir Walter Murdoch, Mary Durack Miller, Stella O'Keefe, Professor E. K. Braybrooke, Professor G. C. Bolton, Thomas Wardle and Dr. R. B. Lefroy was formed to inquire into the dismissal. He later successfully sued for wrongful dismissal.

=== Councillor ===
With his public profile bolstered by his dismissal, five months later Ritter was able to return to the City of Perth as a councillor for the East Ward. From 1968 to 1986 he would become a prominent figure during the decline and subsequent transition of East Perth. As a councillor he showed concern for the amenity of East Perth, encouraging improvements to programs of street-sweeping and rubbish-removal, and seeking to involve the community in the decision-making process.

As a member of the city's town planning committee he sought to hasten the construction of the city by-pass to overcome the deterioration of buildings in the freeway reserve and the exodus of business and residents. Ritter continued to self-publish newsletters and pamphlets outlining his ideas. "For too long", he wrote in one, "planning East Perth was delayed because of Railway and Freeway uncertainties. Now that these have been overcome and we are pressing for special efforts to give the sort of attention that has been lavished on West Perth to East Perth planning".

=== Architect, consultant and ministerial adviser ===
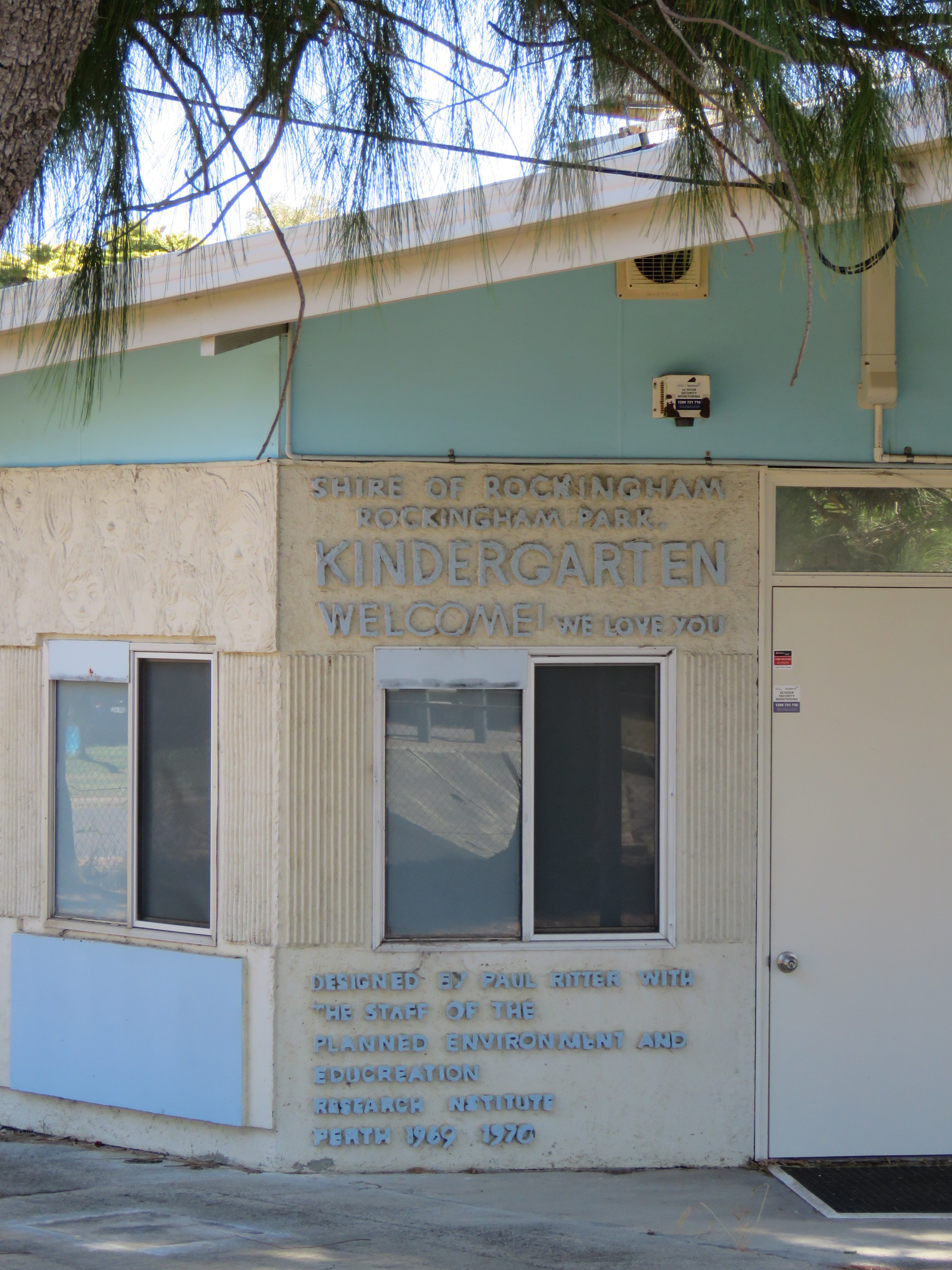
The now disused Rockingham Park Kindergarten, bearing an inscription mentioning Ritter as the designer

In 1968 and 1970, Paul Ritter was involved in the design of the subdivisions of Rockingham Park in Rockingham, and Crestwood Estate in Thornlie, Western Australia. To these he introduced Radburn principles. Every house sits on the edge of a park, and movement on foot through the development via pedestrian underpasses is possible without encountering vehicles.

In 1971, he was appointed by the state Minister for Town Planning (H. E. Graham) to report on the MRPA proposals for the Corridor Plan for Perth; however his report had little impact.

He spent 36 years as a ministerial adviser. He was a member of the 'Committee for a Vision of Perth in 2029'. He also produced the "1999 Ideas Plan" for the City of Perth, was involved with the "Perth in 2029" report and created a series of 13 half-hour Channel 31 TV programs about the report, entitled "The Sensitive Future".

== Imprisonment ==
During the late 1970 and early 1980s, Ritter became increasingly focussed on the promotion of a patented concrete moulding method he called “Sculpcrete”. Ritter's business activities associated with this invention led to serious financial problems and ultimately, a conviction for fraud. In promoting his concrete technology overseas, Ritter had sought to obtain reimbursements for expenses under the Commonwealth government export grants program. After several successful claims, extensive investigations by the export board led to his subsequent applications being denied. His family would later acknowledge that whilst his business practices had been questionable, he had always maintained that if he was doing anything wrong, the board would simply disallow the claims.

In 1983, the Federal police commenced an investigation into whether he had attempted to mislead the export grants board. The investigation included interviews with his overseas business associates and contacts, and led to Ritter’s arrest in August 1984. He received a 3-year prison sentence, of which he served 16 months in Fremantle and Karnet. Paul Ritter maintained that he was framed, but his appeal was dismissed in 1986, and he abandoned an appeal to the High Court of Australia. After his release he published Curses From Canberra: public service conspiracy and the failure of democratic safeguards. The imprisonment and subsequent efforts by the export board and tax office to force repayment of funds led to the bankruptcy of Ritter and his wife.

== Philosophy, legacy and achievements ==
=== Orgonomic Functionalism ===
Between 1954 and 1964, Ritter Press mainly published the journal Orgonomic Functionalism, devoted to the work of Wilhelm Reich, which appeared in 38 issues in 10 volumes. Paul Ritter was the editor and main contributor. Reich did not accept him as his follower, and wrote in a letter to A. S. Neill: "He claims now to establish the TRUE Functionalism. I am a kind of precursor. He is ending in utter confusion." After Reich's death in 1957 Ritter edited a Reich Memorial Volume with contributions by the Ritters, Neill, Nic Waal, and the later Reich biographer Myron Sharaf.

=== Education and child-rearing ===
Paul Ritter was powerfully affected by his experience of the holocaust and spent his life trying to understand humanity and to promote healthy ways of thinking and being. He was strongly influenced by the work of A.S. Neill and Wilhelm Reich. He focussed on the self-regulation of children, educreation (education for creation, growth and change) and city-planning for pedestrians as well as motor cars. At the end of his life he had developed a 'science of relating' that emphasised the need for a therapeutic and empathic approach to all problems. He analysed healthy interactions as having three complete phases: attraction, fusion and liberation.

=== Planning achievements at the City of Perth ===
To some he was a maverick planner, a progressive modernist whose radical ideas took Perth by storm. Yet Ritter saw himself as a counter to the decisive and destructive influence of economic rationalism on the planning and growth of the city at the time.

Ritter's ideas and achievements left a profound and enduring legacy. He created the City's town planning department from scratch, and was responsible for 'a far sighted parking plan' and multilevel structure that took advantage of the central city topography to lay the foundations for a vibrant pedestrian precinct with walkways linking the Northbridge cultural centre via arcades to St Georges Terrace. He worked to preserve many historic buildings through a variety of means, including the alteration of plot-ratio requirements, was partially successful in limiting reflective glass on skyscraper facades and participated in the successful campaign to save the Barracks Arch from demolition. He held frequent public meetings to persuade people of his ideas and drew up a draft town-planning scheme for Perth.

=== Freeway along the Swan River Foreshore ===
Despite substantial differences that resulted in his dismissal shortly afterwards, Ritter convinced the council to reverse an earlier resolution supporting the Government Freeway Plan and instead to oppose it. This is now considered Ritter's greatest legacy, for the plan would have run a freeway down the Swan River foreshore to surround the city with what architect Theodore Osmundson described as an "iron collar [which] can only eventually choke the central city to death". Ritter successfully argued that a freeway along the foreshore would cut the city off from the waterfront and was unnecessary in terms of traffic volumes, and that the proposed northern freeway leg would be sufficient to carry commuter traffic. Ritter claimed that this challenge to Carr's authority was not lightly forgiven, but in spite of this the two individuals "cooperated on virtually all other issues".

=== Views on Jane Jacobs ===
Jane Jacobs's 1961 work The Death and Life of Great American Cities was criticised by many modernist planners and architects of the time, Paul Ritter included. He called her a "muddle-headed influence in planning" and declared that she should never have had the chance to put her ideas forward. Her book was a "shallow analysis of planning problems" and she undermined the best planning practices by taking no account of changes to the car, to the environment and to the modern city. He ridiculed her "confused thinking" and insistence upon streets and small blocks over the superblock for which he was an advocate in his 1964 work, Planning for Man and Motor:

She denounces the superblock as if it had to act in a frustrating way to citizens on the move with its more extensive and traffic-free path areas. She describes only bad use of this principle: "these streets are meaningless because there is seldom any active reason for a good cross-section of the people to use them." This merely means that a path system must make meaningful and plentiful connection with the surrounding areas, satisfying 'desire lines' and giving opportunities for creative additions and citizen-participation.

== Awards ==
- Man of the Year, Architects' Journal, London 1962
- Runner-up, Citizen of the Year, Western Australia, 1974 and 1976

== Memberships ==
- Founder Director, International Traffic Segregation Research Office, 1953
- Member of Advisory Committee of the Civic Trust
- Member of the Royal Institute of British Architects
- Fellow of the Royal Australian Institute of Architects
- Fellow of the Royal Town Planning Institute
- Member of the Royal Australian Planning Institute
- Member of the Metropolitan Regional Planning Authority, W.A.

== Bibliography ==
Environment

- Planning for Man and Motor Oxford: Pergamon Press 1964, 1970
- Humanizing Concrete Ritter Press 1967
- Kids and Concrete Ritter Press 1979
- Concrete fit for people: Towards a Bio-functional Eco-architecture: a Practical Introduction Down to Earth Bookshop/Pergamon Press 1980
- Concrete Renaissance Down to Earth Bookshop/Pergamon Press 1982
- Bio-Building Down to Earth Bookshop/Pergamon Press 1983

Sociology

- Housing and Social Patterns Ritter Press, Nottingham 1957
- Deck Housing Ritter Press, Perth 1965
- Faces of Perth Ritter Press, Kelmscott 1967

Education

- The Free Family, Paul and Jean Ritter, Gollancz, 1959
  - Translated into German by Rowohlt, 1972 & 1978;
  - Translated into Dutch by Nelissen and Bloemendaal, 1973;
  - Translated into Hebrew by Massada, 1973;
  - A later edition, The Free Family and Feedback, Gollancz, 1975, had a large additional section with comments from the children, now young adults, on their upbringing.
- Educreation, Paul Ritter, Oxford Press, 1966
  - Educreation and Feedback, Pergamon Press, 1979
- A Fascinating Record: 25 Years 1953–1978, Peer Institute Perth, Paul and Jean Ritter, PEER Institute, 1978.

Biography and philosophy

- Orgonomic Functionalism (Periodical) Edited by Paul Ritter, Ritter Press, 1954–1964
- Universal Manifestations of Orgone Energy in Spirals Ritter Press, Nottingham 1954
- Some New Formulations in Orgonomy Ritter Press, Nottingham 1955
- Wilhelm Reich; Memorial Volume, Edited by Paul Ritter, Ritter Press, 1958
- The Ten Taboos Down to Earth Bookshop Press, Perth 1981
- Prison Poems, Karnet 1986
- Prison Poems, Karnet 1987
- Curses from Canberra PEER Institute, Perth 1989

Other

- Perth in Peril, Paul Ritter, Ritter Press, 1968.
- ’'Perth Break Through of Break Down: A Crisis in Regional Planning'’, Paul Ritter, PEER Institute, Perth 1971
- ’'Perth central area design co-ordinating study'’ Section: An Answer to the Stephenson Report on Central Perth'’, Paul Ritter, City Council Town Planning Committee, 1975

== Other work ==
In Nottingham and later in Perth, he and Jean Ritter ran several exhibitions called "The Child's Eye View", where everything was built 2.5 times normal size to show adults what it was like to be a child.

In the Supreme Court Gardens in central Perth, his sculpture "The Ore Obelisk" (1971) symbolises the diversity of mining industry from which Western Australia's wealth is largely derived.
