= Directions 2031 and Beyond =

Strategic plan for the Perth metropolitan area

Directions 2031 and Beyond is an overarching strategic plan for the Perth metropolitan area published by the Western Australian Planning Commission. It replaced the draft 2004 Network City and was the first strategic plan to be formally adopted since Metroplan in 1991. Detailed sub-regional planning frameworks containing comprehensive spatial maps were published separately as Perth and Peel @ 3.5 million, extending the strategic timeframe out to 2050. These frameworks, covering Perth’s Central, North-West, North-East and Southern regions, included specific population targets for each local government area. Collectively these targets accommodate an additional 800,000 people in the metropolitan area by 2030 .

== Background ==
Directions 2031 is Western Australia’s fourth major strategic metropolitan development plan since 1955 commencing with the Stephenson-Hepburn plan, the 1970 Corridor Plan and the 1990 Metroplan.

In 2003 work commenced on the preparation of a replacement for Metroplan leading to the draft Network City plan of 2004. This proposed that 60% of population growth be accommodated within the existing built up area with higher density nodes connected by public transport. The draft was never formally adopted but continued to be developed by the Department of Planning, Lands & Heritage. The final version, Directions 2031, reduced the infill density target from 60% to 47%.

== See also ==
- Metropolitan Region Scheme
