= List of lanes and arcades in Perth, Western Australia =

Coordinates: 31°57′15″S 115°51′32″E

The central business district of Perth, the capital of Western Australia, has numerous lanes, arcades and pedestrian malls. In 2007, the City of Perth documented 34 in the city centre, of which nine were owned (or partly owned) by the city, with the remaining 25 privately owned.

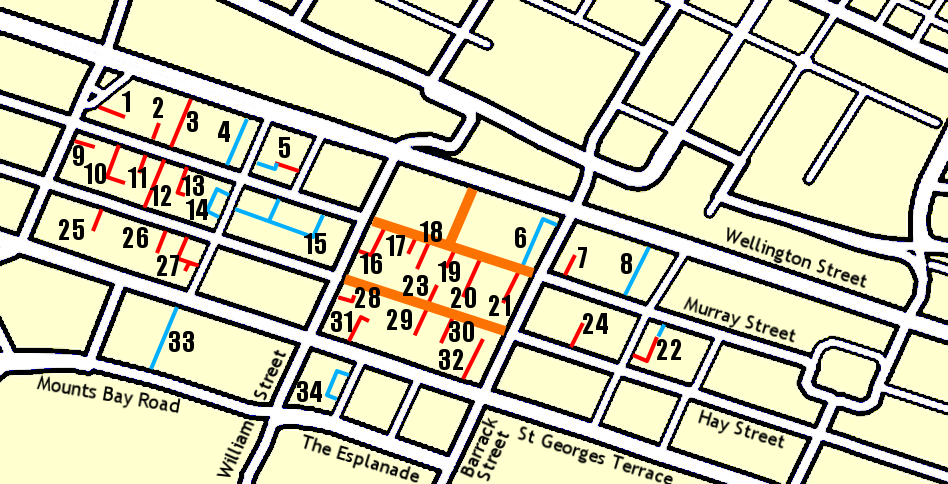
Lanes, arcades and pedestrian malls documented by City of Perth in 2007; privately owned portions shown in red, portions owned by city shown in blue

== History ==
The first plan of Perth, developed in 1829 by the Surveyor-General, John Septimus Roe, was a semi-regular grid pattern bounded by Mount Eliza to the west, wetlands to the north, with three principal streets running parallel to the Swan River and three streets running north-south. The original allotments ran through from street to street in a north-south direction so that properties generally had two frontages.

Following the completion of the central Perth railway station in 1881, the area bounded by William and Barrack streets was consolidated as the commercial and retail centre of Perth. Banks, insurance buildings, professional and commercial offices were constructed at St Georges Terrace, along with businesses, shops and warehouses developed in Wellington, Murray and Hay streets. A number of hotels and theatres were also built in this central area and large department stores, such as Foy & Gibson and Sandover established along the tram route and the shopping strip along Hay Street. Shopping arcades and passageways were also developed in this period, allowing people to move with ease through the increasingly busy Perth streets and providing spaces for additional commercial premises outlets within the narrow blocks.

== List of lanes ==
Eight lanes were documented by the City of Perth. The number with which a lane is denoted in the figure above is shown below in brackets after the name of the lane.

- Grand Lane (6) (Note: Adjacent to the site of the former Grand Theatre.)
- Howard Lane (34)
- McLean Lane (8)
- Mercantile Lane (33)
- Munster Lane (14)
- Prince Lane (4)
- Shafto Lane (12)
- Wolf Lane (15)

== List of private places ==
The following may be found in the city centre.

- 140 (comprising Globe, Mitchell and Railway lanes)
- 160 Central
- Arcade 800
- Bon Marché Arcade
- Brookfield Place
- Carillon Arcade
- City Arcade (Note: Note that some of the National Library of Australia's online database headings, referring to the early stages of development of arcades in Perth, use this generic title.)
- Cloisters Arcade
- Cremorne Arcade
- Enex100
- Gledden Arcade
- London Court
- McNess Royal Arcade
- Piccadilly Arcade
- Plaza Arcade
- Raine Square
- St Martin's Arcade
- Trinity Arcade
- Wesley Quarter (a.k.a. Wesley Arcade)

=== Historic ===
Arcades no longer extant are:

- Baird's Arcade (demolished 2003)
- Central Arcade (demolished 1923 to create Forrest Place)
- Padbury Arcade (demolished 1987 to create Forrest Chase) (Note: Padbury Building tended to be known as Padburys Buildings in its time.)
- Terrace Arcade (demolished 1981 to create the R&I Bank Tower)
- Wanamba Arcade (closed 1980)
- Zimpels Arcade (closed)

== List of pedestrian malls ==
Pedestrian malls in the city centre and adjoining Perth Cultural Centre are:

- Forrest Place
- Hay Street Mall
- James Street Mall
- Murray Street Mall

== See also ==
- Colonial Town Plans of Perth
- Lanes and arcades of Melbourne
