= List of acts of the Parliament of Victoria from 1928 =

This is a list of acts of the Parliament of Victoria, Australia for the year 1928.

== 1928 ==
Short title, or popular name	Citation	Royal assent
Long title
	19 Geo. V. No. 3579	5 July 1928
An Act to apply out of the Consolidated Revenue the sum of Three million and forty thousand eight hundred and twenty-two pounds to the service of the year One thousand nine hundred and twenty-eight and One thousand nine hundred and twenty-nine.
	19 Geo. V. No. 3580	19 July 1928
An Act to apply out of the Consolidated Revenue the sum of Two hundred and forty-three thousand five hundred and twelve pounds to the service of the year One thousand nine hundred and twenty-seven and One thousand nine hundred and twenty-eight.
Local Government (Borrowing Powers) Act 1928	19 Geo. V. No. 3581	3 August 1928
An Act to authorize Councils of Municipalities to borrow Money upon the Credit hereof by the Issue of Debentures for the purpose of defraying the Cost and Expenses of Works under Section Five hundred and thirty-four of the Local Government Act 1915. (Note: Local Government Act 1915 (6 Geo. V. No. 2686))
Water Supply Loans Application Act 1928	19 Geo. V. No. 3582	3 August 1928
An Act to sanction the Issue and Application of certain Sums of Money available under Loan Acts for Irrigation Works Water Supply Works Drainage and Flood Protection Works in Country Districts and for Works under the River Murray Waters Acts and for other purposes.
Race-course-road Tramway Construction Act 1928	19 Geo. V. No. 3583	21 August 1928
An Act to authorize the Construction by the Melbourne and Metropolitan Tramways Board of an Electric Tramway in Race-course-road, Melbourne.
	19 Geo. V. No. 3584	6 September 1928
An Act to apply out of the Consolidated Revenue the sum of One million five hundred and ninety-two thousand eight hundred and forty-three pounds to the service of the year One thousand nine hundred and twenty-eight and One thousand nine hundred and twenty-nine.
Phillip Island Shire Act 1928	19 Geo. V. No. 3585	11 September 1928
An Act to provide for the Constitution under the Local Government Acts of the Shire of Phillip Island and for the Annexation thereto of French Island (Note: French Island, Victoria.) and for other purposes.
Williamstown Temperance Hall Act 1928	19 Geo. V. No. 3586	18 September 1928
An Act to revoke in part the Reservation of certain Land in the City of Williamstown permanently reserved as a Site for a Temperance Hall to revoke the Crown Grant of the whole of such Land and to provide for the Issue of a Crown Grant to certain Trustees of Portion thereof and for the Sale by Public Auction of the remaining Portion thereof and for other purposes.
Midwives Act 1928 (Note: Two acts were passed with the short title 'Midwives Act 1928', act No. 3587 in 1918 and act No. 3734 in 1919.) (repealed)	19 Geo. V. No. 3587	
(Repealed by Midwives Act 1928 (19 Geo. V. No. 3734))
	19 Geo. V. No. 3588	4 October 1928
An Act to apply out of the Consolidated Revenue the sum of One million five hundred and forty-four thousand nine hundred and fifty-six pounds to the service of the year One thousand nine hundred and twenty-eight and One thousand nine hundred and twenty-nine.
Dandenong Lands Act 1928	19 Geo. V. No. 3589	12 October 1928
An Act to authorize the Use of certain Land in the Township of Dandenong for Market and Recreation purposes.
Local Government Act 1928 (Note: Three acts were passed with the short title 'Marriage Act 1928', act No. 3590 and act No. 3595 in 1918, and act No. 3720 in 1919.) (repealed)	19 Geo. V. No. 3590	
(Repealed by Local Government Act 1928 (19 Geo. V. No. 3720))
	19 Geo. V. No. 3591	
	19 Geo. V. No. 3592	
Geelong Land (Melbourne Road) Act 1928	19 Geo. V. No. 3593	26 October 1928
An Act to divest out of The Geelong Harbor Trust Commissioners certain Land vested in the said Commissioners and to declare such Land to form part of the Public Highway known as the Melbourne Road.
Oakleigh Land Act 1928	19 Geo. V. No. 3594	31 October 1928
An Act to revoke in part the Reservation of certain Land in the City of Oakleigh permanently reserved as a Site for a Cemetery and to provide for the Reservation of Portion as a Site for Public Gardens and Portion as a Site for a Baby Health Centre.
Local Government Act 1928 (repealed)	19 Geo. V. No. 3595	
(Repealed by Local Government Act 1928 (19 Geo. V. No. 3720))
	19 Geo. V. No. 3596	1 November 1928
An Act to apply out of the Consolidated Revenue the sum of One million four hundred and ninety-seven thousand seven hundred and ninety-three pounds to the service of the year One thousand nine hundred and twenty-eight and One thousand nine hundred and twenty-nine.
	19 Geo. V. No. 3597	
Victorian Government Loan Act 1928	19 Geo. V. No. 3598	20 November 1928
An Act to authorize the raising of Money for Railways and for Irrigation Works and Water Supply and for the purposes of Works and Undertakings of the State Electricity Commission of Victoria.
	19 Geo. V. No. 3599	
Explosive Substances Act 1928 (repealed)	19 Geo. V. No. 3600	5 December 1928
An Act to amend the Law relating to Explosive Substances. (Repealed by Crimes Act 1928 (19 Geo. V. No. 3664))
	19 Geo. V. No. 3601	6 December 1928
An Act to apply out of the Consolidated Revenue the sum of One million five hundred and sixty-one thousand eight hundred and five pounds to the service of the year One thousand nine hundred and twenty-eight and One thousand nine hundred and twenty-nine.
Melbourne and Metropolitan Tramways Board Act 1928	19 Geo. V. No. 3602	18 December 1928
An Act relating to the Melbourne and Metropolitan Tramways Board.
Railway Loan Application Act 1928	19 Geo. V. No. 3603	18 December 1928
An Act to sanction the Issue and Application of certain Sums of Money available under Loan Acts for Railways and for other purposes.
	19 Geo. V. No. 3604	
Adoption of Children Act 1928	19 Geo. V. No. 3605	27 December 1928
An Act to make provision for the Adoption of Infants.
Electricity Supply Loans Application Act 1928	19 Geo. V. No. 3606	27 December 1928
An Act to sanction the Issue and Application of certain Sums of Money available under Loan Acts for Works and Undertakings of the State Electricity Commission of Victoria.
Victorian Loan (Public Works) Act 1928	19 Geo. V. No. 3607	27 December 1928
An Act to authorize the raisin of Money for Public Works and other purposes and to sanction the Issue and Application of such Money.
Melbourne and Metropolitan Board of Works (Borrowing Powers) Act 1928	19 Geo. V. No. 3608	27 December 1928
An Act to increase the Borrowing Powers of the Melbourne and Metropolitan Board of Works.
Victorian Loan (Country Sewerage) Act 1928	19 Geo. V. No. 3609	27 December 1928
An Act to authorize the raising of Money for Sewerage Works in Country Districts and to sanction the Issue and Application of such Money.
Municipal Endowment Application Act 1928	19 Geo. V. No. 3610	27 December 1928
An Act relating to Municipal Endowment.
Agricultural Education Acts Amendment Act 1928	19 Geo. V. No. 3611	27 December 1928
An Act relating to Agricultural Education.
Darling to Glen Waverley Railway Construction Act 1928	19 Geo. V. No. 3612	27 December 1928
An Act to amend the Darling to Glen Waverley Railway Construction Act 1926 (Note: Darling to Glen Waverley Railway Construction Act 1926 (17 Geo. V. No. 3500)) and for other purposes.
Petrol Pumps Act 1928	19 Geo. V. No. 3613	27 December 1928
An Act relating to Petrol Pumps.
State Savings Bank Act Amendment Act 1928	19 Geo. V. No. 3614	27 December 1928
An Act to further amend Section Eighty-two of the State Savings Bank Act 1915. (Note: State Savings Bank Act 1915 (6 Geo. V. No. 2729))
Harbor Roads Act 1927 Amendment Act 1928	19 Geo. V. No. 3615	27 December 1928
An Act to make a Correction in and to amend the Harbor Boards Act 1927. (Note: Harbor Boards Act 1927 (18 Geo. V. No. 3560))
Metropolitan Town Planning Commission Act 1928	19 Geo. V. No. 3616	27 December 1928
An Act to amend and to extend the Operation of the Metropolitan Town Planning Commission Acts.
Railway Lands Acquisition Acts Amendment Act 1928	19 Geo. V. No. 3617	27 December 1928
An Act to amend sections forty-one and sixty-eight of the Railway Lands Acquisition Act 1915. (Note: Railway Lands Acquisition Act 1915 (6 Geo. V. No. 2715))
Malvern War Memorial Fund Act 1928 (repealed)	19 Geo. V. No. 3618	27 December 1928
An Act to incorporate a Body by the Name of the Malvern War Memorial Trust and to authorize such Trust to administer the Malvern Returned Sailors and Soldiers Imperial League of Australia, Memorial Hall Fund in accordance with a certain Deed of Trust. (Repealed by Statute Law Revision Act 1995 (No. 11 of 1995))
Justices Act 1928 (Note: Two acts were passed with the short title 'Justices Act 1928', act No. 3619 in 1918 and act No. 3708 in 1919.) (repealed)	19 Geo. V. No. 3619	
(Repealed by Justices Act 1928 (19 Geo. V. No. 3708))
Marriage Act 1928 (Note: Two acts were passed with the short title 'Marriage Act 1928', act No. 3620 in 1918 and act No. 3726 in 1919.) (repealed)	19 Geo. V. No. 3620	
(Repealed by Marriage Act 1928 (19 Geo. V. No. 3726))

== Sources ==
- "1928 Victorian Historical Acts". AustLII.
