= 140 William Street =

140 William Street may refer to:

- 140 William Street, Melbourne
- 140 William Street, Perth
