= Allan Green Conservatory =

Greenhouse formerly on Perth Esplanade

Coordinates: 31°57′24″S 115°51′23″E

Designations

Western Australia Heritage Register
- Official name: Esplanade Reserve
- Type: State Registered Place
- Designated: 17 October 2003
- Reference no.: 3850

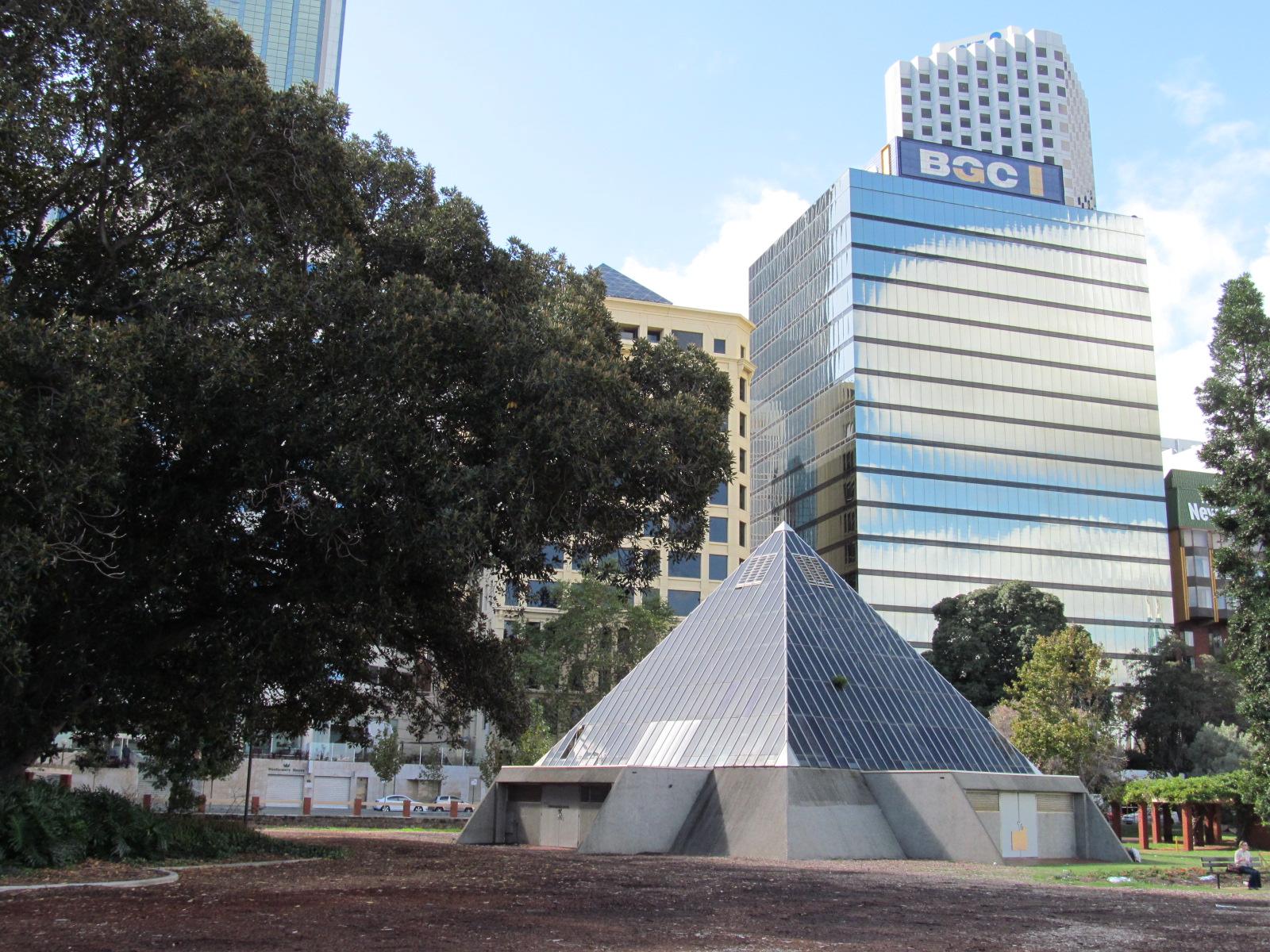
Allan Green Conservatory

The Allan Green Conservatory was a pyramid shaped botanical display facility on the Esplanade Reserve in Perth, Western Australia.

It was built in 1979 as part of the state's 150th anniversary celebrations and was designed to provide a public display of exotic tropical plants and rare palms not normally seen in Perth. It included internal elevated pathways.

It was named after William Allan McInnes Green, town clerk and chief executive officer of the City of Perth for many years.

Patronage to the conservatory declined from about 1996, and in 2006 the City of Perth closed the facility while considering redeveloping the facility for café/restaurant use. After investigating its commercial options, the City decided to close the facility indefinitely in light of the State Government's planned developments on the Esplanade Reserve. The conservatory was demolished in June 2012 as part of the Elizabeth Quay project, in which it and other heritage elements are proposed to be memorialised by signage.
