= List of acts of the Parliament of Victoria from 1929 =

This is a list of acts of the Parliament of Victoria, Australia for the year 1929.

== 1929 ==
Short title, or popular name	Citation	Royal assent
Long title
	19 Geo. V. No. 3621	2 January 1929
An Act to apply a sum out of the Consolidated Revenue to the service of the year ending on the thirtieth day of June One thousand nine hundred and twenty-nine and to appropriate the Supplies granted in this Session of Parliament.
Closer Settlement Acts Amendment Act 1928 (Note: Although given a short title ending '...Act 1928', this act was passed in the year 1929.)	19 Geo. V. No. 3622	2 January 1929
An Act to amend the Closer Settlement Acts and the Discharged Soldiers Settlement Acts and for other purposes.
Great Ocean Road Lands Act 1928 (repealed)	19 Geo. V. No. 3623	2 January 1929
An Act relating to the Sale of certain Crown Lands in the County of Polwarth for the purposes of the Construction of a Highway known as the Great Ocean Road. (Repealed by Statute Law Revision Act 1984 (No. 10087))
Geelong (Harbor Trust) Land Act 1928	19 Geo. V. No. 3624	2 January 1929
An Act to provide for the Reservation for the Recreation Convenience and Amusement of the People of certain Land vested in The Geelong Harbor Trust Commissioners.
	19 Geo. V. No. 3625	2 January 1929
An Act to relieve certain Municipalities from certain Payments in respect of certain Permanent Works carried out under the Country Roads Acts in the Shire of Wodonga.
Land Acts Amendment Act 1928	19 Geo. V. No. 3626	2 January 1929
An Act to amend Section Five of the Land Act 1923. (Note: Land Act 1923 (14 Geo. V. No. 3302))
Black Rock to Beaumaris Electric Street Railway Act 1928	19 Geo. V. No. 3627	2 January 1929
An Act to amend the Black Rock to Beaumaris Electric Street Railway Acts.
Public Accounts Committee Act 1928	19 Geo. V. No. 3628	2 January 1929
An Act to amend the Public Accounts Committee Act 1922. (Note: Public Accounts Committee Act 1922 (13 Geo. V. No. 3246))
Acts Enumeration and Revision Act 1928	19 Geo. V. No. 3629	12 February 1929
An Act to enumerate the Consolidating Acts of the Legislature of Victoria passed in the year One thousand nine hundred and twenty-eight and to state the effect of and rules of construction applicable to such Acts and to provide that certain enactments of the Legislature of New South Wales and of the Legislature of Victoria passed before the first of January One thousand nine hundred and twenty-eight shall be repealed and to enumerate the Unrepealed and Unconsolidated Enactments of such Legislatures.
Acts Interpretation Act 1928	19 Geo. V. No. 3630	12 February 1929
An Act to consolidate the Law relating to the Interpretation of Legislative Enactments and for Shortening the Language used therein.
Aborigines Act 1928	19 Geo. V. No. 3631	12 February 1929
An Act to consolidate the Law relating to the Aboriginal Natives of Victoria.
Administration and Probate Act 1928	19 Geo. V. No. 3632	12 February 1929
An Act to consolidate and amend the Law relating to the Administration of the Estates of Deceased Persons.
Agent-General's Act 1928 (repealed)	19 Geo. V. No. 3633	12 February 1929
An Act to consolidate the Law relating to the Agent-General for Victoria. (Repealed by Agent-General's Act 1945 (No. 5067))
Agricultural Colleges Act 1928	19 Geo. V. No. 3634	12 February 1929
An Act to consolidate the Law relating to Colleges of Agriculture.
Anzac Day Act 1928	19 Geo. V. No. 3635	12 February 1929
An Act to consolidate the Law constituting Anzac Day a public and Bank Holiday and for other purposes.
Apprenticeship Act 1928	19 Geo. V. No. 3636	12 February 1929
An Act to consolidate the Law relating to Apprenticeship.
Arbitration Act 1928	19 Geo. V. No. 3637	12 February 1929
An Act to consolidate the Law relating to Arbitration.
Architects Act 1928	19 Geo. V. No. 3638	12 February 1929
An Act to consolidate the Law relating to the Registration of Architects.
Auction Sales Act 1928	19 Geo. V. No. 3639	12 February 1929
An Act to consolidate the Law relating to Sales by Auction and Auctioneers.
Audit Act 1928	19 Geo. V. No. 3640	12 February 1929
An Act to consolidate the Law for the Collection and Payment of the Public Moneys the Audit of the Public Accounts and the Protection and Recovery of the Public Property.
Bakers and Millers Act 1928	19 Geo. V. No. 3641	12 February 1929
An Act to consolidate the Law relating to Bakers and Millers.
Banks and Currency Act 1928	19 Geo. V. No. 3642	12 February 1929
An Act to consolidate the Law relating to Banks and the Currency.
Bees Act 1928	19 Geo. V. No. 3643	12 February 1929
An Act to consolidate the Law relating to Diseases of Bees.
Beet Sugar Works Act 1928	19 Geo. V. No. 3644	12 February 1929
An Act to consolidate the Law relating to the Sugar Beet Industry in Victoria.
Boilers Inspection Act 1928	19 Geo. V. No. 3645	12 February 1929
An Act to consolidate the Law relating to the Inspection and Regulation of Boilers.
Brands Act 1928 (repealed)	19 Geo. V. No. 3646	12 February 1929
An Act to consolidate the Law relating to the Branding and Ear-marking of Stock. (Repealed by Agriculture Acts (Repeal) Act 1980 (No. 9456))
Building Societies Act 1928	19 Geo. V. No. 3647	12 February 1929
An Act to consolidate the Law relating to Building Societies.
Business Names Act 1928	19 Geo. V. No. 3648	12 February 1929
An Act to consolidate the Law relating to the Registration of Firms and Persons carrying on Business under Business Names and relating to the Names Styles Titles or Designations under which Businesses are carried on.
Carriages Act 1928	19 Geo. V. No. 3649	12 February 1929
An Act to consolidate the -Law relating to Licensed Carriages.
Carriers and Innkeepers Act 1928	19 Geo. V. No. 3650	12 February 1929
An Act to consolidate the Law relating to Carriers Innkeepers and others.
Cattle Compensation Act 1928	19 Geo. V. No. 3651	12 February 1929
An Act to consolidate the Law relating to the provision Compensation for the Owners of certain Cattle and for other purposes.
Cemeteries Act 1928	19 Geo. V. No. 3652	12 February 1929
An Act to consolidate the Law relating to Cemeteries and Cremation.
Children's Court Act 1928	19 Geo. V. No. 3653	12 February 1929
An Act to consolidate the Law relating to Children's Courts.
Children's Welfare Act 1928	19 Geo. V. No. 3654	12 February 1929
An Act to consolidate the Law relating to Children's Welfare and to the Protection of Infant Life.
Chinese Act 1928	19 Geo. V. No. 3655	12 February 1929
An Act to consolidate the Law relating to Chinese Residents.
Closer Setttlement Act 1928	19 Geo. V. No. 3656	12 February 1929
An Act to consolidate the Law relating to the Acquisition and Disposal of Land for the purposes of Closer Settlement and relating to the Settlement of Discharged Soldiers on Land and for other purposes.
Coal Mines Regulation Act 1928	19 Geo. V. No. 3657	12 February 1929
An Act to consolidate the Law relating to the Regulation of Coal Mines.
Commonwealth Arrangements Act 1928	19 Geo. V. No. 3658	12 February 1929
An Act to consolidate the Law providing for certain matters in Victoria in connexion with the Commonwealth.
Companies Act 1928	19 Geo. V. No. 3659	12 February 1929
An Act to consolidate the Law relating to Companies.
Constitution Act Amendment Act 1928 (repealed)	19 Geo. V. No. 3660	12 February 1929
An Act to consolidate the Law relating to the Amendment of the Constitution. (Repealed by Constitution Act Amendment Act 1956 (No. 6006))
Coroners Act 1928	19 Geo. V. No. 3661	12 February 1929
An Act to consolidate the Law relating to Coroners.
Country Roads Act 1928	19 Geo. V. No. 3662	12 February 1929
An Act to consolidate the Law relating to Country Roads.
County Court Act 1928	19 Geo. V. No. 3663	12 February 1929
An Act to consolidate and amend the Law relating to County Courts.
Crimes Act 1928	19 Geo. V. No. 3664	12 February 1929
An Act to consolidate the Law relating to Crimes and Criminal Offenders.
Crown Remedies and Liability Act 1928	19 Geo. V. No. 3665	12 February 1929
An Act to consolidate the Law relating to the Protection and Recovery of Crown Property and the enforcement of Claims against the Crown.
Developmental Railways Act 1928	19 Geo. V. No. 3666	12 February 1929
An Act to consolidate the Law relating to Developmental Railways in Country Districts.
Dog Act 1928	19 Geo. V. No. 3667	12 February 1929
An Act to consolidate the Law relating to Dogs.
Drainage Areas Act 1928	19 Geo. V. No. 3668	12 February 1929
An Act to consolidate the Law relating to the Drainage of Land in Drainage Areas.
Drainage of Land Act 1928	19 Geo. V. No. 3669	12 February 1929
An Act to consolidate the Law relating to the Drainage of Land for Agricultural and other purposes.
Dried Fruits Act 1928 (repealed)	19 Geo. V. No. 3670	12 February 1929
An Act to consolidate the Law relating to Dried Fruits and Dried Fruits Packing Sheds and for other purposes. (Repealed by Dried Fruits Act 1938 (No. 4594))
Education Act 1928	19 Geo. V. No. 3671	12 February 1929
An Act to consolidate the Law relating to Education.
Electric Light and Power Act 1928	19 Geo. V. No. 3672	12 February 1929
An Act to consolidate the Law relating to the supply of Electricity for Lighting and for other purposes.
Employers and Employés Act 1928 or the Employers and Employees Act 1928 (repealed)	19 Geo. V. No. 3673	12 February 1929
An Act to consolidate the Law relating to Employers and Employés. (Repealed by Employers and Employés Act 1958 (No. 6242))
Evidence Act 1928	19 Geo. V. No. 3674	12 February 1929
An Act to consolidate the Law of Evidence.
Explosives Act 1928	19 Geo. V. No. 3675	12 February 1929
An Act to consolidate the Law relating to the Importation Carriage Storage Manufacture and Sale of Explosives.
Export Products Act 1928	19 Geo. V. No. 3676	12 February 1929
An Act to consolidate the Law providing for the Inspection of Live Stock, Meat, Dairy Produce, Fruit, and other products intended for Export and regulating the Exportation thereof.
Factories and Shops Act 1928	19 Geo. V. No. 3677	12 February 1929
An Act to consolidate the Law relating to the Supervision and Regulation of Factories and Shops and to other Industrial Matters.
Farm Products Agents Act 1928	19 Geo. V. No. 3678	12 February 1929
An Act to consolidate the Law relating to the Licensing of Farm Produce Agents and purposes incidental thereto.
Fences Act 1928	19 Geo. V. No. 3679	12 February 1929
An Act to consolidate the Law relating to Dividing and Vermin-proof Fences.
Fertilizers Act 1928	19 Geo. V. No. 3680	12 February 1929
An Act to consolidate the Law. relating to the Sale of Fertilizers.
Firearms Act 1928	19 Geo. V. No. 3681	12 February 1929
An Act to consolidate the Law relating to Firearms and other Weapons and for other purposes.
Fire Brigades Act 1928	19 Geo. V. No. 3682	12 February 1929
An Act to consolidate the Law relating to the Protection of Life and Property from Fire and for other purposes.
Fisheries Act 1928	19 Geo. V. No. 3683	12 February 1929
An Act to consolidate the Law relating to Fisheries.
Footwear Regulation Act 1928	19 Geo. V. No. 3684	12 February 1929
An Act to consolidate the Law regulating the Manufacture and Sale of Footwear and for other purposes.
Forests Act 1928	19 Geo. V. No. 3685	12 February 1929
An Act to consolidate the Law for the Management and Protection of State Forests.
Friendly Societies Act 1928	19 Geo. V. No. 3686	12 February 1929
An Act to consolidate the Law relating to Friendly Societies.
Fruit and Vegetables Act 1928	19 Geo. V. No. 3687	12 February 1929
An Act to consolidate the Law relating to Cool Stores for Fruit and the Packing and Sale of Fruit and Vegetables.
Fungicides Act 1928	19 Geo. V. No. 3688	12 February 1929
An Act to consolidate the Law regulating the Sale of Fungicides, Insecticides, Vermin Destroyers, and Weed Destroyers, and for other purposes.
Game Act 1928	19 Geo. V. No. 3689	12 February 1929
An Act to consolidate the Law relating to the Protection of Game.
Gaols Act 1928	19 Geo. V. No. 3690	12 February 1929
An Act to consolidate the Law relating to Gaols.
Geelong Harbor Trust Act 1928	19 Geo. V. No. 3691	12 February 1929
An Act to consolidate the Law relating to the Geelong Harbor Trust.
Geelong Waterworks and Sewerage Act 1928	19 Geo. V. No. 3692	12 February 1929
An Act to consolidate the Law relating to Geelong Waterworks and Sewerage.
Gold Buyers Act 1928	19 Geo. V. No. 3693	12 February 1929
An Act to consolidate the Law relating to Gold Buyers and Assayers and for other purposes.
Goods Act 1928	19 Geo. V. No. 3694	12 February 1929
An Act to consolidate the Law relating to Dealings in Goods.
Harbor Boards Act 1928	19 Geo. V. No. 3695	12 February 1929
An Act to consolidate the Law relating to Harbor Boards for certain Ports.
Hawkers and Pedlers Act 1928	19 Geo. V. No. 3696	12 February 1929
An Act to consolidate the Law relating to Hawkers and Pedlers.
Health Act 1928	19 Geo. V. No. 3697	12 February 1929
An Act to consolidate the Law relating to Public Health.
Horse Breeding Act 1928	19 Geo. V. No. 3698	12 February 1929
An Act to consolidate the Law regulating the use of Stallions for Stud Purposes.
Hospitals and Charities Act 1928	19 Geo. V. No. 3699	12 February 1929
An Act to consolidate the Law relating to Hospitals and Charities.
Imprisonment of Fraudulent Debtors Act 1928	19 Geo. V. No. 3700	12 February 1929
An Act to consolidate the Law relating to the Imprisonment of Fraudulent Debtors.
Income Tax Act 1928	19 Geo. V. No. 3701	12 February 1929
An Act to consolidate the Law relating to the Imposition of Income Tax.
Industrial and Provident Societies Act 1928	19 Geo. V. No. 3702	12 February 1929
An Act to consolidate the Law relating to Industrial and Provident Societies.
Inebriates Act 1928	19 Geo. V. No. 3703	12 February 1929
An Act to consolidate the Law providing for the Care, Control, and Treatment of Inebriates.
Infectious Diseases Hospital Act 1928	19 Geo. V. No. 3704	12 February 1929
An Act to consolidate the Law relating to the Queen's Memorial Infectious Diseases Hospital at Fairfield.
Insolvency Act 1928 (repealed)	19 Geo. V. No. 3705	12 February 1929
An Act to consolidate the Law relating to Insolvency. (Repealed by Public Account (Trust Funds) Act 1982 (No. 9861))
Instruments Act 1928	19 Geo. V. No. 3706	12 February 1929
An Act to consolidate the Law relating to Instruments and Securities.
Juries Act 1928	19 Geo. V. No. 3707	12 February 1929
An Act to consolidate the Law relating to Juries.
Justices Act 1928 (Note: Two acts were passed with the short title 'Justices Act 1928', act No. 3619 in 1918 and act No. 3708 in 1919.)	19 Geo. V. No. 3708	12 February 1929
An Act to consolidate the Law relating to Justices of the Peace and Courts of General and Petty Sessions.
Land Act 1928	19 Geo. V. No. 3709	12 February 1929
An Act to consolidate the Law relating to the Sale and Occupation of Crown Lands.
Landlord and Tenant Act 1928	19 Geo. V. No. 3710	12 February 1929
An Act to consolidate the Law relating to Landlord and Tenant.
Lands Compensation Act 1928	19 Geo. V. No. 3711	12 February 1929
An Act to consolidate the Law relating to the Mode of Procedure in taking and determining the Compensation to be paid for Lands required by the State for Public Works.
Land Surveyors Act 1928	19 Geo. V. No. 3712	12 February 1929
An Act to consolidate the Law regulating the Licensing of Surveyors and for other purposes.
Land Tax Act 1928	19 Geo. V. No. 3713	12 February 1929
An Act to consolidate the Law providing for a Tax on the Unimproved Value of Land and for the Assessment of Land and other purposes.
Law Institute Act 1928	19 Geo. V. No. 3714	12 February 1929
An Act to consolidate the Law relating to the Law Institute of Victoria and for other purposes.
Legal Profession Practice Act 1928	19 Geo. V. No. 3715	12 February 1929
An Act to consolidate the Law regulating the Practice of the Legal Profession.
Libraries Act 1928	19 Geo. V. No. 3716	12 February 1929
An Act to consolidate the Laws relating to Libraries.
Licensing Act 1928	19 Geo. V. No. 3717	12 February 1929
An Act to consolidate the Law relating to the Licensing of Public Houses and the Sale of Fermented and Spirituous Liquors.
Lifts Regulation Act 1928	19 Geo. V. No. 3718	12 February 1929
An Act to consolidate the Law regulating the use of Passenger and other Lifts.
Livery and Agistment Act 1928	19 Geo. V. No. 3719	12 February 1929
An Act to consolidate the Law for the better Protection of Livery-stable Keepers and Agisters of Cattle, and for other purposes.
Local Government Act 1928 (Note: Three acts were passed with the short title 'Marriage Act 1928', act No. 3590 and act No. 3595 in 1918, and act No. 3720 in 1919.) (repealed)	19 Geo. V. No. 3720	12 February 1929
An Act to consolidate the Law relating to Local Government. (Repealed by Local Government Act 1946 (No. 5203)
Lunacy Act 1928	19 Geo. V. No. 3721	12 February 1929
An Act to consolidate the Law relating to the Insane.
Maintenance Act 1928	19 Geo. V. No. 3722	12 February 1929
An Act to consolidate the Law relating to the Maintenance of Destitute or Deserted Wives and Children and others and relating to Confinement Expenses and relating to the Relief of Persons whose Relatives liable to support them reside in another State of the Commonwealth or in the Dominion of New Zealand, and to facilitate the Enforcement in Victoria of Maintenance Orders made in England and Northern Ireland and other parts of His Majesty's Dominions and Protectorates and vice versa, and for other purposes.
Marine Act 1928	19 Geo. V. No. 3723	12 February 1929
An Act to consolidate the Law relating to Passengers Harbors and Navigation.
Marine Stores and Old Metals Act 1928	19 Geo. V. No. 3724	12 February 1929
An Act to consolidate the Law relating to Collectors of and Dealers in Special Wares Marine Stores and Old Metals.
Markets Act 1928	19 Geo. V. No. 3725	12 February 1929
An Act to consolidate the Law relating to Markets.
Marriage Act 1928 (Note: Two acts were passed with the short title 'Marriage Act 1928', act No. 3620 in 1918 and act No. 3726 in 1919.)	19 Geo. V. No. 3726	12 February 1929
An Act to consolidate the Law relating to Marriage and to Divorce and Matrimonial Causes and to Guardianship and Custody of Infants.
Married Women's Property Act 1928	19 Geo. V. No. 3727	12 February 1929
An Act to consolidate the Law relating to the Property of Married Women.
Masseurs Act 1928	19 Geo. V. No. 3728	12 February 1929
An Act to consolidate the Law making provision with respect to the Training Qualifications and Registration of Masseurs and for other purposes.
Master and Apprentice Act 1928	19 Geo. V. No. 3729	12 February 1929
An Act to consolidate the Law relating to Masters and Apprentices.
Medical Act 1928	19 Geo. V. No. 3730	12 February 1929
An Act to consolidate the Law relating to Medical Practitioners Dentists and Chemists and to the adoption of the British Pharmacopœia.
Melbourne and Metropolitan Board of Works Act 1928	19 Geo. V. No. 3731	12 February 1929
An Act to consolidate the Law relating to the Melbourne and Metropolitan Board of Works.
Melbourne and Metropolitan Tramways Act 1928	19 Geo. V. No. 3732	12 February 1929
An Act to consolidate the Law relating to Metropolitan Tramways.
Melbourne Harbor Trust Act 1928	19 Geo. V. No. 3733	12 February 1929
An Act to consolidate the Law providing for the Regulation Management and Improvement of the Port of Melbourne and certain portions of the River Yarra Yarra and certain portions of the Maribyrnong River and for other purposes connected therewith.
Midwives Act 1928 (Note: Two acts were passed with the short title 'Midwives Act 1928', act No. 3587 in 1918 and act No. 3734 in 1919.)	19 Geo. V. No. 3734	12 February 1929
An Act to consolidate the Law providing for the Registration and Better Training of Midwives and regulating their Practice.
Mildura Irrigation and Water Trusts Act 1928	19 Geo. V. No. 3735	12 February 1929
An Act to consolidate the Law relating to Irrigation and Water Trusts within the Irrigation Settlement of Mildura.
Milk and Dairy Supervision Act 1928	19 Geo. V. No.	12 February 1929
An Act to consolidate the Law regulating the Production Testing Grading and Sale of Milk and Dairy Produce and the Manufacture of Dairy Produce and for other purposes.
Mines Act 1928	19 Geo. V. No. 3737	12 February 1929
An Act to consolidate the Law relating to Mines.
Mining Development Act 1928	19 Geo. V. No. 3738	12 February 1929
An Act to consolidate the Law relating to Advances to Companies and Persons to further develop Mining and for other purposes.
Mint Act 1928	19 Geo. V. No. 3739	12 February 1929
An Act to consolidate the Law relating to the Maintenance in Victoria of a Branch of the Royal Mint.
Money Lenders Act 1928	19 Geo. V. No. 3740	12 February 1929
An Act to consolidate the Law with respect to persons carrying on Business as Money Lenders.
Motor Car Act 1928 (repealed)	19 Geo. V. No. 3741	12 February 1929
An Act to consolidate the Law regulating the use of Motor Cars. (Repealed by Motor Car Act 1951 (No. 5616))
Motor Omnibus Act 1928	19 Geo. V. No. 3742	12 February 1929
An Act to consolidate the Law making further provision with respect to Motor Omnibuses and for other purposes.
Municipal Endowment Act 1928	19 Geo. V. No. 3743	12 February 1929
An Act to consolidate the Law relating to Municipal Endowment.
Nurses Act 1928	19 Geo. V. No. 3744	12 February 1929
An Act to consolidate the Law making provision with respect to the Training Qualifications and Registration of Nurses and for other purposes.
Partnership Act 1928	19 Geo. V. No. 3745	12 February 1929
An Act to consolidate the Law relating to Partnership.
Pawnbrokers Act 1928	19 Geo. V. No. 3746	12 February 1929
An Act to consolidate the Law relating to Pawnbrokers.
Penalties Act 1928	19 Geo. V. No. 3747	12 February 1929
An Act to consolidate the Law relating to Penalties.
Poisons Act 1928	19 Geo. V. No. 3748	12 February 1929
An Act to consolidate the Law relating to the Sale and Use of Poisons and Poisonous and Narcotic Substances and Preparations and Potent Drugs.
Police Offences Act 1928	19 Geo. V. No. 3749	12 February 1929
An Act to consolidate the Law relating to Police Offences.
Police Regulation Act 1928	19 Geo. V. No. 3750	12 February 1929
An Act to consolidate the Law relating to the Police Force in Victoria.
Poor Persons Legal Assistance Act 1928	19 Geo. V. No. 3751	12 February 1929
An Act to consolidate the Law relating to the provision of Legal Assistance to Poor Persons.
Pounds Act 1928	19 Geo. V. No. 3752	12 February 1929
An Act to consolidate the Law relating to the Impounding of Cattle.
Printers and Newspapers Act 1928	19 Geo. V. No. 3753	12 February 1929
An Act to consolidate the Law relating to the preventing the Printing and Publishing of Books and Papers by Persons not known and to the Printing and Publishing of Newspapers.
Property Law Act 1928	19 Geo. V. No. 3754	12 February 1929
An Act to consolidate and amend the Law relating to Conveyancing and the Law of Property.
Public Contracts Act 1928	19 Geo. V. No. 3755	12 February 1929
An Act to consolidate the Law relating to the Purchase of Goods Machinery or Materials for Works undertaken by or on behalf of certain Local Authorities.
Public Safety Preservation Act 1928	19 Geo. V. No.	12 February 1929
An Act to consolidate the Law making provision for the Protection of the Community in Cases of Emergency.
Public Service Act 1928	19 Geo. V. No. 3757	12 February 1929
An Act to consolidate the Law relating to the Public Service of Victoria.
Public Works Act 1928	19 Geo. V. No. 3758	12 February 1929
An Act to consolidate the Law relating to Public Works.
Railways Act 1928	19 Geo. V. No. 3759	12 February 1929
An Act to consolidate the Law relating to Railways
Railway Lands Acquisition Act 1928	19 Geo. V. No. 3760	12 February 1929
An Act to consolidate the Law relating to the Acquisition of Lands required tor the Construction of Lines of Railway.
Railways Standing Committee Act 1928	19 Geo. V. No. 3761	12 February 1929
An Act to consolidate the Law relating to the Railways Standing Committee.
Real Estate Agents Act 1928	19 Geo. V. No. 3762	12 February 1929
An Act to consolidate the Law relating to the Licensing of Real Estate Agents.
Registrar-General's Fees Act 1928	19 Geo. V. No. 3763	12 February 1929
An Act to consolidate the Law relating to Fees payable in the Office of the Registrar-General.
Registration of Births Deaths and Marriages Act 1928 (repealed)	19 Geo. V. No. 3764	12 February 1929
An Act to consolidate the Law relating to the Registration of Births Deaths and Marriages. (Repealed by Registration of Births Deaths and Marriages Act 1958 (No. 6356))
Religious Successory and Charitable Trusts Act 1928	19 Geo. V. No. 3765	12 February 1929
An Act to; consolidate the Law relating to Religious Successory and Charitable Trusts.
Seamen's Act 1928	19 Geo. V. No. 3766	12 February 1929
An Act to consolidate the Law relating to Seamen.
Second-hand Dealers Act 1928	19 Geo. V. No. 3767	12 February 1929
An Act to consolidate the Law regulating the Sale and Purchase of Goods by Second-hand Dealers.
Seeds Act 1928	19 Geo. V. No. 3768	12 February 1929
An Act to consolidate the Law relating to Seeds.
Senate Elections (Times and Places) Act 1928	19 Geo. V. No. 3769	12 February 1929
An Act to consolidate the Law relating to the Election of Senators for Victoria to the Senate of the Commonwealth.
Servants' Registry Offices Act 1928	19 Geo. V. No. 3770	12 February 1929
An Act to consolidate the Law relating to the regulation of Servants' Registry Offices.
Settled Land Act 1928	19 Geo. V. No. 3771	12 February 1929
An Act to consolidate and amend the Law relating to Settled Land.
Sewerage Districts Act 1928	19 Geo. V. No. 3772	12 February 1929
An Act to consolidate the Law relating to Sewerage Districts and the Sewering, thereof.
Shearers' Hut Accommodation Act 1928	19 Geo. V. No. 3773	12 February 1929
An Act to consolidate the Law relating to Hut Accommodation for Shearers.
Sheep Dipping Act 1928	19 Geo. V. No. 3774	12 February 1929
An Act to consolidate the Law relating to the Compulsory Dipping of Sheep.
Stamps Act 1928	19 Geo. V. No. 3775	12 February 1929
An Act to consolidate the Law relating to Stamps.
State Electricity Commission Act 1928	19 Geo. V. No. 3776	12 February 1929
An Act to consolidate the Law relating to the State Electricity Commission and the Powers and Duties thereof.
State Savings Bank Act 1928	19 Geo. V. No. 3777	12 February 1929
An Act to consolidate the Law relating to the State Savings Bank of Victoria.
Statistics Act 1928	19 Geo. V. No.	12 February 1929
An Act to consolidate the Law relating to the Government Statist and to Statistics.
Stock Diseases Act 1928	19 Geo. V. No. 3779	12 February 1929
An Act to consolidate the Law relating to Diseases in Stock.
Stock Foods Act 1928	19 Geo. V. No. 3780	12 February 1929
An Act to consolidate the Law regulating the Sale of Chaff and other Foods for Stock.
Street Trading Act 1928	19 Geo. V. No. 3781	12 February 1929
An Act to consolidate the Law in certain cases and for regulating Street Trading in certain cases and for other purposes.
Superannuation Act 1928	19 Geo. V. No. 3782	12 February 1929
An Act to consolidate the Law making provision on Contributory Basis for Superannuation Benefits for certain Public Officers and Employés and Benefits for certain of their Dependants, and for other purposes.
Supreme Court Act 1928	19 Geo. V. No. 3783	12 February 1929
An Act to consolidate and amend the Law relating to the Supreme Court.
Swine Act 1928	19 Geo. V. No. 3784	12 February 1929
An Act to consolidate the Law relating to Compensation for the Owners of Pigs in certain cases and to prohibit the making of certain Charges or Deductions in connexion with the Sale of Swine.
Temperance Halls Act 1928	19 Geo. V. No. 3785	12 February 1929
An Act to consolidate the Law enabling Trustees of Temperance Halls to demise certain Lands for terms of years and to raise Loans on the Rents of such Lands and Buildings and for other purposes.
Theatres Act 1928	19 Geo. V. No. 3786	12 February 1929
An Act to consolidate the Law relating to Theatres and Censorship of Cinematograph Films.
Tobacco Sellers Act 1928	19 Geo. V. No. 3787	12 February 1929
An Act to consolidate the Law relating to Sellers of Tobacco Cigars Cigarettes and Snuff.
Trade Unions Act 1928	19 Geo. V. No. 3788	12 February 1929
An Act to consolidate the Law relating to Trade Unions.
Training Ships Act 1928	19 Geo. V. No. 3789	12 February 1929
An Act to consolidate the Law relating to Training Ships.
Tramways Act 1928	19 Geo. V. No. 3790	12 February 1929
An Act to consolidate the Law relating to Tramways.
Transfer of Land Act 1928	19 Geo. V. No. 3791	12 February 1929
An Act to consolidate the Law relating to the Simplification of the Title to and the Dealing with Estates in Land.
Trustee Act 1928	19 Geo. V. No. 3792	12 February 1929
An Act to consolidate and amend the Law relating to Trustees.
Trustee Companies Act 1928	19 Geo. V. No. 3793	12 February 1929
An Act to consolidate the Law relating to Trustee Companies.
Unauthorized Documents Act 1928	19 Geo. V. No. 3794	12 February 1929
An Act to consolidate the Law relating to the Unauthorized Use of the Royal or other Arms and to the Issue of False or Misleading Process and other Documents.
University Act 1928	19 Geo. V. No. 3795	12 February 1929
An Act to consolidate the Law relating to the University of Melbourne.
Unlawful Assemblies and Processions Act 1928	19 Geo. V. No. 3796	12 February 1929
An Act to consolidate the Law relating to Unlawful Assemblies and Processions Special Constables and Riotously Disturbed Districts.
Vegetation and Vine Diseases Act 1928	19 Geo. V. No. 3797	12 February 1929
An Act to consolidate the Law relating to Diseases of Vegetation and Vines.
Venereal Diseases Act 1928	19 Geo. V. No. 3798	12 February 1929
An Act to consolidate the Law relating to Venereal Diseases.
Vermin and Noxious Diseases Act 1928	19 Geo. V. No. 3799	12 February 1929
An Act to consolidate the Law relating to Vermin and Noxious Weeds.
Veterinary Surgeons Act 1928	19 Geo. V. No. 3800	12 February 1929
An Act to consolidate the Law relating to Veterinary Surgeons.
Water Act 1928	19 Geo. V. No. 3801	12 February 1929
An Act to consolidate the Law relating to the Conservation and Supply of Water and the Law relating to certain Rights in Natural Waters and the Property in the Beds and Banks containing the same.
Weights and Measures Act 1928	19 Geo. V. No. 3802	12 February 1929
An Act to consolidate the Law relating to Weights and Measures.
Wills Act 1928	19 Geo. V. No. 3803	12 February 1929
An Act to consolidate the Laws relating to Wills.
Wire Netting Act 1928	19 Geo. V. No. 3804	12 February 1929
An Act to consolidate the Law relating to the Supplying of Wire Netting.
Women's Qualifications Act 1928	19 Geo. V. No. 3805	12 February 1929
An Act to consolidate the Law with respect to Disqualifications on Account of Sex and for other purposes.
Workers' Compensation Act 1928	19 Geo. V. No. 3806	12 February 1928
An Act to consolidate the Law relating to Compensation to Workers for Injuries occurring in the Course of their Employment.
Wrongs Act 1928	19 Geo. V. No. 3807	12 February 1929
An Act to consolidate the Law relating to Wrongs.
	20 Geo. V. No. 3808	4 July 1929
An Act to apply out of the Consolidated Revenue the sum of Three million one hundred and thirty-three thousand five hundred and one pounds to the service of the year One thousand nine hundred and twenty-nine and One thousand nine hundred and thirty.
	20 Geo. V. No. 3809	29 July 1929
An Act to apply out of the Consolidated Revenue the sum of Two hundred and ninety-three thousand one hundred and fifty-three pounds to the service of the year One thousand nine hundred and twenty-eight and One thousand nine hundred and twenty-nine.
Bail Act 1929	20 Geo. V. No. 3810	26 August 1929
An Act relating to the taking of Bail on certain Days and for other purposes.
	20 Geo. V. No. 3811	9 September 1929
An Act to apply out of the Consolidated Revenue the sum of One million four hundred and ninety-eight thousand and seventy-one pounds to the service of the year One thousand nine hundred and twenty-nine and One thousand nine hundred and thirty.
Victorian Loan Act 1929	20 Geo. V. No. 3812	9 September 1929
An Act to authorize the raising of Money for Irrigation Works and Water Supply Works and for Drainage and Flood Protection Works in Country Districts and for Works under the River Murray Waters Acts.
Water Supply Loans Application Act 1929	20 Geo. V. No. 3813	9 September 1929
An Act to sanction the Issue nod Application of certain Sums of Money available under Loan Acts for Irrigation Works Water Supply Works Drainage and Flood Protection Works in Country Districts and for Works under the River Murray Waters Acts and for other purposes.
Judicial Proceedings (Regulation of Reports) Act 1929	20 Geo. V. No. 3814	16 September 1929
An Act to regulate the Publication of Reports of Judicial Proceedings in such a manner as to prevent Injury to Public Morals, and for other purposes.
Harbor Boards Act 1929	20 Geo. V. No. 3815	16 September 1929
An Act to amend Section Eighty-five of the Harbor Boards Act 1927. (Note: Harbor Boards Act 1927 (18 Geo. V. No. 3560))
Statute Law Revision Act 1929	20 Geo. V. No. 3816	10 October 1929
An Act to revise the Statute Law and for other purposes.
	20 Geo. V. No. 3817	10 October 1929
An Act to apply out of the Consolidated Revenue the sum of One million five hundred and sixty thousand five hundred and ninety-six pounds to the service of the year One thousand nine hundred and twenty-nine and One thousand nine hundred and thirty.
Police Offences (Race-meetings) Act 1929	20 Geo. V. No. 3818	31 October 1929
An Act to amend the Law relating to Race-courses and Race-meetings.
Cultivation Advances Act 1929	20 Geo. V. No. 3819	31 October 1929
An Act to enable Advances to be made on certain Terms to Cultivators of Land and for other purposes.
	20 Geo. V. No. 3820	31 October 1929
An Act to apply out of the Consolidated Revenue the sum of Two million one hundred and ten thousand four hundred and ninety pounds to the service of the year.One thousand nine hundred and twenty-nine and One thousand nine hundred and thirty.
	20 Geo. V. No. 3821	18 December 1929
An Act to apply out of the Consolidated Revenue the sum of One million five hundred and eleven thousand three hundred and twenty-four pounds to the service of the year One thousand nine hundred and twenty-nine and One thousand nine hundred and thirty.
Sessional Acts Revision Act 1929	20 Geo. V. No. 3822	18 December 1929
An Act to adapt certain References in Acts passed during the Third Session of the Twenty-ninth Parliament to the Provisions of the Consolidating Acts passed during the Second Session of the said Parliament and to revise the Language of certain Acts and for other purposes.
Municipal Endowment Act 1929	20 Geo. V. No. 3823	18 December 1929
An Act relating to Municipal Endowment.
Melbourne and Metropolitan Tramways Board Act 1929	20 Geo. V. No. 3824	24 December 1929
An Act relating to the Melbourne and Metropolitan Tramways Board.
Victorian Loan Act 1929 (No. 2)	20 Geo. V. No. 3825	30 December 1929
An Act to authorize the raising of Money for Railways and for the purposes of Works and Undertakings of the State Electricity Commission of Victoria.
State Electricity Commission (Ballarat and Bendigo Purchase) Act 1929	20 Geo. V. No. 3826	30 December 1929
An Act relating to the Purchase by the State Electricity Commission of Victoria of Undertakings at or near Ballarat and Bendigo of The Electric Supply Company of Victoria Limited and for other purposes.
Cultivation Advances Act 1929 (No. 2)	20 Geo. V. No. 3827	30 December 1929
An Act to enable Advances to be made on certain Terms to Cultivators of Land and for other purposes.
Victorian Loan (Public Works) Act 1929	20 Geo. V. No. 3828	30 December 1929
An Act to authorize the Raising of Money for Public Works and other purposes and to sanction the Issue and Application of such Money.
Apprenticeship Act 1929	20 Geo. V. No. 3829	30 December 1929
An Act to amend Sub-section (2) of Section Twenty-six of the Apprenticeship Act 1928. (Note: Apprenticeship Act 1928 (19 Geo. V. No. 3636))
Phillip Island Shire Act 1929	20 Geo. V. No. 3830	30 December 1929
An Act to amend the Phillip Island Shire Act 1928. (Note: Phillip Island Shire Act 1928 (19 Geo. V. No. 3585))
Electricity Supply Loans Application Act 1929	20 Geo. V. No. 3831	30 December 1929
An Act to sanction the Issue and Application of certain Sums of Money available under Loan Acts for Works and Undertakings of the State Electricity Commission of Victoria.
Licensing (Conduct of Poll) Act 1929	20 Geo. V. No. 3832	30 December 1929
An Act to amend Section Three hundred and four of the Licensing Act 1928. (Note: Licensing Act 1928 (19 Geo. V. No. 3717))
Melbourne and Metropolitan Board of Works Act 1929	20 Geo. V. No. 3833	30 December 1929
An Act relating to the Area of the Metropolis under the Melbourne and Metropolitan Board of Works Act 1928. (Note: Melbourne and Metropolitan Board of Works Act 1928 (19 Geo. V. No. 3731))
Metropolitan Town Planning Commission Act 1929	20 Geo. V. No. 3834	30 December 1929
An Act to amend and to extend the Operation of the Metropolitan Town Planning Commission Acts.
Railway Loan Application Act 1929	20 Geo. V. No. 3835	30 December 1929
An Act to sanction the Issue and Application of certain Sums of Money available under Loan Acts for Railways and for other purposes.
Developmental Railways Act 1929	20 Geo. V. No. 3836	30 December 1929
An Act to provide for the Transfer to the Consolidated Revenue of the Sum of One hundred thousand pounds out of The Developmental Railways Account.
Public Account Advances Act 1929	20 Geo. V. No. 3837	30 December 1929
An Act to authorize the Temporary Application out of The Public Account of certain Moneys to provide for the Payment of Interest payable out of the Discharged Soldiers Settlement Fund.
Coal Mines Regulation Act 1929	20 Geo. V. No. 3838	30 December 1929
An Act to provide for the Payment into the Consolidated Revenue of the Sum of Fifty thousand pounds out of the Net Surplus Profits of the State Coal Mine for the year ending on the thirtieth day of June One thousand nine hundred and thirty.
Transfer of Land (Assurance Fund) Act 1929	20 Geo. V. No. 3839	30 December 1929
An Act to provide for the Transfer to the Consolidated Revenue of the sum of Fifty thousand pounds out of the Assurance Fund under the Transfer of Land Act 1928. (Note: Transfer of Land Act 1928 (19 Geo. V. No. 3791))
Korumburra Land Exchange Act 1929	20 Geo. V. No. 3840	30 December 1929
An Act to provide for the Exchange of certain Crown Land in the Township of Korumburra temporarily reserved as a Site for a Public Park for certain other Land in the Parish of Korumburra and for other purposes.
Dried Fruits Act 1929 (repealed)	20 Geo. V. No. 3841	30 December 1929
An Act to amend Section Seventeen of the Dried Fruits Act 1928 (Note: Dried Fruits Act 1928 (19 Geo. V. No. 3670)) and to continue in force the Dried Fruits Acts. (Repealed by Dried Fruits Act 1938 (No. 4594))
Land Tax Act 1929	20 Geo. V. No. 3842	30 December 1929
An Act to declare the Rate of Land Tax for the year ending the thirty-first day of December One thousand nine hundred and thirty.
Closer Settlement (Financial) Act 1929	20 Geo. V. No. 3843	30 December 1929
An Act to amend Sections Nineteen and One hundred and ninety-seven of the Closer Settlement Act 1928. (Note: Closer Settlement Act 1928 (19 Geo. V. No. 3656))
Country Roads Act 1929	20 Geo. V. No. 3844	30 December 1929
An Act relating to Payment of an amount out of The Country Roads Board Fund in the Financial Year beginning on the first day of July One thousand nine hundred and twenty-nine in respect of certain Loans.
State Electricity Commission Act 1929	20 Geo. V. No. 3845	30 December 1929
An Act to provide for the Construction of Tramways and the Management and Operation of Tramway Undertakings by the State Electricity Commission of Victoria in certain Areas and to authorize the Commission to borrow Moneys on Overdraft for a certain purpose and to amend the State Electricity Commission Act 1928. (Note: State Electricity Commission Act 1928 (19 Geo. V. No. 3776))
Entertainments Tax Act 1929	20 Geo. V. No. 3846	30 December 1929
An Act to provide for the Imposition of a Tax upon Payments for Admission to Entertainments.
Melbourne Harbor Trust Act 1929	20 Geo. V. No. 3847	30 December 1929
An Act relating to the Borrowing Powers of the Melbourne Harbor Trust Commissioners.
Stamps (Betting Tax) Act 1929	20 Geo. V. No. 3848	30 December 1929
An Act for imposing certain Stamp Duties on Bookmakers' Licences or Permits and on Betting-Tickets and for other purposes.
Administration and Probate Duties Act 1929	20 Geo. V. No. 3849	30 December 1929
An Act to increase the Duties payable under Part VI. of the Administration and Probate Act 1928. (Note: Administration and Probate Act 1928 (19 Geo. V. No. 3632))
Income Tax Act 1929	20 Geo. V. No. 3850	30 December 1929
An Act to declare the Rates of Income Tax for the year ending on the thirtieth day of June One thousand nine hundred and thirty and to continue the Income Tax Acts.
Motor Omnibus Act 1929	20 Geo. V. No. 3851	30 December 1929
An Act relating to Motor Omnibuses.
Stamps Act 1929	20 Geo. V. No. 3852	30 December 1929
An Act to amend the Law relating to Stamps and Stamp Duties.

== Sources ==
- "1929 Victorian Historical Acts". AustLII.
