= 140 William Street, Perth =

Building in Perth, Western Australia

140 William Street
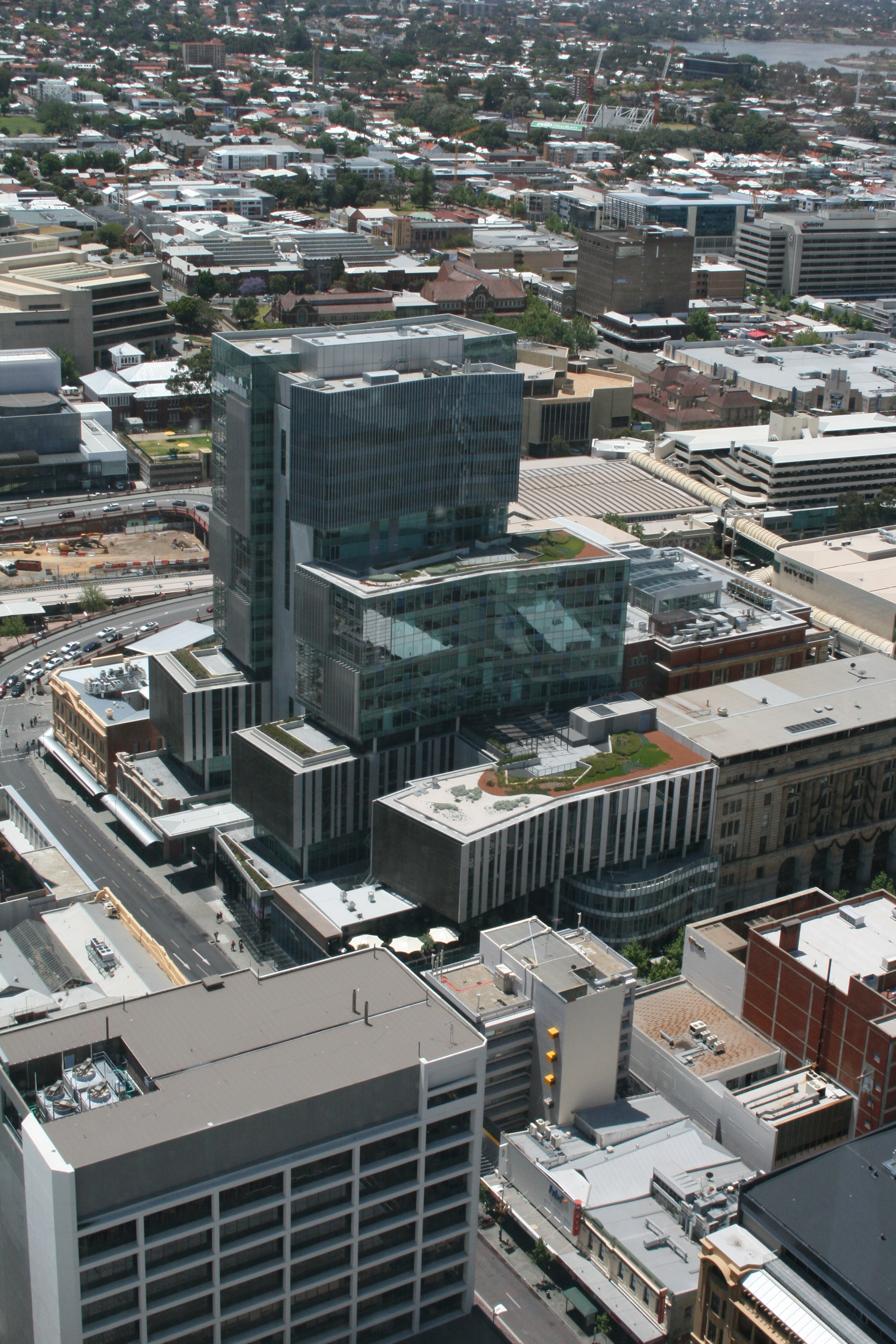
- 140 William Street as seen from Central Park
- Interactive map of the 140 William Street area
- Alternative names: One40william Commercial Tower

General information
- Status: Completed
- Type: Office/retail
- Location: 140 William Street, Perth, Australia
- Coordinates: 31°57′7″S 115°51′29″E
- Current tenants: Government of Western Australia
- Construction started: 2007
- Completed: 2010
- Cost: $200 million

Height
- Height: 92 metres (302 ft)

Technical details
- Floor count: 20

Design and construction
- Architecture firm: Hassell

Website
- www.one40william.com.au

140 William Street (styled as one40william) is a commercial development in Perth, Western Australia.

It includes Gordon Stephenson House, named in honour of Gordon Stephenson, an architect responsible for planning much of modern Perth's urban form through the 1955 Plan for the Metropolitan Region, Perth and Fremantle. It currently houses the government departments of Planning, Lands & Heritage, Transport & Infrastructure and Mines, Industry Regulation & Safety, and various other offices.

== Architecture ==
The site is located over the underground platforms of the Perth railway station. The building includes an entrance to the railway station.

The building has won a number of Western Australian design awards and a 2012 International Architecture Award of the Chicago Athenaeum.

The main building, which is structurally made of concrete, measures 92 metres (302 ft) in height and comprises 20 floors.

== History ==
The land for 140 William Street had been acquired by LandCorp in 2003 and 2004 for the construction of Perth Underground station. The land was developed following the completion of the station. The tender process for the sale and redevelopment of the land began in September 2005. The process was managed by LandCorp in conjunction with the Western Australian Planning Commission. As an incentive, the state government committed to a 15-year lease of 22,000 square metres (240,000 sq ft) of office space within the future development. The developer chosen would have to come to a heritage agreement allowing for the retainment and integration of the Wellington Building, Globe Hotel, Baird's Building, and the Mitchell's Building façade within the development. Four developers were shortlisted in December 2005: Evolution Consortium (Cbus Property and Leighton Contractors), Grocon, Lendlease/Australian Prime Property Fund and Multiplex. Each developer was issued with a request for proposal in March 2006, requiring them to submit their proposals by 28 June. The Evolution Consortium was chosen as the preferred proponent in September 2006, and by December 2006, the contract had been signed and the design revealed. The development was in total worth $200 million. By August 2007, construction had commenced, and in 2010, construction was completed.
