= Gordon Stephenson =

British-born town planner and architect

- Born: 6 June 1908; England
- Died: 29 March 1997 (aged 88); Claremont, Western Australia
- Occupations: Town planner Architect
- Spouse: Flora Bartlett Crockett

Gordon Stephenson (6 June 1908 – 30 March 1997) was a British-born town planner and architect. He had an international career working in the United Kingdom, New Zealand and Canada, but is best known for his role in shaping the modern growth and development of Perth, Western Australia, where he spent the majority of his working life.

== Biography ==
Stephenson was born in 1908. He studied architecture at the University of Liverpool, graduating in 1930. Following this, he studied at the University of Paris, and during this time worked in the atelier of Le Corbusier.

=== Early career ===
Stephenson's early career included working with Patrick Abercrombie on the Greater London Plan. Along with Peter Shepheard, he created an influential design for Stevenage, the first post-war British new town, which incorporated a pedestrianised town centre.

In 1953, Stephenson was commissioned by the state government of Western Australia to produce a plan for the metropolitan area of Perth and Fremantle. The resulting 1955 Plan for the Metropolitan Region, Perth and Fremantle was co-authored with Alistair Hepburn, and is commonly known as the "Stephenson–Hepburn Report". It included an atlas of maps which laid down a broad pattern of future land uses including highways and open space, and catered for significant additional population growth. The report formed the basis for the 1963 Metropolitan Region Scheme for Perth and Fremantle, a legal instrument for regulating land-use and development in the urban area. It remained the overarching strategic plan for the development of Perth until it was succeeded by the Corridor Plan for Perth in 1970.

=== Later career ===
In 1953, Stephenson returned to the UK to take up the Chair of Civic Design at the University of Liverpool and, following his work in Perth, he was employed variously as a consultant planner and academic in New Zealand, Canada, and America. In Halifax, Canada, he is known for his 1957 plan to redevelop the entire downtown core as well as the forceful eviction of Africville, a historically black neighborhood.

He subsequently returned to Perth with his family in 1960 to take up a position as consultant architect for the University of Western Australia (UWA). He played an important role in the development of UWA, Murdoch University and other Australian university campuses.

In 1967 he was appointed to Canberra’s National Capital Development Commission, a position he held until 1973.

He was also responsible for study of central Perthand preparing spatial plans for Joondalup and Midland regional centres.

In retirement, Stephenson authored several books. He died on 30 March 1997.

=== Personal life and collaboration with Flora Crockett ===
In 1938, Stephenson married New Jersey-born Flora Bartlett Crockett (1914–1979). She had been one of the first two women to graduate in City Planning from MIT, in 1937. The two collaborated on published work and research thereafter. Gerald Dix writes of Crockett: "She was an immense support and a sound professional collaborator upon whose judgement her relied in much of his work for 40 years. It was a great blow to him when she died in 1979." The Stephensons had three daughters: Gail, Sarah and Ann.

== Legacy ==
Following his death in 1997, the Western Australian Minister for Planning acknowledged Stephenson's contributions to the development of the state, and his vision as providing the blueprint for the growth of the metropolitan region since 1963. Stephenson Avenue in Perth's western suburbs is named in his honour.

In 2005, RAC included Gordon Stephenson in the Walk of Fame in their West Perth headquarters as one of 16 people who made Western Australian motoring what it is.

On 28 August 2011, the WA State Government announced that the recently completed 140 William Street would be named Gordon Stephenson House.

The Planning Department (Civic Design) at the University of Liverpool was formerly located in the Gordon Stephenson Building.
