= Colonial Town Plans of Perth =

Historical plans of Perth, Western Australia

This article details the colonial town plans that guided the development of the initial Perth town site in the Swan River Colony. This is now the central city area of the Perth metropolitan region.

The 1829 town plan of Perth, Western Australia was an elongated grid pattern that reflected the city planning principles of the day, and likely drew inspiration from colonial Williamsburg (1699) and the Edinburgh "new town" (1768). The plan expressed an enlightenment conception of the town as the seat of civic power within a large and productive agricultural hinterland. Contrary to these ideals, Perth would become the commercial center of the colony, and later, metropolitan region with a layout that has remained relatively unchanged to the present day. However, the construction of the Kwinana Freeway between Parliament House and St Georges Terrace in the 1960s can be seen as a final attempt to deliver on the original objective of separating civil and commercial centres of power.

== Instructions for the planning of Perth ==
Land settlement in Australia generally followed the following process: Land was claimed by the crown, then surveyed by the colonial authorities, and either granted, sold or leased to settlers. During the initial stages of settlement and consequent planning, there was no common set of regulations. However, in 1829, as the number of towns began expanding in New South Wales, Governor Darling issued regulations for the dimensions of streets and allotments. These regulations were not in force in Western Australia, but a copy of them was included in George Murray's instructions to Governor Stirling with a comment that they should be adhered to as closely as circumstances would permit.

Murray's directives for Perth's town plan were quite general: The chosen site was to be suitable as the seat of government in Western Australia. It was to be surrounded by an area of three square miles as a reserve for future expansion, and allotments within the town were to be granted on only twenty year leases, leaving scope for future developments should they be necessary. Land was to be marked out and reserved for public purposes and all the other requirements essential for the future welfare of the settlement:

In laying the foundations of any such Town, care must be taken to proceed upon a regular plan, leaving all vacant spaces which will in future times be required for thoroughfares, and as the sites of Churches, Cemeteries, and other Public Works of utility and general convenience.

Governor Stirling in turn gave instructions to the Surveyor-General, John Septimus Roe, who was responsible for surveying and laying out of the town site. This work was conducted from a tent camp in the vicinity of the modern Supreme Court gardens in August 1829. Events rapidly overtook Stirling's original instructions. From 1831, land allocation policy was changed to allow for the sale of town allottments as conditional freehold, and the conversion of existing leases to freehold over the next decade.

== The first town plan (1829–1833) ==
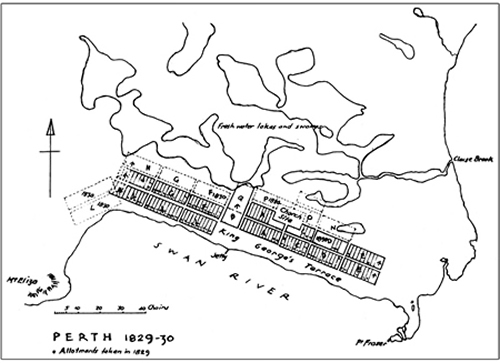
First town plan for Perth, surveyed by John Septimus Roe in August, 1829

The first survey was completed in 1829, but was not published in its entirety until 1833. The plan was a semi-regular grid pattern bounded by Mount Eliza to the west, wetlands to the north, and tilted on an angle so that the principal streets ran parallel to the river, which formed the boundary to the south and the east. Stirling's instructions had been to orientate the streets towards the cardinal points of the compass, probably to take advantage of the western sea breeze. Roe, however, chose to run them parallel to the river, a decision some regard as a mistake. To this day the presence of windy conditions in the central city continues to be a problem.

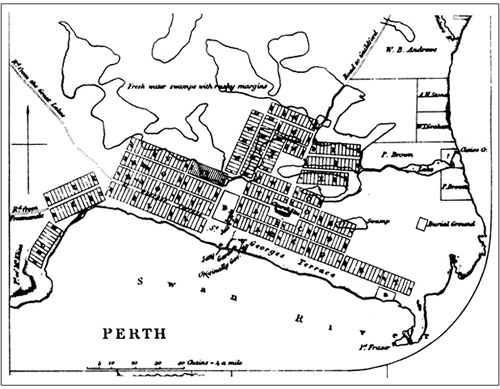
The 1833 'Arrowsmith' town plan of Perth, showing the orientation of the town lots north of the square

The basis of the 1829 plan was to have three principal streets parallel to the river, and three running north–south through the existing swamps. Along the length of the river bank ran a long, broad street that was to become the main thoroughfare - St Georges Terrace. It was 99 feet wide, the standard width for a main street in colonial planning. Stretching northwards from the center was another wide street - Stirling Street - that was to be the principal axis for northern expansion of the city. A large open space between St Georges Terrace and the river allowed for recreational pursuits and reflected Stirling's intention that Perth was to be the administrative centre of the colony. However, demand from speculators would lead to the subdivision and sale of land to the south of the Terrace.

The plan centered on a large open space between Barrack and Pier Streets that was to contain a barracks and parade ground. The land to the west of the barracks was intended for trade and commerce, and in fact remains today as the commercial and financial center of the state economy. To the east of the barracks was the Government domain.

Stirling Square was marked out and set aside for a botanic garden. It became a small park, however and King's Park was retained for the display of native flora.

=== Land use regulations ===
Building regulations were published with the goal of creating an environment where the buildings had an air of gentility and respectability. Allotments along the most prestigious streets were granted strictly on the basis of social standing. This was done before general applications from settlers could be made. The Town Plan also employed a style of zoning and regulation that marked different blocks for different classes of occupants:

Section A was designated for government offices.
Section B for official persons.
Section C for government employees and Tradesmen.
Section D for doctors and others connected to the establishment and so on.

For example, to be granted land along King George's Terrace required one to construct a house at a minimum cost of 200 pounds, while houses on the secondary streets were to cost at least 100 pounds. In both areas houses were required to be built within two years. By requiring such high building values, and prompt development time, the regulations deliberately excluded those who lacked wealth and social status.

An 1833 building code also required houses to be situated: "on the middle line of each lot and the front of the building to be 30 feet from the boundary of lot on the street". This was intended to create a more open, spacious environment of detached houses surrounded by trees, orchards and gardens, a contrast to the busy streets, and tightly packed housing, of the urban landscape in the working class city of Fremantle. It was also intended to avoid encroachments over property boundaries before the completion of a more detailed survey.

A visitor to Perth in 1863 noted that in most towns the homes in the best parts of the town stood detached in their own gardens, whereas the appearance of Perth was that: "the whole place is rather that of one of those suburbs ... it makes the place much prettier than it would probably be if a larger trade were carried on there."

=== Influences ===
Comparison of Perth and Edinburgh New Town plans

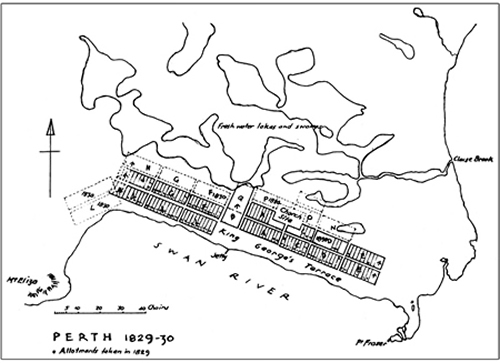
Perth town plan (1829)

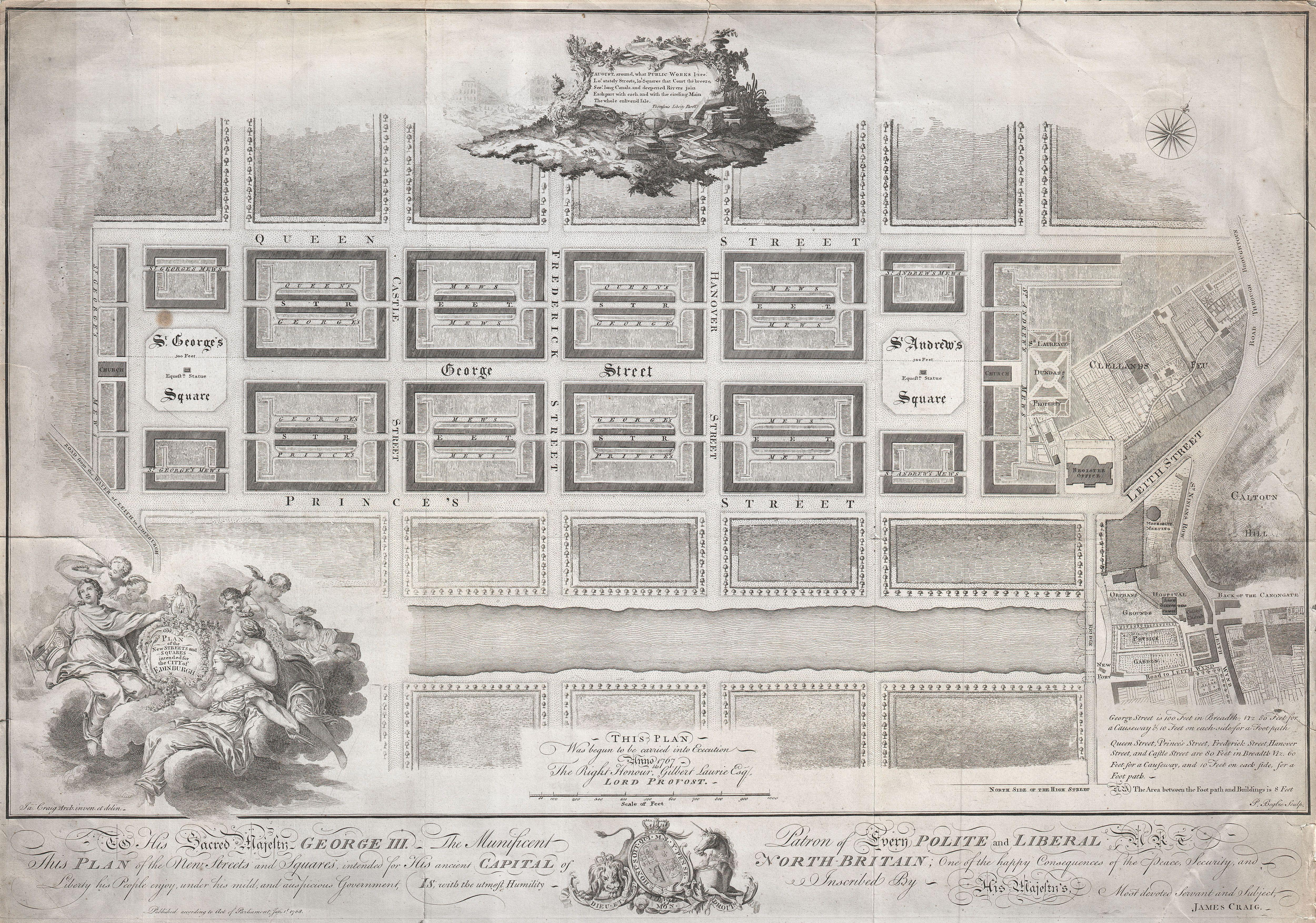
Plan of Edinburgh New Town (1768)

The layout and design of Perth was influenced by the urban planning principles of the time, the colonial experience in Australia and elsewhere, and the practicalities of administrating land grants.

Historian Geoffrey Bolton identifies the New Town, Edinburgh as the model for the Perth layout. It is probable that this was the case because Governor Stirling was a Scot, and a Scottish influence had already been established with the naming of the city after Perth, Scotland. Between 1752 and 1822, Scottish Edinburgh had been extended in regularly surveyed street blocks that became famous for "dignified and orderly planning". Although not explicitly acknowledged by them, the extension would have been well known to Stirling and Roe, and exerted an influence over their city design.

The town plan also shows the influence of Williamsburg, the capital of Virginia. Founded in 1699, this city was a model for many subsequent colonial capitals. Grid patterns had been appearing quite early in the towns of North and South America, but these were based on the Iberian model of a perfect square. Historian Felicity Morel-Edniebrown suggests that Williamsburg introduced the feature of a long, broad street with key buildings terminating its vistas. Like Perth, the centre of the town was also dominated by a large open space known as Market Square. This square separated the town into two large rectangles, east and west, as the B Square on Barracks Street did in Perth. Also, like Williamsburg, Perth was conceived as the capital of a large and productive hinterland, within which the administrative, institutional, and religious powers of the state resided, where a colonial gentry could maintain social and business ties. That this was the intention was well understood, as reflected by the comments of the naval surgeon T.B. Wilson, who visited Perth briefly in October 1829, and described the intended future of the main street:

the intended principal street of which, named St. George’s terrace, – where the future beaux and belles of Western Australia may, in after times, show off their reciprocal attractive charms – was, at present, only adorned with lofty trees, and a variety of lovely flowers.

== Second town plan (1838) ==
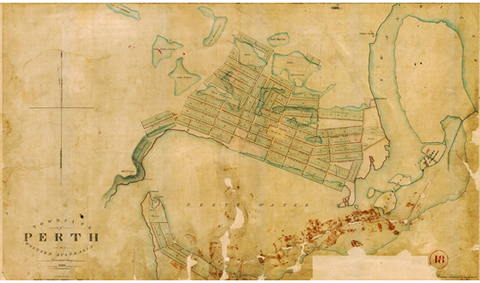
The second town plan of Perth in 1838, showing the extension of lots northwards and eastward from those depicted in 1833.

The second town plan was published nine years later in 1838, and showed the town expanding to the north through the chain of wetlands and swamps. Although the colonists had initially been disparaging of the swampland, and consequently these areas were avoided in the 1829 plan, they quickly realised that in contrast to much of the soil on the Swan coastal plan, the wetlands were reasonably fertile, and thus highly desirable for market gardening and orchards. Drainage of the swamps commenced in 1833, and continued for 25 years with lots being taken up as water receded. Because of this perceived fertility, interest on the part of the settlers in purchasing swamp soils was keen. Unlike the rest of Perth, the layout of the Northern Streets was decided by the nature of the landscape, the presence of the lakes and wetlands, and the drainage plans. A century later, in 1938, when the early impetus for draining the lakes had been forgotten, Town Clerk W.E. Bold described the missed opportunity that had presented itself in the wetlands:

Opportunities which presented themselves at the beginning of the colony of laying out an ideal garden city by taking advantage, for ornamental purposes, of the chain of lakes from the eastern end of the City to Monger’s Lake in the north-west

== See also ==
- Land grants in the Swan River Colony
- 1955 Plan for the Metropolitan Region, Perth and Fremantle
- 1970 Corridor Plan for Perth
