= Alistair Hepburn =

Australian town planner (1915–2004)

- Born: 8 March 1915; London, England
- Died: 7 September 2004 (aged 89); Melbourne, Australia
- Occupation: Town planner

John Alistair Hepburn (8 March 1915 – 7 September 2004) was a town planner, noted for his contributions to the design and development of the urban regions within greater Perth in Western Australia, and Melbourne, Victoria.

== Early life ==
Hepburn was born on 8 March 1915 in London. He studied as a chartered surveyor and valuer at Eastbourne College of Arts and Technology in East Sussex before joining the Royal Artillery during World War II.

== Career ==
After the war, he practised as a town planning consultant in London and Middlesex and emigrated to Australia in 1951, where he joined the Brisbane City Council and later the Cumberland County Council in Sydney.

In 1953, he took a position as the Town Planning Commissioner for Western Australia. At this time, he joined with Professor Gordon Stephenson, who had been commissioned specifically to produce a plan for the metropolitan areas of Perth and Fremantle. The pair co-authored the 1955 Plan for the Metropolitan Region, Perth and Fremantle, which has served as the blueprint for town planning in the region since then.

He moved to Victoria in 1959, where he took a position of Chief Planner for the Melbourne and Metropolitan Board of Works. He held positions there until his retirement in 1978. During his time in Melbourne, he helped guide the expansion of the city and the metropolitan region during the 1960s and 1970s. He also held council positions at La Trobe University both prior to its establishment in 1964, and continuing there until 1970. He was made an Officer (Civil) of the Order of the British Empire and in 2000 received a Centenary Medal.

== Death ==
He died on 7 September 2004.

== Legacy ==
The major arterial road Hepburn Avenue in Perth's northern suburbs is named in his honour.
