= Metropolitan Town Planning Commission =

Town planning advisory body for the city of Melbourne, Australia.

The Metropolitan Town Planning Commission was created in 1922 by the Victorian state government to provide advice for the planning and development of the city of Melbourne, Australia. It produced the first comprehensive urban development strategy for Melbourne in 1929, and influenced future development for many years

== Origin ==
Urban growth in the early 20th century was putting pressure on infrastructure in Melbourne including increased land use conflicts. A town planning conference was convened by the Melbourne City Council on 1 October 1920, recognising the need for the 'regulation of development on modern scientific lines'. The Local Government Act 1921 allowed municipalities to introduce by-laws to define residential areas where new 'trade, industry or commercial issues' could be prohibited – a form of land use zoning. In the following year, as a consequence of 'a consistent agitation' the Metropolitan Town Planning Commission Act 1922 was passed. The Commission was chaired by City of Melbourne councilor and architect Frank Stapley.

The commission was empowered to 'report upon the present conditions and tendencies of urban development' and to 'set out general plans and recommendations with respect to the better guidance and control of such development'.

== Town planning ==
The commission undertook a range of research to identify both the problems in Melbourne's planning, and theory and practice for resolving them. Prominent surveyor and planner Saxil Tuxen worked acted (in voluntary capacity) as a technical expert, travelling to the United States in 1925, to examine their approaches to surveying and planning. His primary authorities were Melbourne's waterways, roadways and public transport, where he tried to ensure that Melbourne's tram networks were preserved and maintained, at a time when other planning experts were calling for them to be removed and to promote development which incorporated Melbourne's waterways, notably, the Yarra River.

== Railways ==
The initial 1929 report recommended an underground railway to bypass the city from Richmond to North Melbourne stations via Exhibition and Victoria streets, to alleviate the congestion at Flinders Street station. This led ultimately to the construction of the Melbourne Underground Rail Loop It also proposed a city square over the railway yard between Flinders Street and Batman Avenue, running east 33 feet (10 m) from Princes Bridge, but was later dropped as unsuitable due to cost and traffic congestion. This was ultimately completed as Federation Square.

The construction of two new suburban railway lines was also suggested: a railway line to Doncaster, (echoing the 1928 Railways Standing Committee of the Victorian Parliament via an extension of the Kew branch lineMap) This was not built, but another recommendation of the MTPC's, for a Glen Waverley line, did see the line extended from Darling railway station.

== Legacy ==
Although the 1929 plan was not formally implemented, many of its ideas were eventually adopted. In the early 1950s the planning system was substantially created as we know it today with the 1954 Melbourne Metropolitan Planning Scheme

== See also ==
- Gordon Stephenson
- List of Victoria Government Infrastructure Plans, Proposals and Studies
