= Perth metropolitan region =

Metropolitan region of Western Australia

Coordinates: 31.95°S 115.86°E

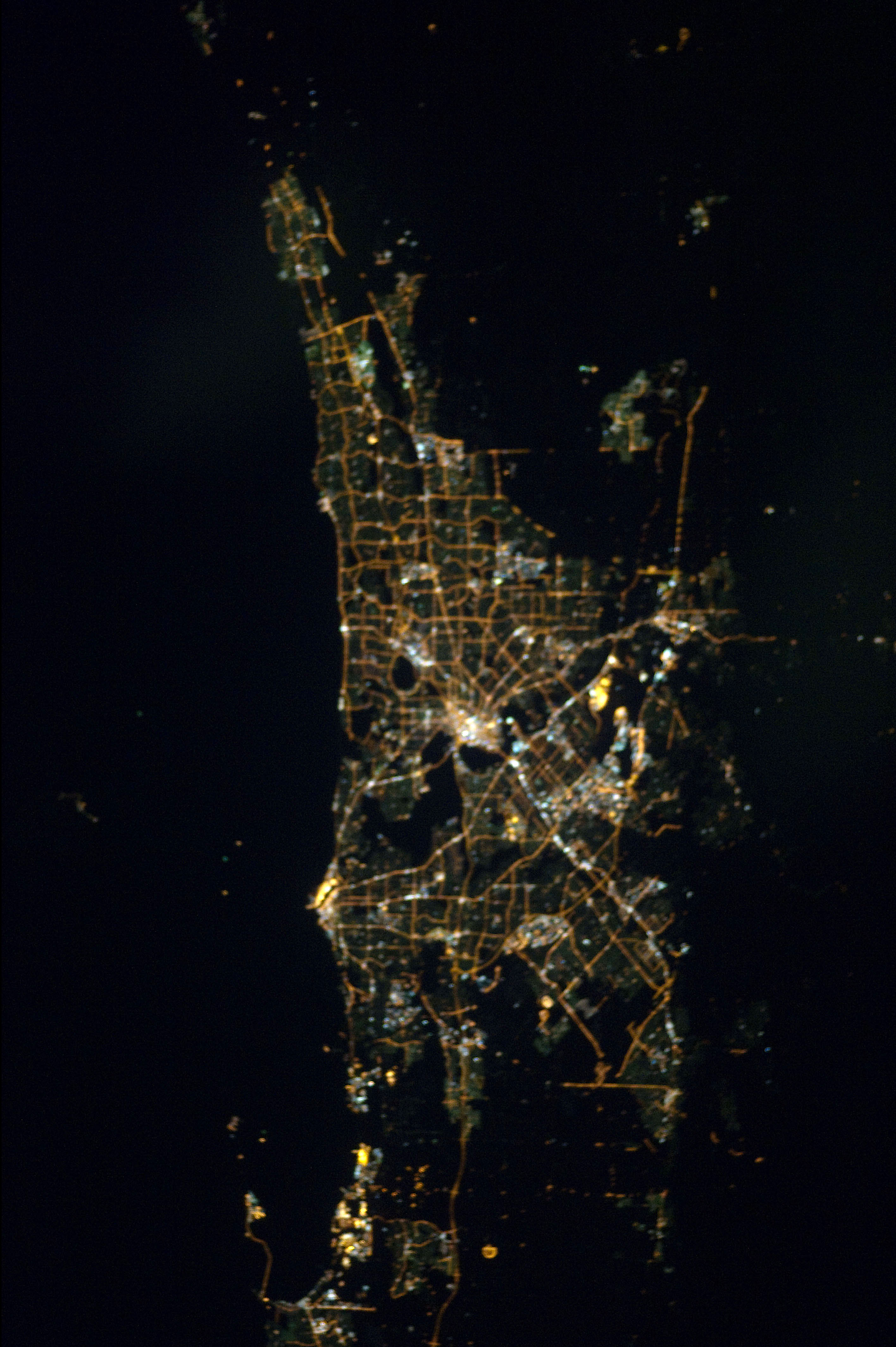
Satellite image of the Perth metropolitan region at night.

The Perth metropolitan region, also called the Perth metropolitan area, is the administrative area and geographical extent of the Western Australian capital city of Perth and its conurbation.

It generally includes the coastal strip from Two Rocks in the north to Singleton in the south, and inland to The Lakes in the east, but its extent can be defined in a number of ways:

- The metropolitan region is defined by the Planning and Development Act 2005 to include 30 local government areas with the outer extent being the City of Wanneroo and the City of Swan to the north, the Shire of Mundaring, City of Kalamunda, and the City of Armadale to the east, the Shire of Serpentine-Jarrahdale to the southeast and the City of Rockingham to the southwest, and including the islands of Rottnest Island and Garden Island off the west coast. This extent correlates with the Metropolitan Region Scheme.
- The Australian Bureau of Statistics' Perth (Major Statistical Division) accords with the Metropolitan Region Scheme area.
- The Regional Development Commissions Act 1993 includes the Shire of Serpentine-Jarrahdale in the Peel region instead.
- The Australian Bureau of Statistics Greater Capital City Statistical Area, or Greater Perth in short, consists of the area defined by the Metropolitan Region Scheme, plus the City of Mandurah and the Pinjarra Level 2 Statistical Area of the Shire of Murray.

The Perth metropolitan region is grouped with the Peel region in some urban planning documents including the Western Australian Planning Commission's Directions 2031 and Beyond and the Perth and Peel@3.5 million suite of documents. Together, the Perth and Peel regions stretch 158 kilometres (98 mi) from Two Rocks in the north to Herron in the south and are currently home to more than two million people.

== Subregions and local government areas ==
Local government areas of the Perth metropolitan region (Metropolitan Region Scheme)

According to the Metropolitan Region Scheme, the Perth metropolitan region comprises the following 5 subregions and 30 local government areas (20 cities, 3 shires, and 7 towns):

- Inner Metro Area – 19 LGAs (11 cities, 1 shire, and 7 towns)
  - City of Bayswater
  - City of Belmont
  - City of Canning
  - City of Fremantle
  - City of Melville
  - City of Nedlands
  - City of Perth – seat of the Government of Western Australia
  - City of South Perth
  - City of Stirling
  - City of Subiaco
  - City of Vincent
  - Shire of Peppermint Grove
  - Town of Bassendean
  - Town of Cambridge
  - Town of Claremont
  - Town of Cottesloe
  - Town of East Fremantle
  - Town of Mosman Park
  - Town of Victoria Park
- North-eastern Outer Metro Area – 3 LGAs (2 cities and 1 shire)
  - City of Kalamunda
  - City of Swan
  - Shire of Mundaring
- North-western Outer Metro Area – 2 LGAs (2 cities)
  - City of Joondalup
  - City of Wanneroo
- South-eastern Outer Metro Area – 3 LGAs (2 cities and 1 shire)
  - City of Armadale
  - City of Gosnells
  - Shire of Serpentine-Jarrahdale (Note: The Department of Primary Industries and Regional Development includes the Shire of Serpentine-Jarrahdale in the Peel region instead.)
- South-western Outer Metro Area – 3 LGAs (3 cities)
  - City of Cockburn
  - City of Kwinana
  - City of Rockingham

== Liveability ==
According to a 2019 report from the Ipsos Life in Australia project, Perth's Inner Metro Area was rated the most liveable metropolitan area in Australia.

In 2023, the City of Subiaco was ranked the most liveable local government area in Australia in the 2023 Australian Liveability Census.

== See also ==
- 1955 Plan for the Metropolitan Region, Perth and Fremantle
- List of islands of Perth, Western Australia
- List of Perth suburbs
- Western Australian Planning Commission
