= Norweto =

Norweto (a contraction of "North West Township") was a low-cost suburban development proposed in 1986 for black South Africans during the Apartheid era in South Africa. It was closer to northern suburbs, which consisted of both affluent white areas and very rural multi-racial area than Soweto (upon which it was based), and the development was canceled after complaints from the "Greenbelt Action Group", among others.

The Green Belt Action Group was founded in 1986 by a group of smallholders situate North of Johannesburg (in a declared Green Belt) to oppose the "Draft Guide Plan for the Pretoria. Witwatersrand, Vereeniging (PWV)". The group consisted of an eclectic group of people of a variety of original Nationalities and professions. Their political views ranged from far right to far left.

The primary opposition from the Greenbelt Action Group was because the proposed township development was to be on protected greenbelt land. In addition, the area had a reputation for being a safe haven for all races, including multi-racial couples.

It was closer to northern suburbs, which consisted of both affluent white areas and very rural multi-racial area than Soweto (upon which it was based), and the development was canceled after complaints from the "Greenbelt Action Group", among others

The Draft Guide plan was an ill-conceived and essentially ill researched plan for the development of the huge PWV area it embraced proposed highways, townships, water reticulation and agriculture to name a few. In essence the whole plan was a product of the Apartheid era, Norweto for example was supported by the Town of Randburg, a town that practiced a "White by Night Policy and was some 20 km from the town with the only access via a single lane road. The name Norweto was a small part of it and was not a Government name but one "invented' by the Environmental Editor of a Johannesburg Daily News paper. GAG raised over 250,000 written objections to the Guide plan by means of public meetings, media articles and interviews. Their efforts all being during a declared State of Emergency. Eventually they were invited (at their own expense) to sit on a Government Planning Committee.
