= Metropolitan Region Scheme =

Planning scheme for the metropolitan area of Perth, Western Australia

Coordinates: 31°57′S 115°51′E

Local government areas of the Perth metropolitan region

The Metropolitan Region Scheme (MRS) provides the legal basis for land use planning within the Perth metropolitan region. It defines the future use of land by applying broad zones and reservations. The scheme is administered by the Western Australian Planning Commission (WAPC). It is one of three regional schemes in Western Australia. The MRS is updated via an ongoing process of amendments. Amendments to the MRS are typically informed by a series of strategic plans prepared by the Department of Planning, Lands & Heritage. Detailed land use planning within the area of the MRS is undertaken by local governments and other statutory authorities which prepare one or more local planning schemes within their administrative boundaries. Local planning schemes must be consistent with the MRS and require the approval of the Minister for Planning. The acquisition of land reserved under the MRS is funded by a hypothecated land tax called the Metropolitan Region Improvement Tax.

== Background ==
The Metropolitan Region Scheme was prepared on the basis of the 1955 Plan for the Metropolitan Region, Perth and Fremantle and has been in operation since 1963. Hepburn and Stephenson were commissioned by the Government of Western Australia to develop the plan in 1953. The completed report recommended that a regional planning authority be established for the purpose of implementing a regional planning scheme – a recommendation that was passed into law with the Metropolitan Region Town Planning Scheme Act 1959 (MRTPS Act 1959). The act centralised regional planning and subdivision control, keeping it in the hands of the state government, but delegated many local planning responsibilities to local governments.

Since 1963 the zoning map of the MRS has been continuously updated via a series of amendments which change the zoning or reservation of land. These amendments are typically informed by a range of strategic planning documents. These include the overarching regional strategies that began with the 1955 Plan, followed by the Corridor Plan of 1970, the Metroplan of 1990, and Directions 2031 and Beyond in 2010, followed by Perth and Peel @ 3.5 Million in 2018.

In 2006 the Planning and Development Act 2005 superseded the MRTPS Act 1959 and allowed for the creation of new region schemes outside the Perth metropolitan area.

In 2024 the text of the Metropolitan Region Scheme received the first significant update in 60 years to align the scheme provisions with the contemporary planning framework and other Western Australian region schemes.

== Metropolitan Region Improvement Tax ==
The Metropolitan Region Scheme reserves land for public purposes. This include land required for regional transport corridors, public open space, infrastructure and environmental conservation.

The acquisition of reserved land is funded by the Metropolitan Region Improvement Tax (MRIT), a special purpose tax. The MRIT is levied on taxable land value above $300,000 (excluding primary residences). This tax is collected by the Department of Finance but control over expenditures falls wholly under the control of the WAPC.

A 2013 report calculated that MRTS has funded more than $1 billion of land acquisitions since 1963.

The MRIT applies only to the MRS area and has not been extended to the Peel Region Scheme or Greater Bunbury Scheme areas. Land acquisition under these schemes is funded by annual grants from the state budget.

== See also ==
- Sydney Region Outline Plan
