= Corridor Plan for Perth =

1970 plan for Perth, Western Australia

The Corridor Plan for Perth
- Created: 1970
- Commissioned by: Metropolitan Region Planning Authority
- Purpose: Regional planning strategy

The 1970 Corridor Plan for Perth provided a strategic framework for planning the growth of the Perth metropolitan area, in Western Australia. The plan superseded the 1955 Plan for the Metropolitan Region and established the principles on which the Metropolitan Regional Planning Authority would consider amendments to the Metropolitan Region Scheme. In contrast to the earlier plan, the Corridor Plan was not a detailed spatial plan of the entire metropolitan area. Instead it was intended to provide a policy framework for the detailed structure planning of each of the four proposed corridors. Initially it was controversial; the government of the day instigated both an independent review and an Honorary Royal Commission into the plan before adopting a modified version. A second review of the plan was completed in 1987, followed by the preparation and adoption of the 1990 Metroplan.

== Background ==
In 1966 the MRPA commenced a review of the Region Scheme with the intent of determining whether the future expansion of Perth should occur via "clusters" or "corridors". Theoretical debate over the merits of these two theories occurred throughout the late 1960s, and similar plans had been prepared for Sydney and Copenhagen.

The MRPA eventually settled on the application of corridor planning principles as the right approach for Perth in February 1969, and commenced detailed planning of the Armadale corridor before moving on to complete a plan for the whole of the metropolitan area by November 1970.

The intent of the Corridor Plan was to accommodate future development of the metropolitan region whilst maximising economic efficiency. In this, it complemented the Perth Regional Transportation Study published in January 1970, which concluded that "corridor planning provides the most economic transport system for the Region".

== Recommendations ==
The Corridor Plan included a number of key predictions and recommendations as follows:

- Employment in the central business district to be limited to 120,000 jobs
- Large areas of open space to be located between the corridors
- The development of the sub-regional centres of Armadale, Joondalup, Whitfords, Rockingham and Midland
- A comprehensive, high-speed bus service to provide public transport to the region, including bus lanes in existing railway reserves converging on the CBD
- Suburban train facilities to be progressively suspended between Perth and Midland, Armadale and Fremantle
- That water resources and their management be recognised as major determinant in the sustainable development of the metropolitan region

== Reception and criticism ==
Academic Dave Hedgecock describes the 1960s as a time when academic and professional consensus around metropolitan planning began to collapse. The Corridor Plan represented a paradigm shift away from “planning by design” to “planning by science” and never achieved the level of support and political consensus enjoyed by the earlier Stephenson-Hepburn plan. It remained controversial through its preparation and period of operation.

Inherited by the incoming Labor government, the plan was not initially supported by the Minister for Development and Decentralisation Herb Graham who sought an additional corridor in the north-east.

The state government appointed Paul Ritter to provide comment on the plan. The opposition challenged this appointment on the grounds that Ritter‘s views were already known and that he could not undertake an independent review. Ultimately, Ritter’s report was critical, and proposed an alternative urban form that focussed growth around the existing city centre, facilitated private vehicle access (a “drive-up-to city”) and rejected the development of sub-regional centres. Ritter’s proposals were not taken seriously by the media or the state government.

Simultaneously, an Honorary Royal Commission into the plan was initiated by the Legislative Council in 1971. The purpose of the commission was to enquire into and report on the preparation of the Corridor Plan. The Commission completed its investigation in 1972. The commission concluded that the corridor planning concept was sound in principle, but identified a number of deficiencies in the report presentation and proposed implementation. The findings of the commission did not lead to a formal review of the plan, and the MRPA published its own report defending the Corridor Plan against criticism.

Passenger services on the Fremantle line were suspended on 1 September 1979, in line with the recommendations of the Corridor Plan. The closure led to a public backlash and the service was reinstated on 29 July 1983 following a change of government.

A review of the Corridor Plan commenced in 1985 due to deficiencies in the population projections which had anticipated a metropolitan population of 1.4 million by 1989--approximately 250,000 short of the actual numbers. The Corridor Plan also incorrectly identified sub-regional centres as the primary source of non-CBD based employment growth, when in reality most employment growth occurred in the inner City suburbs around the central area.
