= William Allan McInnes Green =

William Allan McInnes Green or W. A. McI. Green (24 January 1896 – 5 September 1972) was a civil engineer and town clerk at Perth, Western Australia from 1937 to 1966. He was credited by Professor Martyn Webb with being "Western Australia's most experienced, qualified and versatile local government officer".

As an engineer he was quick to grasp essentials, as an architect he had a flair for seeing things as a whole, and as an administrator he believed in thorough preparation and research. He was either the designer or the adviser for practically every building constructed by the city council between 1944 and 1966. In 1963 he was appointed C.M.G. His appointment was extended to 1966, by when he was three years beyond the stipulated age for retirement.

== Early life and education ==
Green was born in Adelaide, South Australia where his father, Thompson Green, a riveter, was a sometime state parliamentarian and local-government representative. His mother's maiden name was Margaret Kelly. The boy was educated at Adelaide High School and first employed as a railway draughtsman. During World War II, he served with the First Australian Imperial Force on the Western Front (1917–18). At age 24, he enrolled at the South Australian School of Mines and Industries before graduating at the University of Adelaide as a civil engineer (B.Eng. 1928).

== Career ==
In 1932 he married Edyth Thomas in Adelaide, and was working under the chief engineer of South Australian Railways. He later became design engineer to the Adelaide City Council, and had a term in Tasmania, as assistant city engineer to the Launceston City Council. Green was appointed in 1937 to the post of City Architect in Perth, where he remained for the rest of his life. His appointment as Town Clerk was made in August 1944.
