= Plan for the Metropolitan Region, Perth and Fremantle =

1955 plan for Perth, Western Australia

- Created: 1955
- Commissioned by: Honorary Royal Commission of the Legislative Council
- Author(s): Gordon Stephenson, Alistair Hepburn
- Purpose: Regional planning strategy

The 1955 Plan for the Metropolitan Region, Perth and Fremantle (also known as the Stephenson–Hepburn Report) was prepared for the Government of Western Australia by Gordon Stephenson and Alistair Hepburn. The plan was the first regional plan for Perth, and provided the basis for land use zoning under the Metropolitan Region Scheme. Even though not every recommendation of the report was adopted it is considered to have provided the underlying template for the modern development of Perth. The plan was superseded by the Corridor Plan for Perth in 1970.

== Background ==
The Town Planning and Development Act 1928 provided for local authorities to prepare a town planning scheme, but did not include provisions for the creation of any overarching regional scheme. In 1952, the report of an Honorary Royal Commission of the Legislative Council recommended metropolitan planning for the centres of Perth and Fremantle.

In 1952, minister for works David Brand and director of works Russell Dumas received cabinet approval to develop a comprehensive regional plan, anticipating a significant change in population from the recently approved industrialisation of Kwinana. Stephenson was recruited to Australia in early 1953 by Dumas, joining newly appointed town planning commissioner Alistair Hepburn in Perth.

== Implementation and legacy ==
The recommendations of the 1955 Plan foreshadowed, anticipated or directly contributed to the following outcomes:

- The creation of a Metropolitan Region Planning Authority in 1960 to implement the recommendations of the report.
- The creation of the Metropolitan Region Scheme in 1963, which amongst other things, reserved land for a regional highway network and made provision for regional and district open space.
- The creation of a single, statutory authority responsible for the planning and administration of Western Australia's regional road network.
- The creation of eight new freeways and highways through the metropolitan area.
- The partial demolition of the Pensioner's Barracks on St Georges Terrace in 1966.
- Community opposition to the construction of an aquatic centre in Kings Park, leading to the defeat of two bills in parliament in 1957/58, and the eventual construction of the Beatty Park aquatic centre in North Perth.
- The construction of a new Council House on St Georges Terrace in 1963, consolidating the City of Perth's various offices around the central business district.
- The adoption of building by-laws throughout local government areas regulating housing density through plot ratio controls.
- The preparation of a comprehensive plan for the Kwinana industrial and port hinterland.
- The preparation of coordinated plans for coastal spaces.
- Sinking of the railway line through the Perth CBD, initially investigated in the 1960s, but only completed by the Perth City Link project several decades later.

== Analysis ==
A 2012 academic review of the Plan stated that Stephenson's ideas were those of a modernist town planner, influenced by Le Corbusier and the modernism movement. Stephenson's plan was identified by George Seddon as giving primacy to the automobile, and responsible for making Perth the worst adapted capital city for public transport. Other academics note that whilst Stephenson did allow for extensive public transport systems, the implementation was left to state government agencies working within a political culture that favoured the private automobile.

Chief Justice Wayne Martin described the plan as creating "a region which is essentially a network of dormitory suburbs linked by freeways in search of a soul".

== See also ==
- Greater London Plan (1944)
- Melbourne Metropolitan Planning Scheme (1954)
- County of Cumberland planning scheme, Sydney (1948)
- Colonial Town Plans of Perth
