= List of major roads in Perth, Western Australia =

Freeways, highways, and arterial roads in Perth, Western Australia form the basis of the road network inside the Perth Metropolitan Region. Main Roads Western Australia controls and maintains all freeways and highways, as well as some arterial roads, collectively known as state roads. The remaining roads are the responsibility of local governments; major roads provide links to various destinations within the Perth Metropolitan Region.

Some of these roads, or portions of them, are designated and signposted as part of a road route. National Highways and National Routes are road routes of national significance, whilst State Routes in Perth are allocated to the main routes connecting its urban centres. Additionally, roads through areas of scenic or historic significance are designated as part of a Tourist Drive. Each route has a unique marker: National Highways have gold numbers on a green shield, National Routes have black numbers on a white shield, State Routes have white numbers on a blue shield, Tourist Drives have white numbers on a brown shield.

Road	From	Via	To	Notes
Abernethy Road	Belmont	Kewdale	Hazelmere	State Route 55
Albany Highway	Victoria Park	Cannington	Armadale	State Route 30 / Tourist Drive 205. Continues south-east to Albany.
Alexander Drive	Menora	Dianella	Landsdale	State Route 56
Armadale Road	Jandakot	Forrestdale	Armadale	State Route 14
Bannister Road	Canning Vale		Thornlie	
Beach Road	Marmion	Warwick	Malaga	
Beaufort Street	Northbridge	Mount Lawley	Bedford	State Route 53
Beeliar Drive	Lake Coogee	Beeliar	Jandakot	State Route 14
Benara Road	Noranda		Caversham	State Route 76
Berrigan Drive	Jandakot		South Lake	
The Boulevard	City Beach		Wembley	State Route 72
Brookton Highway	Kelmscott	Roleystone	Ashendon	State Route 40 / Tourist Drive 205. Continues east to Brookton.
Broun Avenue	Bedford		Bayswater	State Route 53
Burns Beach Road	Iluka	Currambine	Neerabup	State Route 87
Canning Highway	Fremantle	Applecross	Victoria Park	National Route 1 / State Route 6
Canning Road	Kalamunda	Carmel	Karragullen	State Route 41
Charles Street	Northbridge	North Perth	Joondanna	State Route 60
Cockburn Road	Hamilton Hill	Coogee	Naval Base	State Route 12
Collier Road	Morley		Bassendean	
Connolly Drive	Currambine	Clarkson	Butler	
Corfield Street	Huntingdale	Gosnells	Champion Lakes	State Route 36
Crimea Street	Noranda		Morley	
Curtin Avenue	Cottesloe		North Fremantle	State Route 71 / Tourist Drive 204
Drumpellier Drive	Bennett Springs	Whiteman	Ellenbrook	
Ennis Avenue	Rockingham	Warnbro	Baldivis	National Route 1
Farrington Road	North Lake		Leeming	
Fitzgerald Street	Northbridge	North Perth	Menora	State Route 56
Garratt Road	Bayswater		Ascot	State Route 55
Gnangara Road	Madeley	Cullacabardee	Henley Brook	State Route 83
Graham Farmer Freeway	West Perth	East Perth	Rivervale	State Route 8
Grand Boulevard	Joondalup			
Grand Promenade	Dianella	Bedford	Bayswater	State Route 55
Great Eastern Highway	Burswood	Ascot	South Guildford	National Highway 94 / National Route 1 / State Route 51 / Tourist Drive 203. Continues east to Kalgoorlie
Great Eastern Highway	Guildford	Mundaring	The Lakes	National Highway 94 / National Route 1 / State Route 51 / Tourist Drive 203. Continues east to Kalgoorlie
Great Eastern Highway Bypass	South Guildford		Hazelmere	National Highway 94
Great Northern Highway	Midland	Upper Swan	Bullsbrook	National Highway 95 / National Route 1 / Tourist Drive 203 / Tourist Drive 359
Guildford Road	Mount Lawley	Bayswater	Bassendean	State Route 51
Hampton Road	Fremantle		Hamilton Hill	State Route 12
Hepburn Avenue	Hillarys	Alexander Heights	Ballajura	State Route 82
High Road	Riverton		Lynwood	State Route 27
High Street	Fremantle		Palmyra	State Route 7
Hodges Drive	Ocean Reef	Heathridge	Joondalup	
Joondalup Drive	Edgewater	Joondalup	Banksia Grove	State Route 85 / Tourist Drive 359
Kalamunda Road	South Guildford	Maida Vale	Kalamunda	State Route 41
Karel Avenue	Rossmoyne	Leeming	Jandakot	
Karrinyup Road	Trigg	Karrinyup	Balcatta	State Route 76 / Tourist Drive 204
Kenwick Link	Beckenham	Kenwick	Maddington	State Route 30
Kewdale Road	Welshpool		Kewdale	
Kwinana Freeway	Perth	Cockburn Central	Baldivis	National Route 1 / State Route 2. Continues south to Ravenswood.
Leach Highway	Palmyra	Rossmoyne	Kewdale	National Route 1 / State Route 7
Loftus Street	Subiaco	Leederville	Mount Hawthorn	State Route 61
Lord Street	Perth	Highgate	Mount Lawley	State Route 51
Malaga Drive	Noranda		Malaga	
Mandurah Road	Kwinana Beach	Secret Harbour	Halls Head	National Route 1 / State Route 22
Manning Road	Manning	Bentley	Cannington	State Route 26
Marangaroo Drive	Marangaroo	Alexander Heights	Ballajura	State Route 81
Marmion Avenue	Karrinyup	Ocean Reef	Yanchep	State Route 71
Marshall Road	Dayton	Bennett Springs	Malaga	
Mirrabooka Avenue	Nollamara	Mirrabooka	Landsdale	
Mitchell Freeway	Perth	Osborne Park	Joondalup	State Route 2
Morley Drive	Balcatta	Dianella	Morley	State Route 76
Morley Drive East	Morley	Kiara	Eden Hill	State Route 76
Morrison Road	Woodbridge	Midvale	Swan View	National Route 1 / Tourist Drive 203
Mounts Bay Road	Crawley		Perth	State Route 5
Mundijong Road	Baldivis	Oldbury	Mundijong	State Route 22
Neaves Road	Carramar	Mariginiup	Bullsbrook	State Route 85 / Tourist Drive 359
Nicholson Road	Beckenham	Canning Vale	Oakford	State Route 31
North Beach Road	North Beach	Karrinyup	Gwelup	State Route 77
North Lake Road	Alfred Cove	Bibra Lake	Cockburn Central	
Ocean Reef Road	Ocean Reef	Edgewater	Landsdale	State Route 84 / Tourist Drive 204
Orrong Road	Rivervale		Welshpool	State Route 8
Patterson Road	Rockingham		Kwinana Beach	National Route 1 / State Route 18
Pearson Street	Floreat		Woodlands	State Route 64
Ranford Road	Canning Vale		Forrestdale	State Route 13
Reid Highway	North Beach	Malaga	Middle Swan	State Route 3
Riverside Drive	Perth		East Perth	State Route 5
Rockingham Road	Hamilton Hill	Henderson	Kwinana Beach	National Route 1 / State Route 14
Roe Highway	Middle Swan	Beckenham	Bibra Lake	National Highway 94 / National Highway 95 / State Route 3
Russell Road	Munster		Success	
Safety Bay Road	Peron	Safety Bay	Baldivis	State Route 18 / Tourist Drive 202
Scarborough Beach Road	North Perth	Innaloo	Scarborough	State Route 75
Selby Street	Wembley		Shenton Park	State Route 64
Shenton Avenue	Ocean Reef		Joondalup	
Shepperton Road	Victoria Park		East Victoria Park	State Route 30
South Street	South Fremantle	Murdoch	Canning Vale	State Route 13
South Western Highway	Armadale	Byford	Serpentine	State Route 20 / State Route 22 / Tourist Drive 205
Spearwood Avenue	North Coogee	Spearwood	Beeliar	State Route 14
Spencer Road	Langford		Thornlie	State Route 36
Stephenson Avenue	Osborne Park		Woodlands	State Route 64
Stephenson Avenue	Floreat		Mt Claremont	State Route 65
Stock Road	Attadale	O'Connor	Beeliar	National Route 1
Stirling Highway	Crawley	Claremont	Fremantle	State Route 5
Thomas Road	Kwinana Beach	Oakford	Byford	State Route 21
Thomas Street	Shenton Park		Subiaco	State Route 61
Tonkin Highway	Bullsbrook	Perth Airport	Oakford	State Route 4. Continues north to Muchea.
Toodyay Road	Middle Swan	Red Hill	Gidgegannup	State Route 50. Continues north-east to Toodyay.
Tydeman Road	North Fremantle		Fremantle Port	
Vahland Avenue	Riverton		Willetton	
Vincent Street	Leederville		Mount Lawley	State Route 72
Walcott Street	Mount Lawley	Menora	Coolbinia	State Route 75
Warton Road	Thornlie	Southern River	Banjup	
Welshpool Road	St James		Welshpool	
Welshpool Road East	Welshpool	Wattle Grove	Carmel	State Route 8
West Coast Highway	Cottesloe	City Beach	Karrinyup	State Route 71 / Tourist Drive 204
West Swan Road	Guildford	West Swan	Upper Swan	State Route 52 / Tourist Drive 203
Whitfords Avenue	Hillarys	Padbury	Woodvale	State Route 83 / Tourist Drive 204
William Street	Mount Lawley	Highgate	Perth	State Route 53
Yanchep Beach Road	Yanchep		Yanchep Beach	

== See also ==
- List of major roads in rural Western Australia
- List of highways in Western Australia
- List of road routes in Western Australia
