= Pedestrian scramble =

Traffic management concept

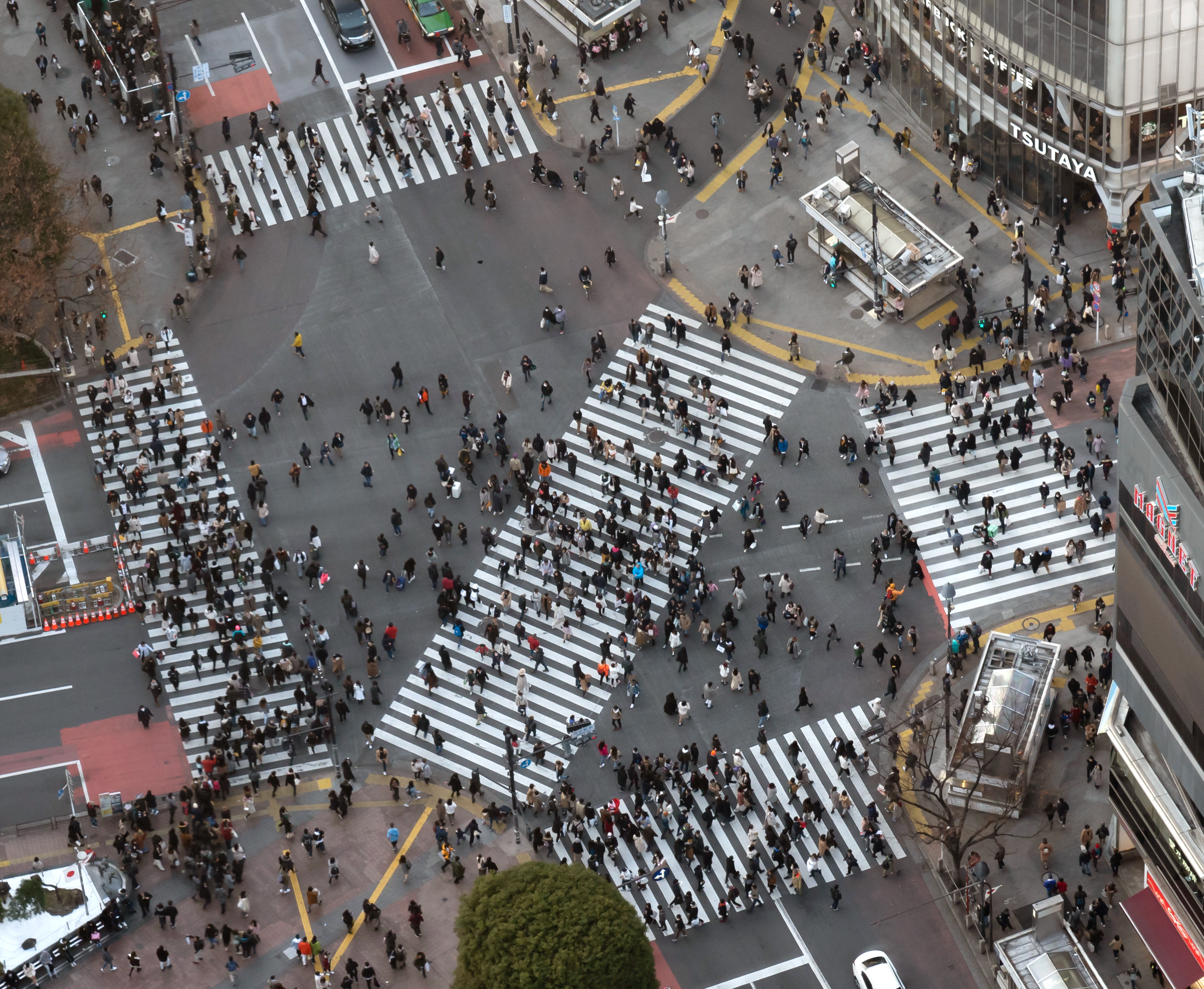
Shibuya Crossing, the world's most heavily used pedestrian scramble, at Hachikō Square in Tokyo

A pedestrian scramble (or exclusive pedestrian interval, or pedestrian jubilee) is a type of traffic signal movement that temporarily stops all vehicular traffic, thereby allowing pedestrians to cross an intersection in every direction, including diagonally, at the same time.

In Canada and the United States, the pedestrian scramble was first used in the late 1940s but fell out of favor with traffic engineers due to increased delays for pedestrians and drivers. Its benefits for pedestrian flow and safety have led to new examples being installed in many countries in recent years, including the world's busiest pedestrian intersection at Shibuya, Tokyo which began operation in 1973.

Names for the crossings in specific countries include scramble intersection, scramble crossings and scramble corner (Canada), 'X' Crossing (UK), diagonal crossing and Barnes Dance (US), and scramble crossing (スクランブル交差点, sukuranburu-kōsaten) (Japan).

== Development ==
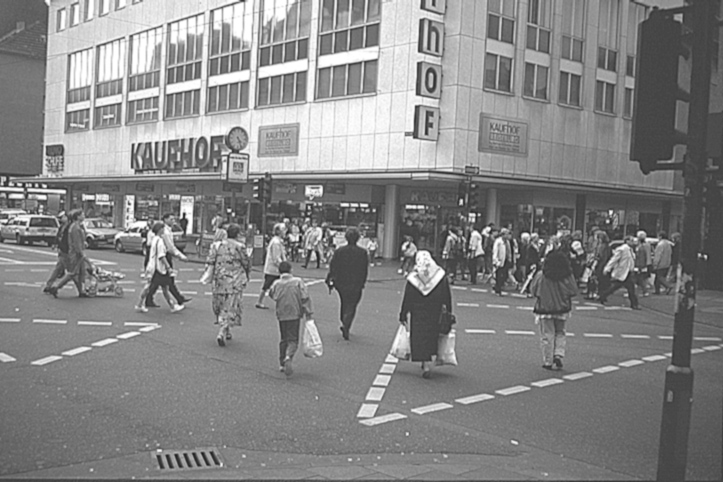
A scramble crossing in Cologne, Germany

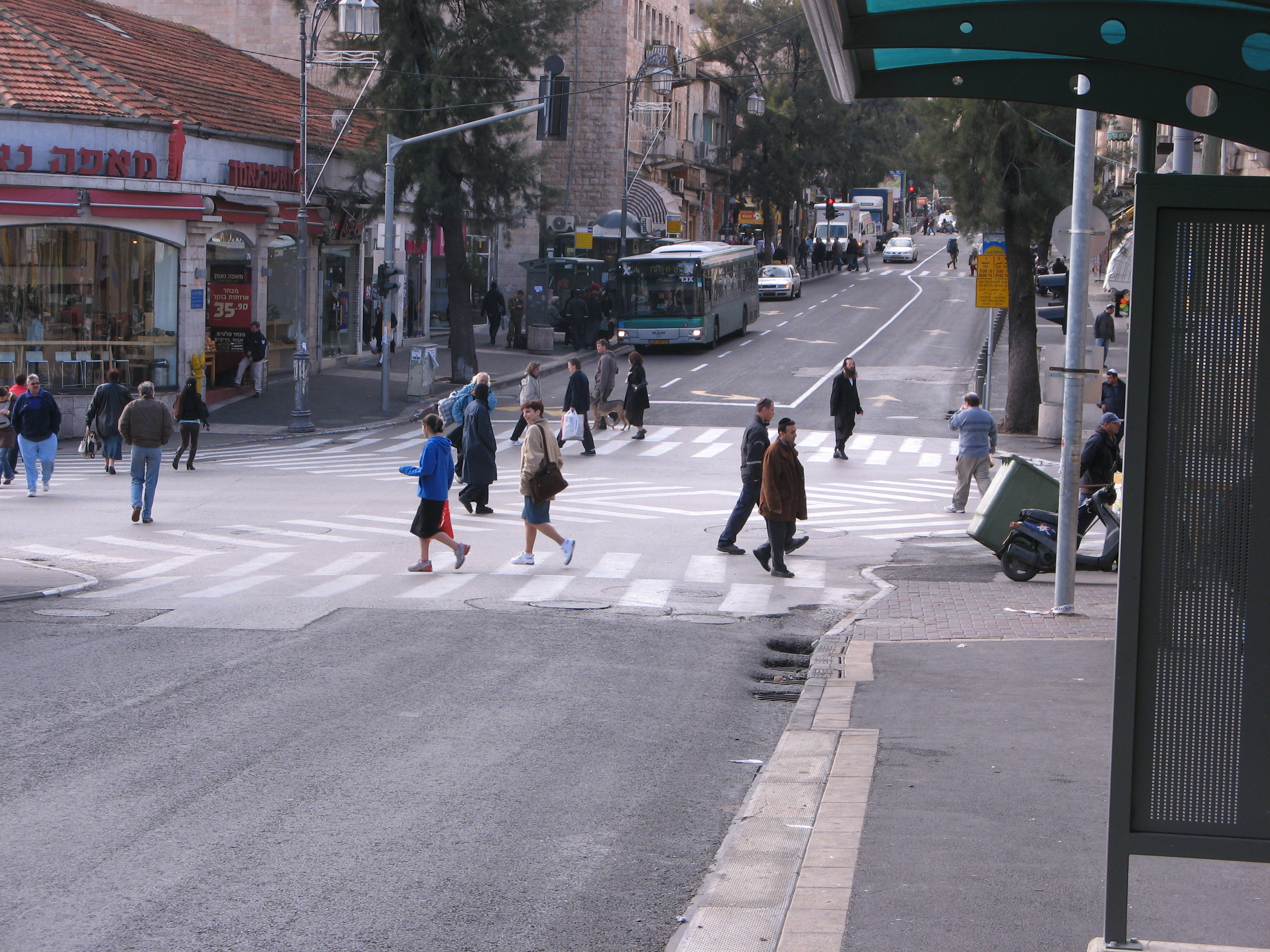
King George Street and Jaffa Road pedestrian scramble in Jerusalem (2007); it has since been dismantled following the construction of the Jerusalem Light Rail and the conversion of Jaffa road to a pedestrianized street

The name "Barnes Dance" commemorates traffic engineer Henry Barnes while alluding to a barn dance. While he did not claim to have invented it himself, Barnes was a strong advocate of it, having observed the difficulties his daughter experienced on her way to school. He first introduced it in his home city of Denver in the late 1940s. Around that time, the pedestrian scramble was being tested separately in Kansas City and Vancouver. Barnes later brought it to Baltimore and New York City. When he became traffic commissioner of New York City in 1962, his first action was to look for intersections to implement pedestrian scrambles. The first pedestrian scramble was installed ten days after he took office at the intersection of Vanderbilt Avenue and 42nd Street, to great acclaim. After the success of the first scramble, Barnes began adding more scrambles across the city, at Wall Street; 42nd Street at Fifth Avenue and at Madison Avenue; and in Brooklyn.

In his autobiography The Man With the Red and Green Eyes (1965), Barnes recalled that a City Hall reporter, John Buchanan, coined a phrase (dancing in the streets) writing that "Barnes has made the people so happy they're dancing in the streets." Barnes said later, "As things stood now, a downtown shopper needed a four-leaf clover, a voodoo charm, and a St. Christopher's medal to make it in one piece from one curbstone to the other. As far as I was concerned—a traffic engineer with Methodist leanings—I didn't think that the Almighty should be bothered with problems which we, ourselves, were capable of solving."

However, the Barnes Dance—officially known as an "exclusive pedestrian interval" because vehicular traffic is stopped in all directions during a pedestrian scramble—caused gridlock in some cities where it was implemented such as New York City, where congestion increased due to longer wait times for lights. Robert Moses disliked the scrambles because they held up traffic. In locations like Washington, D.C., pedestrian scrambles shorten the time allotted to each traffic-signal phase by one-third. One study of exclusive pedestrian intervals in Greenwich, Connecticut, found that it offered no extra benefits compared to a "concurrent pedestrian interval" where pedestrians cross when parallel traffic has the green light. In the United States, the 2009 Manual on Uniform Traffic Control Devices allows pedestrian scrambles.

== Application ==
=== In Australia ===
In Adelaide, there are scrambles at either end of Rundle Mall, King William Street, another on Pulteney Street, and one at the intersection of King William Street, Waymouth Street and Pirie Street. In Brisbane, there are two noteworthy scrambles: one in the central business district at the intersection of Adelaide and Edward streets, adjacent to the Queen Street Mall, and a second at the intersection of Vulture and Boundary streets in the suburb of West End. In Darwin, there is a pedestrian scramble at the CBD end of the Smith Street Mall.

In Melbourne, there is a pedestrian scramble at the intersection of Flinders and Elizabeth streets, at the Elizabeth Street entrance to Flinders Street railway station, allowing pedestrians to walk directly to the station and the island tram platforms in the middle of both streets. Since 2019, there has been a four-way scramble at the intersection of Wellington Street and Charles Street in Kew, due to school pedestrian traffic through the intersection. Another exists at the intersection of Mount Alexander Road and Wellington Street in Ascot Vale. A fourth scramble is at the intersection of Irving and Leeds streets, Footscray, next to Footscray railway station.

In Albury, there is a long-standing four-way scramble at the busiest CBD intersection, Dean Street and Kiewa Street. In Perth, pedestrian scrambles are mostly found in the CBD shopping area, at the intersections between two of Barrack, Hay, Murray and William streets. They are also found at the CBD intersections of St Georges Terrace, Mount and Milligan streets, and where St Georges Terrace becomes Adelaide Terrace at Victoria Avenue. The inner suburb of Mount Lawley has one where Beaufort Street intersects Walcott Street, and there is one in Leederville, at the intersection of Oxford and Vincent streets.

In Sydney, there are numerous examples of scramble crossings in built-up commercial and CBD areas, such as the intersection of George and Druitt streets, with one of the corner blocks being the Sydney Town Hall, at Oxford Street and Bourke Street in Darlinghurst, at Church Street in Parramatta, and in Penrith and Fairfield central business districts.

=== In Belgium ===
Pedestrian scrambles are planned to be legally introduced in autumn 2025.

=== In Canada ===
Pedestrian scramble in Toronto

Vancouver was one of the first cities worldwide to use the concept at individual locations.

Saskatoon had scramble crossings starting in the 1960s, along 21st Street at 2nd Avenue, 3rd Avenue, 1st Avenue, and College Drive. In spring of 1986, the last of them were abolished.

London, Ontario, had a scramble crossing in the 1960s at the intersection of Clarence and King streets. In Toronto, the intersection of Yonge Street and Dundas Street, the location of Sankofa Square, has the city's first installed scramble intersection and has since been joined by two more on Bloor Street at Yonge and Bay Streets in the downtown area. In 2015, Toronto has eliminated the Bay and Bloor scramble crossing after an evaluation study found 'modest positive benefits for pedestrians' and 'negative impacts to vehicular traffic'. The staff report also noted that sideswipe collisions at Bay and Bloor have more than doubled and rear-end type crashes have increased by 50% “likely due to increased driver frustration”. Kingston, Ontario, has a scramble crosswalk at the corners of Union Street and University Avenue to increase the safety of Queen's University students.

Quebec City also has a few pedestrian scramble intersections. Many intersections in Montreal, especially near downtown, activate the walk signal in all four directions at the same time, effectively creating pedestrian scrambles.

Calgary has two pedestrian scrambles in the Eau Claire neighbourhood. St. Albert, Alberta, has installed a test pedestrian scramble as of the end of May 2017. Banff also have a few pedestrian scramble intersections.

In 2018, Edmonton had four as part of a pilot project (two on Jasper Avenue; two on Whyte Avenue, with plans for a fifth at Rogers Place to be installed later that year. In 2021 another was installed at Gateway Boulevard and Whyte Avenue. But it was announced in March 2026 that at least some of them would be removed to allow the city's buses to run quicker. In Canada right turns are allowed on red lights when it is safe to do so and after coming to a complete stop, unless signs say otherwise, so scramble crossings may be more than usually desired.

=== In China ===
Shanghai as of 2018, has 11 major intersections equipped with pedestrian scrambles across the city in busy commercial areas. Beijing opened its first pedestrian scramble at the intersection of Lugu West Street and Zhengda Road in 2018. Two pedestrian scrambles opened in Haikou in 2019. Guangzhou has two pedestrian scrambles as of 2019. Pedestrian scrambles also exist in Hangzhou, Shenzhen, Changzhou, Nantong and Yichang. Hong Kong has numerous intersections operating with an exclusive pedestrian interval but not timed for the longer diagonal crossings and are not marked as such. Diagonal crossing at these de facto scramble crossings is illegal in Hong Kong.

=== In Finland ===
A pedestrian scramble appeared after some repairs in Turku's main square, between Eerikinkatu and Aurakatu.

=== In Japan ===
Pedestrian scramble at Shibuya Crossing in Tokyo

Pedestrian scrambles, known as a scramble crossing (スクランブル交差点, sukuranburu-kōsaten), are very common in Japan, where there are more than over 300 such intersections. Japan's largest and most famous scramble crossing is found in Tokyo, outside Shibuya station which was inaugurated in 1973. Over 3,000 pedestrians can cross in one scramble and has become a symbol of Tokyo and Japan as a whole. Sukiyabashi in Ginza is another large scramble crossing in Tokyo.

Kansai has many pedestrian scrambles, including four outside the north exit of Kyoto Station alone. Most of the diagonal crossings in Osaka are located in the south of the city, in Abeno ward.

The first pedestrian scramble to be installed in Japan was in the Kyushu city of Kumamoto in 1969. The scramble is located in the Kokaihonmachi district of the city's Chuo ward.

=== In Luxembourg ===
In the southern town of Dudelange, there is a pedestrian scramble at the busy intersection of the route de Kayl, route de Luxembourg and rue Gaffelt.

=== In Malaysia ===
Since June 2021, the local municipal and authority of capital Kuala Lumpur has created a Shibuya-style pedestrian crossing at the junction of Bukit Bintang, located in front of the iconic McDonald's Bukit Bintang outlet, just below the KL Monorail Line. This was done to increase the walkability in the area.

=== In Mexico ===
In downtown Tijuana diagonal pedestrian crossing with its own signal in the cycle has been applied at numerous intersections for decades. Currently the symbol to indicate pedestrian scramble is possible is a ribbon. In 2019 Mexico City installed its first pedestrian scramble in the Historic Center (Centro Histórico).

=== In the Netherlands ===
In the Netherlands, a version of the crossing, called a Simultaneous Green light for Bicyclists, combined with an all way green light for pedestrians, is currently being used in a number of intersections in the North and East of the Netherlands.

=== In New Zealand ===
Inspired by cities in North America, New Zealand began installing Barnes Dances in 1958, with the first being on Queen Street, Auckland, and soon in other cities as well. The Queen Street examples are Custom Street, Shortland, Wyndham, Victoria, and Wellesley Street intersections.

Over the next decade, Barnes Dance junctions became less popular, since they increased automobile congestion more than traditional pedestrian crossings did.

The Queen Street crossings remain today, despite early 2000s attempts to remove them for greater car priority, and have been extended with greater numbers of phases and pedestrian green times during the late 2000s.

Additionally, some Barnes Dance intersections do not provide painted crossings and are therefore de facto, such as the intersection of Grafton Rd and Symonds St within the University of Auckland city campus. Karangahape Road had two such crossings–the Queen Street / K Road intersection was modified in the 1990s but the Pitt Street / K Road intersection is still a Barnes Dance. On nearby Ponsonby Road there is a Barnes Dance at Franklin Road and there is a one on the Great North Road at the Surrey Crescent intersection with Williamson Avenue. There is a Barnes Dance at the multiple street intersection of Lake Road, Hurstmere Road, Northcroft Street and The Strand in Takapuna.

Barnes Dances also existed in several other cities in New Zealand, but have been gradually phased out. Barnes Dances exist in the South Island on Stafford Street in Timaru and three in the Christchurch CBD.

==== Dunedin ====
Dunedin had introduced Barnes Dance junctions by late 1960s, with all of them eventually being removed by the 1980s, with the last being removed at Cargill's Corner in South Dunedin.

In 2018, following growing pedestrian traffic in the city centre and "less than enviable" pedestrian and cyclist safety, as well as an existing need to do maintenance on traffic signals, Dunedin City Council announced the return of the Barnes Dance to the city. The initial plan proposed eight crossings, with more to be added depending on reception. Two more were quickly built. As of 2024, there are at least 13 Barnes Dance junctions in the city.

=== In the Philippines ===
In Taguig, there are two known pedestrian scrambles both in Bonifacio Global City: at the intersection of 30th Street and 3rd Avenue, and at the intersection of McKinley Parkway and 26th Street.

=== In Singapore ===
Pedestrian scramble in the Downtown Core of Singapore

On 16 November 1998, a scramble crossing was installed at the intersection of Robinson Road and Boon Tat Street, with its aim to reduce the waiting time for pedestrians crossing over to Lau Pa Sat. During the initial week of the launch, there was confusion between motorists and pedestrians, despite traffic police officers present at the location. The Land Transport Authority's then-manager for traffic management Lew Yii Der said that scramble crossings were "suitable only for small junctions that have a heavy pedestrian volume and where traffic flow is not so heavy". Till today, it is the only scramble crossing that exists in Singapore.

In December 2006, a six-month trial of a scramble crossing took place at the junction of Orchard Road and Bideford Road, with an aim to "test the potential of a scramble crossing with light projections becoming a feature of Orchard Road". However, the project was dropped as Singapore Tourism Board deemed it unsuccessful in achieving the objective of "generating buzz and interest".

Between December 2017 and January 2018, another trial of a scramble crossing was conducted, this time at the junction of Orchard Road and Cairnhill Road. The crossing drew mixed reactions from the public, with some praising the crossing as time-saving for pedestrians, whilst others criticizing it for causing confusion among pedestrians and motorists. The trial eventually concluded on 28 January 2018, but no official statements, articles or reports were published following its conclusion.

A three-month trial of a scramble crossing is undertaken from 16 November 2026 at the intersection of Joo Chiat Road and East Coast Road as part of an ongoing effort to improve traffic flow and pedestrian safety. If the trial is successful, the scramble crossing will become permanent.

=== In Sweden ===
In October 2020, the first diagonal crossing in Stockholm was opened at the intersection of Mäster Samuelsgatan and Regeringsgatan.

=== In Taiwan ===
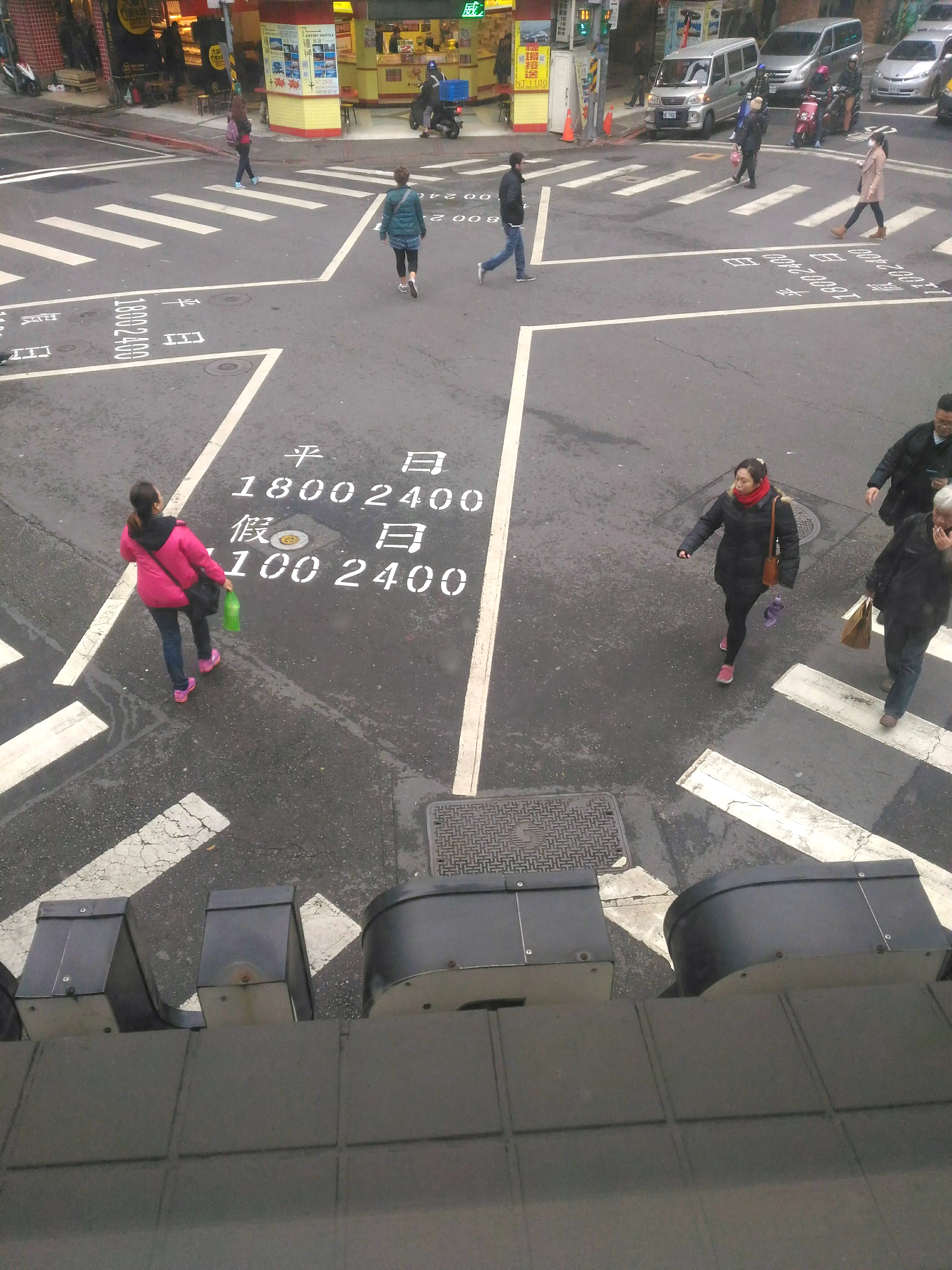
A pedestrian scramble at Chengdu Road and Kunming Street in the Ximending area of Taipei

In Taiwan, the word "pedestrian scramble" was translated to 行人專用時相 (xíngrén zhuānyòng shíxiāng) in Mandarin Chinese by the transportation authority.

In the 1990s, the first pedestrian scramble was implemented at the Qingdao West Road and Gongyuan Road intersection in Zhongzheng District of Taipei by the Taipei City Government. Subsequently, more cities have applied pedestrian scrambles to important intersections and downtown areas in Taiwan, including in New Taipei City, Taoyuan, Taichung, Tainan, Kaohsiung, Keelung, Hsinchu, Chiayi City, and Yilan County.

=== In the United Kingdom ===
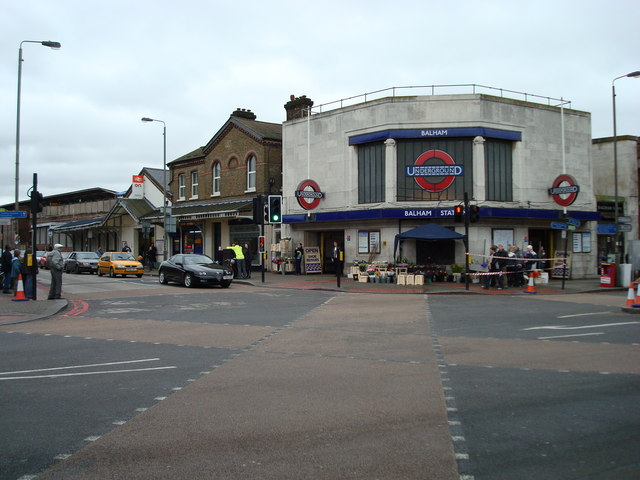
Diagonal crossing in Balham, England

The first formal diagonal crossing in the UK was opened in Balham town centre in 2005. The success of the Balham crossing was followed by conversion of the existing crossing facilities at Oxford Circus in 2009. Further diagonal crossings were constructed in Wood Green in 2010 and Wimbledon in 2012. Swansea opened a diagonal crossing in 2015.

=== In the United States ===
Kansas City was one of the first cities that used a pedestrian scramble system at a few locations. Denver formerly used the pedestrian scramble system at nearly every intersection in the downtown business district. The practice was eliminated in 2011, in order to "balance" resources allotted to pedestrians, vehicles, and mass transit. Exclusive pedestrian intervals were kept, but the diagonal crossing was made illegal.

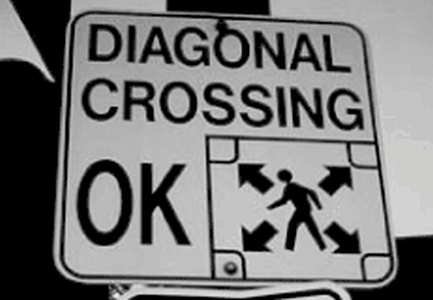
Sign for a pedestrian scramble in the United States

In Boston, most signalized intersections use an exclusive pedestrian phase, where vehicular traffic is stopped in all directions and it is possible for fast walkers to cross the street diagonally (even though the crosswalks are not marked as such). However, a growing number of traffic signals are being programmed to use a concurrent pedestrian phase. A similar situation exists in Cambridge, Massachusetts, where intersections with exclusive intervals can allow fast walkers to cross the street diagonally.

In Washington, D.C., diagonal crossing existed at several downtown intersections until the mid-1980s. It was tried again on an experimental basis at 7th and H streets Northwest in the Chinatown neighborhood beginning May 2010. In 2017, a second Barnes Dance crosswalk was added at Irving and 14th streets Northwest.

In New Haven, all of the intersections with traffic lights have implemented the pedestrian scramble, since at least 1974.

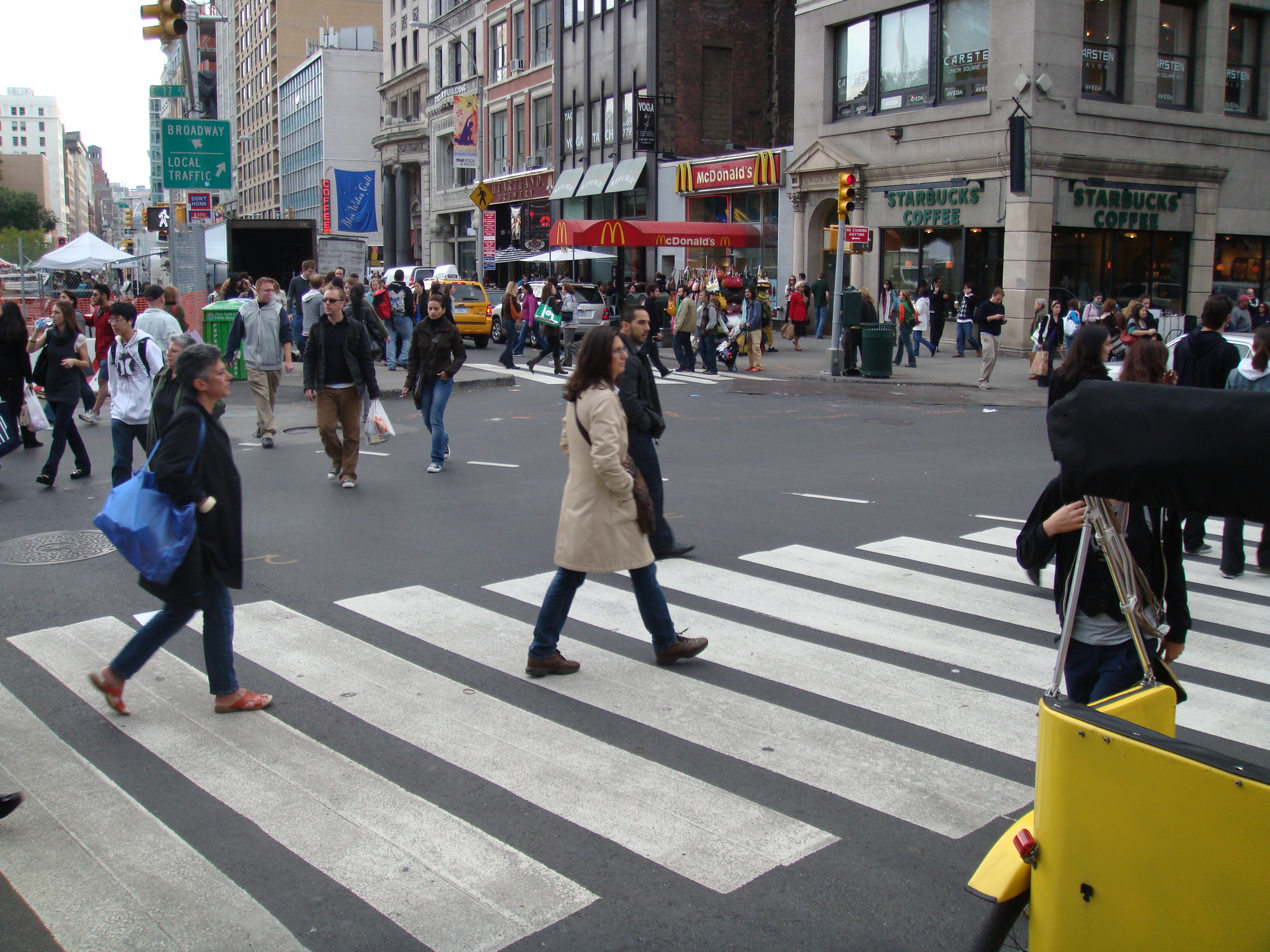
Pedestrian scramble at New York City's Union Square

In New York City, there were 635 intersections with exclusive pedestrian phases as of 2017, although the majority were "T-away" intersections (T-intersections where the cross street takes traffic away from the intersection) and mid-block crossings, where a pedestrian scramble was one of the two phases. Many of the remaining 86 intersections with pedestrian scrambles are located where intersection geometry is skewed, requiring diagonal crossings from pedestrians and/or an exclusive pedestrian phase due to conflicts with vehicular traffic. Major pedestrian scrambles include the intersection of Vesey Street, Broadway, Park Row, and Ann Street in Lower Manhattan, as well as at Nostrand Avenue and Flatbush Avenue in Midwood, Brooklyn.

Signals at several intersections in Pittsburgh, including along Craig Street at Centre Avenue, Bayard Street, Fifth Avenue, and Forbes Avenue near the University of Pittsburgh; on Forbes at Morewood Avenue at the main entrance to Carnegie Mellon University; and on Forbes at Murray and Shady Avenues in Squirrel Hill stop traffic from all directions and allow pedestrians to cross in all directions. They are not, however, specially signed; they use a standard pedestrian crossing light (with added audio signal for the visually impaired).

The signal at the intersection of McKinley and Riverside Avenues on the campus of Ball State University in Muncie, Indiana, is called the "Scramble Light" and is identified by the university as a campus landmark.

Athens, Ohio, has two diagonal crosswalks still in place (as of May 2022) at the intersection of Court and Union Streets in Uptown, near the Ohio University campus and at the intersection of Court and President Streets within the campus.

Some pedestrian scrambles are implemented only temporarily, during times when extremely high pedestrian traffic is expected. A notable example of that occurs on home-game Saturdays at the intersection of Main Street and Stadium Boulevard in Ann Arbor, Michigan, which is immediately adjacent to Michigan Stadium. Local police take control of the vehicular signals and indicate the pedestrian phase by playing Michigan's fight song, "The Victors."

The city of Honolulu on the island of Oahu in the state of Hawaii has installed multiple pedestrian scramble crossings in the Waikīkī neighborhood. There are at least three of these intersections along Kalakaua Avenue at Lewers St, Royal Hawaiian Avenue and Seaside Avenue.

On 31 May 2013, Chicago began testing a pedestrian scramble on the intersection of State Street and Jackson Boulevard. It is now permanent.

In Nevada, both Reno and Sparks have pedestrian scramble interchanges. Reno's is at the intersection of Virginia and 2nd Streets downtown to accommodate casino pedestrian traffic, and Sparks' are along Victorian Avenue to assist people in crossing to festivals that are held along that street.

Seattle uses the pedestrian scramble at 1st and Pike, 1st and University, 1st and Cherry, Beacon and 15th, 15th Ave NE and NE 40th St, and at the West Seattle Junction. The intersections are marked with a sign labeled "All Way Walk." Bellevue, Washington has one at 108th Avenue NE and the NE 6th Street pedestrian walkway, on the west side of Bellevue Transit Center. It is not signed as an all-way walk, but has pedestrian walk lights, and is accompanied by an auditory alert of "Walk sign is on for all crossings."

In California, San Francisco has several pedestrian scrambles along Stockton Street in Chinatown, Montgomery Street in the Financial District, as well as in several other locations. In Los Angeles County pedestrian scrambles are used in the Rodeo Drive commercial area of Beverly Hills; at the intersection of Westwood Boulevard and Le Conte Avenue as well as Weyburn and Broxton Avenues in the Westwood section of Los Angeles immediately adjacent to the UCLA campus; at the intersection of Hollywood Boulevard and Highland Avenue in Hollywood, and at the intersection of Jefferson Boulevard and McClintock Avenue near the University of Southern California. In the city of Santa Monica, 12 scramble crosswalks have been established in May 2016. In 1994, two scrambles were installed in Pasadena, Los Angeles County along Colorado Boulevard at two intersections: at DeLacey Avenue and at Raymond Avenue. In San Diego, one of the locations that uses pedestrian scrambles is at the intersection of Market Street and 5th Avenue, but the city does not plan to add any additional scrambles. Carlsbad added its first scramble in 2012, and the campus of UC Davis installed a bike/pedestrian scramble near its recreation center in 2014.

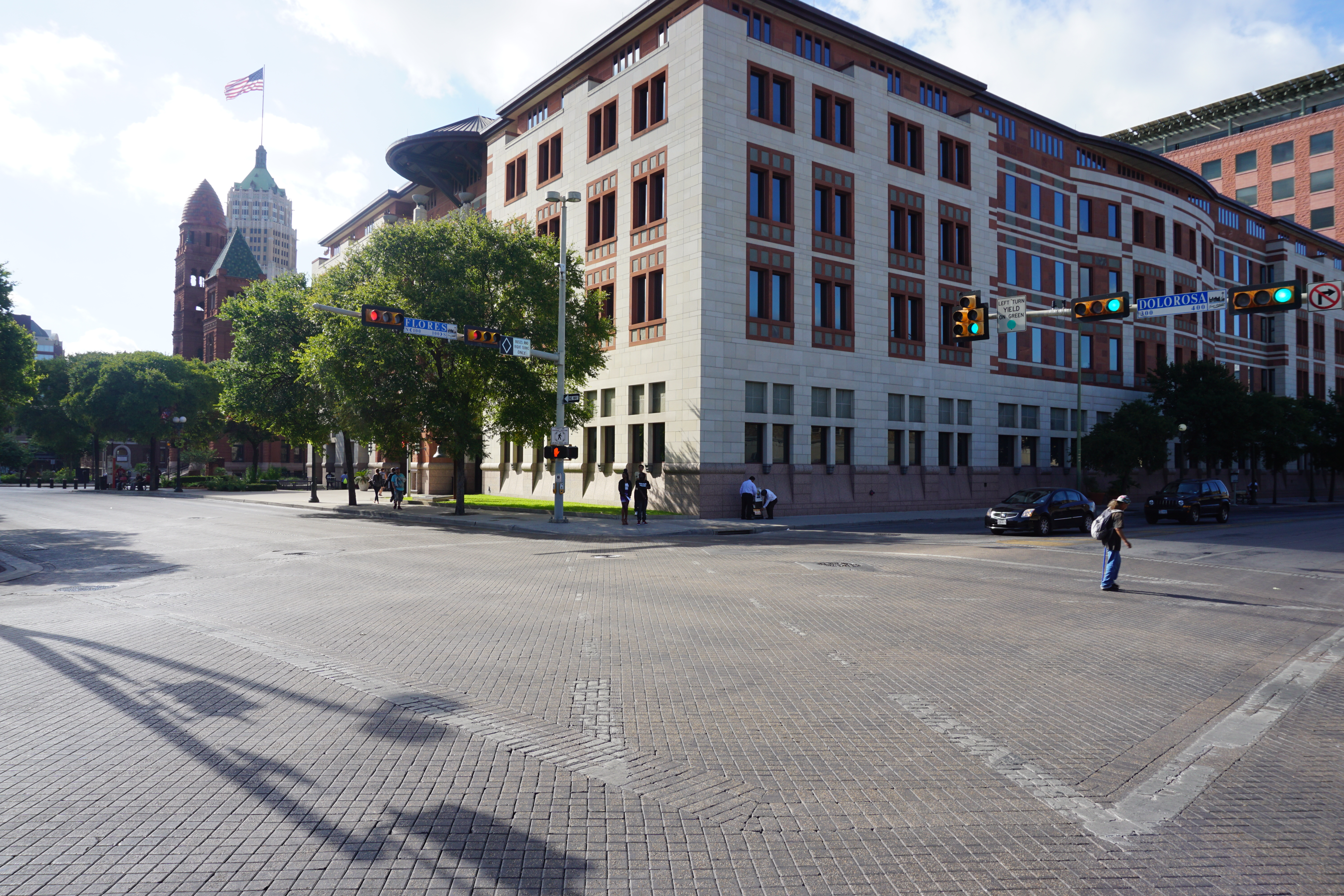
Pedestrian scramble at the corner of S Flores Street and Dolorosa in San Antonio

The City of El Paso, Texas, added pedestrian scramble markings to the intersection of Santa Fe Street and Main Drive in Downtown in April 2015. In San Antonio, there is also a pedestrian scramble at the intersection of Flores and Dolorosa Streets, which is just close to the city hall.

In Portland, Oregon, a pedestrian scramble was added in November 2015 to the intersection of NW 11th Avenue and NW Couch Street, near Powell's Books.

Multiple pedestrian scrambles were added in the downtown area of Broadway in Nashville in March 2016.

In 2019, a pedestrian scramble was added in the downtown area of Prescott, Arizona known as Whiskey Row.

A pedestrian scramble was opened at the intersection of 8th St and Brickell Ave in the Brickell neighborhood of Miami in 2022.

In 2023, the Tempe, Arizona city government tested a pedestrian scramble at the intersection of Mill Avenue and 5th Street, near the main campus of Arizona State University. The scramble was later made permanent.

== Advantages and disadvantages ==
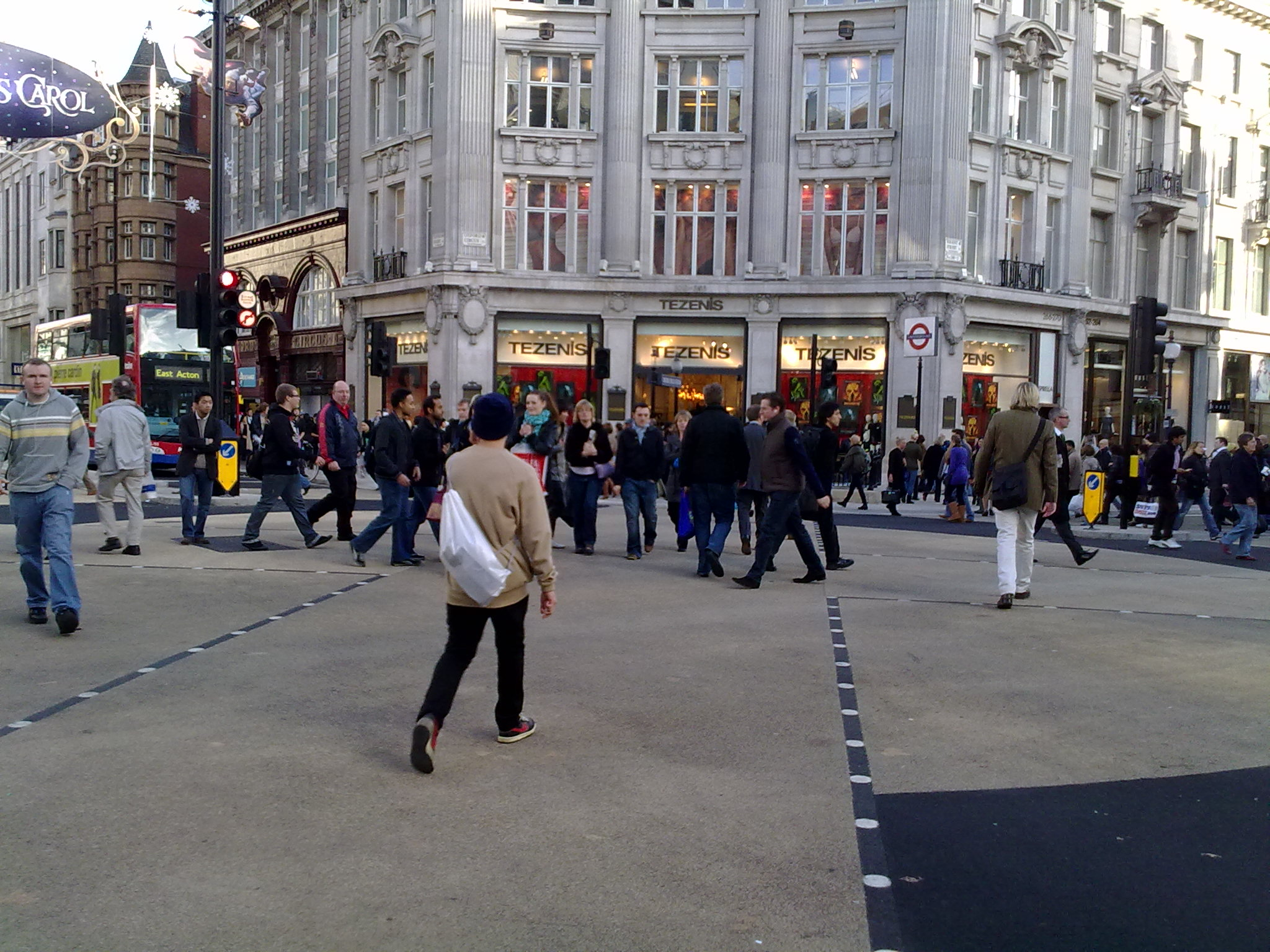
Oxford Circus in London with a new pedestrian scramble in November 2009

Research at Transport for London has suggested the installation of a diagonal crossing can reduce pedestrian casualties by 38%.

Since it stops all motor vehicles rather than allowing partial vehicle movements to coexist with partial pedestrian movements, the pedestrian scramble has sometimes been seen as inefficient by traffic engineers, with its removal believed to yield big savings in delays and congestion. It benefits drivers by eliminating concurrent pedestrian phases, allowing car traffic to make left or right turns without being blocked by pedestrians in the crossing. However, this also results in either longer wait times for both drivers and pedestrians, or shorter traffic-signal phases where less traffic could flow through an intersection in a single cycle.

Proper use requires that both drivers and pedestrians be aware of the traffic rules at such intersections. In some countries, that has led to a removal of at least individual installations. However, critics have dismissed these moves as further subordinating pedestrians to cars and consider the shared turns of motor vehicles and pedestrians as unnecessarily intimidating.

The pedestrian scramble may be used where large numbers of pedestrians are expected, and they will also have enough space to gather on the sidewalks in larger numbers. Under certain circumstances, pedestrian scrambles could reduce safety, as the average waiting times for pedestrians and car drivers are increased, thus creating more likelihood of people disobeying the signals.

== See also ==
- Pelican crossing
- Traffic light
