= William Street, Perth =

Street in CBD Perth, Western Australia

William Street, Perth Western Australia
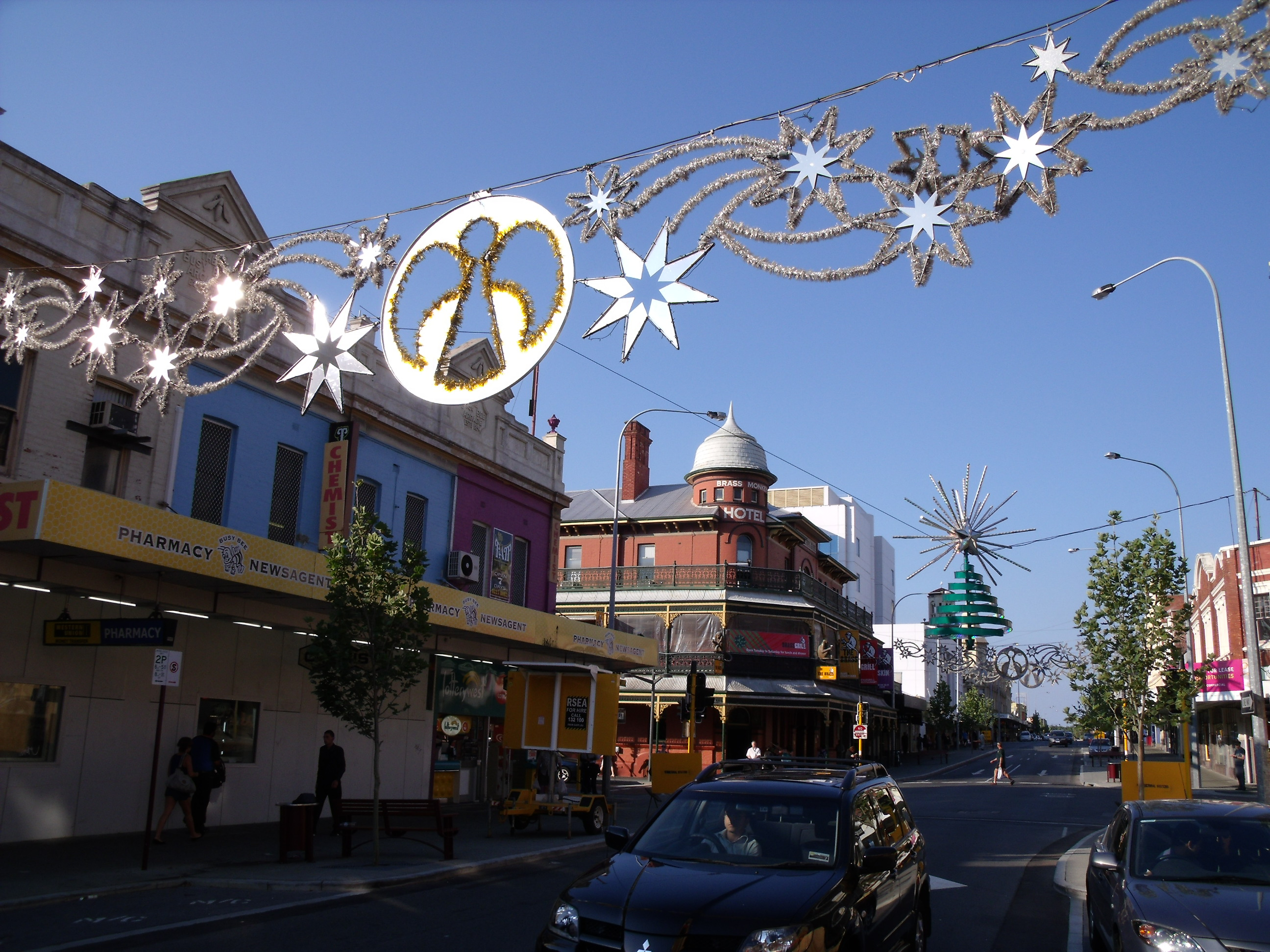
- William Street running through Northbridge

General information
- Type: Street
- Length: 3.5 km (2.2 mi)
- Route number(s): State Route 5 (Mounts Bay Road/The Esplanade to Birdiya Drive); State Route 53 southbound (Brisbane Street to Birdiya Drive, former)

Major junctions
- North end: Walcott Street (State Route 75), Mount Lawley
- Vincent Street; Wellington Street (State Route 65); St Georges Terrace
- South end: Birdiya Drive (State Route 5), Perth

Location(s)
- Suburb(s): Northbridge, Perth

William Street is a suburban distributor and one of two major cross-streets in the Perth central business district, Western Australia. Commencing in western Mount Lawley, its route takes it through the Northbridge café and nightclub district as well as the CBD.

== Route description ==
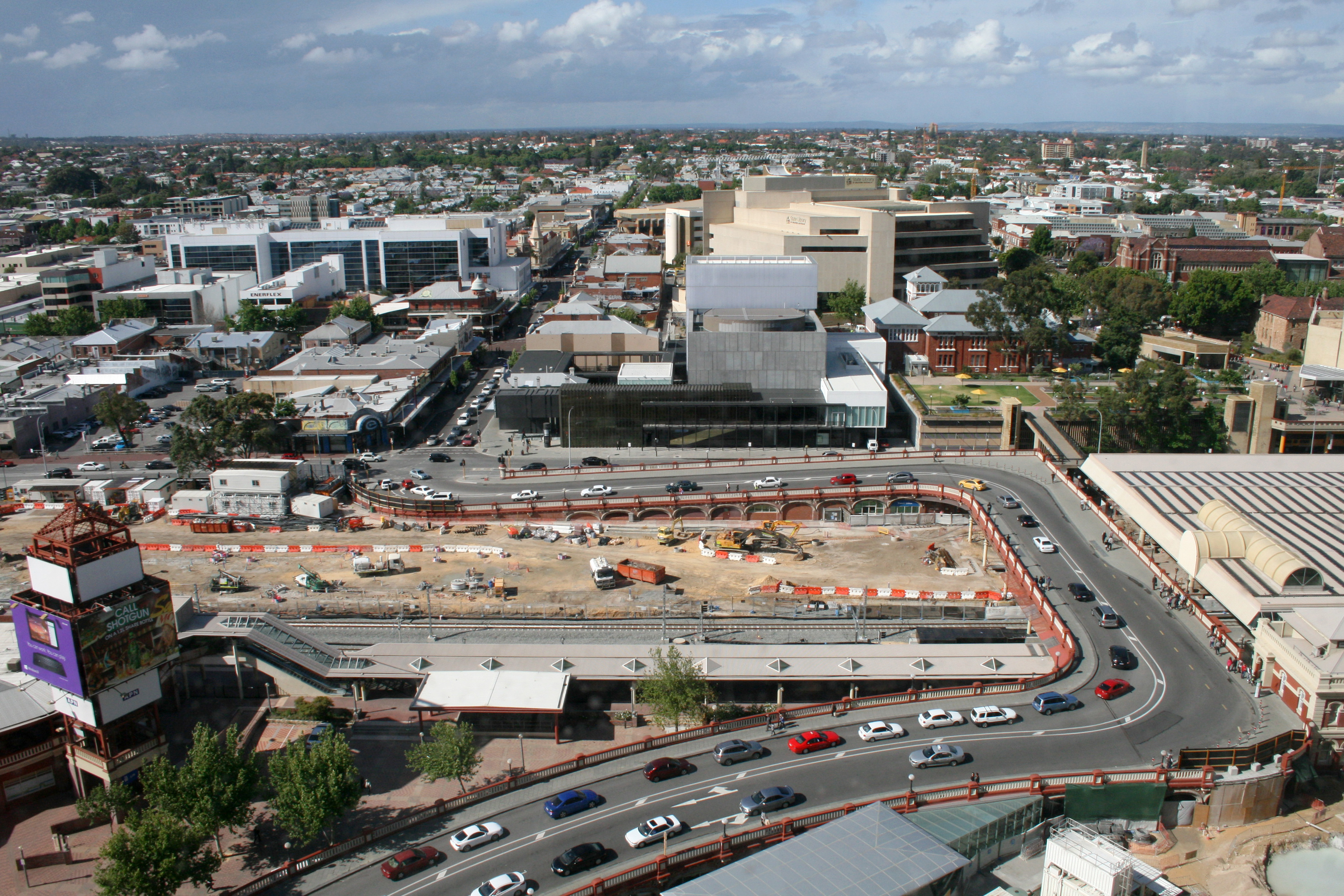
William Street runs along the Horseshoe Bridge which connects Northbridge with the Perth CBD

William Street's northern end is at Walcott Street in Mount Lawley and commences as a four-lane single carriageway. It travels southwest along one block, for 130 metres (430 ft), before turning southwards. After 600 metres (2,000 ft) it reaches Vincent Street, and the southern edge of Mount Lawley. The road continues in a south-south-westerly direction, at the eastern edge of Hyde Park and the western edge of Highgate. One block beyond the park, within the suburb of Perth, William Street intersects Bulwer Street, which connects to three parallel arterial roads – Lord Street, Beaufort Street, and Fitzgerald Street – as well as the major north–south road, Charles Street.

William Street realigns itself one block further east through a 220-metre-long (720 ft) reverse curve. At this point, it intersects Brisbane Street. Beyond Brisbane Street, the road reduces from four lanes to two and continues in a straight line for 900 metres (3,000 ft) to Roe Street, and is at the eastern edge of Northbridge from Newcastle Street to that point.

The Horseshoe Bridge takes the road between the Perth railway station and Yagan Square. Beyond the bridge, the road continues in its south-south-westerly direction through the Perth CBD. It intersects all the major east–west routes. At the southern end of the bridge is Wellington Street. This is followed by Murray and Hay streets, which are pedestrian malls to the east; and then St Georges Terrace, which is a through-route for vehicular traffic. One more block takes it to an intersection with Mounts Bay Road, to the west, and The Esplanade to east. After one more block, alongside the Elizabeth Quay bus station and Elizabeth Quay railway station, the road ends at Birdiya Drive. This intersection also connects a Mitchell Freeway exit ramp and Kwinana Freeway southbound entrance ramp, components of the Narrows Interchange.

=== Public transport ===
William Street is serviced by Transperth buses running through Northbridge. Most of these services deviate via Elizabeth Quay bus station before continuing to their destination. Underneath part of William Street is the William Street tunnel, which carries the Mandurah and Yanchep railway lines.

=== Buildings ===
There is an entrance to 108 St Georges Terrace on William Street. Wesley Church is on the corner of William Street and Hay Street. At 427 William Street is the Perth Mosque, the oldest mosque in Perth, which opened in 1906. Australia Place is further down William Street. There is a 24-hour McDonald's, as well as a KFC and Hungry Jack's. Both sides of William Street between Wellington Street and Hay Street have recently been redeveloped, Raine Square on the west and Gordon Stephenson House on the east side of the street.

Although their addresses are on adjacent streets, 108 St Georges Terrace, the Gledden Building, the Palace Hotel and Walsh's Building are all on the corners along William Street. Wentworth Hotel is on the corner with Murray Street

In 2009 the East Perth Redevelopment Authority was involved in redeveloping six properties on the eastern side of William Street, between Roe and Newcastle Streets.

St George's Anglican Grammar School is at 50 William Street.

== History ==
The street formerly directly passed over the Fremantle and Joondalup railway lines at the Horseshoe Bridge. These lines were later sunk as part of the Perth City Link project but the bridge remains. A ramp that took William Street traffic from The Esplanade onto the southbound Kwinana Freeway was closed in 2004 during the construction of Esplanade railway station.

=== Traffic direction ===
William Street began as a two-way street, and during the era of trams, there were tram lines along it. On 4 March 1973 it became a one way street in a southerly direction in a pairing arrangement with Barrack Street between Brisbane Street and The Esplanade when the Wellington Street bus station opened.

In the late 20th century and early 21st century, William Street was two-way north of Brisbane Street, and one-way southbound on the other side. All southbound traffic from Beaufort Street was redirected via Brisbane Street to William Street as the southbound component of State Route 53. In 2008, the section between The Esplanade and Wellington Street returned to two-way traffic. Further conversion occurred in 2010, when the Horseshoe Bridge was changed back to two-way traffic, and in 2013 the section between the bridge and Newcastle Street was converted. The final section, between Newcastle and Brisbane Streets, was converted to two-way in late 2019. As a result of the conversion both directions of State Route 53 were transferred to Beaufort and Barrack Streets. Since 2014, William Street now carries State Route 5 south of The Esplanade due to the Elizabeth Quay development.

== Major intersections ==
All intersections listed are signalised unless otherwise mentioned.

LGA	Location	km	mi	Destinations	Notes
Stirling–Vincent boundary	Mount Lawley	0.0	0.0	Walcott Street (State Route 75) - Coolbinia, Menora, North Perth, Maylands	Northern terminus
Vincent	Mount Lawley-Highgate-Perth tripoint	0.7	0.43	Vincent Street - Leederville, Hyde Park	
Vincent	Perth	1.3	0.81	Bulwer Street (State Route 72) – Leederville, Wembley, City Beach	
Vincent	Perth	1.5	0.93	Brisbane Street	No right turn permitted between William Street north and Brisbane Street east.
Vincent–Perth boundary	Perth-Northbridge boundary	1.9	1.2	Newcastle Street – Leederville	Access to Graham Farmer Freeway
Perth	Perth-Northbridge boundary	2.0	1.2	Aberdeen Street	No right turns permitted from William Street to Aberdeen Street in both directions.
Perth	Perth-Northbridge boundary	2.2	1.4	Francis Street	
Perth	Perth-Northbridge boundary	2.3	1.4	James Street	No right turns permitted from William Street to James Street in both directions.
Perth	Perth-Northbridge boundary	2.4	1.5	Roe Street – Northbridge, West Perth	
Fremantle railway line, Yagan Square		2.4– 2.7	1.5– 1.7	Horseshoe Bridge	
Perth	Perth	2.7	1.7	Wellington Street (State Route 65) – West Perth, East Perth	No right turns permitted except for William Street south to Wellington Street west. No left turn permitted for William Street south to Wellington Street east.
Perth	Perth	2.8	1.7	Murray Street Mall east / Murray Street west	
Perth	Perth	3.0	1.9	Hay Street Mall east / Hay Street west – West Perth, Subiaco	Hay Street is one-way westbound
Perth	Perth	3.1	1.9	St Georges Terrace – Kings Park, West Perth, Subiaco, Victoria Park	No right turn from St Georges Terrace west to William Street north.
Perth	Perth	3.3	2.1	Mounts Bay Road westbound / The Esplanade (State Route 5) eastbound - Kings Park, Fremantle, Victoria Park	State Route 5 concurrency terminus. No right turn from The Esplanade west to William Street north and William Street south to Mounts Bay Road west. No left turn from William Street north to Mounts Bay Road West.
Perth	Perth	3.5	2.2	Mitchell Freeway (State Route 2) - Stirling, Joondalup, Yanchep	Northbound entry and southbound exit ramps only. No left turn permitted from William Street north to Mitchell Freeway east.
Perth	Perth	3.7	2.3	Birdiya Drive (State Route 5) - Crawley, Fremantle Rockingham	Southern terminus at sharp bend. Access to Kwinana Freeway entry ramp.
1.000 mi = 1.609 km; 1.000 km = 0.621 mi: Incomplete access; Route transition
