= Newcastle Street, Perth =

Street in Perth, Western Australia

Newcastle Street Western Australia
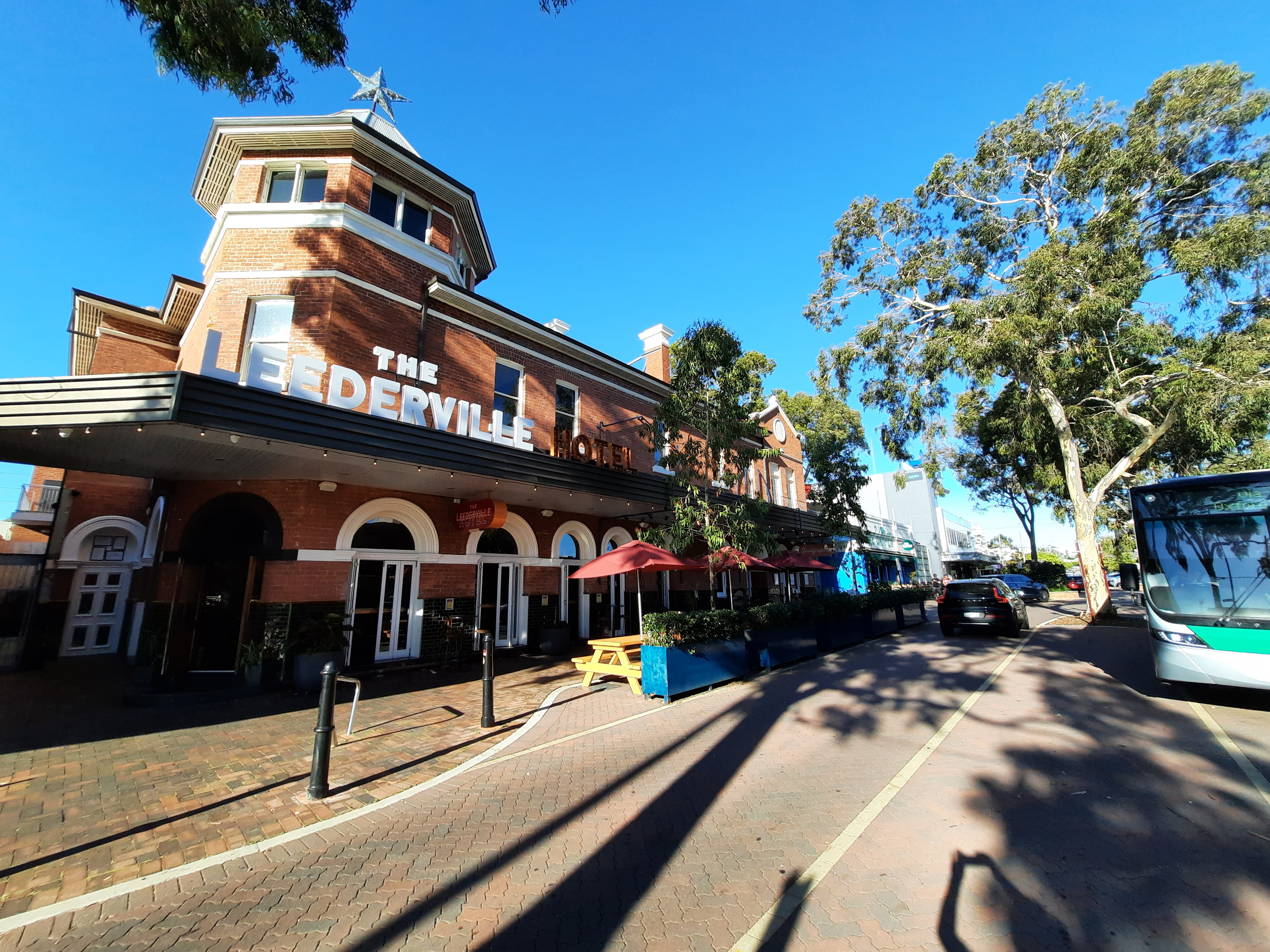
- Leederville hotel on the corner of Newcastle Street and Oxford Street

General information
- Type: Road
- Length: 3 km (1.9 mi)

Major junctions
- East end: Graham Farmer Freeway (State Route 8); Lord Street (State Route 51)
- Beaufort Street (State Route 53); William Street (State Route 53); Fitzgerald Street; Mitchell Freeway (State Route 2) / Charles Street (State Route 60); Loftus Street (State Route 61)
- West end: Oxford Street

Location(s)
- Major suburbs: Perth, Northbridge, West Perth, Leederville

Newcastle Street is a road in Perth, Western Australia. It connects Leederville with East Perth, starting from Oxford Street and ending at Lord Street, crossing a number of roads leading north out of Perth including Loftus Street, Charles Street, Fitzgerald Street, William Street, and Beaufort Street.

== History ==
Newcastle Street is named after Henry Pelham-Clinton, 5th Duke of Newcastle, who was Secretary of State for the Colonies from 1852 to 1854.

It has been in the past parts of major bus routes leaving Perth. The tramline (closed in the 1950s) along William Street also crossed Newcastle Street.

The street has also been identified in name, by schools and businesses. The Newcastle Street State School was at 478–482 Newcastle Street. It was sometimes also named the Newcastle Street Infants School, as well as the Newcastle Street Primary School or even Newcastle Street School.

It has been in the scope of the Northbridge Urban Renewal project.

== Major intersections ==
LGA	Location	km	mi	Destinations	Notes
Perth - Vincent boundary	Perth	0	0.0	Graham Farmer Freeway (State Route 8)	Freeway westbound exit ramp only; ramp continues after traffic lights as Newcastle Street; traffic lights shared with Lord Street
Perth - Vincent boundary	Perth	0	0.0	Lord Street (State Route 51)	Traffic light controlled; traffic lights shared with Graham Farmer Freeway ramp
Perth - Vincent boundary	Perth	0.4	0.25	Stirling Street	Traffic light controlled
Perth - Vincent boundary	Perth	0.55	0.34	Beaufort Street (State Route 53)	Traffic light controlled
Perth - Vincent boundary	Perth - Northbridge boundary	0.85	0.53	William Street (State Route 53)	Traffic light controlled.
Perth - Vincent boundary	Northbridge - Perth - West Perth tripoint	1.6	0.99	Fitzgerald Street	Traffic light controlled
Perth - Vincent boundary	West Perth - Northbridge boundary	1.8	1.1	Mitchell Freeway (State Route 2)	Freeway southbound entry and northbound exit ramps only; ramps continue after traffic lights as Charles Street
Perth - Vincent boundary	West Perth - Northbridge boundary	1.8	1.1	Charles Street (State Route 60)	Traffic light controlled; no right turn from Newcastle Street westbound onto Charles Street northbound or Charles Street southbound onto Newcastle Street westbound; Charles Street continues after traffic lights as freeway ramps and Charles Street Bus Bridge
Vincent	West Perth	2.2	1.4	Cleaver Street	Traffic light controlled; no through traffic on Cleaver Street, Cleaver Street southbound is left-only to Newcastle Street eastbound; no right turn from Newcastle Street westbound to Cleaver Street northbound (except buses)
Vincent	West Perth - Leederville boundary	2.5	1.6	Loftus Street (State Route 61)	Traffic light controlled; no right turn from Loftus Street southbound onto Newcastle Street westbound
Vincent	Leederville	3	1.9	Oxford Street	
1.000 mi = 1.609 km; 1.000 km = 0.621 mi: Incomplete access
