= Lord Street, Perth =

Road in Perth, Western Australia

Lord Street, Perth Western Australia

General information
- Type: Road
- Length: 2.1 km (1.3 mi)
- Route number(s): State Route 51 (north of Wellington Street)

Major junctions
- North end: Guildford Road (State Route 51); Walcott Street (State Route 75)
- Bulwer Street (State Route 72); Graham Farmer Freeway (State Route 8); Wellington Street (State Route 65)
- South end: Victoria Square, Perth

Location(s)
- Major suburbs: Mount Lawley, Highgate, East Perth

Lord Street is a road in East Perth, Western Australia. It starts from Victoria Square near Royal Perth Hospital and runs north-east for 2.1 kilometres (1.3 mi) to end at Walcott Street, Mount Lawley.

The street formerly extended south to the Swan River, with Victoria Avenue being the new name as of 1903 for the section south of Victoria Square. Lord Street crosses Moore, Wellington and Wittenoom Streets.

Lord Street used to cross the Armadale and Midland railway lines east of Perth station, at the Lord Street level crossing. Automatic boom gates were installed in 1960 with the signal box closed. With the development of the Northbridge Tunnel, and railway upgrades, a bridge was built to cross the works, just east of McIver station by Concrete Constructions in 1999.

The easternmost point of Newcastle Street is at Lord Street. Perth Oval lies on the west side of Lord Street at the intersection with Bulwer Street. The final northern part of Lord Street changes into Guildford Road just south of the Mount Lawley subway.

== Intersections ==
LGA	Location	km	mi	Destinations	Notes
Vincent–Stirling boundary	Mount Lawley	0	0.0	Walcott Street northwest (State Route 75) / Guildford Road northeast (State Route 51) – Guildford, Maylands, North Perth, Yokine	Northern terminus at traffic light controlled t-junction. Continues as Guildford Road
Vincent	Perth	0.9	0.56	Bulwer Street (State Route 72) west / Summers Street east – Leederville, Wembley, City Beach	Access to East Perth railway station
Vincent	Perth	1.3	0.81	Parry Street west / Graham Farmer Freeway (State Route 8) east – Burswood, Welshpool, Perth Airport	Eastbound entry ramp only via signalised intersection with East Parade to the east
Vincent–Perth boundary	Perth-East Perth boundary	1.5	0.93	Newcastle Street west / Graham Farmer Freeway (State Route 8) east – Northbridge, Leederville, Perth Airport	Westbound exit ramp only via signalised intersection with East Parade to the east
Perth	Perth-East Perth boundary	1.8	1.1	Moore Street west / Wittenoom Street (State Route 51) east	Lord Street converts to one-way northbound. Southbound traffic diverts to Wittenoom Street.
Perth	Perth-East Perth boundary	2.0	1.2	Wellington Street (State Route 65) – West Perth, East Perth	State Route 51 southern terminus
Perth	Perth	2.1	1.3	Victoria Square	Lord Street southern terminus, northern continuation from Victoria Avenue
1.000 mi = 1.609 km; 1.000 km = 0.621 mi: Incomplete access; Route transition
