= Charles Street, Perth =

Road in Perth, Western Australia

Coordinates: 31°55′39″S 115°51′09″E

Charles Street, Perth Western Australia
- travelling Charles from Green street to Newcastle street

General information
- Type: Road
- Length: 3.7 km (2.3 mi)
- Opened: 1853
- Route number(s): State Route 60

Major junctions
- South end: Mitchell Freeway (State Route 2); Newcastle Street
- Vincent Street (State Route 72); Scarborough Beach Road
- North end: Green Street (State Route 75) / Walcott Street (State Route 75); Wanneroo Road (State Route 60)

Location(s)
- Major suburbs: West Perth, North Perth, Joondanna

Charles Street is a major road in the inner northern suburbs of Perth, Western Australia. It runs from Newcastle Street and extends up to London Street, providing a connection between Mitchell Freeway and Wanneroo Road. It is the southern section of part of State Route 60, which continues north along Wanneroo Road.

== History ==
The street was named after Captain Charles Fitzgerald, Governor of WA, 1848–55. The section of Charles Street from Carr Street to Walcott Street was originally an extension of Wanneroo Road. Its name appears for the first time on maps of the Land Department in 1853.

Access to Perth and its markets was a very important factor in the early years of the settlement (Swan River Colony), and Charles Street (leading onto the northern track) became an important road during the 1870s...The Methodist Church established a Chapel in Charles Street in 1895 and a more substantial building was added in 1897. St Paul’s Anglican Church was also erected in Charles Street in 1897, and in the 1920s a new church building was constructed on the corner of Charles and Carr streets.

In October 2022, Main Roads began a planning study to upgrade Charles Street with grade-separated "duck and dive" interchanges (effectively single-point diamond or roundabout interchanges in which the intersection is at-grade and the free-flowing road is below ground) at its busy Vincent Street, Scarborough Beach Road, and Walcott Street intersections. However, after community opposition to the required demolition of about 100 properties, the study was abandoned in November 2022.

== Major intersections ==
All intersections listed are signalised unless otherwise mentioned.

LGA	Location	km	mi	Destinations	Notes
Stirling	Joondanna–Yokine boundary	0.0	0.0	Wanneroo Road (State Route 60) – Lancelin, Wanneroo northwest / London Street (State Route 61 – Leederville, Subiaco, Nedlands southwest	Northern terminus; road continues north as Wanneroo Road; Traffic light controlled y-junction with no right turn possible between London and Charles Street south.
Stirling	Joondanna–Yokine-Coolbinia tripoint	0.3	0.19	Wiluna Street – Nollamara	Connects to Flinders Street. No right turn possible between Wiluna and Charles Street north.
Vincent–Stirling boundary	Joondanna–Coolbinia–North Perth–tripoint	0.5	0.31	Green Street westbound / Walcott Street eastbound (State Route 75) – Scarborough, Innaloo, Osborne Park, Mount Lawley	No right turn permitted from Green Street to Charles Street south.
Vincent	North Perth	2.0	1.2	Scarborough Beach Road westbound / Angove Street eastbound – Scarborough, Innaloo, Osborne Park, Mount Hawthorn	
Vincent	North Perth–West Perth boundary	3.0	1.9	Vincent Street (State Route 72) – City Beach, Wembley, Leederville, Highgate	
Vincent	West Perth	3.4	2.1	Carr Street	No right turns permitted from Charles to Carr Street from either direction.
Vincent–Perth boundary	West Perth–Northbridge boundary	3.7	2.3	Newcastle Street – Leederville, Perth	Traffic light controlled; no right turn from Newcastle Street westbound onto Charles Street northbound or Charles Street southbound onto Newcastle Street westbound.
Vincent–Perth boundary	West Perth–Northbridge boundary	3.7	2.3	Mitchell Freeway (State Route 2) – Cockburn Central, Rockingham, Mandurah	Southern terminus of Charles Street. Continues as freeway southbound entry and northbound exit ramps only as well as the Charles Street Bus Bridge after traffic lights as part of the Hamilton Interchange
1.000 mi = 1.609 km; 1.000 km = 0.621 mi: Incomplete access; Note: Intersections with minor local roads are not shown
