= Guildford Road =

Road in Perth, Western Australia

Guildford Road Western Australia
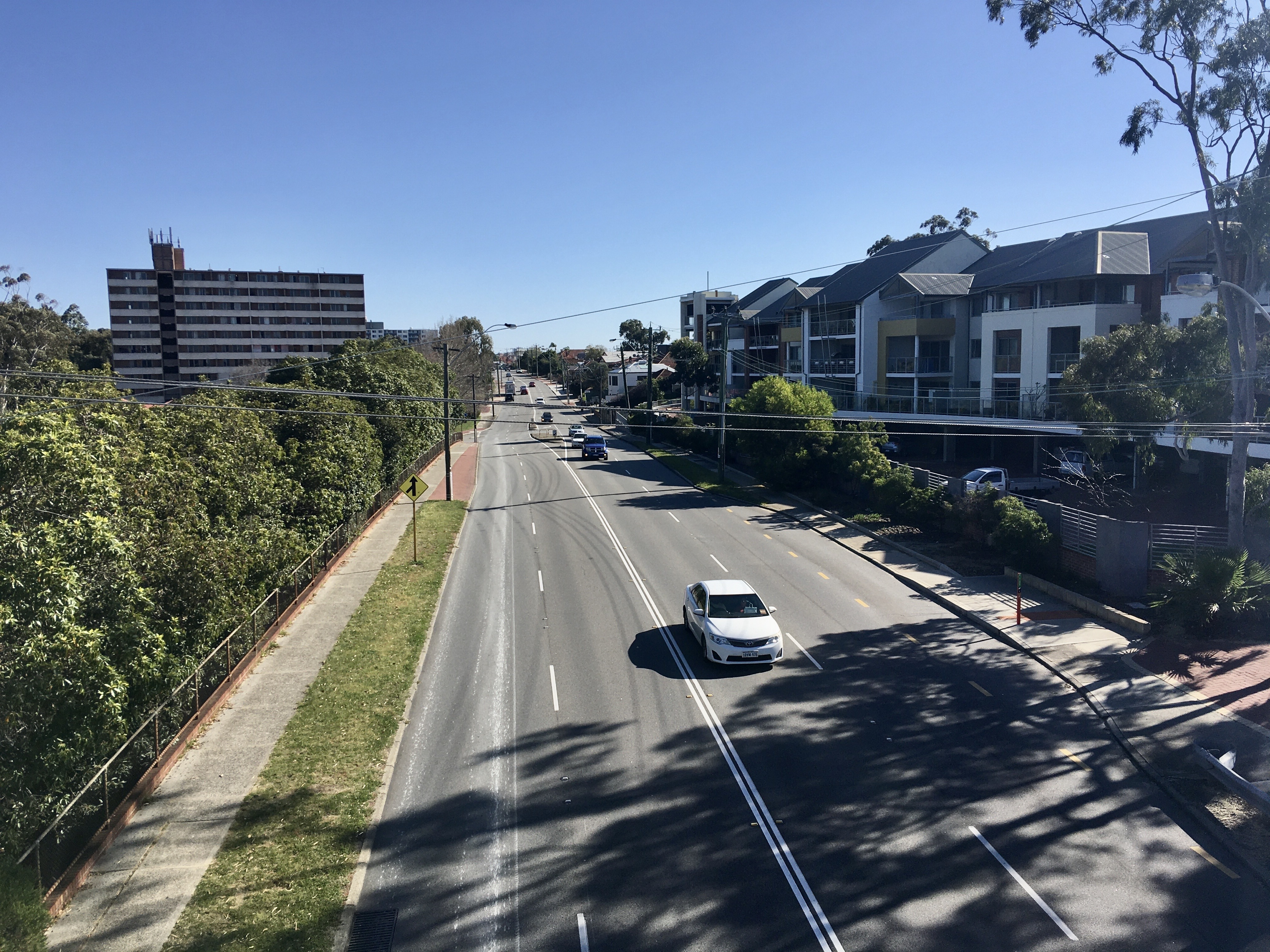
- Guildford Road viewed from Sixth Avenue footbridge in Maylands
- Map of Perth with Guildford Road highlighted in red

General information
- Type: Road
- Length: 9.2 km (5.7 mi)
- Opened: 1830s
- Route number(s): State Route 51

Major junctions
- Southwest end: Lord Street (State Route 51), Mount Lawley
- Walcott Street (State Route 75); East Parade (State Route 66); Garratt Road (State Route 55); Tonkin Highway (State Route 4)
- Northeast end: Bridge Street (State Route 51), Bassendean

Location(s)
- Major suburbs: Maylands, Bayswater, Ashfield

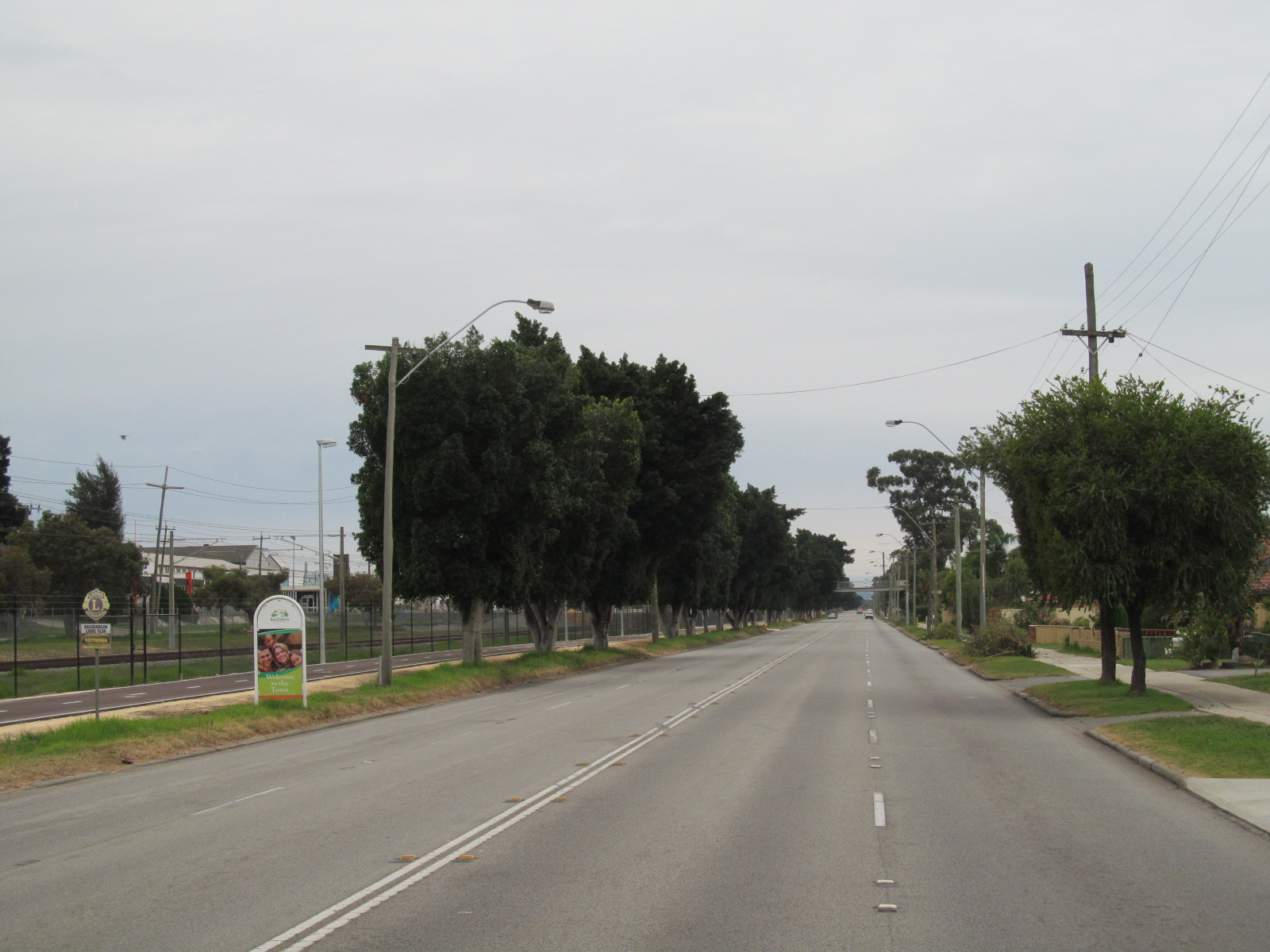
View north-east along Guildford Road in Ashfield. The Midland railway line is located next to the road.

View westbound from Bridge Street to West Road, past Bassendean Oval

Guildford Road is a major road in Perth, Western Australia, linking the inner-city suburb of Mount Lawley with Guildford in the north-east. The ten-kilometre-long (6.2 mi) road runs mostly parallel to the Swan River, on its northern side, and is part of State Route 51, which runs between Perth's CBD and Midvale. Guildford Road is maintained and controlled by Main Roads Western Australia, which uses the internal designation "H026 Guildford Road" for Guildford Road, as well as Bridge Street and James Street in Guildford. In the 1930s, the name Great Eastern Highway was coined to describe the road, but was actually used for the road on the other side of the Swan River.

== Route description ==
Guildford Road westbound in Bassendean

Guildford Road begins at a three-way junction with Lord Street and Walcott Street in Mount Lawley. It runs in a north-easterly direction, passing under the Midland railway line at the Mount Lawley Subway, and continuing through the residential areas of Maylands and Bayswater After a folded diamond interchange with Tonkin Highway, the road follows the Midland railway line to Bassendean. A short distance after the intersection with West Road and Bassendean Oval, the road narrows to a single lane in each direction, and Guildford Road becomes Bridge Street. Bridge Street crosses the Swan River via the Guildford Road Bridge, connecting to Guildford's main road, James Street.

== History ==
=== Origins ===
A road to Guildford was constructed in the 1830s, shortly after the founding of the Swan River Colony. Lieutenant Dale was appointed, and paid a salary, to construct a road and some small bridges. At a special meeting of the Agricultural Society on 8 April 1834, the quality was criticised as "the work of a rough carpenter", and that works finished at the road leading to the private residence of the Colonial Secretary. The following week the comments regarding the extent of the works was described as erroneous, as there was some distance from the completed section to the branch road, and that "workmen were taken off the road at the express recommendation of the Agriculturists, to enable them to procure labourers during the harvest-time".

By September 1840, the road was in a "shameful state" of disrepair, with many owners of horses for hire refusing to let their animals travel on the road. The local newspaper, The Perth Gazette and Western Australian Journal, speculated that the reason for the neglect was the road on the southern side of the Swan River would soon be open, and warned that until then, the cost of public injuries would likely be ten times the cost of necessary repairs.

=== Naming ===
The name Great Eastern Highway was coined by the Perth Road Board in December 1933. It was suggested for the Perth to Guildford road on the north side of the Swan River (modern-day Guildford Road), as an alternative to the Bassendean Road Board's proposal, Perth Road. In February 1934, the Bassendean Road Board agreed to the name, as Perth Road would be too general, and the road was considered the main artery serving eastern districts, all the way through to Kalgoorlie. Other local governments in the area considered the issue over the next few months. The Bayswater Road Board and Greenmount Road Board were in favour of the idea, but Guildford Road Board was opposed, as several local road names would be lost. Greenmount, and public advertising, thereafter referred to the road as Great Eastern Highway, and the council wrote to the Main Roads Department, requesting the name change be gazetted. This prompted Main Roads to write to other local governments, advising of the request and soliciting their views. The Mundaring Road Board and Kellerberrin Road Board were supportive, while the Kalgoorlie Road Board suggested Great Eastern Goldfields Highway. The Kalgoorlie Municipal Council agreed that the road should be known as a highway, but thought the name was inadequate for a road that only connected Midland Junction with Coolgardie. The Midland Junction Municipal Council opposed the renaming, citing "sentimental and practical reasons for the continuance of the use of the old name".

In August 1934, the Bassendean Road Board applied to Lands Department to change the portion of the Perth–Guildford road within its district to Great Eastern Highway. The department refused the request, reasoning that most traffic bound for Midland used the Causeway and travelled on the south side of the Swan River, and that therefore the Perth–Guildford road should not be part of the main highway. Despite this setback, the Perth Road Board organised a local government conference to consider renaming the road from Perth to Guildford. The issue was considered important, as losing the name to the south side of the river would divert traffic away from the old established centres to the north. The straightening of dangerous bends and the replacement of an old bridge between Bassendean and Guildford were also to be considered. The conference, held on 7 September 1934, was attended by representatives of the Perth, Bayswater, Bassendean, and Guildford road boards, and the Midland Junction Council. Guildford and Midland Junction were still opposed to the renaming, but the others were supportive. Motions that passed included submitting a rename proposal to the state government, urging the government to construct a new bridge at Bassendean, and approaching the government to have the road declared a main road.

In November 1934, the state government Land Council contacted the local governments on the south side of the Swan River, asking them to rename the roads that make up the Causeway–Midland route as Great Eastern Highway. Both the Perth City Council and Belmont Park Road Board agreed to the request. This created a "peculiar situation", as described by the Royal Automobile Club, with roads both north and south of the Swan River proposed to be renamed as Great Eastern Highway. Despite the name change not being official, some residents along the road through Belmont started describing their properties as located on Great Eastern Highway.

Another conference of the local governments north of the river was held in December 1934. They decided to continue to pursue renaming the Perth–Guildford road to Great Eastern Highway, and having it gazetting as a main road. A letter from Commissioner of Main Roads had stated that the road through Belmont was considered the principle highway to the eastern states. He therefore recommended that if the name Great Eastern Highway were to be applied west of Midland Junction, it should be to that road, as the road through Bassendean was not considered a main road. Traffic counts collected by the Bassendean Road Board, however, showed that the north of river route, through Bassendean, carried more traffic in both directions than the southern route, through Belmont – 54% compared to 46%. The northern route was also shorter by about two miles (3.2 km), and considered by the local governments to be the "natural entrance to the city", only crossing the Swan River once and not again at the Causeway.

On 8 January 1935, representatives from the local governments north of the river urged Minister for Lands, Michael Troy, to rename the Perth–Guildford road through those areas as Great Eastern Highway. Despite the route being shorter and carrying more traffic, he refused. He said that it was not gazetted as main road, and a previous decision to rename the road through Belmont as Great Eastern Highway was made after considering the facts, and at the request of the Main Roads Board. There was resentment and an objection over the name being "pinched" from the Perth Road Board. The minister disregarded the objection. He advised the representatives to see the Minister for Works to get the road declared a main road, and then approach him with new name. This resolved Great Eastern Highway's route, with the local governments north of the river pursuing other names such as Main Highway.

=== Upgrades and improvements ===
The Mount Lawley Subway had two main issues in its history, flooding during heavy rains and "narrowness" created an ongoing issue until its widening. The section near Bassendean has also been improved. As late as 1968, Guildford Road was aligned through Bassendean, curving multiple times. In the 1970s, it was realigned to the northern edge of the town centre, with the previous alignment renamed as Old Perth Road. Old Perth Road has existed as a distinct road since at least 1992.

During February 2016, work was completed to add additional turning lanes and install guardrails at the intersection with Tonkin Highway

On 6 January 2017, the Western Australian Planning Commission (WAPC) revealed plans to widen Guildford road from East Parade to Tonkin Highway by up to 10 metres (33 ft). A median strip was to be installed along the route, as well as on road cycling lanes for sections. Bus queue jump facilities were also going to be installed at intersection along the route. However, the road would remain as 2 lanes in each direction. Residents and businesses along the route criticised the plans, saying that they will lose parts of their yards, or businesses as a result of land being resumed due to the widening. They also questioned why another cycle path was needed in the area, because there are already two nearby, and said that there wasn't enough consultation by the WAPC. The Department of Planning's director-general Gail McGowan defended the plans by saying that there is a three-month public submissions period to the amendment, and that the widening was needed to improve safety. She also added that it was only the first part of a long consultation process, and that it was unlikely that the upgrade will be done that year. After a change of government, on 2 June 2017, the planning minister announced that the plans were scrapped.

== Junction list ==
LGA	Location	km	mi	Destinations	Notes
Vincent–Stirling boundary	Mount Lawley	0.0	0.0	Lord Street (State Route 51) – Perth, East Perth southwest / Walcott Street (State Route 75) – Osborne Park, Scarborough northwest	Guildford Road south western terminus; Road continues southwest as Lord Street; Traffic light controlled t-junction
Vincent–Bayswater boundary	Mount Lawley	0.2	0.12	East Parade (State Route 66) – East Perth south / Whatley Crescent – Maylands, Bayswater north	Traffic light controlled intersection with a reverse jughandle turning lane from Guildford Road northeast to East Parade south
Bayswater	Mount Lawley	0.8	0.50	First Avenue north / Thirlmere Road – Mount Lawley Hospital	First Avenue and Thirlmere Road one way in; Traffic light controlled intersection
Bayswater	Maylands	1.8	1.1	Eighth Avenue – Maylands	Traffic light controlled intersection
Bayswater	Bayswater	3.4	2.1	Garratt Road (State Route 55) – Dianella, Belmont	Traffic light controlled intersection
Bayswater	Bayswater	4.2	2.6	King William Street – Bayswater, Morley	Traffic light controlled intersection
Bayswater	Bayswater	5.1	3.2	Tonkin Highway (State Route 4) – Armadale, Joondalup, Perth Airport	Folded diamond interchange
Bayswater	Bayswater	5.5	3.4	to Railway Parade – Bayswater, Bassendean	Traffic light controlled t-junction
Bassendean	Bassendean	7.2	4.5	Collier Road – Bassendean, Morley	Traffic light controlled t-junction
Bassendean	Bassendean	7.9	4.9	Old Perth Road – Bassendean	Traffic light controlled t-junction
Bassendean	Bassendean	8.6	5.3	West Street – Bassendean south / Lord Street – Lockridge, Beechboro north	Traffic light controlled intersection
Bassendean	Bassendean	9.2	5.7	Bridge Street (State Route 51) – Guildford, Midland, Mundaring	Guildford Road north eastern terminus; Road continues as Bridge Street

== See also ==
- List of major roads in Perth, Western Australia
