= Guildford Road Bridge =

Traffic bridge in Perth, Western Australia

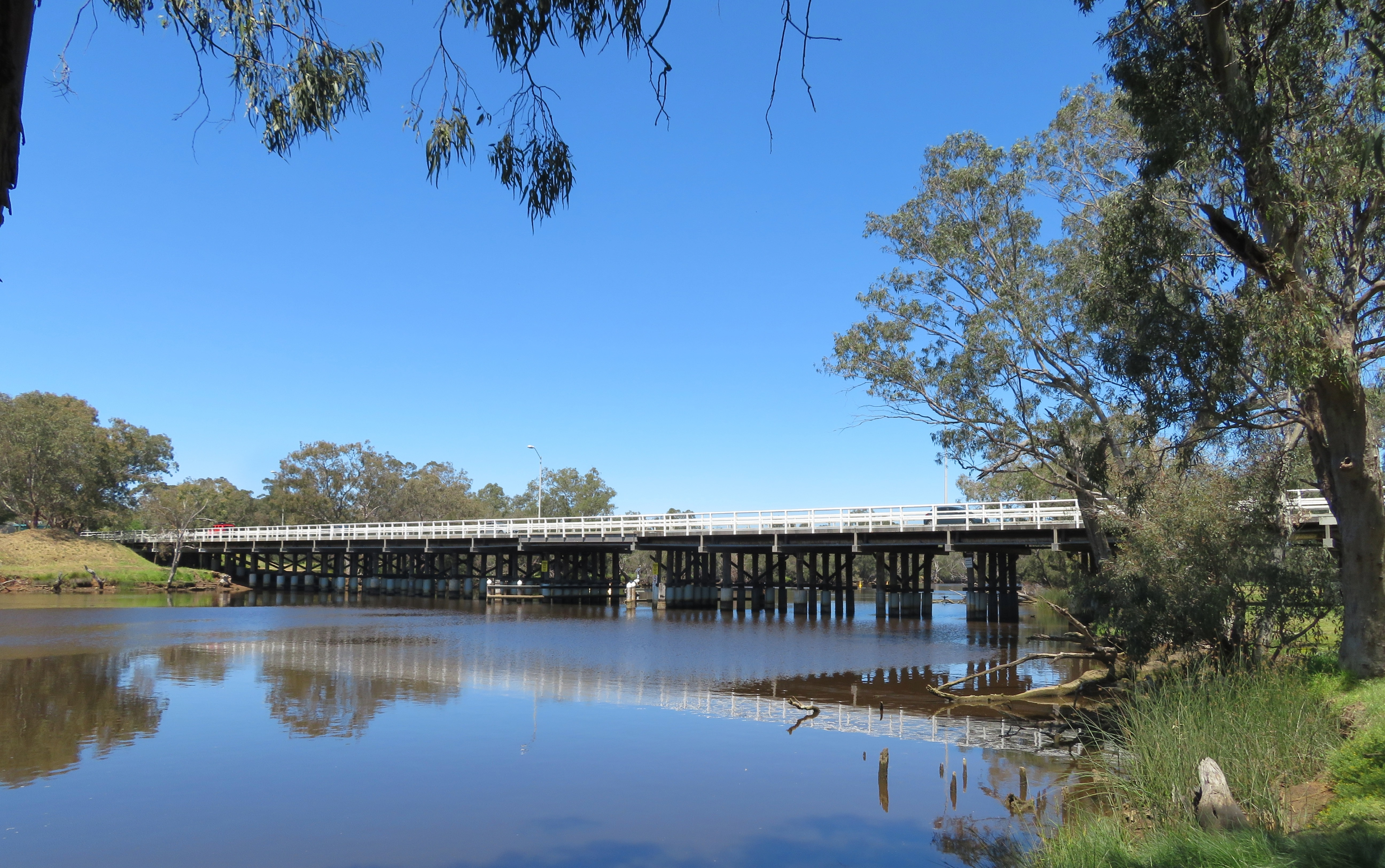
- Guildford Road Bridge in 2025
- Coordinates: 31°54′0.914″S 115°57′40.388″E
- Carries: Road vehicles
- Crosses: Swan River
- Locale: Guildford, Western Australia

Characteristics
- Design: E.W. Godfrey
- Total length: 140 m (460 ft)
- Width: 7.77 m (25.5 ft)

History
- Opened: 1937

Location
- Interactive map of Guildford Road Bridge

Guildford Road Bridge is a state heritage-listed road bridge connecting the Perth suburbs of Bassendean and Guildford via Guildford Road and Bridge Street (State Route 51) across the Swan River in Western Australia. It has also historically been known as Bassendean Bridge. It was given heritage status by the Heritage Council of Western Australia in November of 2005 and was classified by the National Trust that same year.

== History ==
The current site of the Guildford Road Bridge has been a crossing point on the Swan River since the early colonial period, serving as a link between the Swan River settlements of Perth and Guildford. A ferry service operated there as early as 1831, and a horse ferry by 1834.

The first permanent bridge at the location, a timber structure, was completed in 1885–1886 at a cost of £600. It was demolished in 1904 and a second replacement bridge was built in 1905 at a cost of £1770. The current bridge was first proposed in the late 1920s, due to an increase in traffic and the deterioration and maintenance costs of the previous bridge. More serious discussions continued into the early 1930s about the state of disrepair, but a lack of funding and disputed responsibility between local authorities continued to delay the project.

In 1935, formal approval for a new bridge was given by the Main Roads Board and construction began in 1936. While it was temporarily opened to traffic for a brief period that year, it was again closed by August, with traffic diverted through the old route due to wet weather. It was eventually completed in late 1937, with the former structure being demolished shortly afterwards.

By the late 1970s, the bridge had over 27,000 vehicles crossing it per day. In 1978, the original gravel and bitumen surface was reinforced with a concrete deck, and paved with an asphalt. In 1994, the bridge was widened to incorporate two dual-use paths for pedestrians and cyclists.

== Design and structure ==
The bridge is 140.2 metres in length and 7.77 metres wide, consisting of 21 bays approximately 6.096 metres in length and a navigation span of 12.192 metres. It is primarily made from timber and concrete with a jarrah substructure. The original design featured a two-lane roadway that was 5.69 metres wide, along with a 1.52-metre wide footpath. It was designed by E.W. Godfrey, Transport Engineer for the Main Roads Department from 1928 to 1957.

== Guildford railway bridges ==
The site also includes the nearby Guildford Railway Bridges, running parallel to the traffic bridge and servicing the Midland line and the Eastern Railway route to Kalgoorlie.

== See also ==
- Guildford Road
- Guildford Railway Bridge
