= Vincent Street, North Perth =

Road in Perth, Western Australia

Vincent Street Western Australia
- Coordinates: 31°56′10.8″S 115°50′18.8″E (West end); 31°56′11.9″S 115°52′14.3″E (East end)

General information
- Type: Street
- Location: Perth
- Length: 2.95 km (1.8 mi)
- Opened: c.1876
- Route number(s): State Route 72

Major junctions
- West end: Mitchell Freeway, Leederville Parade
- East end: Beaufort Street

Location(s)
- LGA(s): City of Vincent
- Major suburbs: Leederville, North Perth, West Perth, Perth

Vincent Street is a street in Perth, Western Australia. It runs west-east, separating the suburbs of West Perth and Perth from North Perth and includes Mount Lawley.

The street is believed to have been named by the chief draftsman in the Lands Department, George Vincent, after himself in about 1876. Vincent was the recipient of the land on the north side of the street, east of Charles Street, in the first Crown Grant, Swan Location 816, of Perth. The local government area City of Vincent was named after the street (on which the city council chambers are located).

Notable places along Vincent Street include:

- Luna Leederville cinema
- Leederville Oval
- Beatty Park Leisure Centre
- Redemptorist Monastery
- Hyde Park

== Major intersections ==
All intersections listed are signalised unless otherwise mentioned.

LGA	Location	km	mi	Destinations	Notes
Vincent-Cambridge boundary	Leederville-West Leederville boundary	0.0	0.0	Mitchell Freeway (State Route 2) northbound / Southport Street southbound	Western terminus at modified diamond interchange. Continues westbound as Lake Monger Drive (State Route 72). Northbound exit ramp terminates at Southport Street. Southbound entry ramp looped.
Vincent-Cambridge boundary	Leederville-West Leederville boundary	0.25	0.16	Mitchell Freeway (State Route 2) / Leederville Parade southbound	Western terminus at modified diamond interchange. Continues westbound as Lake Monger Drive (State Route 72). Northbound exit ramp terminates at Southport Street. Southbound entry ramp looped.
Vincent	Leederville	0.4	0.25	Oxford Street – Mount Hawthorn	No right turn permitted between Vincent Street east and Oxford Street south or Oxford Street north and Vincent Street east. No right turn permitted between Vincent Street west and Oxford Street north during peak hours.
Vincent	North Perth–West Perth-Leederville tripoint	0.9	0.56	Loftus Street (State Route 61) – Joondanna, Nedlands, Crawley	Access to Graham Farmer Freeway
Vincent	North Perth–West Perth boundary	1.5	0.93	Charles Street (State Route 60) – Lancelin, Wanneroo, Yokine	
Vincent	North Perth–West Perth boundary	1.6	0.99	Bulwer Street (State Route 72)	Unsignalised. State Route 72 eastern concurrency terminus. No right turn permitted between Bulwer Street and Vincent Street east.
Vincent	West Perth–North Perth–Perth tripoint	2.0	1.2	Fitzgerald Street (State Route 56) – Gnangara, Dianella, Northbridge	No right turn permitted between Vincent Street east to Fitzgerald Street south.
Vincent	Mount Lawley-Highgate-Perth tripoint	2.8	1.7	William Street – Northbridge, Perth, Hyde Park	
Vincent	Mount Lawley	3.2	2.0	Beaufort Street (State Route 53) – Bedford, Inglewood, Highgate, Perth	Eastern terminus at unsignalised intersection; no right turn permitted between Vincent Street and Beaufort Street south.
1.000 mi = 1.609 km; 1.000 km = 0.621 mi: Incomplete access; Route transition
