= William Henry Leeder =

William Henry Leeder was an early settler in the Swan River Colony, Western Australia. He was granted a parcel of land that now includes the suburb of Leederville, which was named after him.

Leeder arrived in the Swan River Colony in 1830. He was the proprietor of Leeder's Hotel on the corner of St Georges Terrace and William Street (the site of what is now the Palace Hotel) from 1831 until his death in March 1845. He had eleven children including William George Leeder, who became the mayor of Newcastle.
