= Walcott Street =

Road in Perth, Western Australia

Walcott Street Western Australia

General information
- Type: Road
- Length: 3.9 km (2.4 mi)
- Opened: 1860s
- Route number(s): State Route 75

Major junctions
- Northwest end: Green Street (State Route 75), Joondanna
- Charles Street (State Route 60); Alexander Drive (north)/ Fitzgerald Street (south) (State Route 56); William Street; Beaufort Street (State Route 53)
- Southeast end: Guildford Road (north)/Lord Street (south) (State Route 51), Mount Lawley

Location(s)
- Major suburbs: Coolbinia, Menora, North Perth

Walcott Street is an east–west road in the inner northern suburbs of Perth, Western Australia, linking four of Perth's major northern road corridors (Charles Street, Alexander Drive, Beaufort Street and Guildford Road). It is a four-lane road for its entire length.

== Geography and route ==
Walcott Street begins in Mount Lawley and continues west through Menora and North Perth until ending at Charles Street. The path traverses a variety of suburbs, each with its distinct personality traits: from the alive, café-lined parts of Mount Lawley to the more sedate residential regions of Menora.

== History ==
Originally constructed in the early 20th century as part of the suburban network's expansion, Walcott Street has a long history as one of Perth's northern suburban roads. The change from a primarily residential street into an area with multiple uses throughout the years is symbolic of the outlying areas' expansion and urbanisation.

== Major intersections ==
All intersections listed are signalised unless otherwise mentioned.

| LGA | Location | km | mi | Destinations | Notes |
|---|---|---|---|---|---|
| Vincent–Stirling boundary | Joondanna–Coolbinia–North Perth–tripoint | 0.0 | 0.0 | Charles Street – Wanneroo, Osborne Park, Scarborough, Perth | Northwestern terminus. Continues west as Green Street (State Route 75) to Scarborough Beach Road. |
| Vincent–Stirling boundary | North Perth–Menora boundary | 1.6 | 0.99 | Alexander Drive northbound / Fitzgerald Street southbound (State Route 72) – Gnangara, Dianella, Northbridge, Perth | |
| Vincent–Stirling boundary | Mount Lawley | 2.5 | 1.6 | Longroyd Street - Edith Cowan University | No right turn permitted between Longroyd and Walcott Street northbound |
| Vincent–Stirling boundary | Mount Lawley | 2.7 | 1.7 | William Street – Northbridge, Perth | |
| Vincent–Stirling boundary | Mount Lawley | 3.3 | 2.1 | Beaufort Street (State Route 53) – Bedford, Inglewood, Highgate, Perth | No right turns permitted between both streets. |
| Vincent–Stirling boundary | Mount Lawley | 3.9 | 2.4 | Lord Street southwest / Guildford Road northeast (State Route 51) – Guildford, Maylands, Perth, East Perth | South eastern terminus at traffic light controlled t-junction |
1.000 mi = 1.609 km; 1.000 km = 0.621 mi: Incomplete access; Note: Intersections with minor local roads are not shown
