= Mount Lawley, Western Australia =

Mount Lawley
- Suburb
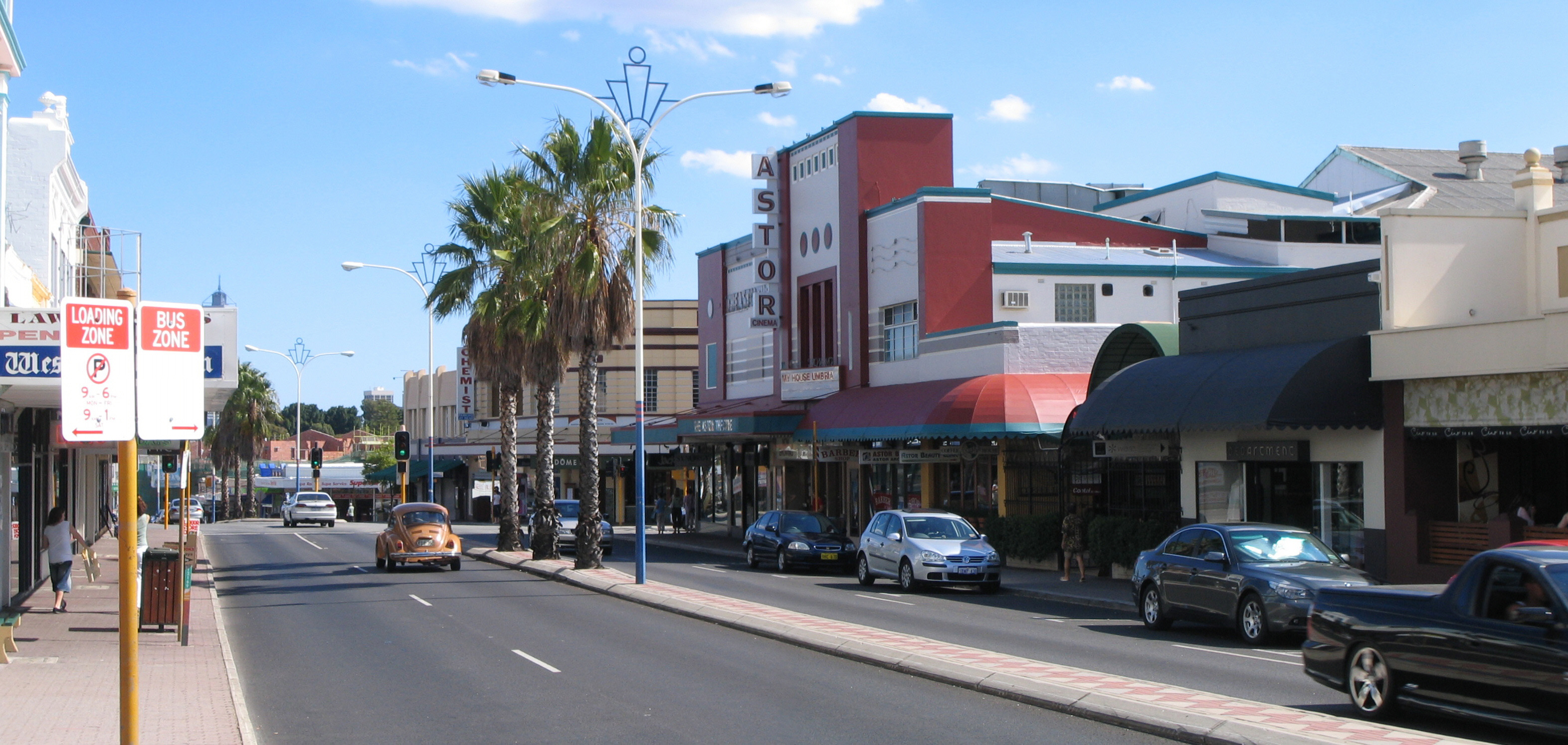
- Beaufort Street
- Interactive map of Mount Lawley
- Coordinates: 31°55′48″S 115°52′29″E
- Country: Australia
- State: Western Australia
- City: Perth
- LGAs: City of Stirling; City of Bayswater; City of Vincent
- Location: 4 km (2.5 mi) NE of Perth CBD
- Established: 1900s

Government
  - State electorate: Perth, Mount Lawley
  - Federal division: Perth

Area
  - Total: 4.0 km^{2} (1.5 sq mi)

Population
  - Total: 11,328 (SAL 2021)
- Postcode: 6050
Suburbs around Mount Lawley
Menora	Inglewood	Inglewood
North Perth	Mount Lawley	Maylands
Perth	Highgate	East Perth

Mount Lawley is an inner northern suburb of Perth, Western Australia. The suburb is bounded by the Swan River to the east, Vincent, Harold and Pakenham Streets to the south, Central Avenue and Alexander Drive to the north, and Norfolk Street to the west.

== History ==
Before the establishment of the Swan River Colony, the area was occupied by the Yabbaru Bibbulman Noongar people, who used the nearby Boodjamooling wetland (later known as Third Swamp Reserve, and now as Hyde Park) as a camping, fishing and meeting ground.

In 1865, Perth Suburban lots 140 to 149 were designated; these were bounded by Beaufort Street, Walcott Street, Lord Street and Lincoln Street. The colony was granted representative government in 1870, at which time Vincent Street and Walcott Street became boundaries of the City of Perth.

The Tramways Act 1885 allowed for construction of Perth's first tramway network, with trams in the area servicing Vincent Street, Beaufort Street and Walcott Street.

The area was part of the subdivision of Highgate Hill, with the area north of Vincent Street still consisting of large acreage, where much of the land was owned by William Leeder. Between 1889 and 1901, a number of estates were established in the area, beginning with the East Norwood Estate and including Mount Lawley Estate. Mount Lawley Estate was developed by R. T. Robinson and Sam Copley and stretched northwards from Walcott Street. The area of Mount Lawley was formally proclaimed in 1901. Mount Lawley was named in honour of Sir Arthur Lawley, the Governor of Western Australia from May 1901 to August 1902. His wife, Lady Annie Lawley, reputedly agreed to the naming of what was then primarily bushland in her husband's name on the condition that no licensed hotels be built in the suburb.

The Beaufort Street trams were replaced by trolley buses during the 1950s, and subsequently by diesel buses when the trolley bus service ended in 1968. A number of arterial streets carrying traffic in and out of the city centre began to carry heavy loads of traffic in the 1970s, and the suburb saw a significant commercial and residential revival from this period on.

== Governance ==
Mount Lawley comes under the jurisdiction of the City of Vincent, the City of Stirling and City of Bayswater local government areas.

At the state government level, the suburb is in the electoral districts of Mount Lawley and Perth, and it is in the Division of Perth at the federal government level.

== Geography ==
Mount Lawley is in the Perth Basin on the Swan Coastal Plain. Much of the modern suburb is located within the former Perth Wetlands area, with significant drainage work being conducted in the area between 1832 and the 1880s.

== Sites of interest ==
=== Astor Theatre ===
The Astor Theatre was constructed in 1914–15 and was originally named the Lyceum Theatre, and subsequently the State Theatre. It was redesigned in an Art Deco style in 1939 and received its current name in 1941. It was listed on the State Register of Heritage Places in 1999.

=== Western Australian Academy of Performing Arts ===
The Western Australian Academy of Performing Arts (WAAPA) was established in 1980 and teaches acting, musical theatre, directing, dance, jazz and contemporary music, classical music, arts management, production, design, and broadcasting. WAAPA's alumni include Heath Ledger, Hugh Jackman and Tim Minchin.

== Transport ==
=== Public transport ===
Mount Lawley is well positioned to take advantage of public transit in Perth. The Mount Lawley train station is in the east of the suburb, and provides access to the Midland railway line. There are also a number of bus routes which service the area. Buses benefit from dedicated bus lanes along Beaufort Street, which are operational during weekday peak traffic periods, and the 950 connects Mount Lawley with the University of Western Australia in Crawley.

==== Bus ====
- 20 Edith Cowan University Mount Lawley to Galleria Bus Station – serves Bradford Street
- 406 Edith Cowan University Mount Lawley to Glendalough Station – serves Bradford Street
- 980 Elizabeth Quay Bus Station to Galleria Bus Station (high frequency) – serves William Street, Walcott Street, Longroyd Street and North Street

Bus routes serving Alexander Drive:

- 360 and 361 Perth Busport to Alexander Heights Shopping Centre (limited stops)
- 362 Perth Busport to Ballajura (limited stops)
- 960 Curtin University Bus Station to Mirrabooka Bus Station (high frequency)

Bus routes serving Beaufort Street:

- 66 Elizabeth Quay Bus Station to Galleria Bus Station (limited stops)
- 67 and 68 Perth Busport to Mirrabooka Bus Station
- 950 Queen Elizabeth II Medical Centre to Galleria Bus Station (high frequency)

Bus routes serving Lord Street and Guildford Road:

- 40 Elizabeth Quay Bus Station to Galleria Bus Station
- 41 Elizabeth Quay Bus Station to Bayswater Station
- 42 and 43 Elizabeth Quay Bus Station to Maylands Boat Ramp

==== Rail ====
- Midland Line
  - Mount Lawley Station

=== Road infrastructure ===
The majority of the Mount Lawley road network is laid out in the regular grid pattern, which was the popular method at the time of subdivision.

The main collector road in Mount Lawley is Beaufort Street, which runs north–south linking Morley in the north to the Perth city centre in the south. Walcott Street is another collector road, running southeast–northwest through Mount Lawley, leading towards a main arterial, Wanneroo Road. Guildford Road / Lord Street is an arterial road running parallel to Beaufort Street linking to Graham Farmer Freeway, Tonkin Highway and Great Eastern Highway. Vincent Street connects Mount Lawley to the west, including North Perth and Leederville.

== Places of worship ==
- Friends’ Meeting House, Mt Lawley Recognised Meeting (Quakers Australia)
- Maylands-Mt Lawley Uniting Church
- Our Lady of the Annunciation Melkite Catholic Parish
- St Patrick's Anglican Church
- Temple David, a Progressive Jewish congregation and synagogue

== Education ==
Mount Lawley hosts a campus of Edith Cowan University and which includes WAAPA. Adjacent to the campus is Mount Lawley Senior High School (MLSHS), a state school that opened in 1955 and which was extensively renovated with $40 million of Government funding in 2005–06.

In addition to MLSHS, the suburb hosts the Anglican girls' school Perth College, a private K–12 campus for both day and boarding students, and two primary schools, being Mount Lawley Primary School and St Paul's Primary School.
