= North Perth, Western Australia =

North Perth Perth, Western Australia
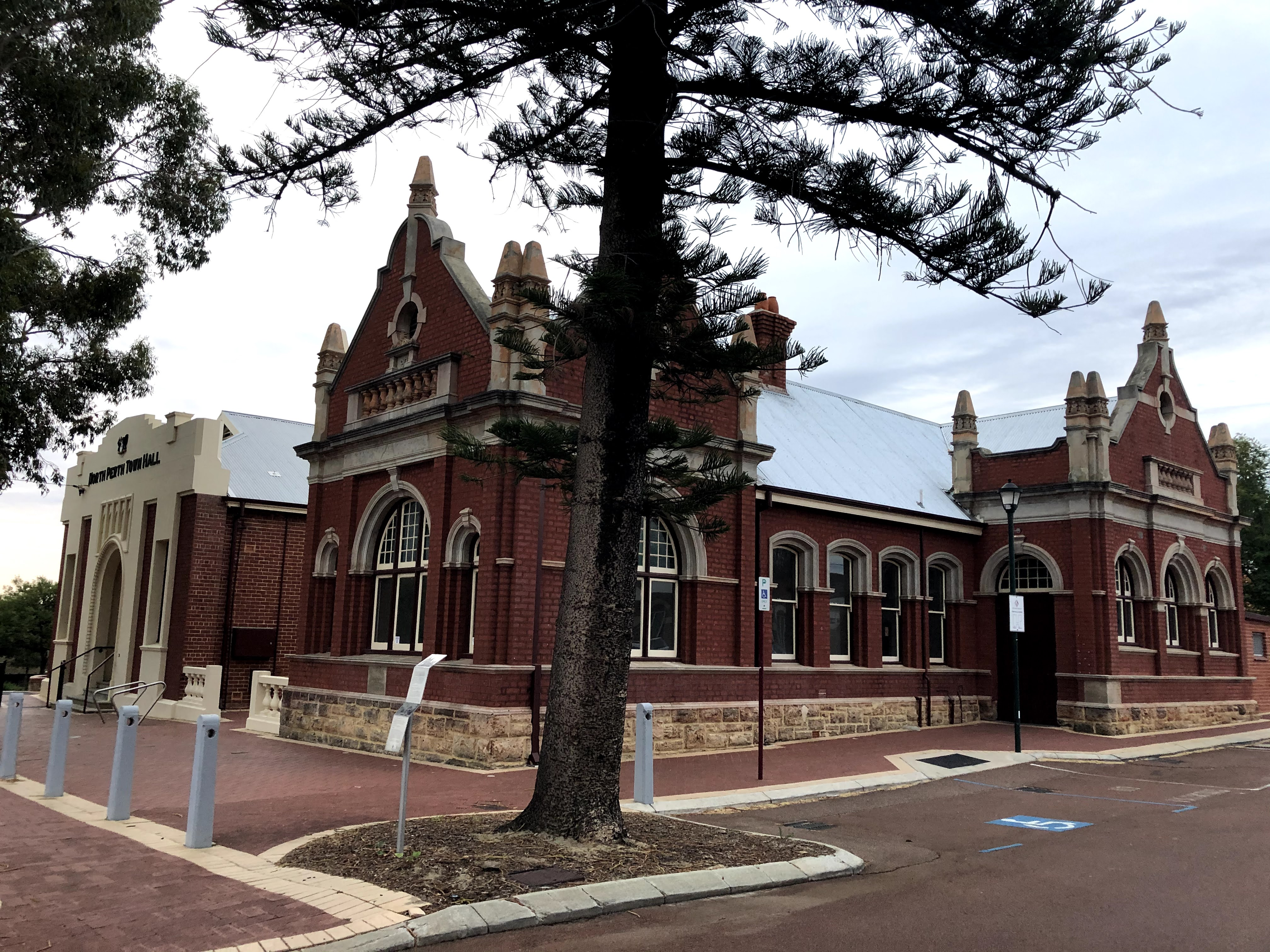
- The heritage listed North Perth Town Hall
- Coordinates: 31.928°S 115.853°E
- Population: 9,623 (SAL 2021)
- Postcode(s): 6006
- Area: 3.1 km^{2} (1.2 sq mi)
- Location: 4 km (2 mi) N of the Perth CBD
- LGA(s): City of Vincent
- State electorate(s): Perth
- Federal division(s): Perth
Suburbs around North Perth:
Joondanna and Mount Hawthorn	Coolbinia and Menora	Mount Lawley
Leederville	North Perth	Mount Lawley
West Perth	Perth	Highgate

North Perth is a suburb of Perth, Western Australia, located within the City of Vincent.

This old, established suburb three kilometres north of the Perth central business district is a place of mainly solid brick homes built from the early 1900s, many of which are now undergoing extensive renovations in line with the nationwide trend toward close-to-the-city living. It is home to various small shops and cafes, as well as the Rosemount Hotel. Beatty Park Leisure Centre was built (as Beatty Park Aquatic Centre) for the Perth Commonwealth Games in 1962 in Vincent Street.

North Perth is home to North Perth Primary School and Kyilla Primary School. North Perth Primary School was established in 1899 and by 1921 was the largest primary school in the state.

According to the 2016 Census data, North Perth has a median age of 37 years, with 14.0% over the age of 65. The residents have a median personal income per week of $943, median household income of $2,074 and median family income of $2,616. This is a higher median income in all categories than Australia as a whole ($724, $1,910 and $1,595 respectively).

== Transport ==
=== Bus ===
- 402 Perth Busport to Stirling Station – serves Loftus Street
- 403 Perth Busport to Stirling Station – serves Loftus Street and London Street
- 404 Perth Busport to Osborne Park – serves Loftus Street and London Street
- 406 Edith Cowan University Mount Lawley to Glendalough Station – serves Walcott Street and Green Street
- 990 Perth Busport to Scarborough Beach Bus Station (high frequency) – serves Charles Street and Scarborough Beach Road

Bus routes serving Charles Street:

- 370 Perth Busport to Mirrabooka Bus Station (limited stops)
- 384 Perth Busport to Mirrabooka Bus Station
- 385 Perth Busport to Kingsway City (limited stops)
- 386 Perth Busport to Kingsway City
- 387 and 388 Perth Busport to Warwick Station
- 389 Perth Busport to Wanneroo
- 970 Perth Busport to Mirrabooka Bus Station (high frequency)

Bus routes serving Fitzgerald Street:

- 19 Perth Busport to Flinders Square
- 360 and 361 Perth Busport to Alexander Heights Shopping Centre (limited stops)
- 362 Perth Busport to Ballajura (limited stops)
- 960 Curtin University Bus Station to Mirrabooka Bus Station (high frequency)

== See also ==
- Electoral district of North Perth
- Municipality of North Perth
