= Coolbinia, Western Australia =

Coolbinia Perth, Western Australia
- Coordinates: 31.913°S 115.854°E
- Population: 1,751 (SAL 2021)
- Postcode(s): 6050
- Location: 6 km (4 mi) N of Perth CBD
- LGA(s): City of Stirling
- State electorate(s): Mount Lawley
- Federal division(s): Perth
Suburbs around Coolbinia:
Yokine	Yokine	Yokine
Joondanna	Coolbinia	Menora
North Perth	North Perth	Menora

Coolbinia is a suburb of Perth, Western Australia. Its local government area is the City of Stirling.

The name Coolbinia is an Aboriginal word for mistletoe and the suburb was named when split from Mount Lawley in 1953.

== Transport ==
=== Bus ===
- 19 Perth Busport to Flinders Square – serves Holmfirth Street, Carnarvon Crescent, Beverley Street and Meenaar Crescent
- 370 Perth Busport to Mirrabooka Bus Station (limited stops) – serves Wiluna Street
- 406 Edith Cowan University Mount Lawley to Glendalough Station – serves Walcott Street
- 970 Perth Busport to Mirrabooka Bus Station (high frequency) – serves Wiluna Street
