= City of Vincent =

Coordinates: 31°56′10″S 115°50′02″E

- Local government area
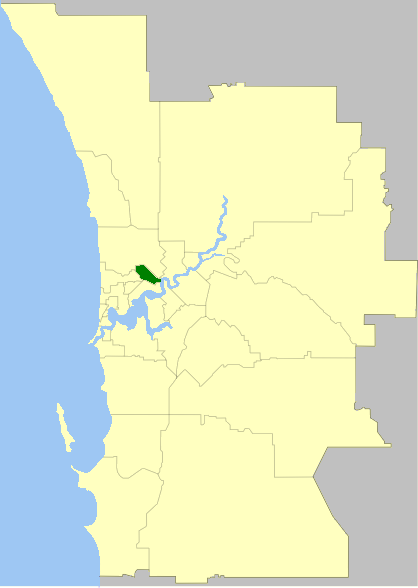
- The City of Vincent within the Perth Metropolitan Area

- Interactive map of City of Vincent
- Country: Australia
- State: Western Australia
- Region: North Metropolitan Perth
- Established: 1994
- Council seat: Leederville

Government
  - Mayor: Alison Xamon
  - State electorate: Perth, Mount Lawley
  - Federal division: Perth, Curtin

Area
  - Total: 10.4 km^{2} (4.0 sq mi)

Population
  - Total: 36,537 (LGA 2021)
  - Density: 3,055/km^{2} (7,910/sq mi)
- Website: City of Vincent
LGAs around City of Vincent
Stirling	Stirling	Bayswater
Cambridge	City of Vincent	Bayswater
Subiaco	Perth	Victoria Park

The City of Vincent is a local government area of Western Australia. It covers an area of approximately 10.4 square kilometres (4.0 sq mi) in metropolitan Perth, the capital of Western Australia, and lies about 3 km from the Perth CBD. The City of Vincent maintains 139 km of roads and 104 ha of parks and gardens. It had a population of over 33,000 at the 2016 census.

== History ==
The City of Vincent is named after the street of that name that runs through it, which itself was believed to have been named by the chief draftsman in the Lands Department, George Vincent, after himself in about 1876. George Vincent was the recipient of the land on the north side of the street, east of Charles Street, in the first Crown grant of Perth.

In May 1895, the developing area that included Leederville and West Leederville was gazetted the Leederville Roads Board.

In 1895, the Leederville Roads Board became a municipality, and in April 1897 was divided into north, south and central wards. By this point the municipal population had reached more than one thousand people.

In 1914, the greater Perth movement led to the amalgamation of the municipalities of North Perth, Leederville and Perth (subsequently joined in 1917 by Victoria Park).

On 1 July 1994, the restructuring of the City of Perth by the Government of Western Australia created three new local governments: the Town of Vincent, the Town of Cambridge and the Town of Shepperton (now the Town of Victoria Park), plus a smaller City of Perth. It became the City of Vincent when it gained city status on 1 July 2011.

In 2014, a municipal reform proposal to abolish the city and split its territory between the City of Perth and the City of Stirling was countered with a proposal to amalgamate Vincent with Perth. Ultimately these negotiations failed and the reform process was abandoned, with no change to the boundaries of the City of Vincent.

== Suburbs ==
The suburbs of the City of Vincent with population and size figures based on the most recent Australian census:

Suburb	Population	Area	Map
Coolbinia *	1,751 (SAL 2021)	0.9 km^{2} (0.35 sq mi)	
East Perth **	11,681 (SAL 2021)	3.2 km^{2} (1.2 sq mi)	
Highgate	2,326 (SAL 2021)	0.4 km^{2} (0.15 sq mi)	
Leederville	3,686 (SAL 2021)	1.5 km^{2} (0.58 sq mi)	
Mount Hawthorn	8,183 (SAL 2021)	2.4 km^{2} (0.93 sq mi)	
Mount Lawley ***	11,328 (SAL 2021)	4.4 km^{2} (1.7 sq mi)	
North Perth	9,623 (SAL 2021)	3.1 km^{2} (1.2 sq mi)	
Osborne Park *	4,463 (SAL 2021)	5.1 km^{2} (2.0 sq mi)	
Perth **	13,670 (SAL 2021)	4.6 km^{2} (1.8 sq mi)	
West Perth **	6,102 (SAL 2021)	2.2 km^{2} (0.85 sq mi)	

- ( * indicates shared with City of Stirling)
- ( ** indicates shared with City of Perth)
- ( *** indicates shared with City of Stirling and City of Bayswater)

== Population ==
Historical population
Year	Pop.	±% p.a.
1991	24,765	—
1996	24,422	−0.28%
2001	24,761	+0.28%
2006	26,878	+1.65%
2011	31,549	+3.26%
2016	33,693	+1.32%
2021	36,537	+1.63%

== Sister cities ==
The City of Vincent has signed a friendship charter with the city of Prilep, in North Macedonia.

== Heritage listed places ==
As of 2024, 425 places are heritage-listed in the City of Vincent, of which 63 are on the State Register of Heritage Places, among them Perth Oval, East Perth Power Station and the Redemptorist Monastery.

== See also ==
- AmpFest, Youth and music festival overseen by the City of Vincent
- List of mayors of Vincent
