= West Perth, Western Australia =

West Perth
- Suburb
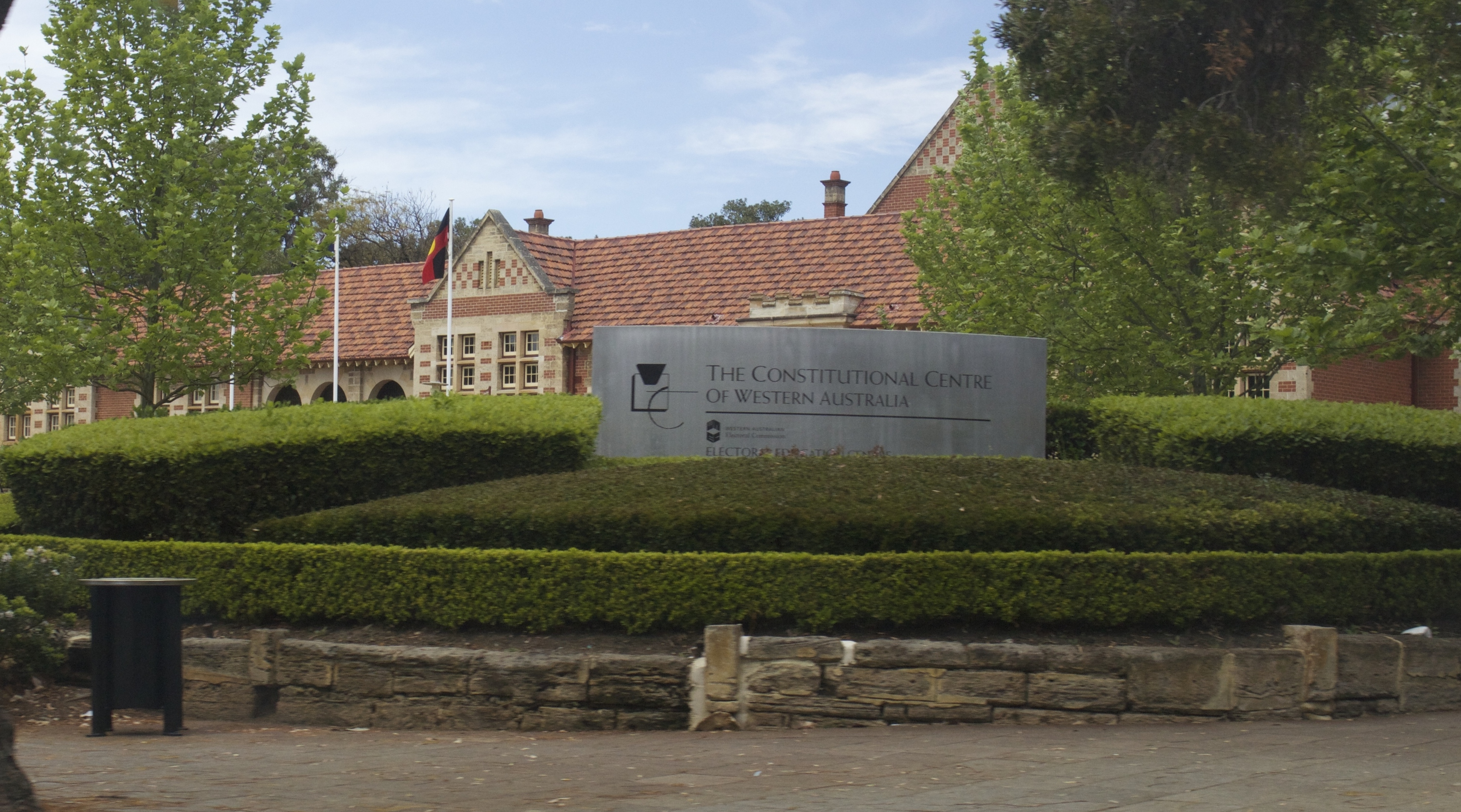
- The Constitutional Centre of Western Australia, located in West Perth
- Interactive map of West Perth
- Coordinates: 31°56′43″S 115°50′44″E
- Country: Australia
- State: Western Australia
- City: Perth
- LGAs: City of Perth; City of Vincent
- Location: 1.3 km (0.81 mi) W of Perth

Government
  - State electorates: Perth; Nedlands
  - Federal division: Perth

Area
  - Total: 2.2 km^{2} (0.85 sq mi)
- Elevation: 51 m (167 ft)

Population
  - Total: 6,102 (SAL 2021)
- Postcode: 6005
Suburbs around West Perth
West Leederville	Leederville	Northbridge
Subiaco	West Perth	Perth
Subiaco	Kings Park	Perth

West Perth is an inner suburb of Perth, the capital city of Western Australia.

== Geography ==
Formerly an exclusive enclave for wealthy merchants and politicians, the West Perth suburb is now part of the inner mixed zone, and has predominantly office blocks which have displaced residential buildings.

The suburb has a relatively high proportion of miners, consultants, and especially medical specialists as compared with the Perth CBD. Streets such as Colin Street, Ord Street, and Outram Street have a significant percentage of office and high density residential buildings.

Most retail outlets are located on Hay Street, which is the main commercial zone for the suburb, and these are focused on serving the office population.

Closer to the CBD, the eastern edge of the suburb features both the Watertown brand outlet complex and the City West complex. This location was home to the Perth Metropolitan Markets from 1929 to 1989, when they moved to Canning Vale.

== Livability ==
In 2018, West Perth was named as the best place to live in the world by international analytics company SAS.

== Notable buildings ==
Parliament House is located overlooking St Georges Terrace and Mitchell Freeway, and is at the centre of the Parliament precinct. Also in the precinct is Dumas House, the original Perth Observatory, the second location of Hale School, Solidarity Park, Edith Dircksey Cowan Memorial, and the Constitutional Centre of Western Australia.

== See also ==
- Greater Perth
- List of Perth suburbs
- Perth metropolitan region
