= Leederville, Western Australia =

Leederville
- Suburb
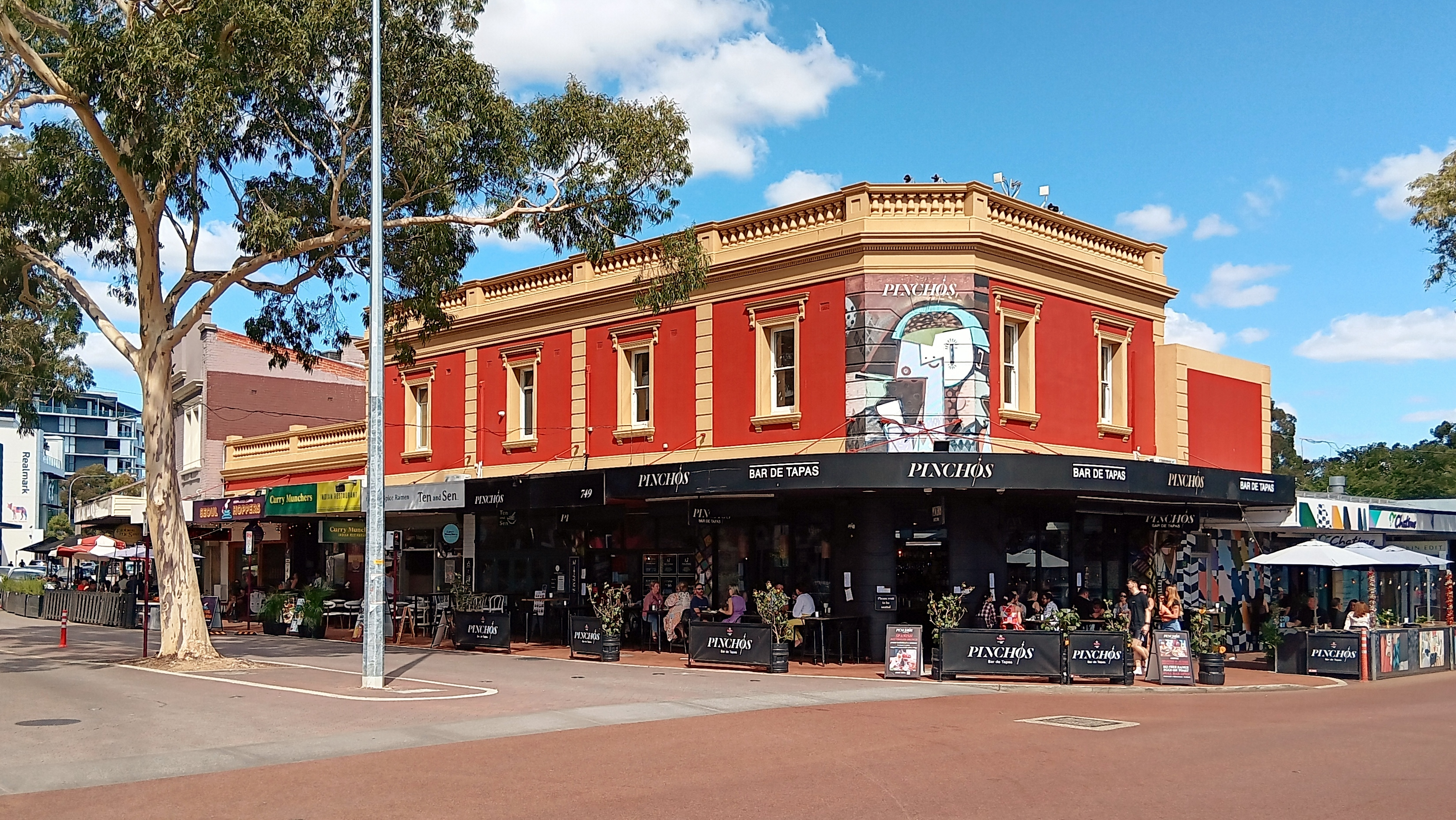
- Oxford Street, Leederville
- Interactive map of Leederville
- Coordinates: 31.936°S 115.834°E
- Country: Australia
- State: Western Australia
- City: Perth
- LGA: City of Vincent
- Location: 4 km (2.5 mi) NW of Perth CBD

Government
  - State electorate: Perth
  - Federal division: Perth

Population
  - Total: 3,686 (SAL 2021)
- Postcode: 6007
Suburbs around Leederville
Wembley	Mount Hawthorn	North Perth
Wembley	Leederville	North Perth
West Leederville	West Leederville	West Perth

Leederville is a suburb within the City of Vincent in the Perth metropolitan region of Western Australia. It is located approximately 3 kilometres (1.9 mi) north-west of the Perth central business district. It is bounded by Mitchell Freeway to the west and Loftus Street to the east.

It is home to Aranmore Catholic College, the School of Isolated and Distance Education, North Metropolitan TAFE, Trinity Theological College, and St Mary's Church. The suburb was named after William Henry Leeder, the original grantee of land that encompassed the area.

== History ==
After the creation of the Swan River Colony, Leederville and surrounding districts were used for agriculture by European settlers drawn by its access to fresh water and closeness to the Perth central business district. Lake Georgianna, part of the Perth wetlands to the south of present-day Leederville Oval, was drained by convict labour.

The name Leederville came into use in the late 19th century. It was named after the Leeder Estate which represented the remaining landholdings of William Henry Leeder, who was granted land in the area in 1830. The growth of the area was facilitated by the opening of the Perth–Fremantle railway line in 1881. The Leeder Estate was subdivided into residential lots in 1891, with other subdivisions including Lake View Estate and Leederville Station Estate.

In 1895, a separate Leederville Road District was created which was replaced by the Municipality of Leederville in 1896. Many public buildings were erected during this time including Leederville Primary School (1894), Leederville Post Office (1897), the Leederville Hotel (1897) and Leederville Police Station (1898). The original Leederville railway station opened in 1897 (renamed West Leederville in 1913) and the Perth tramway network expanded to Leederville in 1900. The Leederville Municipality was dissolved in 1914 and merged into the City of Perth, in line with the Greater Perth Movement.

In 1973, the completion of the Mitchell Freeway divided Leederville in half. A separate suburb named West Leederville was gazetted in 1998, although that name had long been used locally.

== Notable locations ==
=== Sporting facilities ===
- Leederville Oval
- Litis Stadium

=== Heritage-listed places ===
As of 2026 six places in Leederville are listed on the State Register of Heritage Places:

Place name	Place #	Street number	Street name	Co-ordinates	Notes and former names	Photo
Aranmore Catholic College Group	8709		30–42 Franklin Street and 338–342 Shakespeare Street	31.927694°S 115.843000°E	Arranmore, St Mary's Convent and School, St Mary's College, Christian Brothers College	
Drill Hall, Leederville	8764	177	Oxford Street	31.936144°S 115.840135°E	RAAF Barracks and Drill Hall, Leederville Mechanics' Institute	
Leederville Post Office	2203	156	Oxford Street	31.936242°S 115.841455°E		
Oddfellows Hall (former), Leederville	8736	217	Oxford Street	31.933628°S 115.840938°E	Oddfellows Hall, IOOF Buffaloes Lodge (former)	
St Mary's Catholic Church	2196	40	Franklin Street	31.927039°S 115.843169°E		
St Mary's Hall	2202	336	Oxford Street	31.927650°S 115.841569°E		

== Notable residents ==
- Syd Negus
- Shane Paltridge

== See also ==
- Electoral district of Leederville
