= Conti roll =

Popular sandwich in Perth, Western Australia

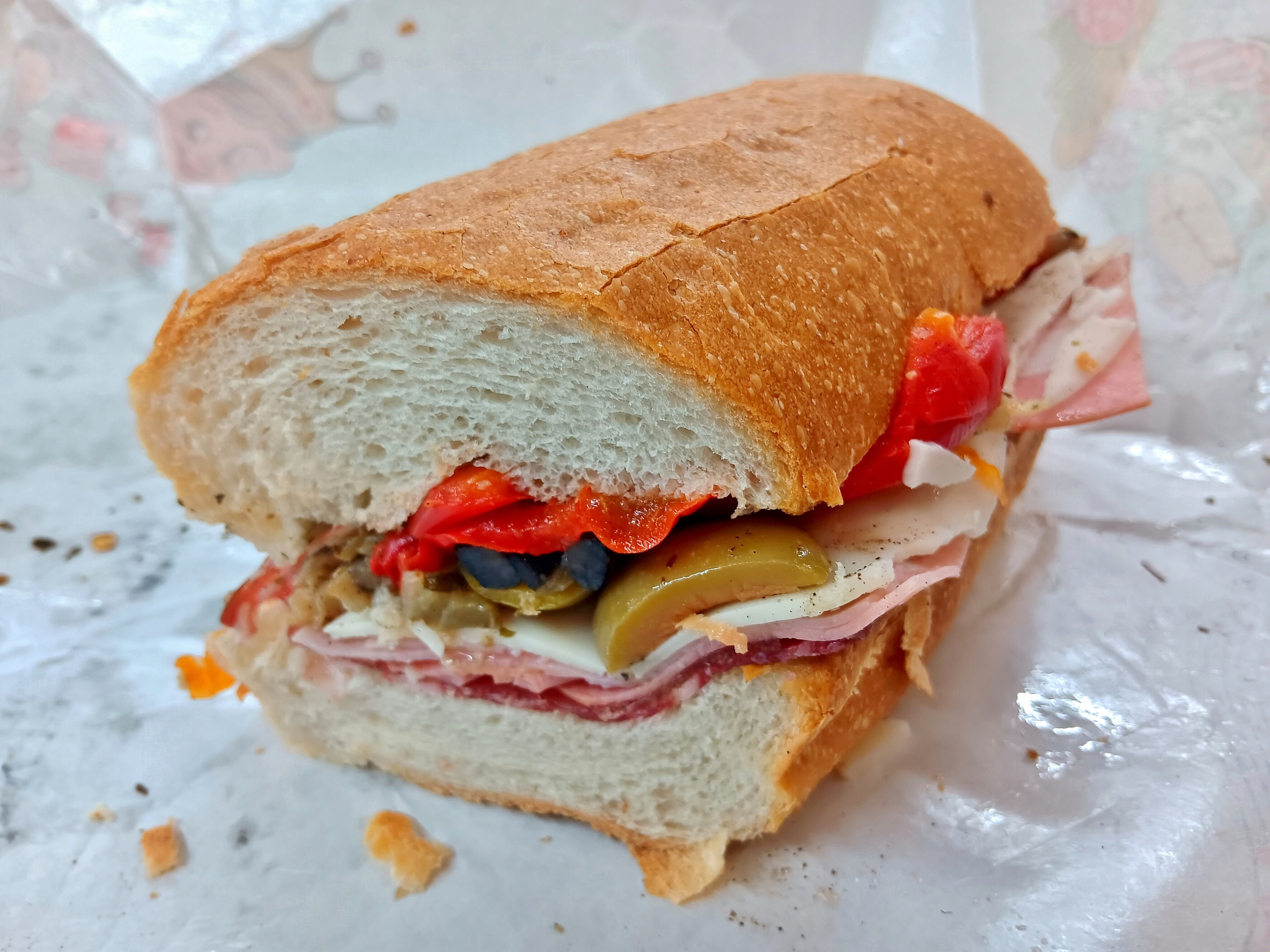
- A traditional conti roll prepared by The Re Store, Northbridge, in 2025
- Alternative names: Continental roll (English); Panino Italiano (Italian)
- Type: Sandwich
- Course: Main course
- Place of origin: Perth
- Region or state: Western Australia
- Associated cuisine: Italian cuisine
- Serving temperature: Cold
- Main ingredients: Bread roll; mixed meats; cheese; preserved vegetables
- Similar dishes: Muffuletta; Submarine sandwich

The conti roll, or continental roll, is a sandwich popular in Perth, Western Australia. It was originally referred to by local native speakers of Italian as a panino Italiano. Its Anglophone name alludes to continental Europe (as opposed to the British Isles), the source of the majority of its ingredients.

== Description ==
The conti roll has been described as being " ... a singularly Western Australian creation ...", as "... the closest thing ... West Australians have to a regional sandwich," and as part of "... Italy’s contribution to Western Australia’s food culture." It has also been said to be "... a niche item, specific to Perth", although similar creations are available from select outlets elsewhere in Australia.

The time-honoured West Australian sandwich consists of a long bread roll filled with Italian deli meats, cheese, and preserved, antipasti-style vegetables. Another description, courtesy of The Bell Tower Times, is "... a generous bread roll, a variety of deli meats & cheeses and then whatever else you want from the showcase of Mediterranean delights".

Conti rolls can be eaten at any hour. However, the places that sell them are usually open for business from breakfast until late afternoon, and they are popular as lunches, especially for office workers.

Traditionally, the bread roll of a conti roll is crusty and also chewy – preferably a "jaw-tester" facilitating "a mastication marathon" that might even leave "the gums sore after eating". But even in the early days of the sandwich, some customers complained of "lockjaw", and softer bread rolls were created as an alternative. In the 21st century, "... any sort of baguette works ...", and most of the conti rolls sold by Perth's newer outlets tend to be made with soft baguettes.

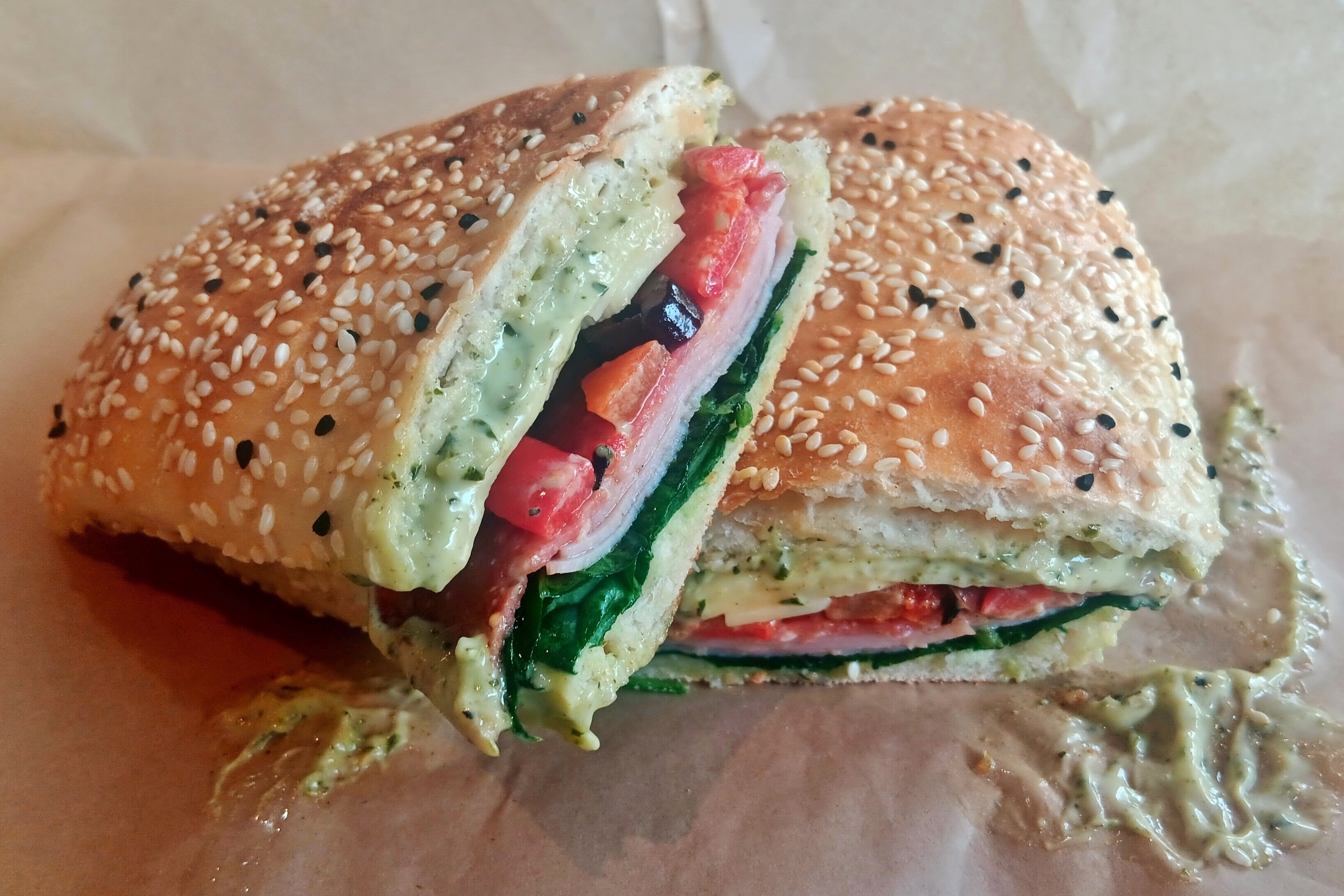
A non-traditional variation of conti roll with soft, seeded, bread, served toasted in 2026

A good conti roll is said to contain at least three different meats, in combination with the other ingredients. This approach to a sandwich is not traditional to Italian cuisine, which often avoids the mixing of too many flavours. A conti roll, by contrast, attempts to 'have the whole shop in the roll'.

Customarily, the meats in a conti roll are coppa, mortadella, and salami. Other meats that might find their way into the sandwich include ham, prosciutto, sopressa, and even jamón ibérico; fussy eaters can specify their desired meat mix. The cheese used might be mozzarella, pecorino, provolone, or Swiss-type.

In a classic conti roll, the ingredients other than the bread, meats, and cheese will be vegetables that have been preserved antipasti- or Mediterranean-style. Typically, they are eggplant, olives, and artichoke, but might include others such as pickled capsicum or sun-dried tomatoes. Some contemporary variations of the sandwich either include or substitute fresh salad vegetables, such as cucumber, lettuce, red onion, or tomato, or other vegetables or concoctions such as aïoli, pickled chillies, dill pickles, roasted paprika, piccalilli, or rocket.

The ingredients in a 21st century conti roll might even include "typical Australian" toppings, such as julienned carrot or beetroot; in 2016, SBS Food suggested that a conti roll with such inclusions would be "Australian-Italian fusion".

== History ==
The conti roll may have been born, and certainly was raised, in the Perth locality now known as Northbridge, which has been described by SBS Food as "... the inner-city neighbourhood just north of the CBD and one of the Italian community’s traditional heartlands." Otherwise, the sandwich's origins are unclear. Most famously, conti rolls are associated with two delis, The Re Store, which started selling its wares in 1936, and Di Chiera Brothers Continental Store, a business that dates from the mid-1950s. It seems the conti roll may have come into being after the latter deli opened.

Each of the two delis was founded by members of an immigrant family from Italy. Western Australia has had several waves of Italian immigration. In the 1880s and 1890s, there were various gold rushes that attracted prospectors from all over the world, including Italy. Another wave was sparked in 1921, by the imposition by the USA of quotas on immigration; between that year and 1933, the Italian-born population of Australia as a whole trebled. After the end of World War II, there was a further wave of Italian immigration to Australia.

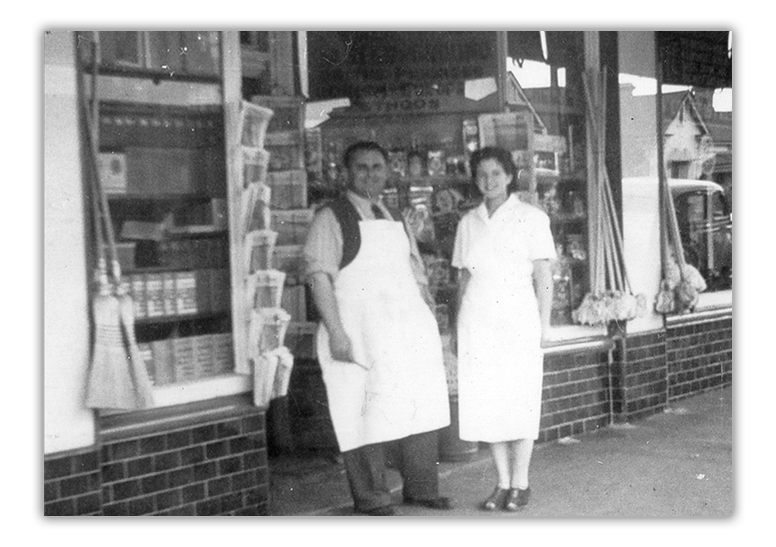
John and Maria Re outside the original The Re Store, c. 1939

The family now renowned for establishing and operating The Re Store traces its origins to Salina, one of the Aeolian Islands north of Sicily, Southern Italy. In 1885, Giuseppe Re migrated from Salina to Sydney, where he ran a food store with some Italian friends. Nearly a decade later, he joined the first wave of Italian emigrants to Western Australia, when he travelled to Fremantle to try his luck on the Kalgoorlie gold fields. In 1904, he opened a deli in Fremantle. Soon afterwards, the deli was joined by a second shop, in James Street, Northbridge, named Giuseppe. Re and Sons.

In 1908, Giovanni (John) Re was born, as the second son of Giuseppe Re and his wife Carolina, who ultimately had 10 sons. John Re and his siblings later worked in the family business. In 1931, during the second wave of Italian immigration, John Re and his own wife, Maria, opened a small fruit and vegetable shop opposite St Brigid's church, Northbridge, and in 1936 founded a grocery store, The Re Store, at the corner of Lake and Aberdeen streets, Northbridge.

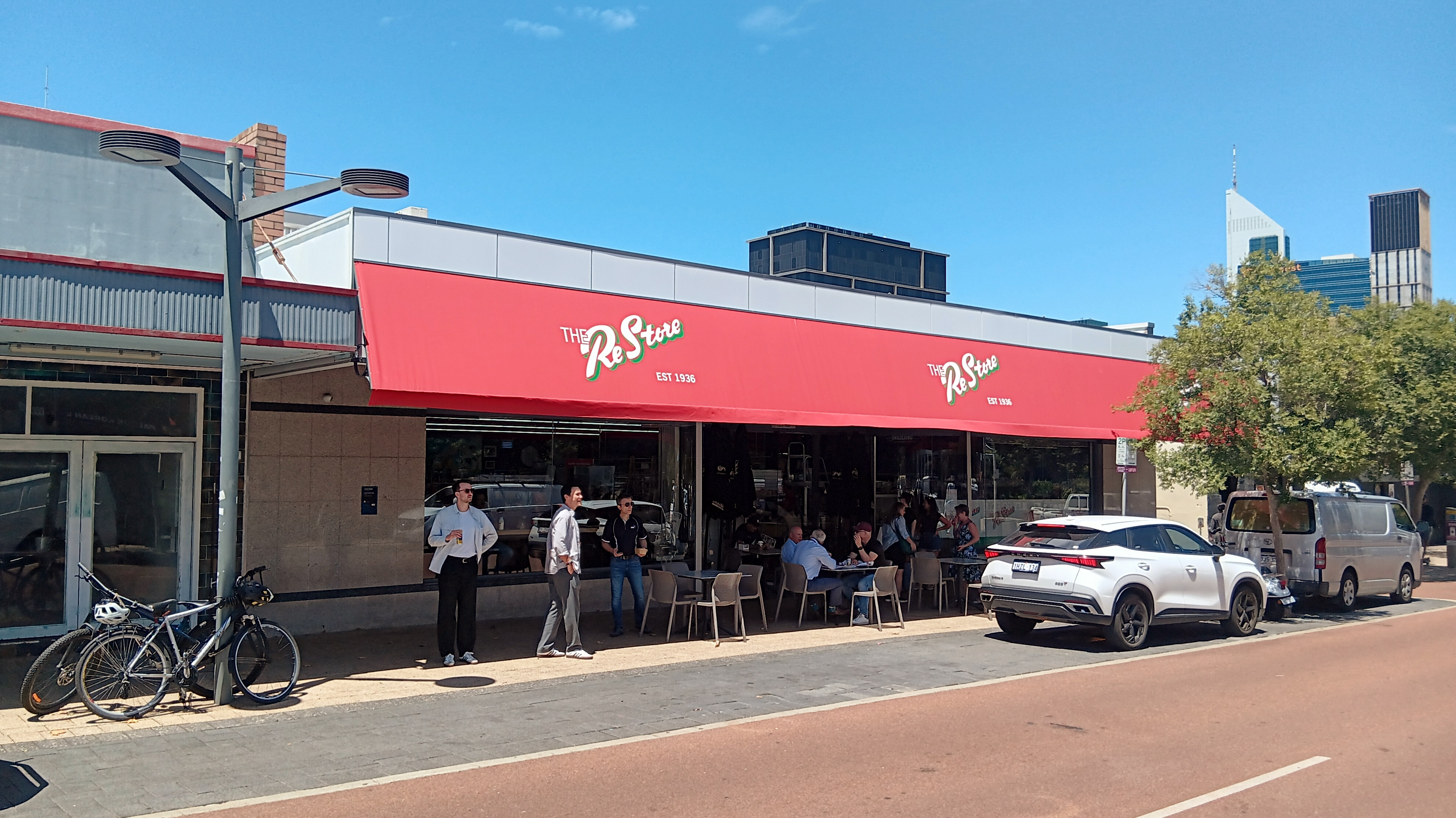
The Re Store, Northbridge, in 2026

According to SBS Food, Aurora Berti, daughter of John Re, is the source of "one of the more credible creation myths" concerning the invention of the conti roll:

"... during the ’50s, Italian labourers and market gardeners would spend Saturday mornings shopping at the Re Store on the corner of Lake and Aberdeen streets in Northbridge ([as of 2016], the long-standing Italian restaurant Romany sits at the site with the Re Store across the road; a second Re Store is on Oxford Street in Leederville). In between gossiping and drinking coffee, the men would buy cornettos – a small, braided Italian roll – and fill them with the meat and cheese they had just purchased, laying the foundation for a local legend."

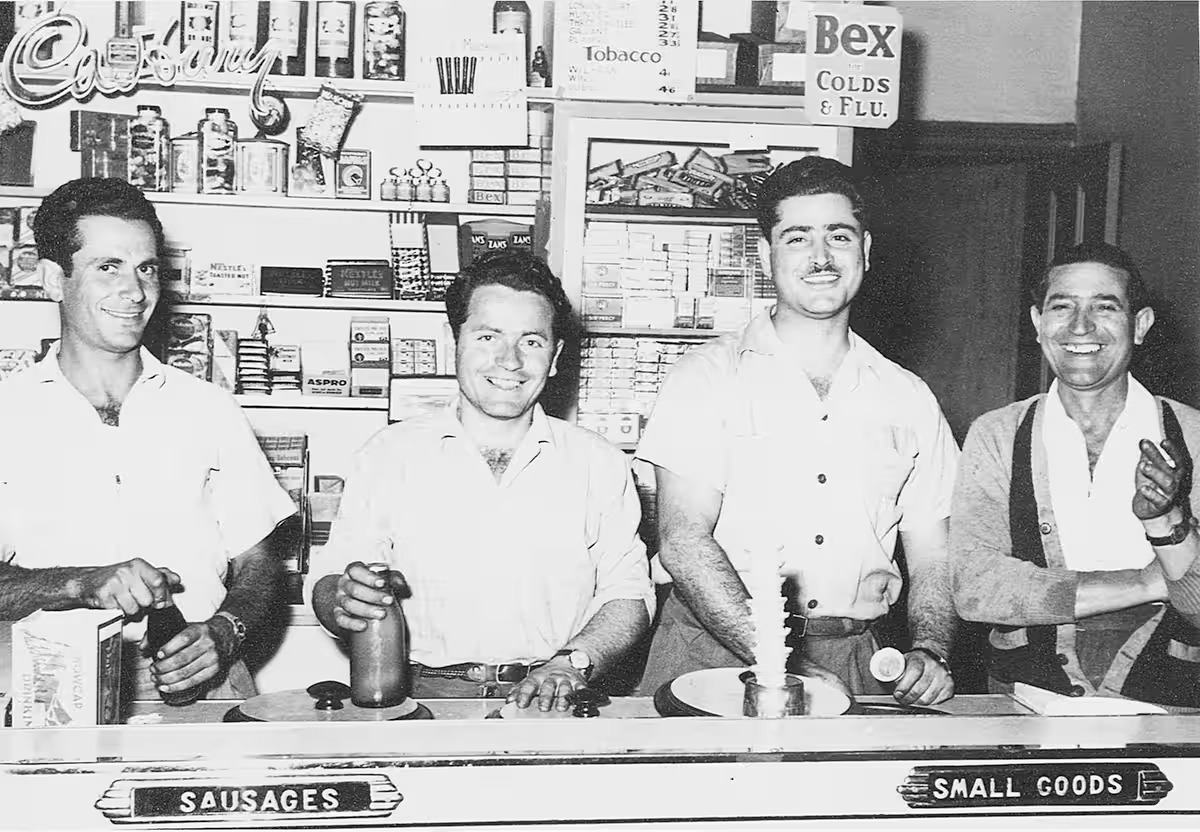
Owners and staff at the original Di Chiera Brothers store, c. 1953

The main alternative creation myth involves the brothers Di Chiera. They emigrated from Naples, also in Southern Italy, as part of the third wave of Italian immigration. Antonio Di Chiera, then a young man, arrived in Perth in 1949, and a few months later he was joined by his brother Giuseppe. In 1953, after raising money by digging potatoes around Harvey and later excavating roadside drains, the brothers took out a lease on their first grocery store, Di Chiera Brothers in William Street, Northbridge. In 1957, they relocated to Fitzgerald Street, North Perth, where Antonio, his wife Eleonora and their children lived above the store.

According to the Di Chiera Brothers' version of events, the conti roll was originally a post-market snack for the brothers, and a way of using left-over or unsellable ends of salami and other processed meats. It later became a hit with customers. "Dad started making the continental roll because there was a demand for it," Antonio's son, Tom Di Chiera, told SBS Food in 2016, "It’s not like they came up with the idea." Italian migrant workers needed lunches to take to work, and Eleonora had the task of making the lunches. "The shop would be open from 5:00am and she would prepare a whole lot of these continental rolls," he told ABC Radio Perth in 2021.

Initially, the native Italian-speaking creators and purchasers of early conti rolls would refer to them as panini (transl. sandwiches), or panini Italiano. Over time, as Anglo-Australian customers began to buy them, they came to be called 'continental rolls'.

Tom Di Chiera's explanation to ABC Radio Perth as to the introduction of the English name was that once the migrant Italian workers who bought the sandwiches from Di Chiera Brothers became established, "... of course, they got married, and their wives would make their lunch. So mum was left with a product that she no longer had a captive audience for." Her solution was to give it an English name: "It was simply the continental roll because the ingredients were from the continent rather than the British Isles," he said. As diminutives and hypocorisms are common in Australian English, the product also acquired the nickname 'conti roll'; The Bell Tower Times' take on the nickname is:

"'Conti roll' is short for 'continental roll' but using the full word is a great way to demonstrate that you’re not from around here. In fact, failing to shorten the word is so grating on Western Australian ears it is more or less considered an act of treason here."

Since its initial creation, the sandwich has grown in popularity to become available at many other cafes and delicatessens. Outlets that have come to serve conti rolls include Passione Gourmet Deli, Charlies Fresh Cafe, and Lo Presti & Son.

In recent years, contemporary variations on the conti roll have emerged. One Perth outlet, Deli's Continental, uses an undercoat of capsicum conserva topped with mortadella, salami, casalinga, and percorino-style cheese.

In July 2020, Angelo Street Market and North Street Store combined to introduce Perth's longest ever conti roll, 10 times the size of a normal one: 'The Contimental', made up of a 1.2 m-long (3.9 ft) sesame seeded sourdough roll, 200 g (7.1 oz) each of smoked ham, sopressa, pepper mortadella and Swiss cheese, together with lettuce, tomato, red peppers, marinated eggplant, Spanish olives, sun dried tomato and mayonnaise.

Meanwhile, The Re Store and Di Chiera Brothers both received favourable international publicity in connection with their conti rolls. In 2016, when American chef-turned-rapper Action Bronson visited Western Australia to record an episode of his cult show F*ck, That's Delicious, he praised Di Chiera Brothers' conti roll as a "meat sanctuary". Two years later, in 2018, The New York Times, in an enthusiastic review of The Re Store's Northbridge offerings, including its conti rolls, described as "quite incredible" that establishment's then-81-year continuous history, in a relatively young city. By contrast, Di Chiera Brothers had had to close down indefinitely in the intervening year, 2017, due to "... calamities of a personal, professional and pandemic-related nature ...", but it reopened at the end of 2024 after a longer than anticipated hiatus.

== See also ==
- List of sandwiches
- Muffuletta
- Steak sandwich (Australia)
- Submarine sandwich
