= Steak burger =

Steak burger may refer to:

- Steak sandwich (Australia), an Australian dish consisting of a steak served as a sandwich and which is called a steak burger when served on a bun
- Steak burger, a US marketing term for a hamburger ostensibly made with higher-quality meat in the patty
