= List of ordinances of the Legislative Council of Western Australia from 1858 =

This is a list of ordinances of the Legislative Council of Western Australia for the year 1858.

== 1858 ==
Short title, or popular name	Citation	Royal assent
Long title
	21 Vict. No. 12	26 May 1858
An Ordinance to extend and enlarge the Provisions of an Ordinance passed in the twelfth year of the reign of Her present Majesty, intituled "An Ordinance for the Regulation of Gaols, Prisons, and Houses of Correction in the Colony of Western Australia, and for other purposes relating thereto." (Note: 12 Vict. No. 7)
	22 Vict. No. 1	8 September 1858
An Ordinance to naturalize Joannes Antonius Baesjou.
	22 Vict. No. 2	17 September 1858
An Ordinance for the further appropriation of the Revenue for the year 1857, and for the general appropriation of the Revenue for the year 1859.
	22 Vict. No. 3	17 September 1858
An Ordinance for vesting Church of England Lands in Western Australia in the Lord Bishop of Perth, and his Successors. (Repealed by 38 Vict. No. 18)
Roman Catholic Church Lands Ordinance 1858	22 Vict. No. 4	17 September 1858
An Ordinance for vesting Roman Catholic Church Lands in Western Australia in the Roman Catholic Bishop Administrator and his Successors.
	22 Vict. No. 5	17 September 1858
An Ordinance to enable the Governor to borrow Seven Thousand Pounds (Note: £7,000 in 1858 is equivalent to A$700,000 in 2022.) and to apply the same towards the erection of a new Government House. (Note: This was to be the third Government House for Western Australia, completed in 1864.)
Joint Stock Companies Ordinance 1858	22 Vict. No. 6	24 September 1858
An Ordinance for the Incorporation and Regulation of Joint Stock Companies, and other Associations, and for Limiting the Liability of certain of the same.
Jury Ordinance 1858	22 Vict. No. 7	4 October 1858
An Ordinance to alter and amend the Law for regulating the Constitution of Juries and for the Trial of Issues in certain Cases in the Criminal and Civil Courts of Western Australia.
	22 Vict. No. 8	14 October 1858
An Ordinance to vest in Her Majesty a certain Piece of Ground forming a Portion of a Public Thoroughfare, known by the Name of Pier Street, (Note: Pier Street, Perth.) in the City of Perth.
	22 Vict. No. 9	15 October 1858
An Ordinance to naturalize Sanford Duryea.
City of Perth Improvement Ordinance 1858 (repealed)	22 Vict. No. 10	22 October 1858
An Ordinance to alter the existing Law providing for the Improvement of the City of Perth, and to make other Regulations instead thereof. (Repealed by Municipal Institutions' Act 1871 (34 Vict. No. 6))

== Sources ==
- "legislation.wa.gov.au".
