= Brisbane Street, Perth =

Street in Perth, Western Australia

Coordinates: 31°56′36″S 115°51′50″E

Brisbane Street Western Australia

General information
- Type: Road
- Length: 1.1 km (0.7 mi)
- Route number(s): State Route 53 southbound (Beaufort Street to William Street)

Major junctions
- East end: Bulwer Street (State Route 72); Smith Street
- Beaufort Street (State Route 53); William Street (State Route 53)
- West end: Palmerston Street

Location(s)
- Major suburbs: Perth

Brisbane Street is a major cross street located in the suburb of Perth. It runs from Palmerston Street through to Bulwer Street, and intersects major roads Lake Street, William Street, and Beaufort Street. The section between Beaufort Street and Stirling Street was called Padbury Street until circa 1917. The street was named after Thomas Brisbane, Governor of New South Wales.

"Among other streets which Dr Battye said were named after English and Colonial public men were Aberdeen, Newcastle, Brisbane, Bulwer (Bulwer-Lyton), Moore, Short, Hill, Irwin, Hutt and Milligan Streets and Harvest Terrace."

The street had the McDowall's service station, as well as a Methodist church.

== History ==
Parts of Brisbane Street formerly carried one-way traffic, and were converted to carry two-way traffic in 2019.

== Intersections ==
LGA	Location	km	mi	Destinations	Notes
Vincent	Perth	0	0.0	Smith Street / Bulwer Street (State Route 72)	Roundabout
Vincent	Perth	0.05	0.031	Pier Street	Give way sign controlled, giving Brisbane Street priority
Vincent	Perth	0.12	0.075	Lacey Street	
Vincent	Perth	0.21	0.13	Stirling Street	Dogbone roundabout
Vincent	Perth	0.35	0.22	Cul-de-sac	Terminus of eastern side of Brisbane Street
Gap in road
Vincent	Perth	0.35	0.22	Beaufort Street (State Route 53)	Traffic light controlled; terminus of western side of Brisbane Street; State Route 53 southbound concurrency terminus
Vincent	Perth	0.45	0.28	Lindsay Street	
Vincent	Perth	0.55	0.34	Astone Lane	
Vincent	Perth	0.6	0.37	Lane Street	
Vincent	Perth	0.65	0.40	William Street (State Route 53)	Traffic light controlled; no right turn from William Street northbound to Brisbane Street eastbound; State Route 53 southbound concurrency terminus
Vincent	Perth	0.75	0.47	Brisbane Place	
Vincent	Perth	0.95	0.59	Lake Street	Stop sign controlled, giving Brisbane Street priority
Vincent	Perth	1	0.62	Dangan Street	
Vincent	Perth	1.1	0.68	Shule Lane	
Vincent	Perth	1.1	0.68	Palmerston Street	Roundabout
1.000 mi = 1.609 km; 1.000 km = 0.621 mi: Concurrency terminus; Incomplete access
