= The Bell Tower Times =

Australian satirical media organization

- Embrace the Human Zoo
- Type: Satirical newspaper
- Format: Website
- Editor: ‘Belle Tower’ (Pseudonymous)
- Headquarters: Perth, Western Australia
- Website: www.thebelltowertimes.com

The Bell Tower Times is an Australian digital media organization that publishes satirical articles on various topics, with a Western Australian focus. The outlet is based in Perth. It originated as a Facebook page, and began publishing independently online in the late 2010s. It is named after the Bell Tower.

The outlet typically publishes under the pen name 'Belle Tower'. Its articles cover current events, both real and fictional, parodying the tone and format of traditional news organisations.

One of the main series of articles of the publication is 'The Human Zoo', a 'satirical microscope' on various stereotypes and characters that one might find in the suburbs of Perth. Examples of fictional characters profiled in this series include "Midland's Finest", "Ms Facebook Mumma", and "Mr Anti Gay Marriage". The page was also known for posting clips of vehicles crashing into the Bayswater Bridge.

The primary author and founder of the media organisation is presently not publicly known. In 2023, PerthNow has listed the 'mystery person behind the bell tower times' within its 'ultimate list of the Perthiest Perthonalities'.

== Reach ==
Content from the page has been syndicated or featured by other more mainstream news outlets, often as a source of photographs for news events. Some that have done so include Yahoo News, Hit Network, The West Australian, PerthNow, New Zealand Herald, News.com.au, Seven News, The Mirror, and Pedestrian TV. It has also been quoted as a source of public comment by reporters. Its posts are sometimes the primary source for articles by other outlets.

== See also ==
- The Onion
- The Betoota Advocate
- Conti Roll
