= J. & E. Ledger =

Engineering company in Perth, Western Australia

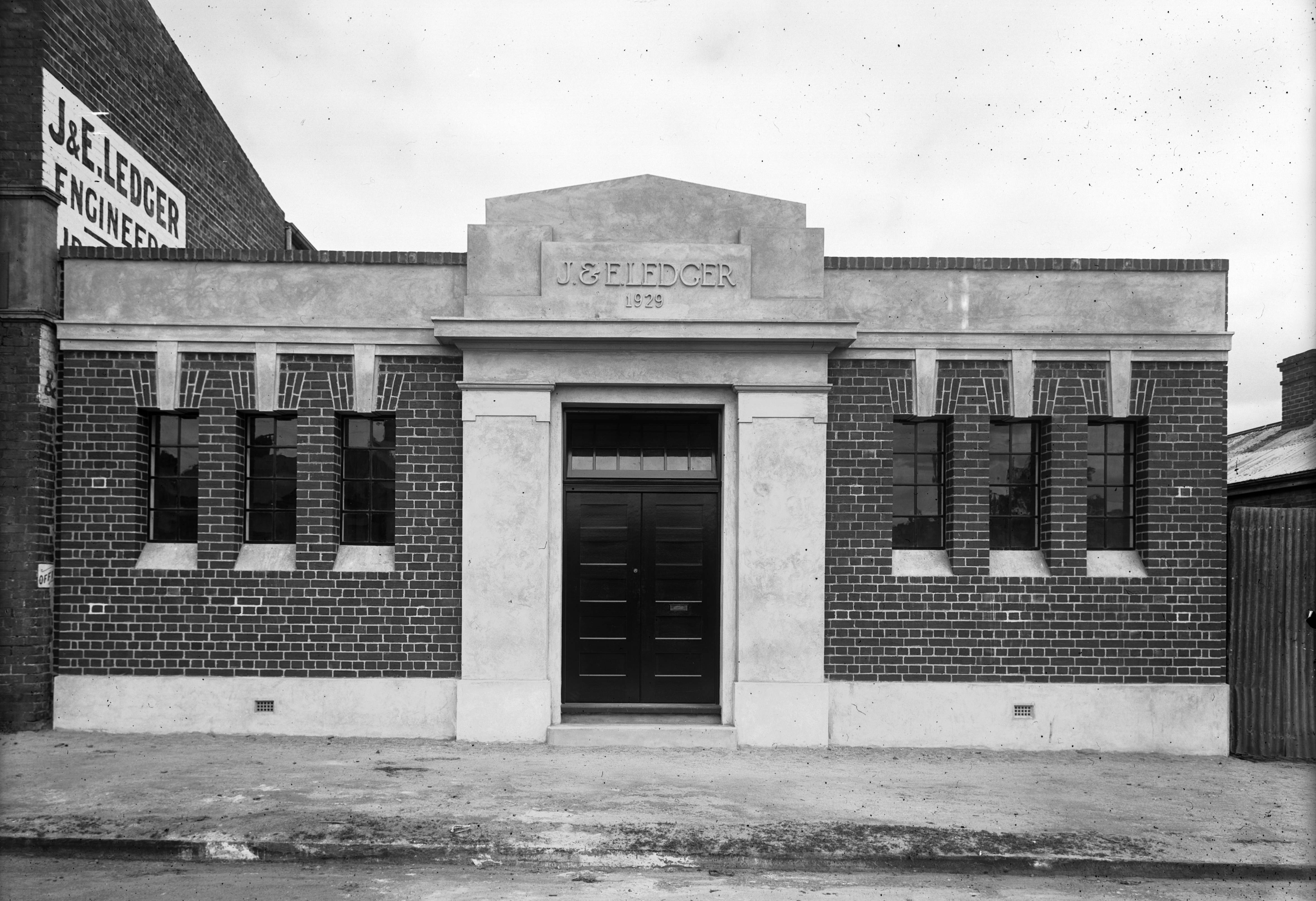
The firm's new premises in Pier Street, soon after construction in 1929.

J. & E. Ledger was an engineering company based in Perth, Western Australia.

In its early years it was known as Ironfounders, Ironworkers and Tinsmiths.

In the 1890s the firm had a factory in William Street.

The firm had a foundry utilised for materials for the Goldfields Water Supply Scheme.

In 1929 it was located at premises in 231 Pier Street.

In the 1960s the company name had changed to Ledger Engineering.
