= Barrack Square =

Public space in Perth, Western Australia

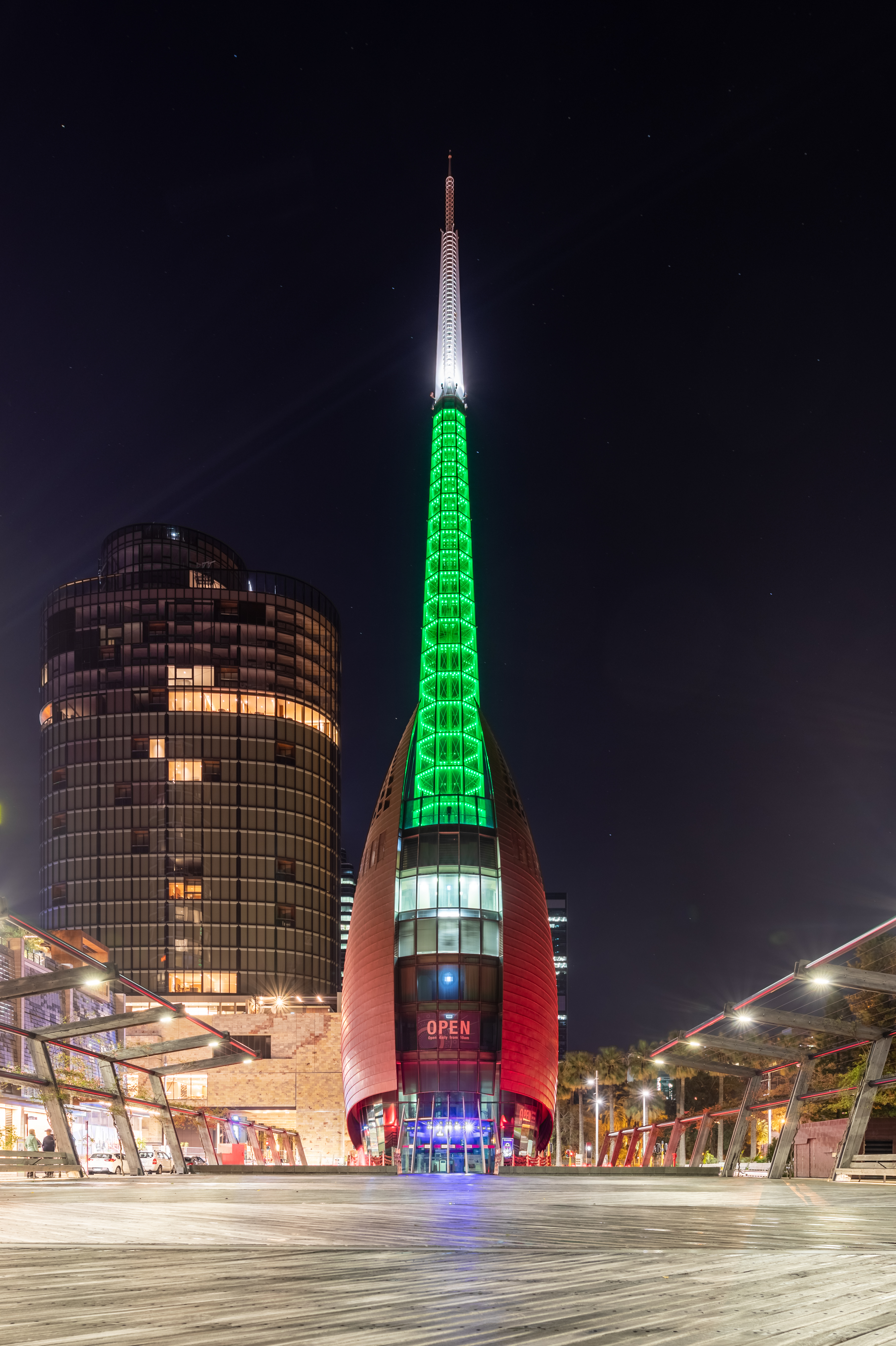
- Barrack Square at night with focus on the bell tower
- Location: Barrack Street, Perth
- Interactive map of Barrack Square
- Coordinates: 31°57′32.90″S 115°51′29.33″E

Western Australia Heritage Register
- Type: State Registered Place
- Designated: 15 October 1999
- Reference no.: 4031

Barrack Square is an open public square on the foreshore of Perth Water on the Swan River, located at the southern end of Barrack Street near the central business district of Perth, Western Australia. Constructed between 1905 and 1907, the square has gone through major redevelopments in the 2010s and 2020s.

== Geography ==
Barrack Square is located along Perth's foreshore where it protrudes into the Perth Water area of the Swan River; the river makes up the square's southern and eastern boundaries. To its east, it is bounded by Elizabeth Quay and The Towers at Elizabeth Quay, and to the north by Riverside Drive. Since the development of Elizabeth Quay, Barrack Square became flanked on its right and left sides by several skyscrapers. To its left is the DoubleTree by Hilton Perth Waterfront hotel, which opened on 15 December 2020. On the other side are The Towers by Elizabeth Quay, which completed construction and opened in 2019.

Images of the area around Barrack Square are displayed blow:

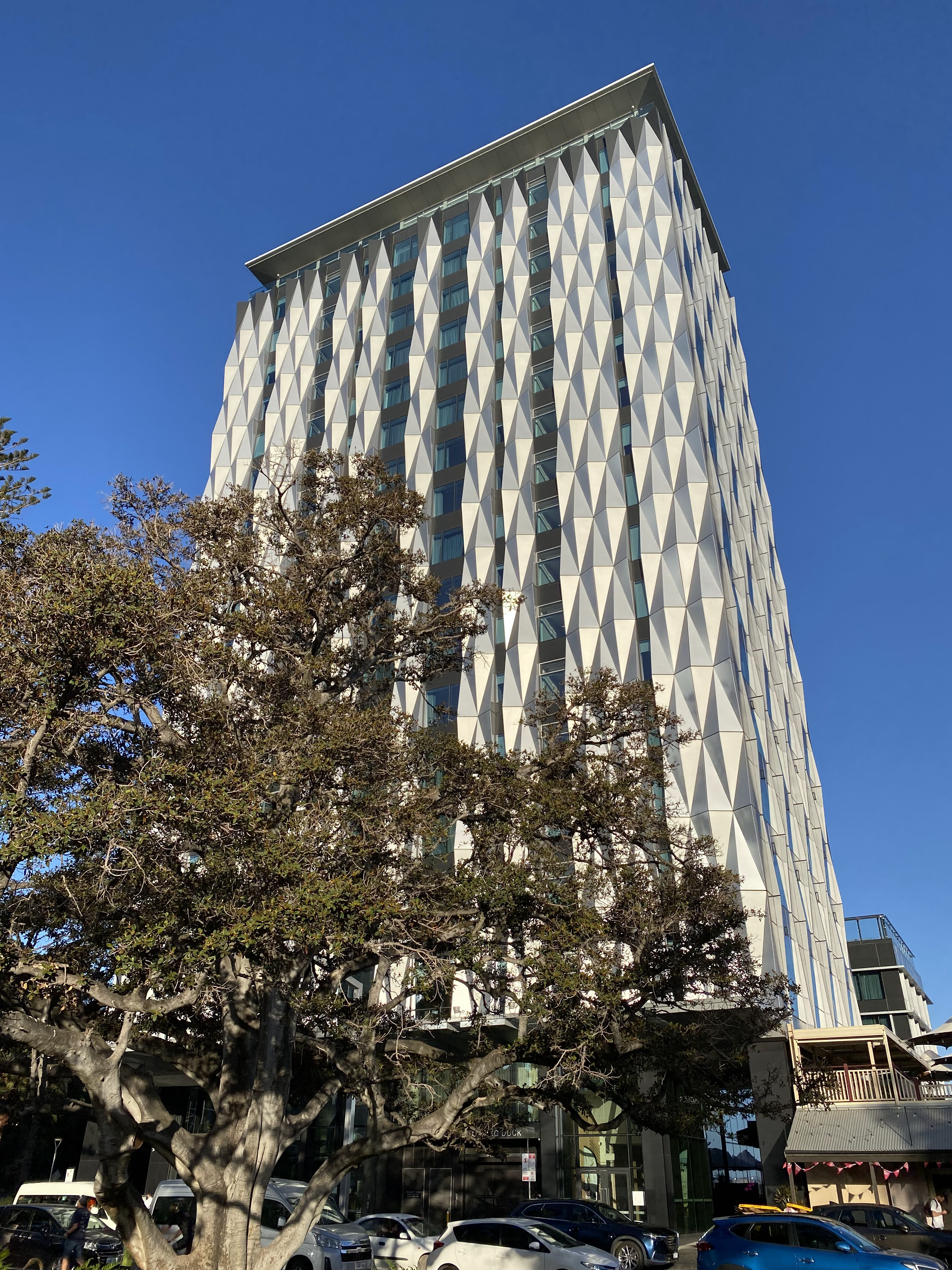
The DoubleTree by Hilton hotel

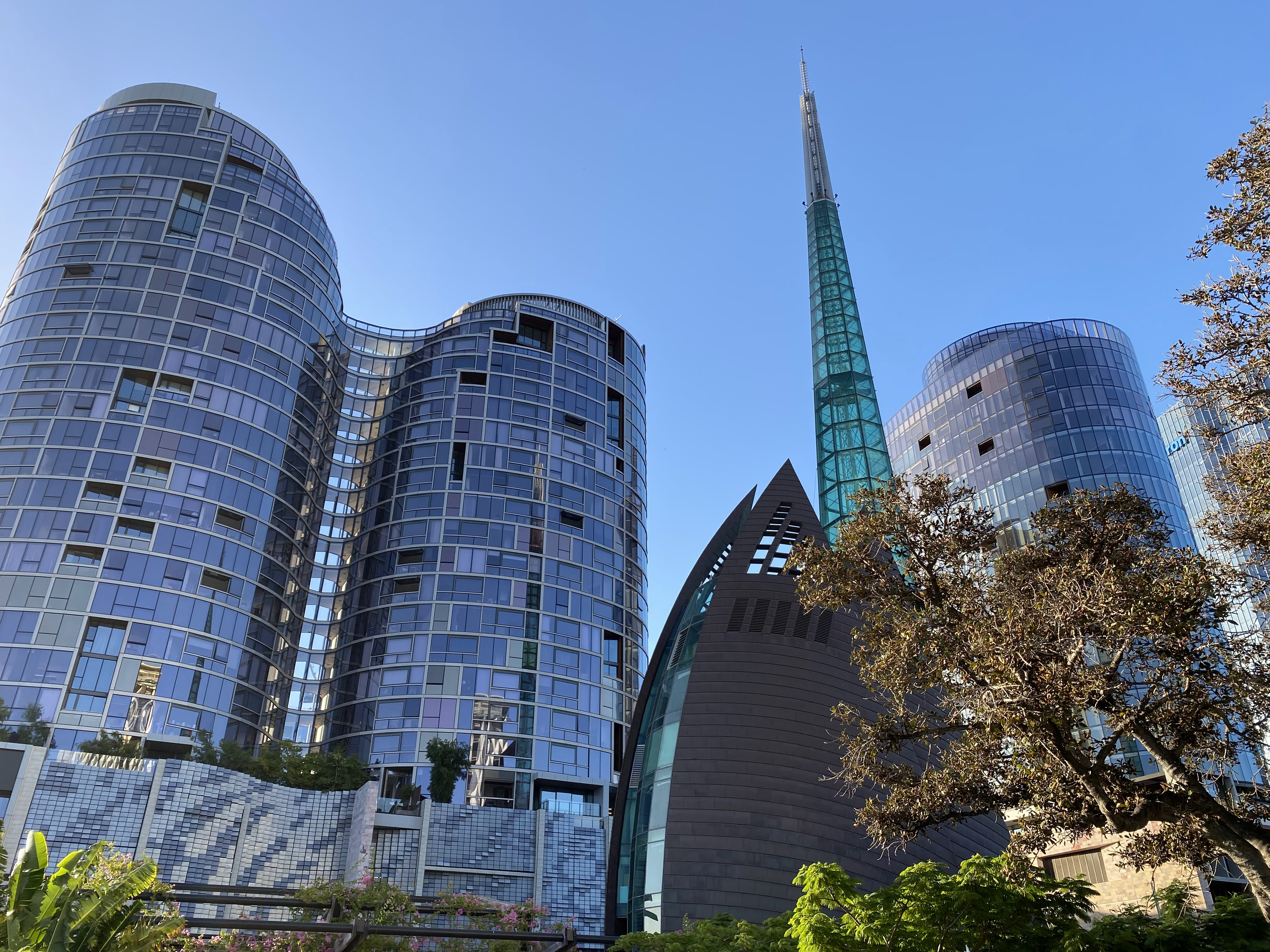
The Towers by Elizabeth Quay with the Bell Tower

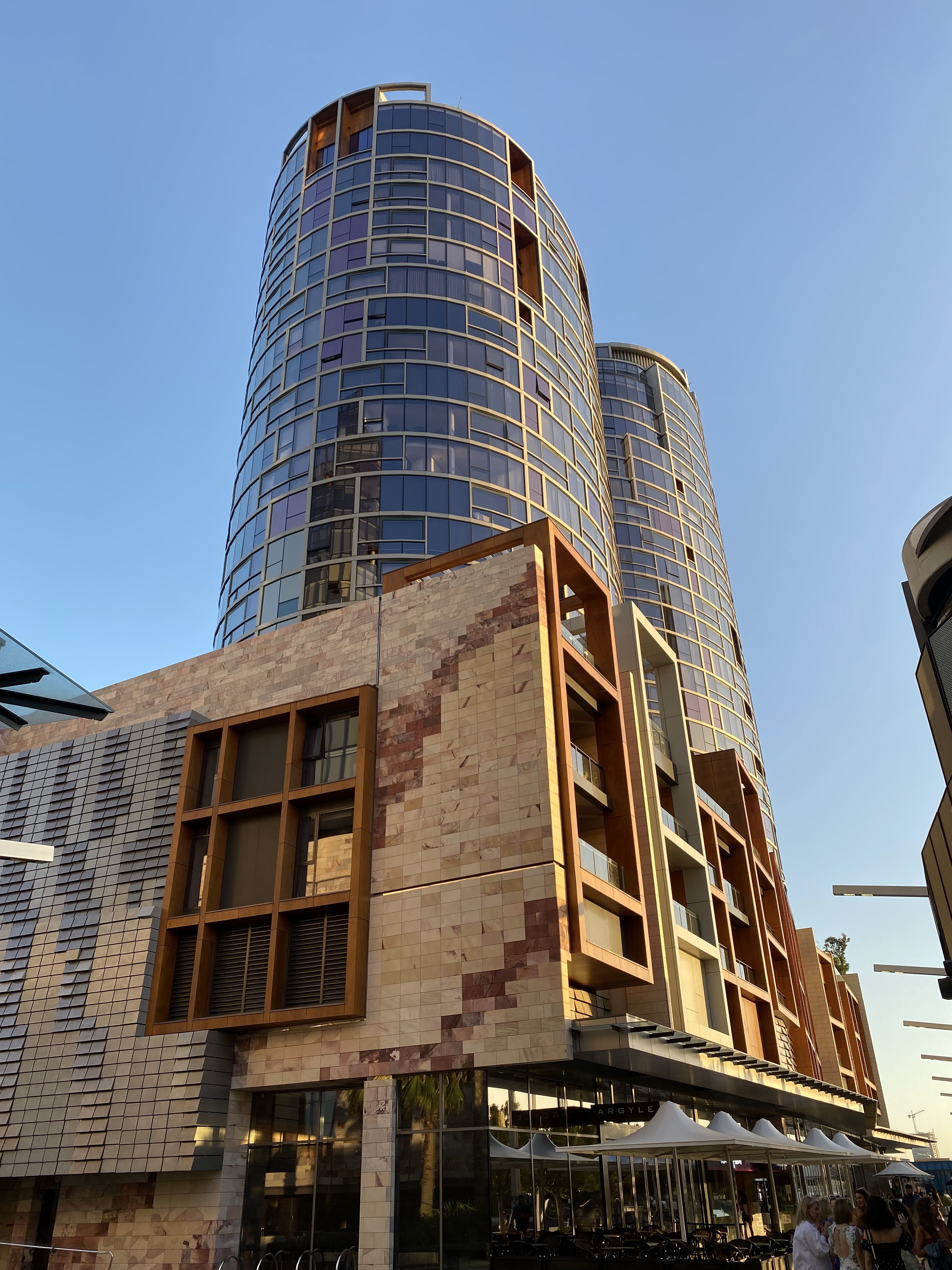
Alternative view of The Towers

== History ==
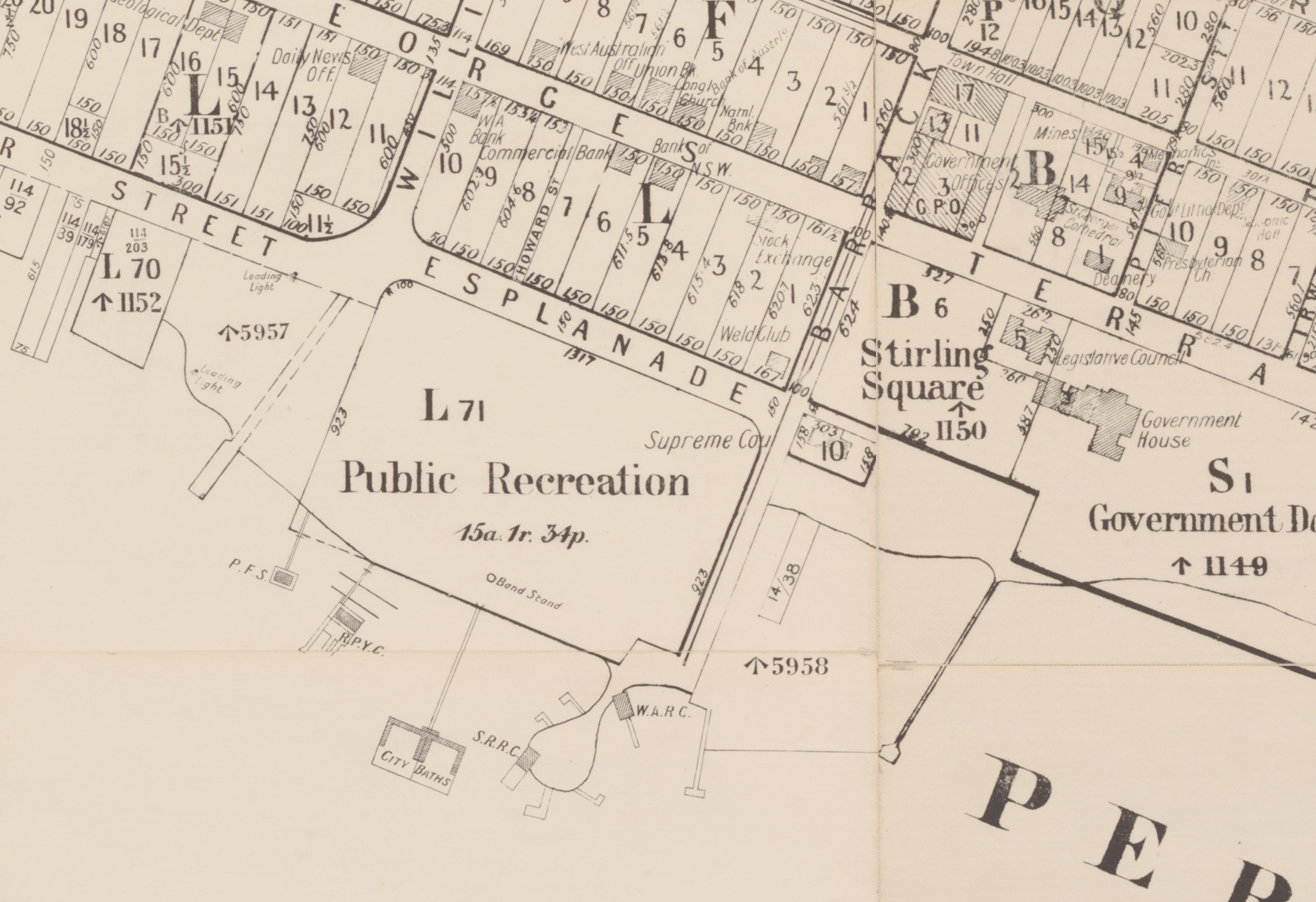
Map of Barrack Square area before its construction, c. 1900

Since 1845, the area at the end of Barrack Street on the Swan River had been the location of a jetty, providing river transport on the river. Barrack Square was subsequently constructed between 1905 and 1907 on land reclaimed from the river. The square was originally built with its paths being laid out to form a British Union Jack, earning its first name as Union Jack Square. However, the modern square no longer bears its original Union Jack pattern. The square was also called Flagstaff Square and Harper Square.

In the winter of 1926, severe flooding of the Swan River caused Union Jack Square to be submerged under water.

Under Premier Richard Court, construction on the Swan Bells began in 1999 as Perth's major project to celebrate the new millennium. The bell tower's construction was controversial, with it being called a waste of money or a monument built by Court to himself. It opened on 10 December 2000. Within the bell tower are twelve bells from St Martin-in-the-Fields, which have existed since before the 14th century before being recast during the reign of Queen Elizabeth I.

=== Redevelopment ===
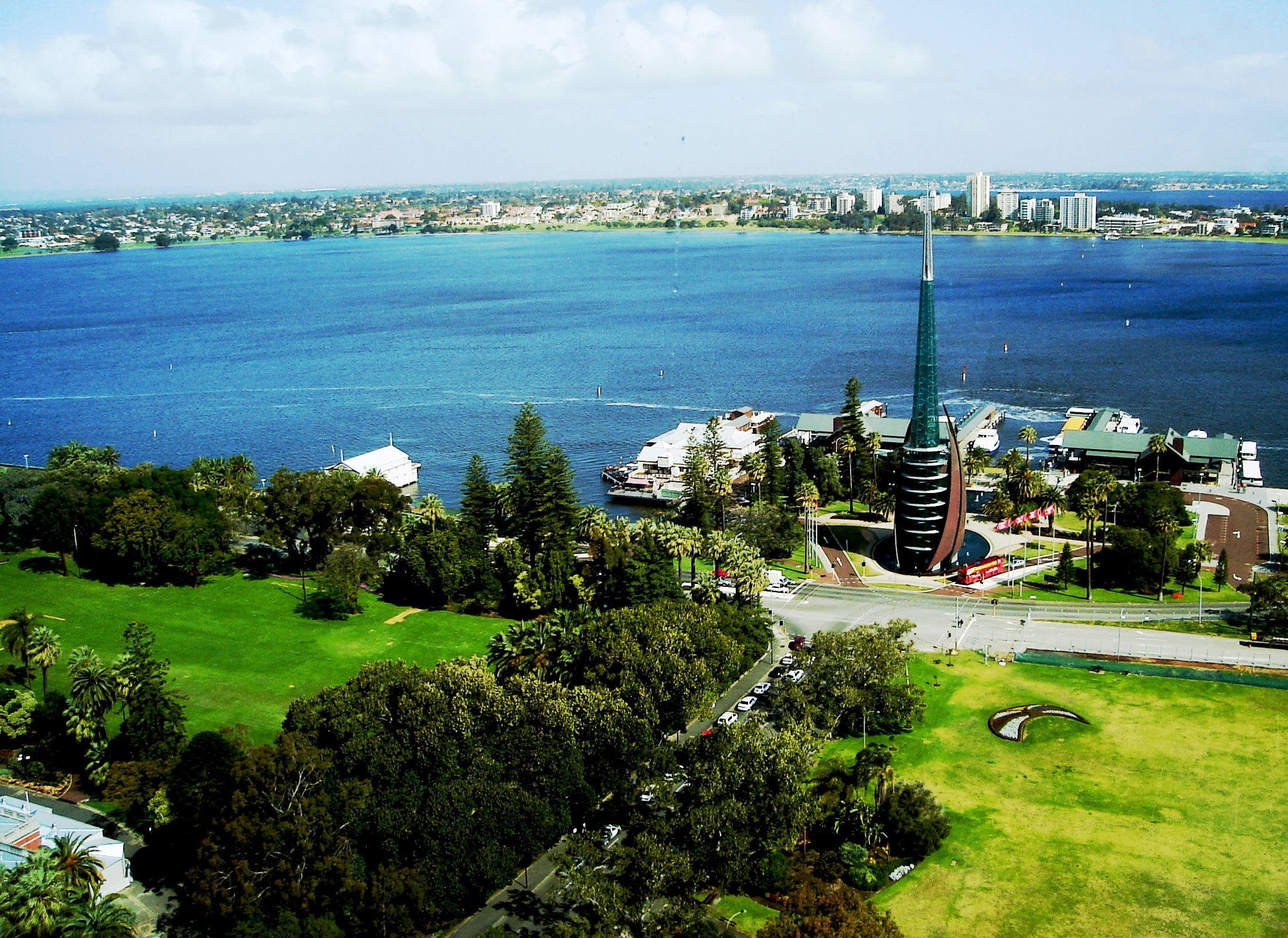
Barrack Square in 2005 before major redevelopments

As part of the 2012 Perth waterfront development and the construction of Elizabeth Quay, the Metropolitan Redevelopment Authority began planning and surveying changes to the Barrack Square area.

As a result of this construction, the 16 businesses operating around Barrack Street began suffering financial issues from a decline in visitors. Construction on the Quay severely restricted access to many of them. Because of this, business owners began seeking compensation from the government of Colin Barnett with support of the opposition Labor Party. The government had provided these businesses with three months of $45,000 in rent relief, but had did not extend the relief period. In 2015, they began threatening legal action against the government.

In 2022, Barrack Square was awarded the RAIA Civic Design Award for its urban design.

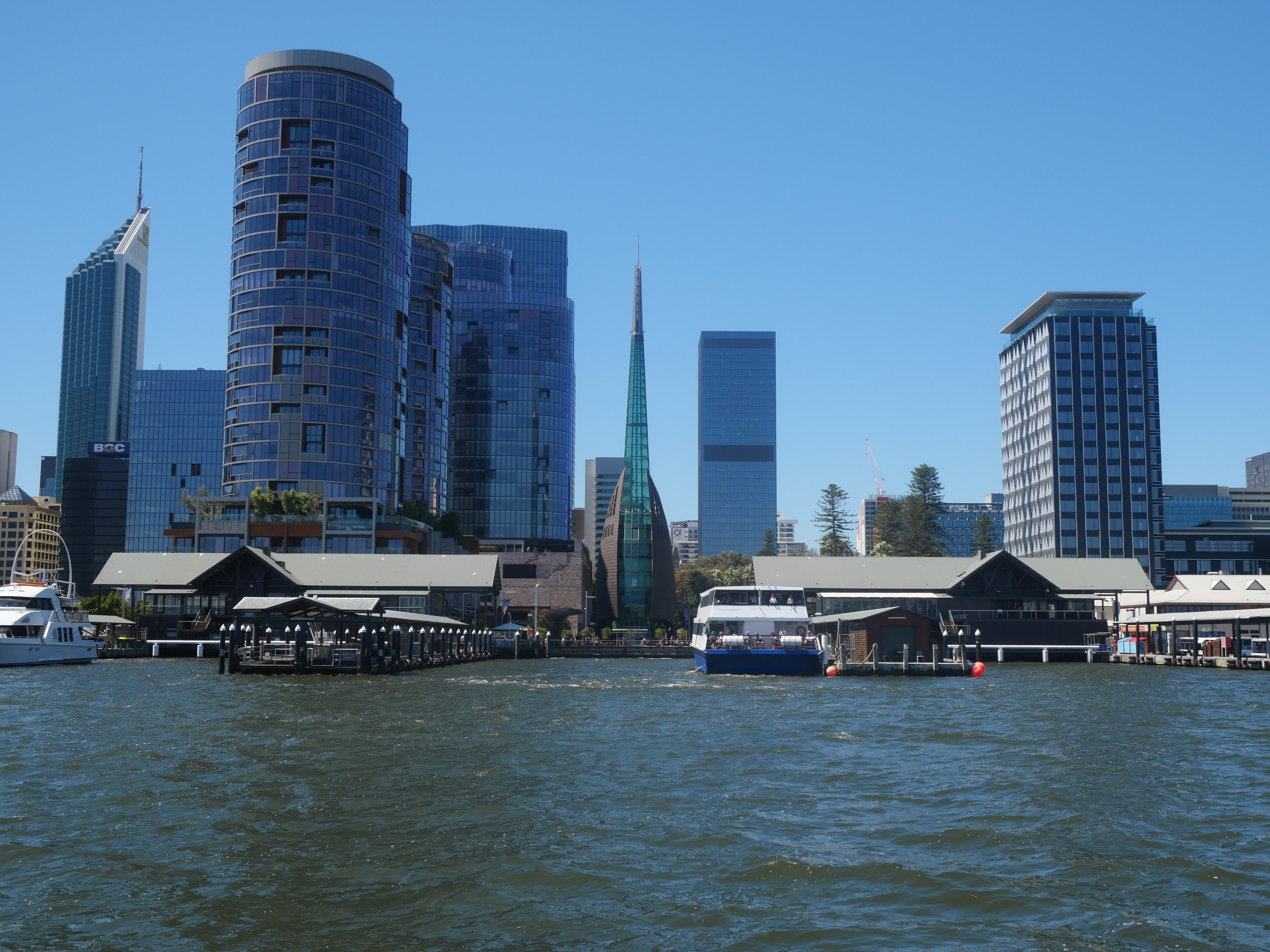
Barrack Square as viewed from the Swan River

== Landmarks ==
There exists several sculptures of black swans around Barrack Square. Among them are four bronze swan sculptures along Barrack Square road opposite the DoubleTree by Hilton Hotel, unveiled in 2000.

As part of millennium celebrations, over 2000 signatures by students from pre-primary to Year 12 across Western Australia were etched into 2375 copper tiles. The tiles were laid around the Bell Tower until construction on Elizabeth Quay forced them to be destroyed as they could not be removed intact. However, they were photographed and replicated for a new memorial called the Signature Ring. The Signature Ring was unveiled on 19 November 2015.

A sundial memorial dedicated to Dutch explorer Willem de Vlamingh, who was an early European explorer of Western Australia, existed at Barrack Square besides the Bell Tower after being dedicated on 15 October 2007. Development on Elizabeth Quay and Barrack Square, however, forced the memorial to be relocated in 2012. For several years, the memorial existed in storage before the City of Perth council decided on relocated it near the Narrows Interchange.

Images of the landmarks mentioned above are displayed below:

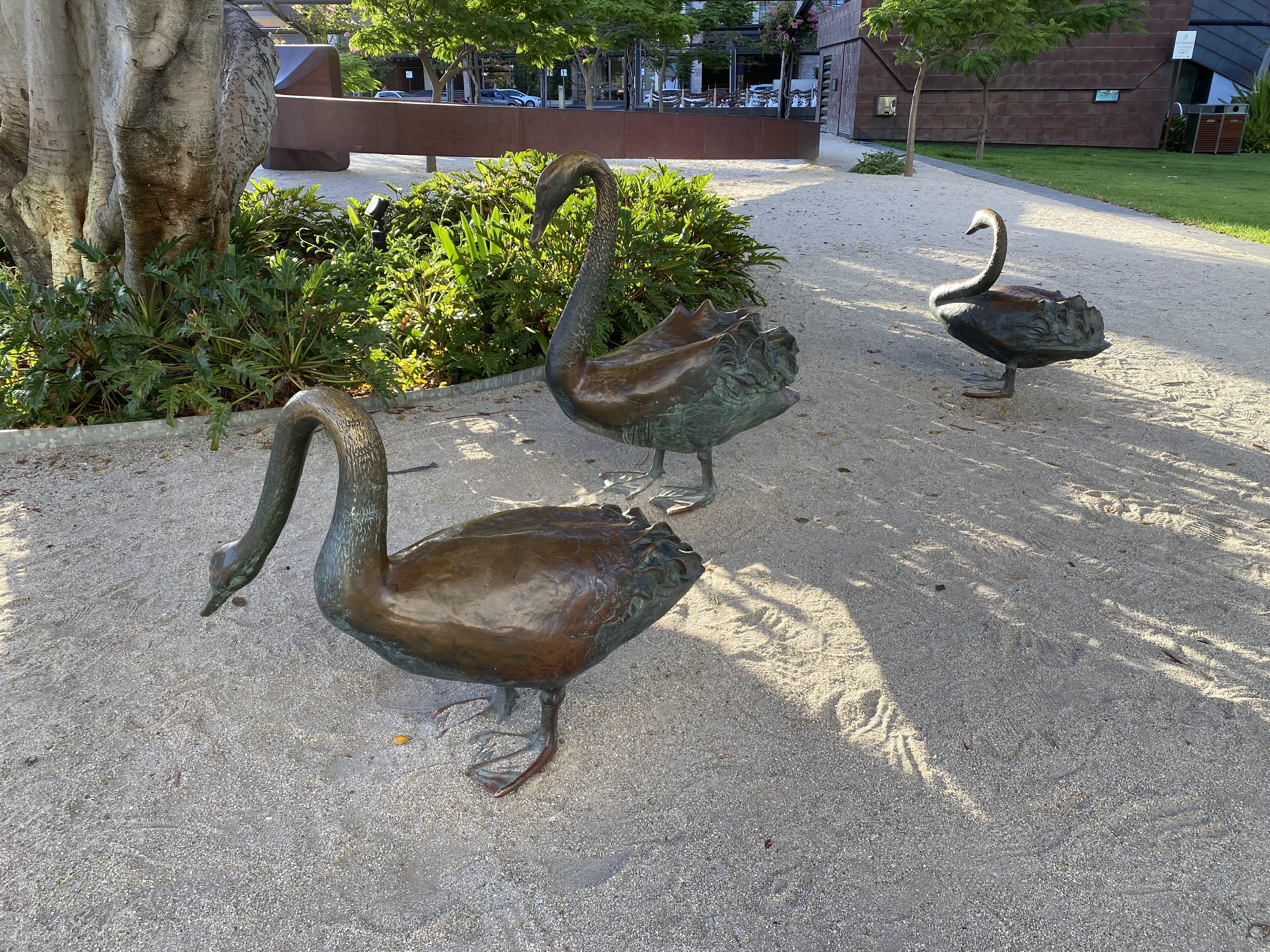
The bronze Black Swans

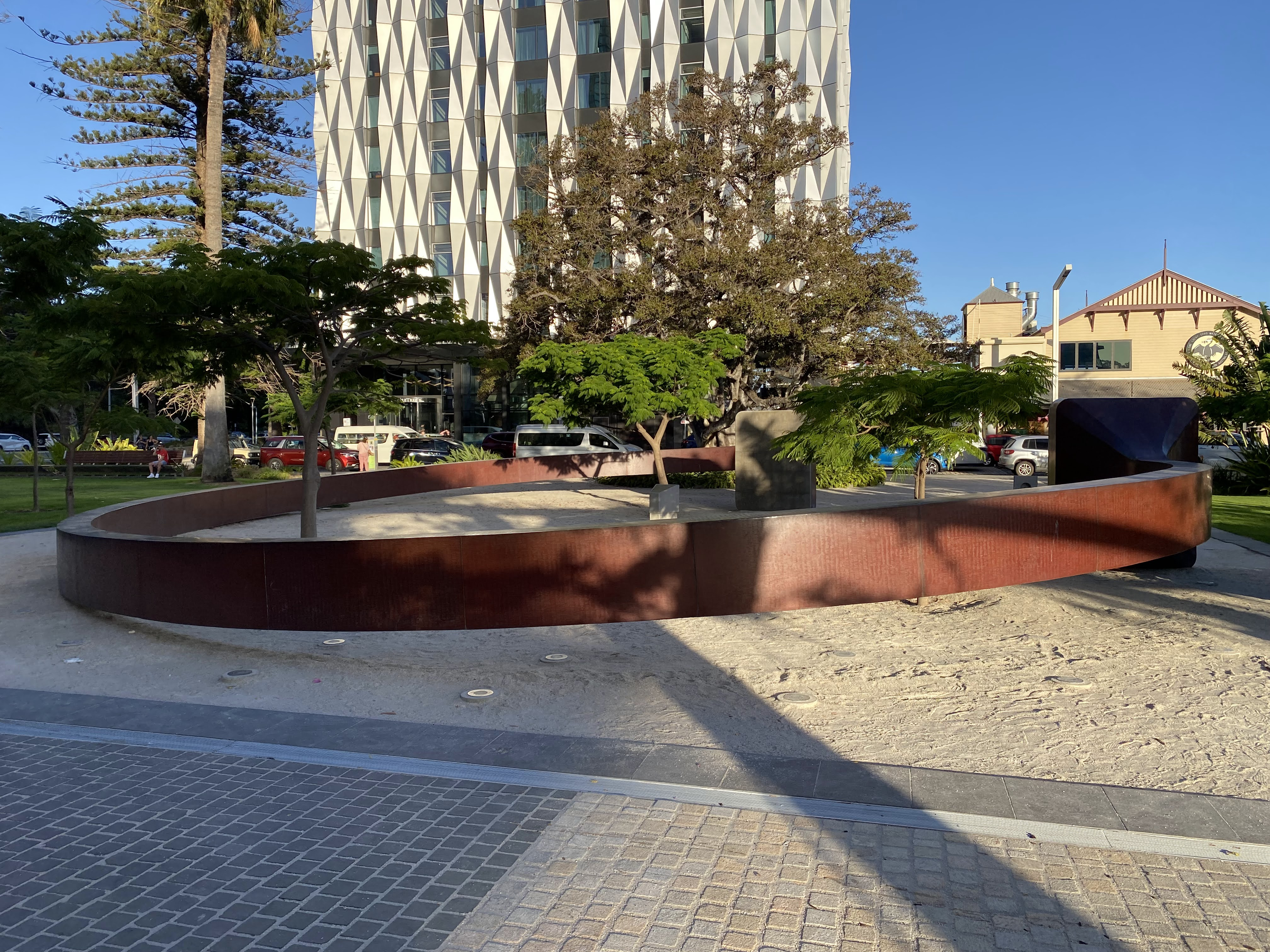
Signature Ring

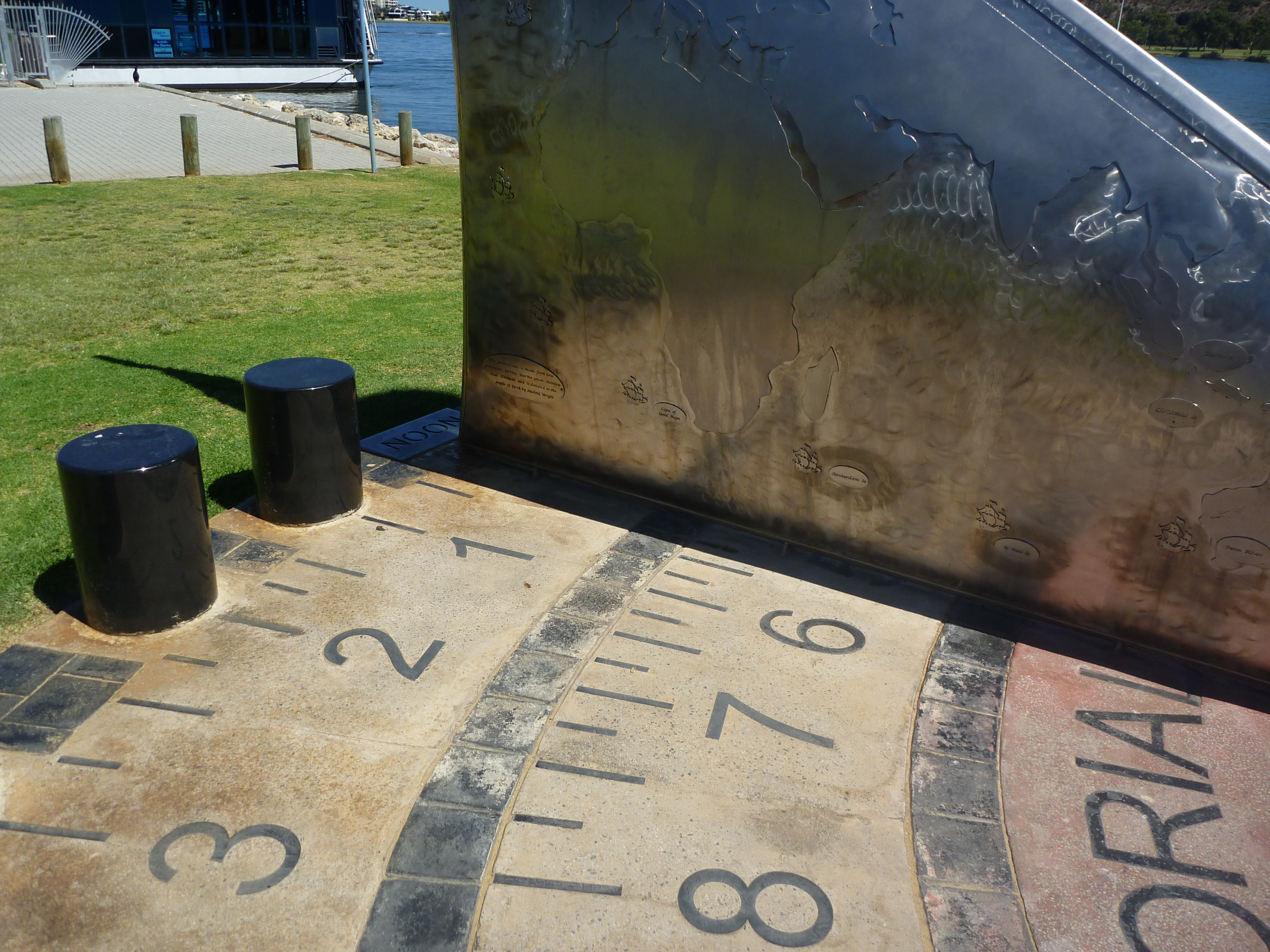
The sundial before its relocation

== Usage ==
The Swan Bells are located at Barrack Square, along with cafés, restaurants and jetties.

There are six jetties (so the area is sometimes referred to as the Barrack Street Jetties), including the Barrack Street Jetty which was formerly used by Transperth ferries. Commercial companies also use the jetties for trips to Rottnest Island and river cruises.

The West Australian Rowing Club has had a presence adjacent to the square since the nineteenth century.
