= Swan Bells =

Bell tower in Perth, Western Australia

Coordinates: 31°57′32″S 115°51′30″E

Perth Bell Tower at night

The Swan Bells are a set of 18 bells hanging in a specially built 82.5-metre (271 ft) copper and glass campanile in Perth, Western Australia. The tower is commonly known as the Bell Tower and the Swan Bell Tower.

Taking their name from the Swan River, which their tower overlooks, and forming a sixteen-bell peal with two extra chromatic notes, they are the second largest set of change ringing bells in the world, the largest being Christ Church Cathedral, Dublin, which has 19 bells.

Twelve of the set are historic bells from St Martin-in-the-Fields church in Trafalgar Square in London; six others, cast in recent times by the Whitechapel Bell Foundry, round off the set. The St Martin-in-the-Fields bells were donated to the State of Western Australia as part of the 1988 Australian bicentenary celebrations; the additional bells were cast with a subsequent donation of metals mined in Western Australia. The six newer bells include five that were presented to the University of Western Australia, the City of Perth and to the people of Western Australia by the City of London, the City of Westminster and a consortium of British and Australian mining companies, and one bell commissioned by the Western Australian Government.

The Swan Bells are administered by a not-for-profit organisation called Swan Bells Foundation. In 2024 the foundation reported that the Swan Bells received 38,947 visitors between July 2023 and June 2024.

== History of the St Martin-in-the-Fields bells ==
The St Martin-in-the-Fields bells can be traced to before the 14th century. They were recast in the 16th century by order of Queen Elizabeth I and again between 1725 and 1770 by members of the Rudhall family of bell founders from Gloucester. Due to be recast leading up to 1870 instead they were tuned and restored at London's Whitechapel Bell Foundry and donated to Western Australia, on the initiative of local bellringer and businessman Laith Reynolds. They are rare in that they are one of the few sets of royal bells, and more so since they are the only set known to have left England. The bells are also known to have rung as the explorer James Cook set sail on the voyage in which he reached Australia.

Bell specifications
Bell number	Weight (kg)	Note	Casting date
Treble	241	D#	1998
2	238	C#	1988
3	263	B#	1988
Flat 3	261	B	1988
4	254	A#	1988
5	279	G#	1758
6	263	F#	1770
7	284	E#	1758
8	300	D#	1725
9	370	C#	1725
10	390	B#	1725
Flat 10	453	B	1988
11	486	A#	1725
12	589	G#	1725
13	728	F#	1725
14	831	E#	1725
15	1,088	D#	1725
Tenor	1,480	C#	1726

== The bell tower ==
Video of the Swan Bells ringing

The tower was designed by the local architects Hames Sharley. The 18 bells have a combined weight of about 9 tonnes (20,000 lb) and, when rung, exert considerable forces on the support structure. To achieve the required rigidity, the six-story bell chamber was made with reinforced concrete cast in situ. The bell chamber was designed by the structural engineering firm Arup.

Soundproof louvres and doors are used to muffle the sound or direct the noise towards the city or the river as required. The glass-clad spire is designed using spokes that radiate horizontally from a centrally positioned axle, declining in width as it rises to a point. The solid-steel columns of the spire are rectangular and the concrete bell chamber is enveloped in 30-metre-tall (98 ft) copper sails and glass.

The redeveloped Barrack Square precinct, which surrounds the tower, includes reflection pools as well as cafes, restaurants, shops and cycling and walking paths.

An inlaid path made of ceramic tiles initially surrounded the tower, with each tile consisting of a list of some of the youngest and oldest cohorts of students from nearly every school in Western Australia from 1999, arranged alphabetically by school name. As of March 2014, the tiles were removed as part of the Elizabeth Quay project, but have since been reinstalled in a new artwork to the east of the tower.

In 2018, to commemorate the centenary of the World War One armistice on 11 November, a large 6.5-tonne (14,000 lb) bell was cast by VEEM Limited, Canning Vale. Unlike the other bells in the tower, this is swung electronically using a motor, supplied by a Belgian firm. It is known as the Great ANZAC Bell.

Since 2013 the area around Barrack Street Jetty has undergone redevelopment; this included removal of part of the reflecting pool and creation of a boardwalk in front of the Bell Tower. The work is part of a larger foreshore project that also incorporates the Elizabeth Quay development.

== Controversy ==
The A$5.5-million building, equivalent to A$9.8 million in 2022, was built to commemorate the new millennium, but at the time the government and the Premier of Western Australia, Richard Court, received a fair amount of criticism from locals who opposed it, calling it a wasteful expenditure. However, 15 years after the opening, Peter Offen of Heritage Perth stated that the tower was a success, as it had become a tourist draw and had made Perth a worldwide destination for campanologists.

== Gallery ==
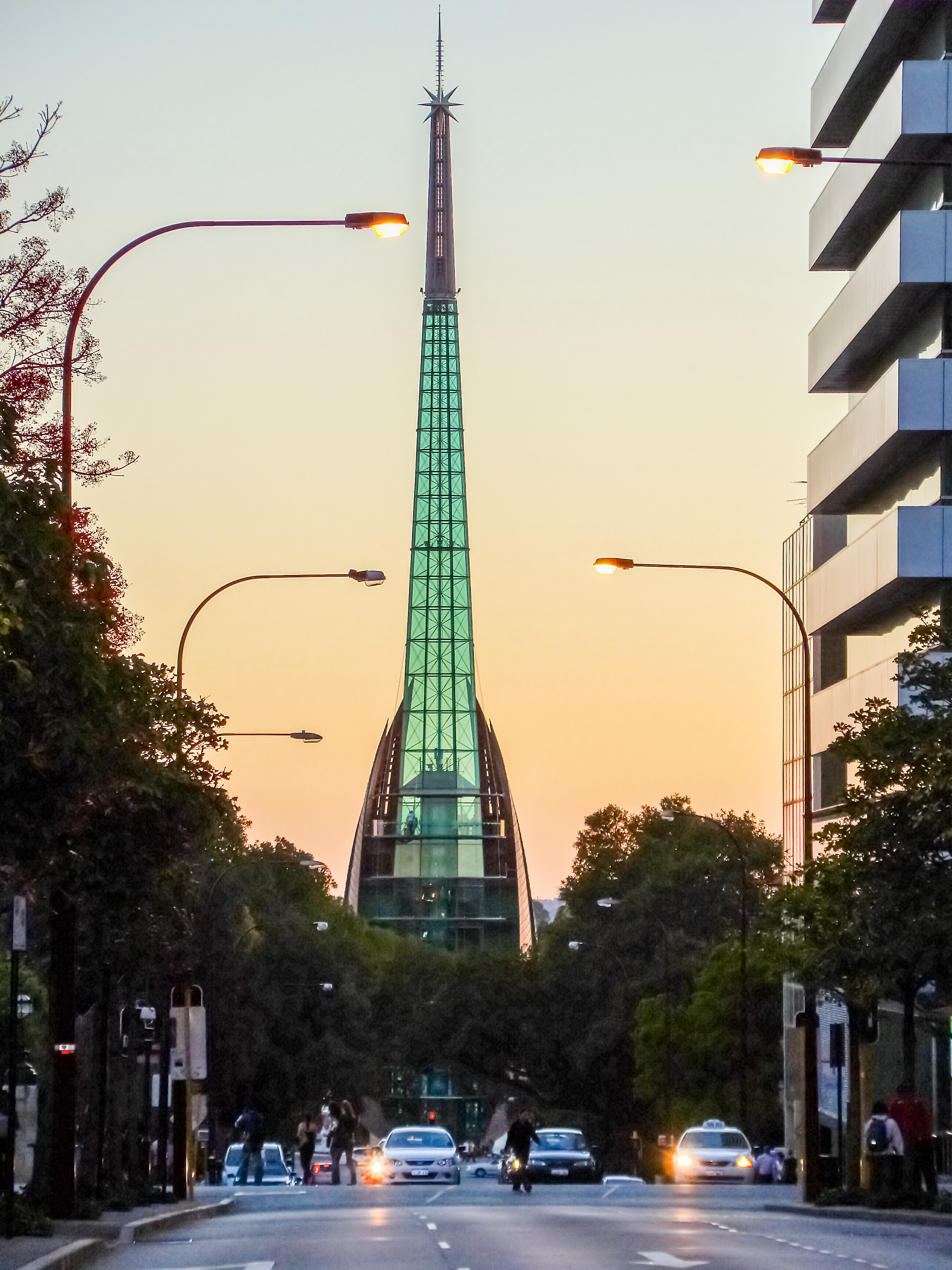
As seen from Barrack Street at dusk

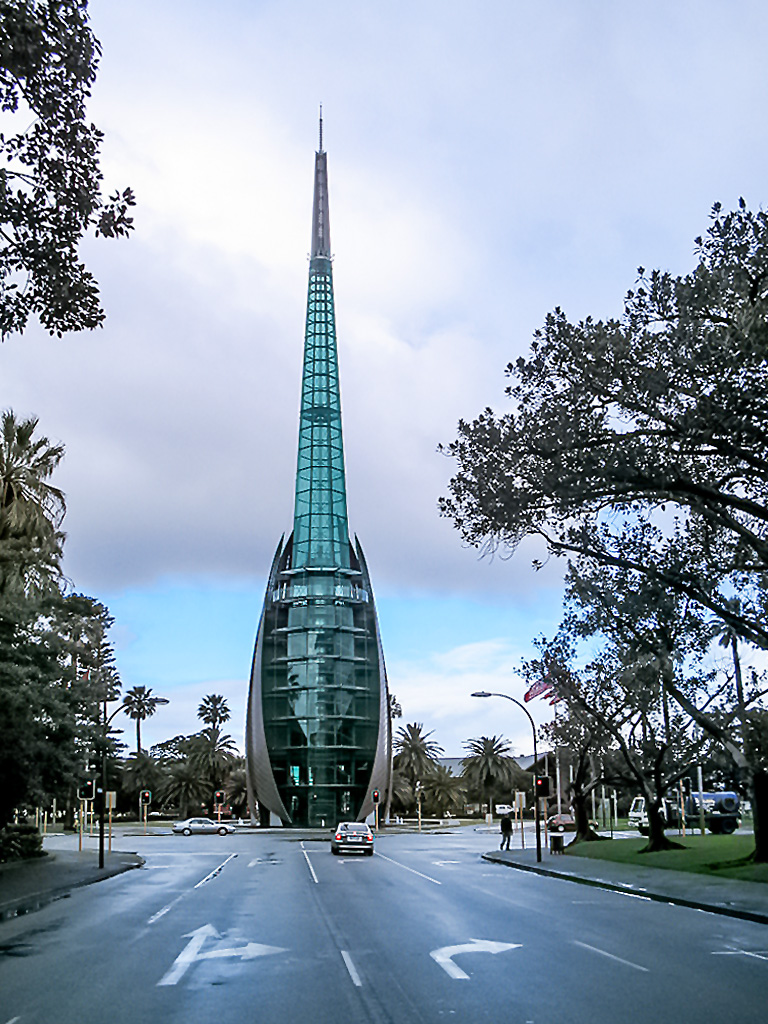

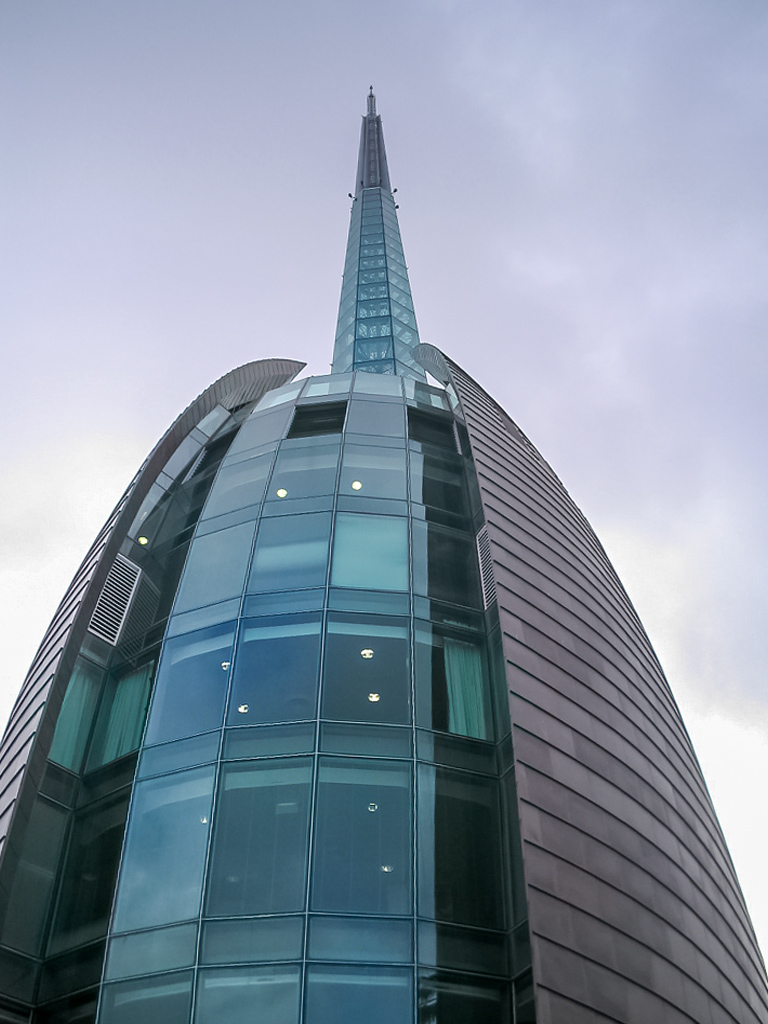

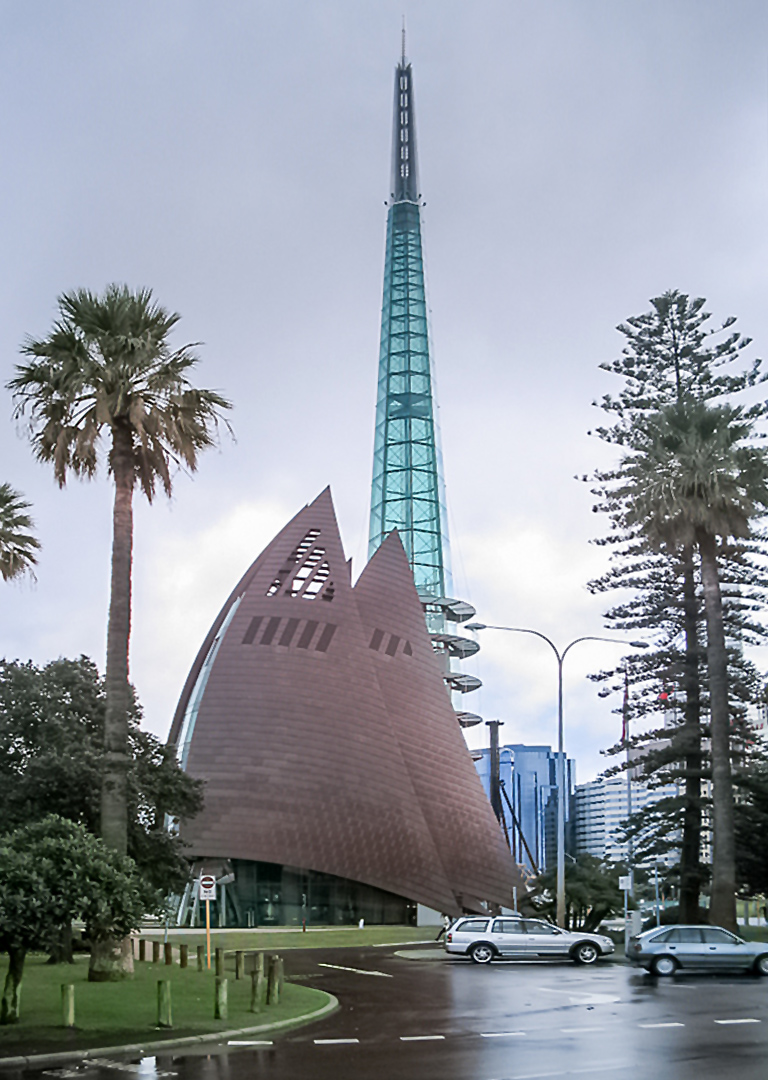

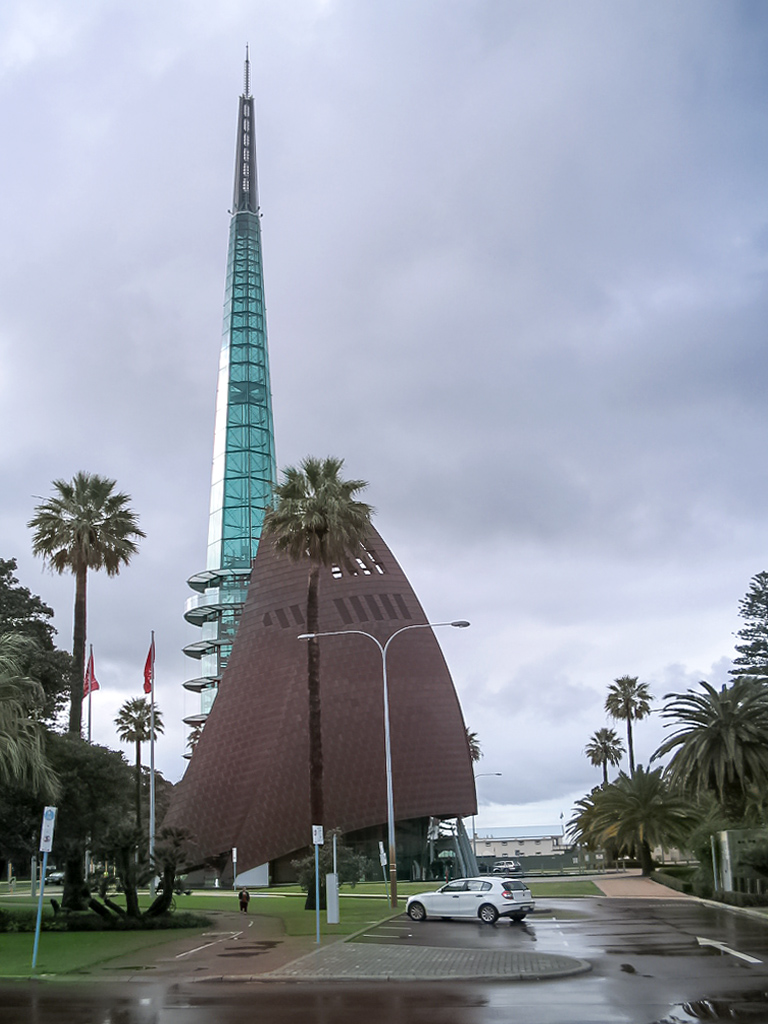

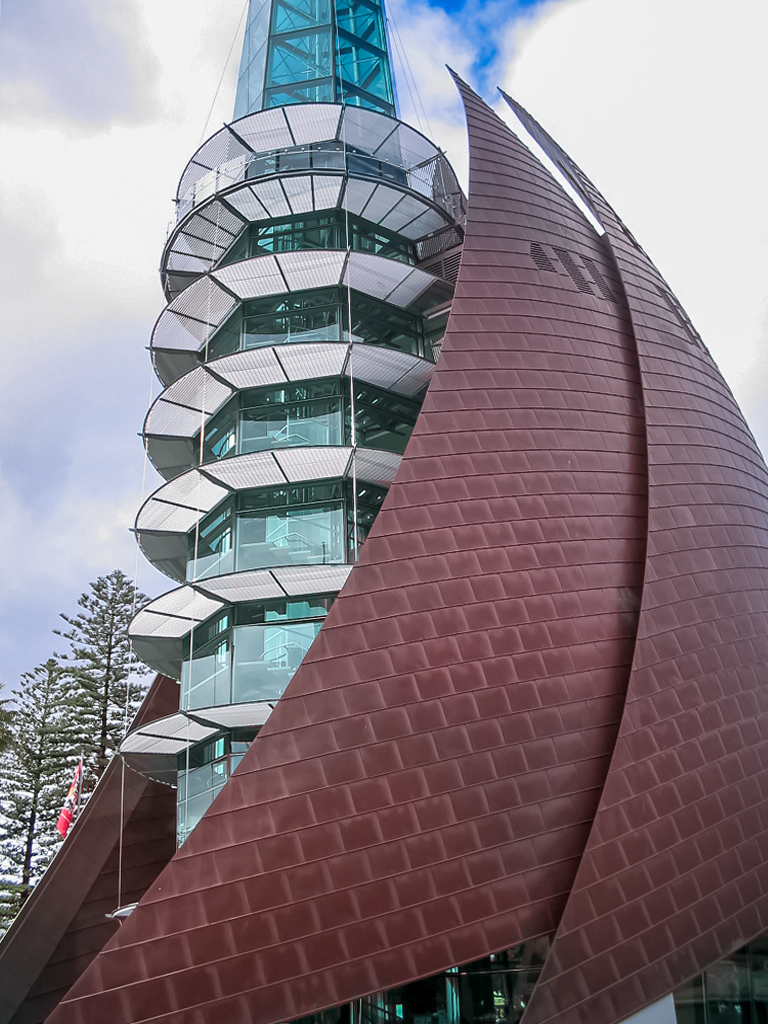

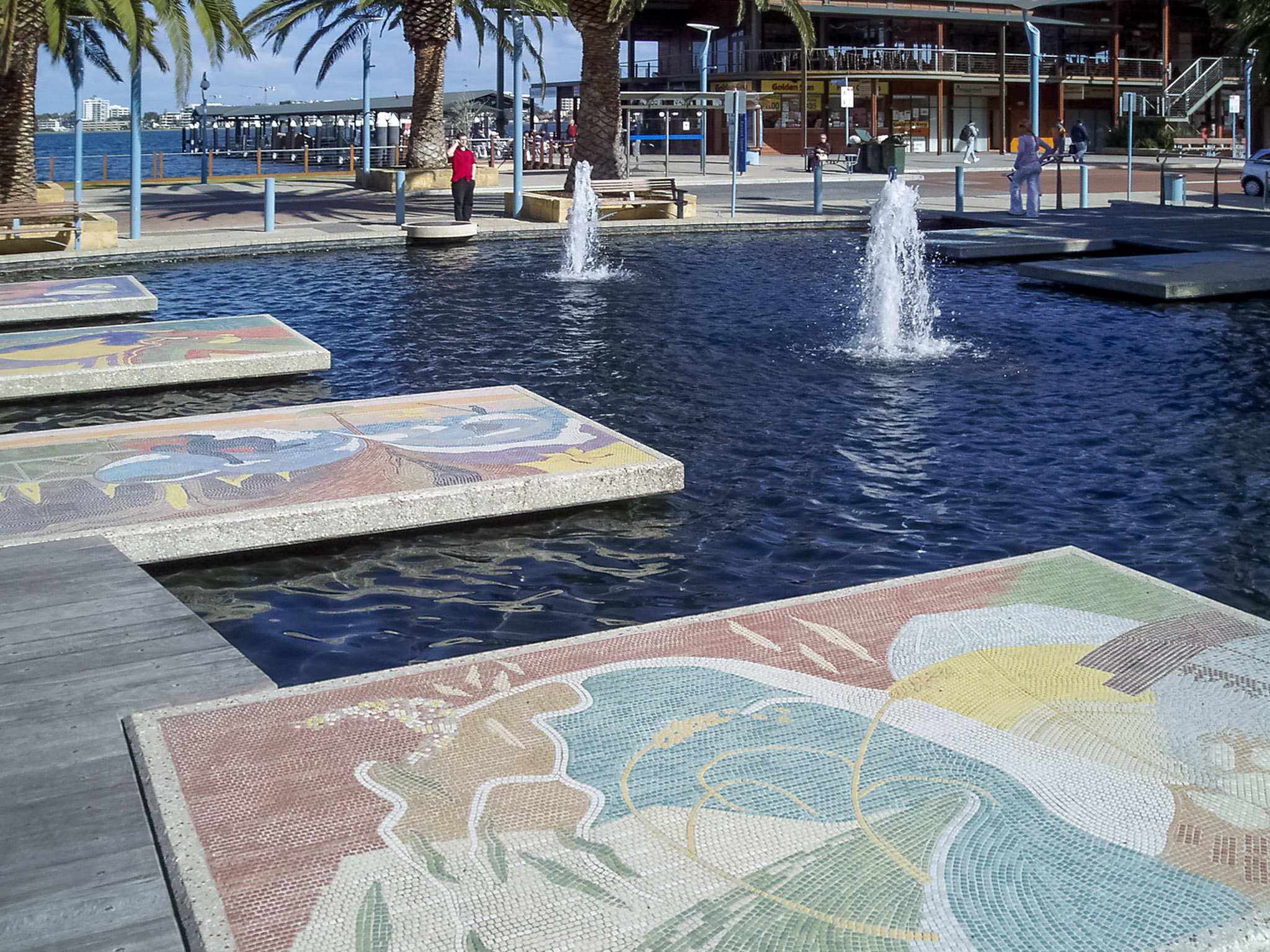
Fountains in front of Swan Bells

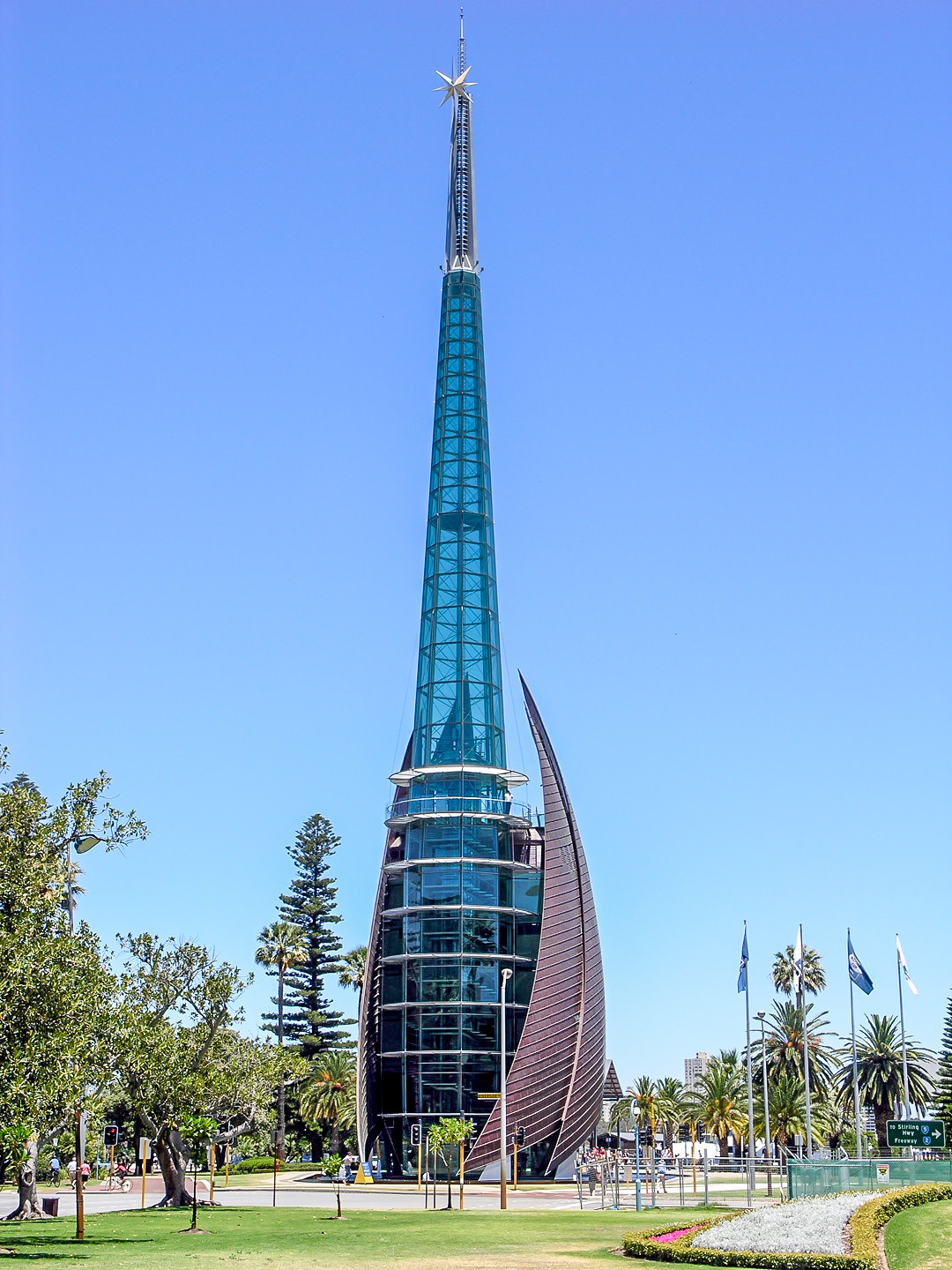

== See also ==
- The Australian and New Zealand Association of Bellringers
- The Bell Tower Times
