= Pier Street, Perth =

Road in Perth, Western Australia

Coordinates: 31.9547°S 115.86254°E

Pier Street, Perth Western Australia

General information
- Type: Street

Major junctions
- south end: St Georges Terrace
- north end: Brisbane Street

Location(s)
- Major suburbs: Perth

Pier Street is a street in the central business district of Perth, Western Australia. It runs from St Georges Terrace to Wellington Street, continuing immediately north of the railway until Brisbane Street very close to where Brisbane Street meets Bulwer Street.

The street originally continued north as far as Perth Oval. The crossing with the Armadale/Thornlie railway line (just north of Wellington Street) was a site of regular accidents before it was closed.

In the 1840s, before the northern part of Perth Water was filled in to become what is now the Supreme Court Gardens, Pier Street extended south past St Georges Terrace as far as the Swan River.

In the 1930s the northern portion, on the northern side of the railway passing through Perth, had a range of notable businesses located in the blocks between the railway and Newcastle Street. J. & E. Ledger was one such firm.

== Major intersections ==
LGA	Location	km	mi	Destinations	Notes
Vincent	Perth	0	0.0	Brisbane Street	Northern terminus of northern section
Vincent	Perth	0.45	0.28	Parry Street	Roundabout. Access to Graham Farmer Freeway eastbound
Vincent–Perth boundary	Perth	0.6	0.37	Newcastle Street – Leederville	Left-in/left-out intersection
Perth	Perth	0.8	0.50	Aberdeen Street	Roundabout
Perth	Perth	1.1	0.68	James Street	Traffic must turn to continue as intersection configured so that Pier Street curves to James Street from the north.
Perth	Perth	1.3	0.81	Moore Street – East Perth	Roundabout and terminus of northern section. Connection to Moore Street via railway crossing was closed in October 2019
Midland line, Armadale line, Airport line, Ellenbrook line		2.4– 2	1.5– 1.2	Road discontinuous at railway lines.	
Perth	Perth	0.0	0.0	Wellington Street (State Route 65) – West Perth, East Perth	Northern terminus of southern section at signalised T-junction.
Perth	Perth	0.15	0.093	Murray Street	Pier Street converts to one-way southbound at signalised intersection
Perth	Perth	0.30	0.19	Hay Street	Pier Street converts back to two-way southbound at unsignalised intersection
Perth	Perth	0.40	0.25	St Georges Terrace – Kings Park, West Perth, Subiaco, Victoria Park	Southern terminus of southern section at signalised intersection. No right turn from St Georges Terrace west to Pier Street north.
1.000 mi = 1.609 km; 1.000 km = 0.621 mi: Closed/former; Incomplete access

== Hay Street intersection ==
The intersection with Hay Street was where the Swan River Mechanics' Institute series of buildings were located on the south west corner.

- 1851 (Mechanics Hall on the front of building) – 1898
- 1901 name changed to Perth Literary Institute
- 1957 became the City of Perth Library (which moved to Council House, Perth in 1963)

Pier Street defines the eastern border of the city block known as Cathedral Square.

The Playhouse Theatre was located in Pier Street.

== St Georges Terrace intersection ==
The Deanery is located on the corner of Pier Street and St Georges Terrace.
