= Steak sandwich (Australia) =

Australian dish

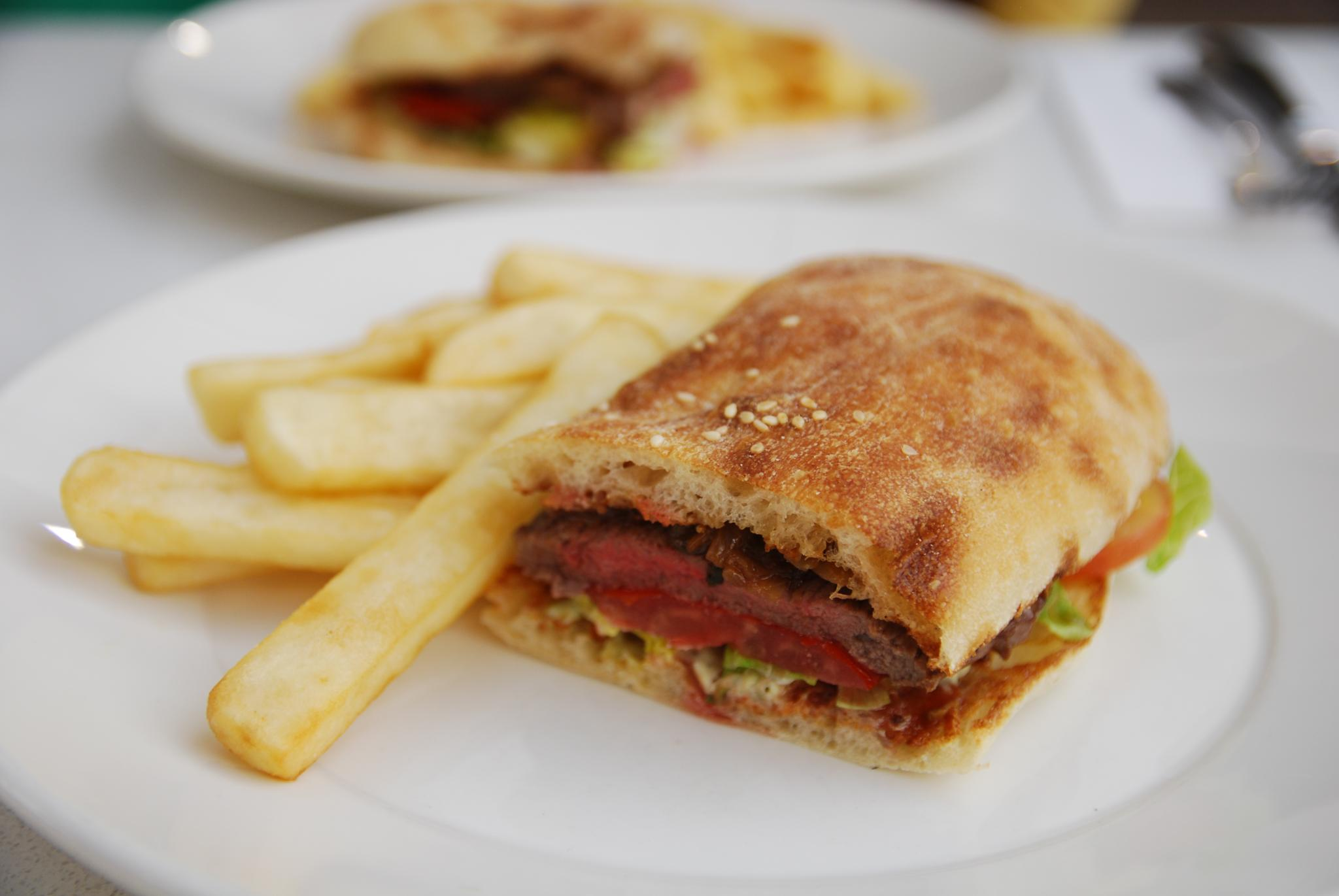
- Wagyu steak sandwich with fries, served in Melbourne, Australia
- Type: Sandwich
- Course: Main course
- Place of origin: Australia
- Region or state: Australia; (esp. Western Australia)
- Serving temperature: Hot
- Main ingredients: Steak; bread
- Similar dishes: Steak sandwich; (American cuisine)

In Australian cuisine, a steak sandwich is a dish consisting of a steak on a bun, roll, or between slices of bread, often with a variety of other ingredients. It is sometimes called a steak sanga or a steak burger.

The term steak sandwich is also known in the UK and the US, but is used for other sandwich styles featuring slices of steak or roast beef. In the US, steak burger is a marketing term used for a hamburger ostensibly made with higher quality ground beef.

== Description ==
The sandwich always includes a steak as its main filling, typically grilled or barbecued and not sliced into small pieces. Other ingredients vary, and the sandwich can be served on a bun, roll, or between slices of bread. When served on a bun, it is sometimes called a steak burger.

== Popularity ==
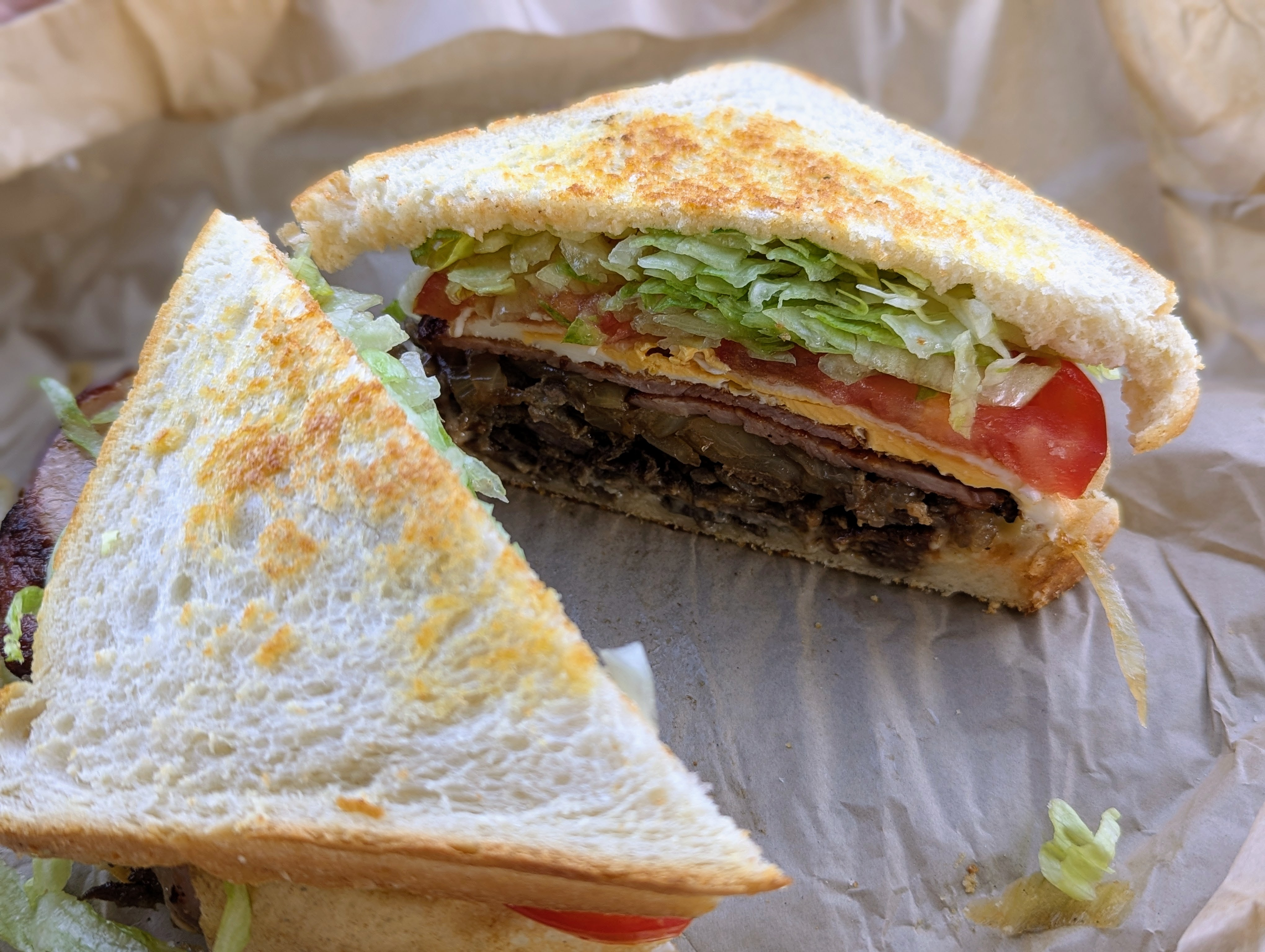
Steak sandwich from a takeaway shop

WAToday called the sandwich an "all-time classic" and "iconic".

The sandwich is known throughout the country but is particularly popular in Western Australia. The Australian Hotels Association of Western Australia has held an annual steak sandwich competition from the late 2000s. An instagrammer in Perth who reviews steak sandwiches locally and around the country has achieved a "cult following" among Perth foodies, according to Perth is Ok!

In 2009 Qantas removed its version of the sandwich from the menu for first-class passengers and reinstated it after protests from customers.

In 2025 a steak sandwich variation, steak frites mitraillete, based on the Belgian dish steak frites, was served at the Australian Open. ESPN described the sandwich as making "a giant splash".

== Similarly-named dishes ==
Steak sandwiches are known in the UK and the US. The UK versions typically consist of slices of steak on a bun. The US versions typically consist of very thinly-sliced or shaved steak cooked on a griddle or of thinly-sliced roast beef. Both types are sometimes topped with other ingredients, are served on a bun or roll, and are sometimes served with a dipping sauce.

In the US, "steak burger" is a marketing term for a hamburger that ostensibly uses higher-quality cuts of beef than in a typical American hamburger to create the patty.

== See also ==
- List of sandwiches
- Conti roll
