= St Brigid's Church, Perth =

St Brigid's Church
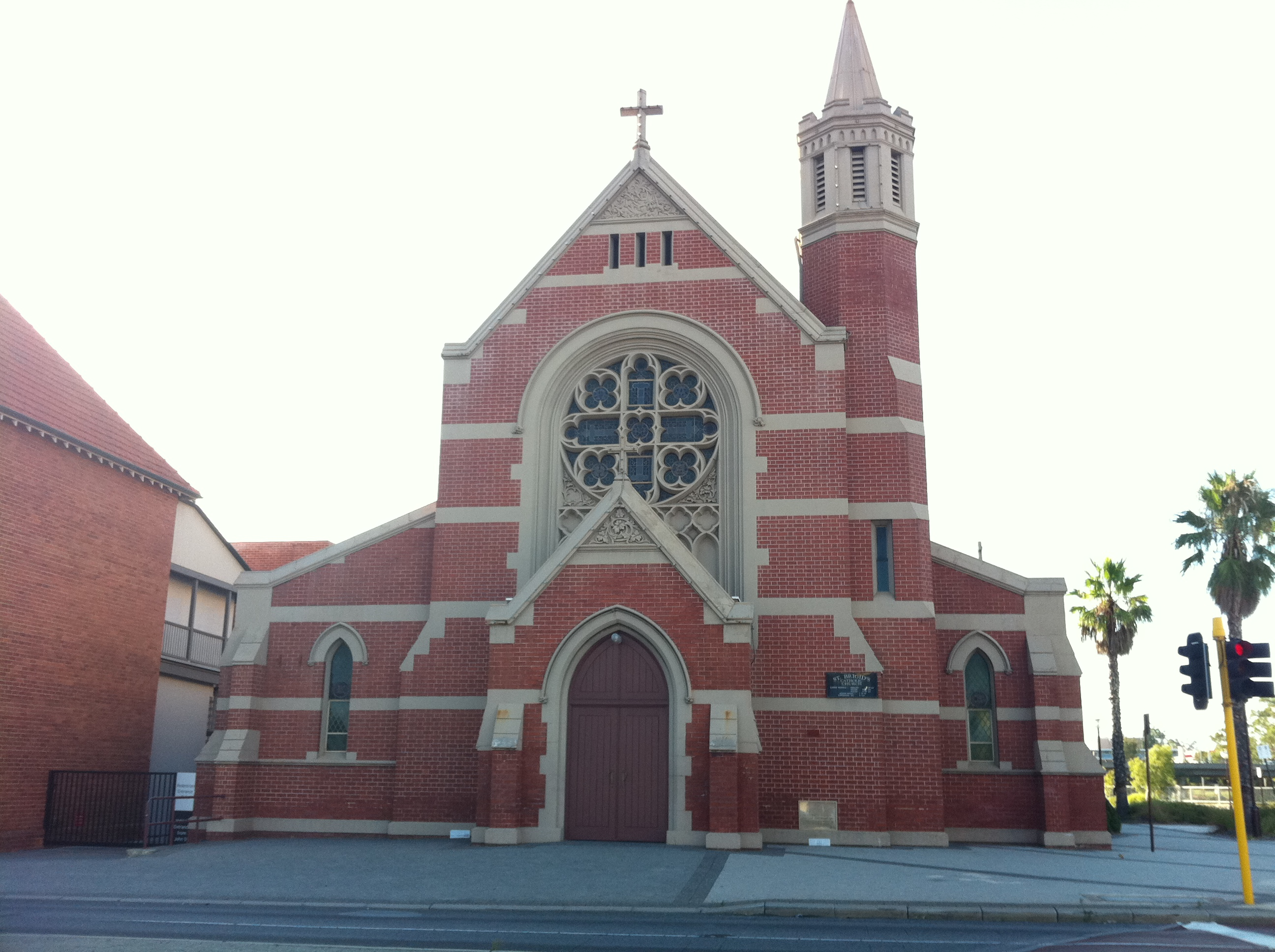
- St Brigid's Church
- St Brigid's Church
- 31°56′39″S 115°51′12″E
- Address: Aberdeen Street, Northbridge, Western Australia
- Country: Australia
- Denomination: Catholic Church

History
- Status: Church
- Founded: May 1904
- Dedication: Saint Brigid
- Consecrated: 5 February 1905

Architecture
- Architectural type: Church
- Style: Federation Gothic

Specifications
- Capacity: 700 – 800
- Length: 35 metres (115 ft)
- Width: 18 metres (60 ft)
- Height: 12 metres (40 ft)
- Materials: Red bricks; green Welsh slate; jarrah timber

Administration
- Archdiocese: Perth
- Parish: St Brigid's

Western Australia Heritage Register
- Type: State Registered Place
- Designated: 23 November 2004
- Part of: St Brigid's Group, Perth (2030)
- Reference no.: 1977

St Brigid's Church is a heritage-listed Roman Catholic church in Northbridge, Western Australia. The church precinct comprises the church building itself, a convent, a presbytery and a school, situated on a block of land bounded by Aberdeen Street (to the north-east), Fitzgerald Street (to the south-east), John Street (to the south-west) and a park and freeway exits (to the north-west).

== History ==
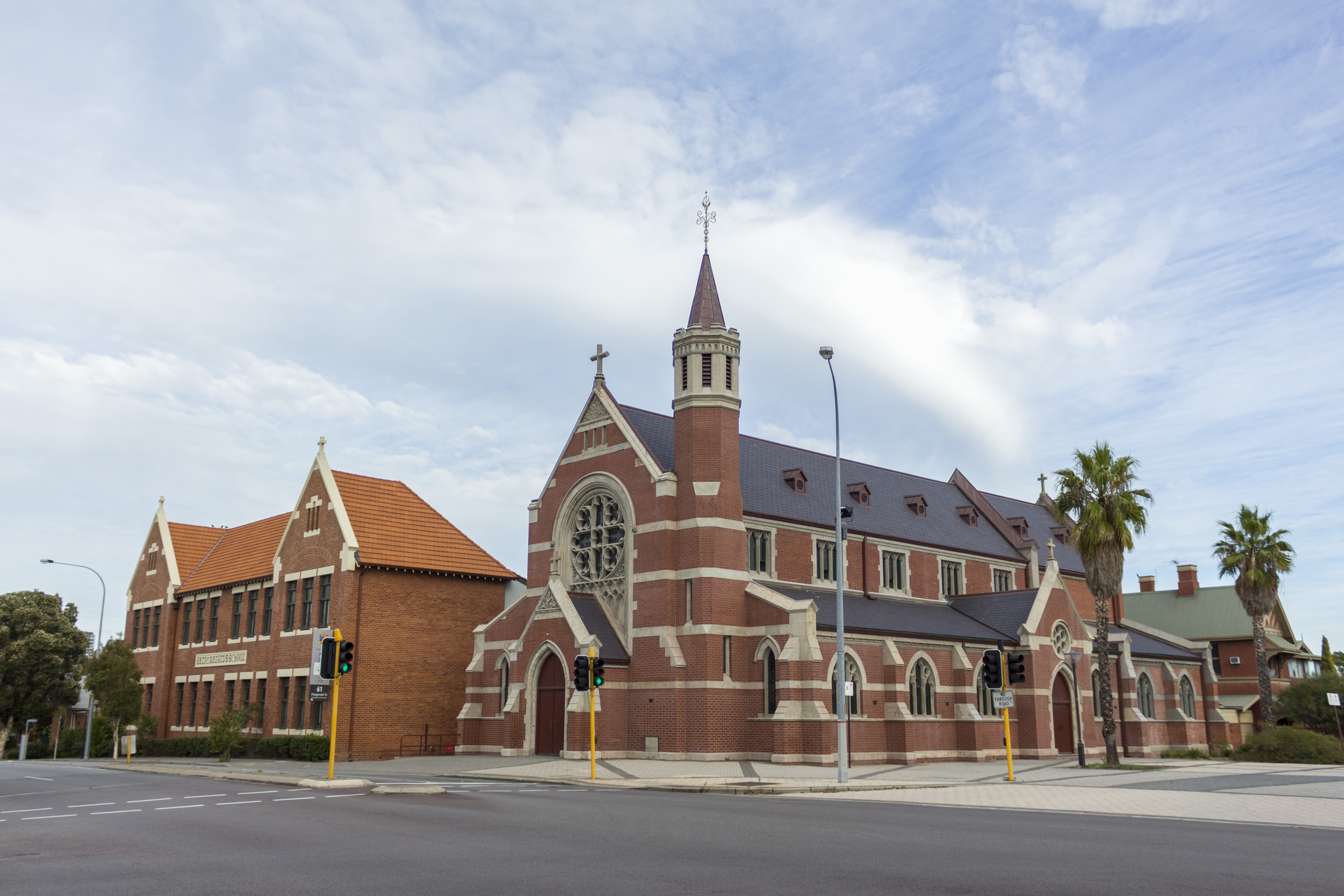
St Brigid's Church with the old St Brigid's School

On 16 July 1888, Sisters Berchmans Deane and John Evangelist Stewart of the Sisters of Mercy commenced the operation of a school in a cottage on John Street. The school (called St Brigid's) quickly attracted many pupils and, in six months, plans were underway for a larger school. On 1 February 1889 (the feast of St Brigid), Bishop Gibney laid the foundation stone for a large school building. Student numbers continued to grow, necessitating the construction of a convent chapel with accommodation for larger numbers of the Sisters of Mercy required to run the school. As the number of Sisters increased, the convent building was progressively extended. The convent building was completed in 1896.

On 25 May 1896, the convent became an independent community of the Sisters of Mercy (previously it had been affiliated with the Convent of the Immaculate Conception in Victoria Square). This allowed the convent to accept novices and postulants.

In 1901, the parish of St Brigid's was established, and Monsignor Bourke was appointed as parish priest. The nuns provided access to the school buildings for church services, but this was very inconvenient to constantly re-arrange everything, so a committee was formed in April 1901 to raise funds for the building a church and a presbytery.

In 1902, the presbytery was built facing Aberdeen Street. In February 1904, the plans had been drawn up for the church itself and the foundation stone was laid in May 1904. The church was built on the corner of Fitzgerald Street and Aberdeen Street and was officially opened on 5 February 1905.

=== Recent times ===
By 1974, the area, once residential, had become more of a commercial and industrial area. As a result, there were very few students. It was decided that the Sisters would sell the convent to the Western Australian State Government to be used by organisations such as the Department of Corrections and for Technical and Further Education (TAFE).

In 1991, the church precinct was classified by the National Trust of Australia. The State Government offered the Sisters the opportunity to buy back the convent and a community grant was used to restore the buildings. The Sisters returned to St Brigid's in 1998 and the precinct was heritage listed in 2004.

In 2011, the St Brigid's Convent is used as the Congregation administration offices of the Sisters of Mercy in West Perth. The historical records of the Sisters are kept in the cottage where the school began.

== Architecture ==
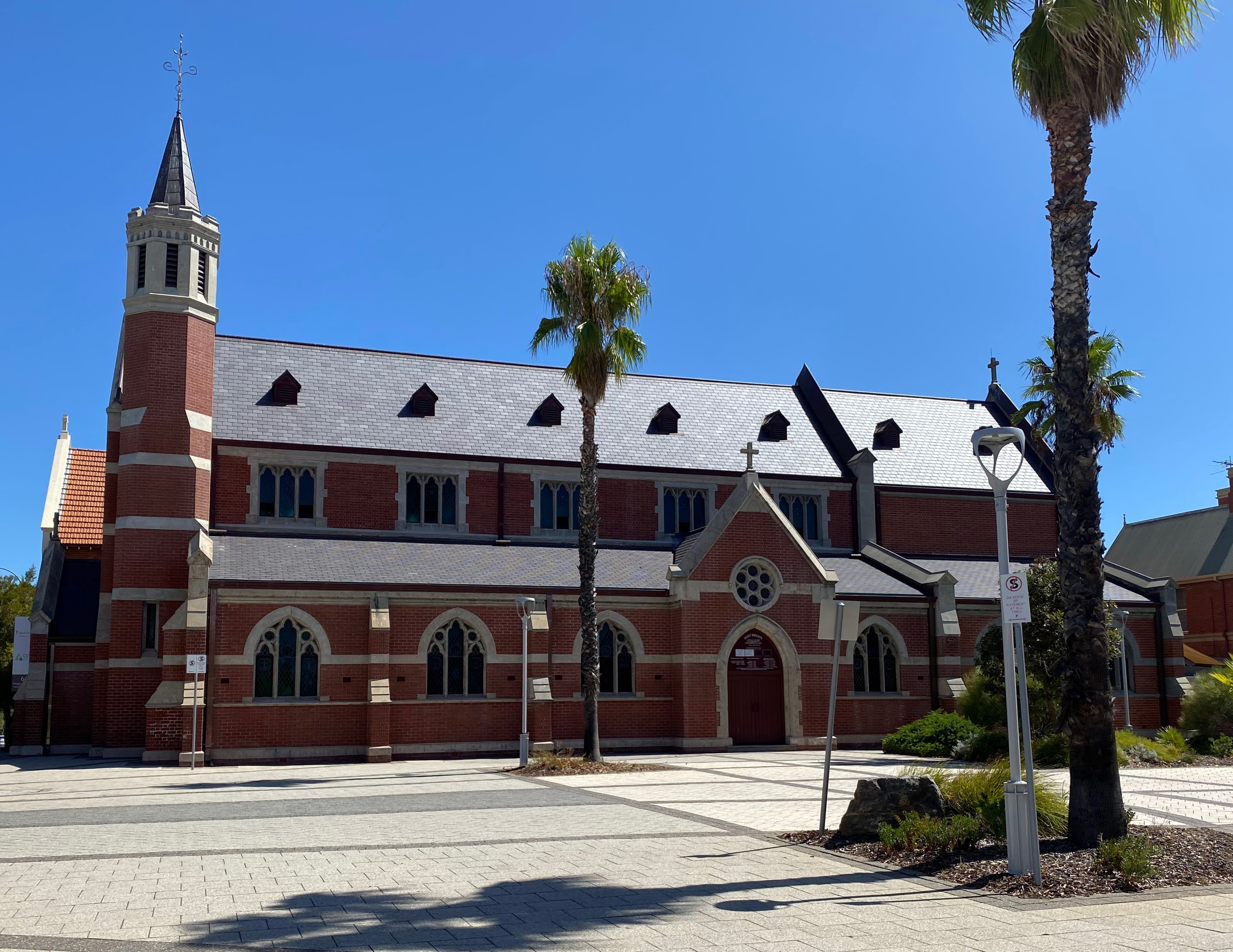
Side view of St Brigid's Church

The church is built in Federation Gothic style with walls of red brick. The church is about 18 metres (60 ft) wide and 35 metres (115 ft) long and the height to the ceiling is 12 metres (40 ft). There are three aisles, giving access to seating for 700-800 people. There is a large rose window over the main entrance on Fitzgerald Street, with another entrance on Aberdeen Street. On the corner nearest Fitzgerald and Aberdeen Streets, the stairs to the choir are extended up to a tower containing a belfry. The church bell was imported from England. The windows on the side are mullioned and traceried with the surrounds being made of freestone. The roof is made of Green Welsh slate. The furniture in the church was custom-made from solid polished jarrah timber.

The convent has an oratory and features a hammer-beamed trussed roof. The windows are painted dado and leadlight panel bay windows with gold-painted arches.

The school is a two-storey building in the Federation Arts and Craft style.
