= Aberdeen Street, Perth =

Street in Perth, Western Australia

Coordinates: 31.9472°S 115.8606°E

Aberdeen Street Western Australia
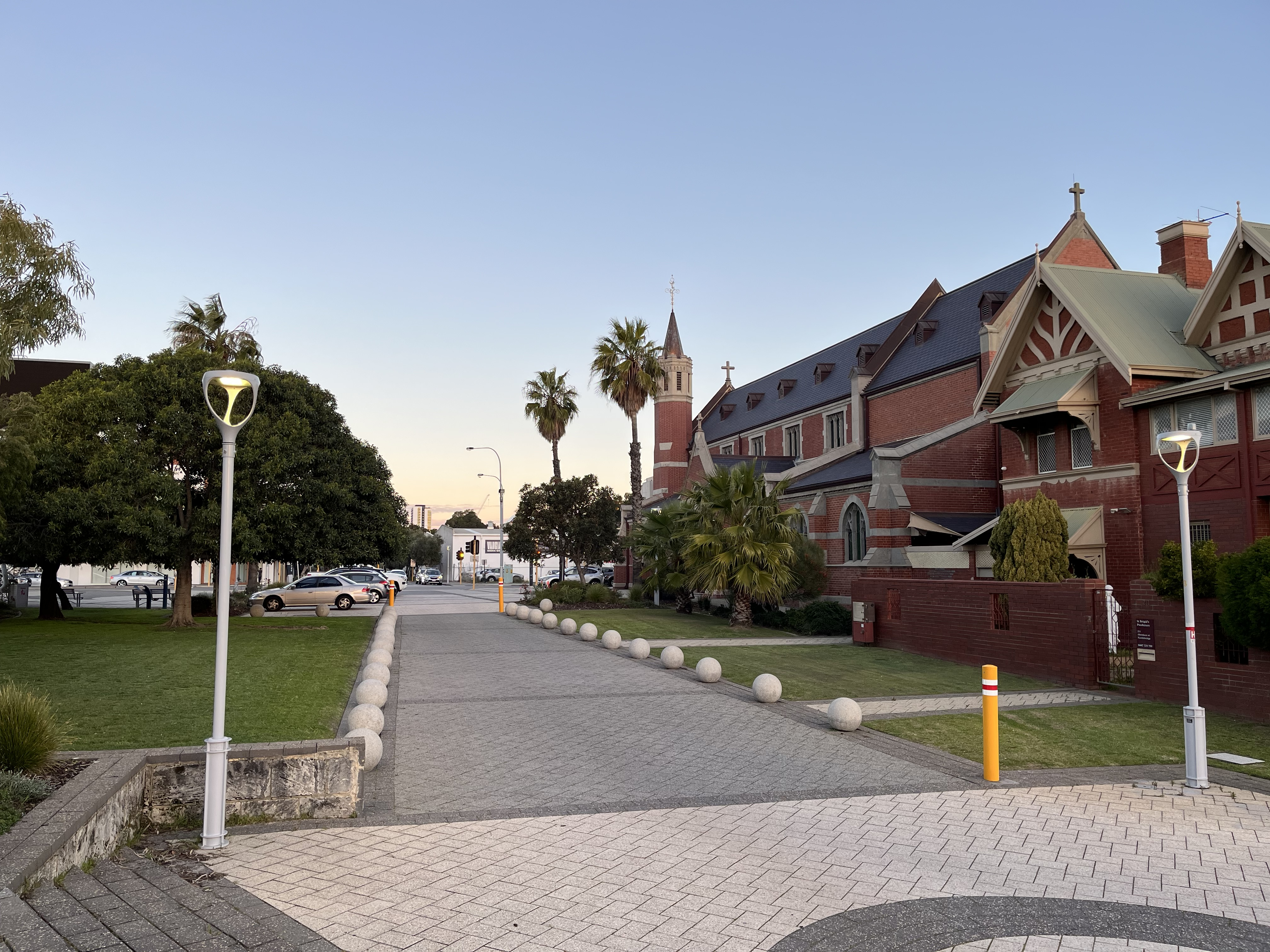
- The western end of Aberdeen Street and St Brigid's Church in November 2025

General information
- Type: Street
- Length: 1.6 km (1.0 mi)

Major junctions
- East end: Cul-de-sac west of Lord Street
- Beaufort Street (State Route 53); William Street (State Route 53); Fitzgerald Street
- West end: Cul-de-sac west of Fitzgerald Street

Location(s)
- Suburb(s): Perth, Northbridge

Aberdeen Street is a street in the Perth suburbs of Perth and Northbridge that runs from a cul-de-sac west of Lord Street in the east to a cul-de-sac between Fitzgerald Street and the Mitchell Freeway in the west. The street has 42 locally listed places of significance, 18 of which are also listed on the State Register of Heritage Places.

== Tannery ==
It had been the location of The Perth Tannery at number 257.

== History ==
Aberdeen Street was named after the Earl of Aberdeen, who was Foreign Secretary in the Duke of Wellington's Cabinet when Western Australia was founded. A separate Aberdeen Road in East Perth was shown on the first street map of Perth issued in 1838, but a later survey by John Septimus Roe of this part of the Swan River Colony had removed that thoroughfare by 1845, and the name was transferred to the present Aberdeen Street.

Aberdeen Street originally extended from Beaufort Street in the east to Charles Street in the west, after which it continued west as Duke Street (which extended west to Sutherland Street, continuing as Stone Street). By 1925, Duke Street had been incorporated into Aberdeen Street.

A bill was introduced in 1913 to extend Aberdeen Street eastward from its previous terminus at Beaufort Street to Pier Street and make it continue east as an existing street, Short Street, which ran from Pier Street to Lord Street. However, this extension was ultimately not constructed until the mid-1970s. (Note: A map in the Government Gazette of 9 June 1976 shows the roads as separate, while Landgate aerial imagery from 7 June 1977 shows the roads as being connected.)

As part of the construction of the Mitchell Freeway in the 1970s, overpass bridges were constructed over Aberdeen Street for the Charles Street freeway entry and exit ramps. (Note: Landgate aerial imagery shows no bridges in 1970, the southbound entry ramp bridge completed by 1974, and the northbound exit ramp bridge completed by 1977.) As the Mitchell Freeway reached Leederville in the late 1970s, Aberdeen Street was extended westward to Vincent Street. In the mid-2000s, this western section of Aberdeen Street was renamed to Leederville Parade. (Note: An aerial image from 2006 refers to the road as Aberdeen Street, but the March 2007 document containing the image refers to it as Leederville Parade.)

The 1999 replacement of the Lord Street level crossing with a road bridge required the severance of Short Street from Lord Street, with Short Street becoming a cul-de-sac before Lord Street. Some time after this, the entire remaining stretch of Short Street was subsumed into Aberdeen Street. (Note: The map of the planned street layout after the Lord Street bridge construction clearly labels part of a street current maps refer to as "Aberdeen Street" as "Short Street".)

Due to the construction of the Graham Farmer Freeway from 1996 to 2000, Aberdeen Street was severed into two discontinuous sections on either side of Charles Street: the eastern side terminating at a cul-de-sac in front of St Brigid's Church, just west of Fitzgerald Street; and the western side terminating at a cul-de-sac just west of the Charles Street northbound exit ramp from the Mitchell Freeway. (Note: Landgate aerial imagery shows a continuous Aberdeen Street in 1995, and the Graham Farmer Freeway severing the two halves in 2000.) West of Fitzgerald Street, the short cul-de-sac was redeveloped into Piazza Nanni, a parkland piazza, which opened on 27 June 1999.

By November 2004, the surviving Duke Street portion of Aberdeen Street had been renamed to Old Aberdeen Place.

== Intersections ==
LGA	Location	km	mi	Destinations	Notes
Perth	Perth	0	0.0	Cul-de-sac	Aberdeen Street terminus; adjacent to Lord Street
Perth	Perth	0.15	0.093	Nash Street	
Perth	Perth	0.26	0.16	Pier Street	Roundabout
Perth	Perth	0.4	0.25	Stirling Street	Traffic light controlled
Perth	Perth	0.55	0.34	Beaufort Street (State Route 53)	Traffic light controlled
Perth	Perth	0.65	0.40	Museum Street	Museum Street is one-way northbound
Perth	Perth - Northbridge boundary	0.85	0.53	William Street (State Route 53)	Traffic light controlled; no right turns from William Street onto Aberdeen Street
Perth	Northbridge	0.85	0.53	Via Torre	
Perth	Northbridge	1	0.62	Zempilas Street	
Perth	Northbridge	1.1	0.68	Lake Street	Stop sign controlled, giving Aberdeen Street priority
Perth	Northbridge	1.2	0.75	Parker Street	Stop sign controlled, giving Aberdeen Street priority
Perth	Northbridge	1.3	0.81	Palmerston Street	Stop sign controlled, giving Aberdeen Street priority
Perth	Northbridge	1.4	0.87	Shenton Street	
Perth	Northbridge	1.4	0.87	Antonas Road	
Perth	Northbridge	1.5	0.93	Churchview Alley	
Perth	Northbridge	1.6	0.99	Fitzgerald Street	Traffic light controlled; Aberdeen Street is part of Piazza Nanni west of intersection
Perth	Northbridge	1.6	0.99	Cul-de-sac	Aberdeen Street terminus; western edge of Piazza Nanni
1.000 mi = 1.609 km; 1.000 km = 0.621 mi: Incomplete access
