= List of streets in West Perth =

Most streets of West Perth, Western Australia are separate from the streets of the Perth central business district.

Name	Date built	Name source	Other name(s)	Notes	Image
Altona Street	between 1895 and 1897			Applications for mains water in Altona Street were rejected in 1886.	
Arthur Street	c 1897				
Bailey Street	c 1897		Eden Street		
Ballarat Street	c 1896	Ballarat	Clive Street	Named likely after the town of Ballarat in Victoria	
Bellevue Terrace	by 1894				
Brooking Street	by 1894	Brooking	Kings Park Road	Brooking Street (1875): After the then Deputy Surveyor-General of WA. Now called "King's Park Road." See: Kings Park Road West Perth 6005	
Campbell Street	c 1899				
Caroline Street	by 1885		Kingston Avenue	See: Kingston Avenue & Perth 6000	
Carr Street	c 1902	J.G. Carr	Carr Place	"J.G. Carr, a member of the first non-official Legislative Council of Western Australia." Local knowledge provided by a former resident states that the section between Loftus St & Newcastle St Leederville was renamed to Carr Place c1988 The Perth City Council took on responsibility for the streets in the 1890s. Some name changes were Leeder Street to Carr. By 1920 there were 120 residences listed along the full length of Carr Street.	
Charles Street	by 1845	Charles Fitzgerald		Charles Street (1853): After Captain Charles Fitzgerald, Governor of WA, 1848-55.	
Cleaver Street	by 1885	William Cleaver Francis Robinson		"Governor William Cleaver Francis Robinson was thrice Governor of Western Australia. It is amazing that his only imprint on city street names is a short thoroughfare - Robinson-avenue. What is even more amazing is the temerity which led to the bestowal of Governor Robinson's second Christian name on a West Perth street." Cleaver Street (1875) : After Sir Wm Cleaver F Robinson, four times Governor of WA, between 1875-1895. Perhaps the three-times governor had already left the State then; or it may be that as there were already a William and a Francis street and a Robinson-avenue there was no option left his admirers but to use the re-maining and distinctively individual -name of the popular governor.	
Cliff Street	c 1907		Tryphena Terrace, Cliff Terrace	According to the Western Australian Street Directories, Tryphena Terrace was originally changed to Cliff Terrace before becoming Cliff Street	
Clive Street	c 1896				
Colin Grove	c 1902			Not to be confused with either Colin Street or Colin Place	
Colin Place	c 1895		Lawrence Avenue	Location of Colin Place appears to have been moved to the northern end of Colin Street, possibly when Railway Street was built as an extension of Roe Street, and access to Railway Street from Colin Street running south was blocked off. Observations made using old survey maps compared to current maps	
Colin Street	by 1893/94	Colin Campbell		"In West Perth there are Colin, Havelock and Outram Streets which, with Delhi Square, are reminiscent of the Indian Mutiny." Colin Street: Sir Colin Campbell, of Indian Mutiny fame. "Sir Colin Campbell (1792-1863) 1st Baron Clyde, one of three Generals concerned in the Indian Mutiny who were honoured by having a street in West Perth named after them."	
Colvin Lane	2006 c 11 July	Flour Factory in Newcastle Street		"The Town's historian has suggested the ROW be named Colvin Lane. Colvin's was a self raising flour factory which was located in nearby Newcastle Street, operating from 1907 to 1934"	
Cook Street	c 1894			Cook Street: Named in 1886.	
Coolgardie Street				"Change in Street Names. The Perth City Council decided yesterday, on the recommendation of the general purposes committee, that the name of Coolgardie-street, West Perth, be changed to Marshall-street to avoid confusion with Coolgardie-terrace. East Perth, and that the name of Delhi-place, West Perth, be changed to Lucknow-place to avoid confusion with Delhi-street, West Perth.". This did not happen, as it's still Coolgardie Street and there is no Marshall Street in West Perth. Not to be confused with Coolgardie Terrace in East Perth	
Cowle Street	by 1894				
Delhi Street	c 1938	Delhi (Indian Mutiny)		Different to Delhi Square and Delhi Place. "In West Perth there are Colin, Havelock and Outram Streets which, with Delhi Square, are reminiscent of the Indian Mutiny." "Change in Street Names. The Perth City Council decided yesterday, on the recommendation of the general purposes committee, that the name of Coolgardie-street, West Perth, be changed to Marshall-street to avoid confusion with Coolgardie-terrace. East Perth, and that the name of Delhi-place, West Perth, be changed to Lucknow-place to avoid confusion with Delhi-street, West Perth."	
Delhi Place	c 1894		Lucknow Place	Different to Delhi Street and Delhi Square. "Change in Street Names. The Perth City Council decided yesterday, on the recommendation of the general purposes committee, that the name of Coolgardie-street, West Perth, be changed to Marshall-street to avoid confusion with Coolgardie-terrace. East Perth, and that the name of Delhi-place, West Perth, be changed to Lucknow-place to avoid confusion with Delhi-street, West Perth."	
Delhi Square	c 1877-78		Harold Boas Gardens	Different to Delhi Street and Delhi Place. "In West Perth there are Colin, Havelock and Outram Streets which, with Delhi Square, are reminiscent of the Indian Mutiny." "Change in Street Names. The Perth City Council decided yesterday, on the recommendation of the general purposes committee, that the name of Coolgardie-street, West Perth, be changed to Marshall-street to avoid confusion with Coolgardie-terrace. East Perth, and that the name of Delhi-place, West Perth, be changed to Lucknow-place to avoid confusion with Delhi-street, West Perth." Delhi Square: These and other Indian (Mutiny) names, were fixed by Col R T Goldsworthy, Colonial Secretary of WA in 1877-78, and who was "through" the Mutiny.	
Douglas Street	c 1897				
Douro Place	c 1894	Douro		"Honours Arthur Wellesley, 1st Duke of Wellington (1769-1852), Prime Minister of the United Kingdom (1828-30) during the foundation of the Colony in 1829. The Duke of Wellington was Marquis of Douro after the battle of the passage of the Douro River in the Peninsular War."	
Douro Street	by 1845	Douro (One of Battles)	Wellington Street (continuation)	Douro Street (1855): Now included in Wellington Street. So named from one of Wellington's battles from which he received the title "Marquis of Douro."	
Drummond Place	after 1979			Not to be confused with Drummond Street (now known as Stamford Street) in Leederville. Could likely be the former north-western end of Sutherland Street before construction of northern railway line.	
Duke Street	by 1845		Aberdeen Street (continuation)		
Dyer Street		James Dyer	N/A	Dyer Street: (surveyed 1855) was named after James Dyer, merchant of Perth. It was resumed at some stage for commercial development.	
Eden Street	1939 c 01 Feb				
Emerald [Hill] Terrace	1891		Emerald Terrace	Emerald Hill Terrace: Privately named in 1891. Extension south later - about 1904.	
Fitzroy Street					
Florence Place					
Gallop Street	c 1897	Joseph Gallop		Named after market gardener Joseph Gallop. Joseph Gallop arrived in Western Australia in 1829 with his brothers Edward and James. James is the great great grandfather of the former WA Premier Geoff Gallop. Joseph Gallop died in the 1890s and the land was passed onto his two daughters. Gallop Street, located nearby, is named after him.	
Gardner Street	c 1897		Simpson Street	Not to be confused with Gardiner Street in East Perth	
George Street	c 1863	George IV	St Georges Place	George Street is named after (probably) King George IV. Section between Hay Street and St Georges Terrace renamed St Georges Place	
Golding Street	1886	Golding Family		Golding Street: Named 1886 after Golding family, owners of the sub-division.	
Gordon Street					
Hammond Street	c 1896				
Harvest Terrace	between 1868 and 1894	Harvest		"Among other streets which Dr Battye said were named after English and Colonial public men were Aberdeen, Newcastle, Brisbane, Bulwer (Bulwer-Lyton), Moore, Short, Hill, Irwin, Hutt and Milligan Streets and Harvest Terrace." "Harvest Terrace was named after Colonel Harvest, who was Commandant from 1872 to 1878." Harvest Terrace (1874): After Colonel E D Harvest, Commandant of WA Military Forces. (Ag Governor, 1877.)	
Harwood Place	c 1897				
Havelock Street	by 1879	Henry Havelock	Delhi Street, Sutherland Street	"In West Perth there are Colin, Havelock and Outram Streets which, with Delhi Square, are reminiscent of the Indian Mutiny." "(1795-1857), one of three Generals concerned in the Indian Mutiny who were honoured by having a street in West Perth named after them. Havelock was noted for his recapture of Kanpur from rebels during the Indian rebellion of 1857." Havelock Street: After General Sir Henry Havelock, of Indian Mutiny fame, 1877 (see Delhi Square). Section between Wellington Street and Railway street slightly modified and renamed Delhi Street (continuation). Section between Railway Street and Sutherland Street	
Hay Street	1829 Aug-Sep	Robert William Hay		(Originally it was named Hay Street only between Havelock and Barrack Streets) Robert William Hay (1786-1861), Under Secretary of the State for War and the Colonies, 1829 when the colony of Western Australia was founded.	
Hooper Street	1886			Hooper Street: Named 1886. Possibly now the western end of Murray Street. Still called in Hooper in 1959. In 1937 Murray Street was pushed through from Havelock to Outstram Streets, the westernmost extension to Thomas (from Outram) still being Hooper.	
Ivy Street	c 1898				
Jacksonia Path					
Janet Street	c 1920				
Kings Park Road	1901			King's Park Road: Because next is King's Park; formerly Brooking Street, which see. (See Brooking Street.) See: Brooking Street, West Perth and Kings Park 6005, & Perth 6000 and Northbridge 6003 Not to be confused with Kings Park Avenue in Crawley	
Kingston Avenue	c 1904			See: Caroline Street, West Perth and Kings Park 6005, & Perth 6000 and Northbridge 6003	
Kulunga Grove					
Lawley Street	c 1927				
Lawrence Avenue	c 1930				
Leeder Street	by 1894	Wm John Leeder,	Carr Street	Named after Wm John Leeder, original grantee of major portion of (now) Leederville site. Now part of Carr Street. See: Carr Street	
Leederville Parade				Formerly part of Aberdeen Street, specifically, the "western end".	
Loftus Street					
Lucknow Place	c 1939		Delhi-place	"Change in Street Names. The Perth City Council decided yesterday, on the recommendation of the general purposes committee, that the name of Coolgardie-street, West Perth, be changed to Marshall-street to avoid confusion with Coolgardie-terrace. East Perth, and that the name of Delhi-place, West Perth, be changed to Lucknow-place to avoid confusion with Delhi-street, West Perth."	
Macvean Lane	after 1979				
Malcolm Street	abt 1874	Malcolm Fraser		"(Kings Park): Sir Malcolm Fraser (1834-1900). He replaced John Septimus Roe as Surveyor-General of Western Australia in 1870. Later Commissioner of Lands then the first Agent-General for Western Australia in London." Malcolm Street (about 1874): After (Sir) Malcolm Fraser, Commissioner of Lands in Old Government.	
Market Place	c 1933	Sutherland Street		It is likely that it was renamed to Sutherland Street (continuation) Not to be confused with Market Street which runs parallel to Roe Street	
Market Street	after 1949 and by 1978	Market gardens, City markets		Possibly named after the original Market gardens and then the city markets which were upgraded to make way for the Watertown shopping centre and private office space/parking lots. Not to be confused with Market Place which used to run north off Wellington Street to the railway, and continued north as Sutherland Street from there	
Mayfair Street					
Mitchell Freeway	1973 Nov				
Mount Street	by 1938				
Murray Street	1829 Aug-Sep	George Murray		"(originally only between Havelock and Barrack Streets) Sir George Murray (1772-1846), Secretary of State for War and the Colonies during the foundation of Western Australia. He was briefly in Canada from December 1814 to May 1815 where he was appointed provisional Lieutenant-Governor of Upper Canada and reviewed the defences of Canada." Sir George Murray, Secretary of State for War and Colonies at the time the colony was founded. "It was to his decision that the foundation of the colony was actually due." "Murray Street also used to be divided at Barrack Street, that part of it west of the dividing line being called after Sir George Murray, a general and statesman, who was a member of Parliament for Perth in Scotland from 1823, and Secretary of State for the Colonies from 1828 to 1830." Mall: Paved, pedestrian only, commercial precinct that links Barrack and William Streets. Murray Street (1838): After Geo Murray, Secretary of State for the Colonies 1828-30.	
Ord Street	by 1894	Harry Ord		"Major-General Sir Harry St. George Ord (1819-95) was Governor of Western Australia from 1878 to 1880. He was also the Governor of the Straits Settlements from April 1, 1867 till November 4, 1873." Ord Street: After Major-General Sir H St Geo Ord, Governor of WA 1877-80.	
Outram Street	1899 22 Feb	James Outram		"In West Perth there are Colin, Havelock and Outram Streets which, with Delhi Square, are reminiscent of the Indian Mutiny." Outram Street: After General Sir Jas Outram, of Indian Mutiny fame (see Delhi Square), 1877. (About 1880.) "Sir James Outram 1803-1863), one of three Generals concerned in the Indian Mutiny who were honoured by having a street in West Perth named after them."	
Parkes Street			Delhi Street		
Parliament Place	1925 14 May	Parliament House		It was renamed after Parliament House after its construction.(Most likely)	
Pine Street	c 1895		Colin Grove		
Plaistowe Mews					
Princes Street	by 1845		George Street	See: Perth 6000 and Northbridge 6003	
Prospect Place					
Prowse Street					
Railway Parade					
Railway Street				Nearby railway line	
Rheola Street	by 1838				
Richardson Street					
Russ Lane					
Simpson Street	by 1838				
Strathcona Street					
Sutherland Street		Henry Charles Sutherland		"Henry Charles Sutherland, Assistant Surveyor to John Septimus Roe." Named after the former Lake Sutherland.	
Tandy Street					
Thelma Street					
Thomas Street		James Thomas		The road is named after James Thomas, the Director of Public Works 1876 to 1884	
Trevarton Street	by 1894		Loftus Street (continuation to Thomas Street)	Appears on an 1894 map of Perth marked in red, but is crossed out and replaced with Loftus	
Troode Street					
Tryphena Terrace	c 1895/96		Cliff Terrace, Cliff Street		
Ventnor Avenue	by 1838				
Victoria Street	by 1838				
Vincent Street		George Vincent		The street is believed to have been named by the chief draughtsman in the Lands Department, George Vincent, after himself in about 1876. Vincent was the recipient of the land on the north side of the street, east of Charles Street, in the first Crown grant of Perth. The local government area City of Vincent was named after the street (on which the city council chambers are located). Vincent Street is believed to be named after George Vincent, the Chief Draughtsman in the Lands Department and original grantee of land on the north side, east from Charles Street. He named it after himself on issue of the first Crown Grant of Perth c.1876.	
Violet Street					
Walker Avenue					
Wellington Place					
Wellington Street	by 1836	Arthur Wellesley		"Arthur Wellesley, 1st Duke of Wellington (1769-1852), Prime Minister of the United Kingdom (1828-30) during the foundation of the Colony in 1829."	
West Street					
Wilson Street			Parliament Place		

== See also ==
- List of streets in Perth
- List of streets in East Perth
- List of streets and paths in Kings Park
- List of streets in Crawley and Nedlands
- List of streets in Bayswater, Western Australia
- List of streets in Kardinya, Western Australia
