= List of streets in Perth =

The suburbs of Perth and Northbridge were combined until 1982 when Northbridge was established as a separate suburb.

== Streets starting with A or B ==
Name	Suburb	Date built	Name source	Other name(s)	Notes	Image
Aberdeen Road	Perth	By 1838	George Hamilton-Gordon, 4th Earl of Aberdeen		The Aberdeen of Aberdeen Street was that Earl of Aberdeen who was Foreign Secretary in the Duke of Wellington's Cabinet when Western Australia was founded...His name first appeared in Aberdeen-road, East Perth, where it can be seen on the first street map of Perth issued in 1838; but a later survey by Roe of this part of the town wiped out that thoroughfare, and his name was transferred to the present Aberdeen-street running off Beaufort-street.	
Aberdeen Street, Perth	Perth, Northbridge (Fitzgerald to William Street)	August–September 1829	George Hamilton-Gordon, 4th Earl of Aberdeen	Duke Street, Lamb Street, Short Street	The Aberdeen of Aberdeen Street was that Earl of Aberdeen who was Foreign Secretary in the Duke of Wellington's Cabinet when Western Australia was founded.	
Adelaide Terrace	Perth, East Perth	1830	Queen Adelaide		Named after Queen Adelaide, "the ruling sovereign" at the time of Perth's founding. The wife of King William IV.	
Amy Street	Perth	after 1855				
Antonas Road	Northbridge	after 1979				
Aria Lane	Perth, Highgate	after 1855				
Astone Lane	Perth	2006	Antonino Astone		"During that time, being more significant, Mr Astone held the first license to transport passengers to and from the Fremantle Port. Mr Astone transported hundreds of migrants and brought them to settle within the Northbridge area. During the 1950s, Mr Astone made a significant contribution to the local community through his work as the owner of a taxi fleet, fruit and vegetable vendor, and a crockery business where he established a vast network of Northbridge restaurant clients. His crockery business continued for 26 years. My father was a well known figure within the Northbridge community, who resided at 135 Bulwer Street for over 40 years. The cohort of students from that time (Highgate Primary School) remember Mr Astone as the 'Man with the red truck'."	
Baker Avenue	Perth		Henry Baker - City Baker		Henry Baker was a carrier...Mr Baker investigated in several properties. Hence, Baker Avenue remains alongside Birdwood Square between Bulwer Street and Brisbane Street. Soon, he was making bread in the more literal sense and for the next 60 years his horse-drawn baker's carts were making home deliveries of bread to the Highgate area, bearing the legend H. Baker, City Baker.	
Barclay Street	Perth	1893		Now Elder Street		
Barrack Square	Perth	1905-1907	Barrack Street		Part of the Barrack Street Jetty precinct, Bell Tower Precinct, and the present day Elizabeth Quay. "The so called “Barrack-street Square” is really a series of squares intersected by drives and footpaths."	
Barrack Street	Perth	1829	Barracks, 63rd regiment		The Barracks that gave Barrack-street its name were those first military Barracks which were built along the alignment of Barrack-street in 1829 for the soldiers of the 63rd regiment.	
Bay Street	Perth	By 1838		Now Erskine Link	Bay Street ran down to a small bay near the Causeway, at the end of the town.	
Bazaar Street	Perth	By 1833	Houses on the Bazaar and other streets	Bazaar Terrace, now The Esplanade	In the early days of the settlement this waterfront road between William Street and Mill Street was an important commercial focus with port facilities including several jetties adjoining. It is now approximately where Mounts Bay Road is today and set well back from the foreshore. It had a prominent limestone wall and promenade built using material quarried from Mount Eliza.	
Beaufort Street	Perth	By 1834	Henry Somerset or possibly Francis Beaufort		Beaufort, of Beaufort-street, was that Rear-Admiral Sir Francis Beaufort, K.C.B., who, in 1829, the year in which Western Australia was founded, went to the Admiralty as hydrographer (or chief map-maker) to the Royal Navy and remained there mapping the seas of the world and their hidden dangers for the succeeding 26 years. He was looked up to with veneration by Surveyor-General Roe who sent his name down to posterity not only in Beaufort-street and Francis-street nearby, but also in Mount Beaufort.	
Braid Street	Perth					
Brewer Street	Perth, East Perth	1903				
Bridge Street	Perth					
Brisbane Place	Perth	circa 1897	Sir Thomas Brisbane			
Brisbane Street	Perth	August–September 1829	Sir Thomas Brisbane	Padbury Street	Named after Sir Thomas Brisbane, Governor of NSW. East of Beaufort Street was once called Padbury Street. "Among other streets which Dr Battye said were named after English and Colonial public men were Aberdeen, Newcastle, Brisbane, Bulwer (Bulwer-Lyton), Moore, Short, Hill, Irwin, Hutt and Milligan Streets and Harvest Terrace."	
Brisbane Terrace	Perth	circa 1897	Sir Thomas Brisbane			
Brook Street	Perth	By 22 June 1845	Claise Brook			
Brooking Street	West Perth	By 1894	John Sherlock Brooking	Now Kings Park Road		
Brookman Street	Perth	c 1890s	William Brookman		Named after two of the principal investors in the company who had made fortunes in the gold boom; William Brookman and Herbert Moir of London.	
Broome Road	Subiaco, Perth	By 1894	Frederick Napier Broome	Now Hay Street, Perth	"Hay-street, too, perpetuates the name of a pioneer, and though its prolongation from East Perth to Subiaco meant obliteration of two other pioneer names - Howick and Broome - by which formerly the eastern and western ends respectively were known, it is preferable to continuing three names for one continuous thoroughfare...By-and-bye came Governor Broome and Broome-road, Subiaco (since ab-sorbed into Hay-street)- and the only remaining reminder in the city of the name Broome is a hotel!"	
Bulwer Avenue	Perth	22 February 1899	Edward Bulwer-Lytton			
Bulwer Street	Perth	August–September 1829	Edward Bulwer-Lytton		One of the Main streets here in Perth, runs next to Hyde Park on its south side. Bulwer Street was named after Sir Edward Bulwer Lytton, the novelist, who was Secretary of State for the Colonies 1858-59.	
Bunbury Bridge	Perth	1893		Now Goongoongup Bridge	Now known as Goongoongup Bridge in East Perth. The original timber bridge was built just over a century ago as part of the Perth to Pinjarra rail link and was rebuilt in 1932 after being damaged by floods.	
Bury Street	Perth, East Perth	circa 1895				

== Streets starting with C or D ==
Name	Suburb	Date built	Name source	Other name(s)	Notes	Image
Cantle Street	Perth, Highgate	circa 1897				
Carr Street	Perth, West Perth	circa 1902	Julian George Charles Carr	Formerly known as Leeder Street, Now Carr Place	After J. G. C. Carr, merchant of Perth. (His business was on site of A.M.P. Buildings.) Also Chairman of Perth City Council, about 1872.	
Cathedral Avenue	Perth	After 1855 and by 1882	St. Georges Cathedral		Sometimes shown as St. George's Avenue...Cathedral Avenue operates as an access route to both the Treasury Buildings and to the Cathedral for formal functions.	
Caroline Street	Perth, West Perth	By 1885		Now Kingston Avenue		
Causeway Bridge	Perth, East Perth	By 1845		Now The Causeway	Dual carriageway road traffic bridge that connects Perth and East Perth to the Canning Highway, Great Eastern Highway, Shepperton Road and Albany Highway. In 1839, a dam is constructed across the Swan River between the Perth shore and Heirrison Islands, and being a dam rather than a bridge, it became known as the Causeway. The name was retained for subsequent bridges built here, the first joining of the shores of the Swan River here with a bridge, occurring in 1843. This bridge remained in use until 1947. The post-war baby boom and increased immigration brought rapid growth to Australia's towns and cities, and growth in the number of vehicles and traffic increased greatly. Governments across Australia pursued road construction with great vigour, and it was at this time that the present Causeway was built and the boundaries of Heirrison Island were clearly defined with the building of the island's seawalls.	
Caversham Street	Perth					
Chapman Street	Perth					
Charles Street	Perth, West Perth, North Perth	By 1845	Charles Fitzgerald		Charles Street was named after Captain Charles Fitzgerald, Governor of WA, 1848-55. The section of Charles Street from Carr Street to Walcott Street was originally an extension of Wanneroo Road.	
Cheriton Street	Perth, Highgate					
Chung Wah Lane	Northbridge	After 1979				
Church Row	Perth	After 1979				
Church Street	Perth	circa 1934				
Churchview Alley	Northbridge	After 1979				
Claisebrook Road/Street	Perth	circa 1857	Frederick Clause		Named by Captain James Stirling after Surgeon Frederick Clause (Anglicized Claise) of H.M.S. Success, who accompanied Stirling on his exploration of the Swan River. Was known as Bridge Street in 1838, because of a bridge across a creek tributary to ClaiseBrook.	
Clarendon Street	Perth	By circa 1845			Resumed to extend Fitzgerald Street before circa 1984	
Cleaver Street	Perth, West Perth	By 1885	William Cleaver Francis Robinson	Smith Street, Fennell Street	Governor William Cleaver Francis Robinson was thrice Governor of Western Australia. It is amazing that his only imprint on city street names is a short thoroughfare - Robinson-avenue. What is even more amazing is the temerity which led to the bestowal of Governor Robinson's second Christian name on a West Perth street.	
Cliff Street	Perth, West Perth	circa 1907		Tryphena Terrace, Cliff Terrace	Tryphena Terrace was originally changed to Cliff Terrace before becoming Cliff Street.	
Clifton Street	Perth, Mount Lawley/North Perth	circa 1896	Robert Cecil Clifton	Now a continuation of William Street	Clifton Street was named after R C Clifton, Under Secretary for Lands	
Coolgardie Terrace	Perth, Highgate/East Perth	circa 1895			Most likely named after the WA mining town of Coolgardie	
Dalmeny Street	Perth	circa 1895				
Dangan Street	Perth	By 1895				
Davies Street	Northbridge	After 1979				
Duchess Way	Perth	2016	The Duchess (Ferry)		The Duchess was the most famous ferry to cross the Swan River transporting passengers from Barrack Street Jetty to South Perth from 1898 to 1927.	
Duke Street	Perth	circa 1857			Became a continuation of Aberdeen Street circa 1921.	
Dyer Street	Perth, West Perth	circa 1859	James Dyer, merchant of Perth		Originally between Havelock and the intersection of Roe and Charles Streets, and appears to have been shortened to Sutherland Street by 1978, and later to Marquis (Market) Street by 1979, before being resumed for buildings. Currently the City West Lotteries House and the Environmental Defender's Office buildings.	

== Streets starting with E or F ==
Name	Suburb	Date built	Name source	Other name(s)	Notes	Image
East Parade	Perth, East Perth	c 1899				
Edward Street	Perth	By 22 June 1845	Sir William Edward Parry or Sir Edward Bulwer Lytton		Probably named after Sir Wm Edward Parry. (The late Registrar-General says named after Sir Edward Bulwer Lytton, but the former is the more probable.)	
Elder Street	Perth		Sir Thomas Elder	Formerly Barclay Street	Named after Sir Thomas Elder of South Australia, organiser of the first commercial shipment of camels and their handlers to Australia (1865-1866). Also the benefactor of Ernest Giles' explorations (1873-1874)	
Ellen Street	Perth	By 22 June 1845	Lady Ellen Stirling	Now Newcastle Street	The central portion of what is now Newcastle-street (between Beaufort and Lake streets), was, until comparatively recent years, known, as Ellen-street, so named in compliment to Captain Roe's wife	
Elovalis Lane	Perth	c 2006				
Enchantress Way	Perth	2016	Enchantress (steam boat)		The paddle steam boat, Enchantress, was built in Perth in 1875 and was a popular passenger ferry.	
Errichetti Place	Perth, Northbridge	After 1979				
Fennell Street	Perth	1897				
Ferdinand Street	Perth	By September 1859		Now Winthrop Avenue		
Fitzgerald Street	Perth, Northbridge	By 1855	Captain Charles Fitzgerald		"No name, however, was suggested for the street, but as we believe that each Governor of this colony has had some street in our metropolis named after him, it is but fair to assume that the street in question will be called after Captain FitzGerald"	
Fore Street	Perth	After 1855				
Forbes Road/Street	Perth	circa 1899	Colonel Forbes		Named after Colonel Forbes, of Commissariat, 1877	
Forbes Lane	Perth	circa 1930				
Forrest Avenue	Perth	1855	Sir John Forrest (late Lord Forrest)	Cemetery Road	John Forrest it to be remembered for all time in Forrest-place (a belated tribute, it is true), Forrest-avenue (East Perth) and Forrest Park (one of the "breathing spaces" of the city). These areas he so consistently advocated and so generously contributed to by the dedication of our glorious King's Park.	
Forrest Place	Perth	circa 1923	Sir John Forrest (late Lord Forrest	Central Arcade	Forrest Place, named after Lord Forrest, after the completion of the new GPO.	
Francis Street	Perth	By 22 June 1845	Sir Francis Beaufort		Named after Rear-Admiral Sir Francis Beaufort, K.C.B., who, in 1829, the year in which Western Australia was founded, went to the Admiralty as hydrographer (or chief map-maker) to the Royal Navy and remained there mapping the seas of the world and their hidden dangers for the succeeding 26 years. He was looked up to with veneration by Surveyor-General Roe who sent his name down to posterity not only in Beaufort-street and Francis-street nearby, but also in Mount Beaufort.	

== Streets starting with G or H ==
Name	Suburb	Date built	Name source	Other name(s)	Notes	Image
Geoffrey Bolton Avenue	Perth	29 January 2016	Professor Geoffrey Bolton		In acknowledgement of the contribution made by Emeritus Professor Geoffrey Bolton AO to conserve, record and teach the history of Western Australia. Professor Bolton is recognised as one of Australia's foremost historians, socio-political commentators and historical writers, and was WA's nominee for Australian of the Year in 2006.	
Glendower Street	Perth	1896				
Goderich Street	Perth	1829	Frederick John Robinson (Viscount Goderich)	Murray Street, Twiss Street	Named after Viscount Goderich, 1830 (formerly Frederick John Robinson), Prime Minister, 1827–28, and Secretary of State for the Colonies, 1830–33). Originally extended east from Barrack Street.	
Good Street	Perth	circa 1899	Fred Good	Now a continuation of Pier Street	Probably named after Mr Fred Good, timber merchant, with Mr E G Lacey	
Graham Farmer Freeway	Perth, Northbridge	April 2000	Graham "Polly" Farmer		Named after Graham (Polly) Farmer, a local football legend.	
Grigoroff Street	Northbridge	After 1979				
Guildford Road	Perth	By 22 June 1845	Northbridge		Appears listed as "Road to Guildford" on the original 1838 map, but only appears to be an unofficial track, not an actual street	
Hardinge Street	Perth	By 1845	Sir Henry Hardinge	Now James Street	Named after Sir Henry Hardinge (afterwards Viscount), of Sikh War fame, and later Governor General of India. Was War Secretary, 1828. (Now part of James Street.)	
Hay Street	Perth	1829	Robert William Hay	Broome Road, Howick Street	One of the few roads that extends outside City of Perth boundaries. It goes to the edge of Floreat through to two more Local Government areas. Hay Street is a major road through the CBD of Perth, Western Australia, and adjacent suburbs. The street was named after Robert William Hay, the Permanent Under Secretary for Colonies. Sections of the road were once called Howick Street (west of Barrack Street) and Broome Road (east of Thomas Street). One block in the central CBD section is now a pedestrian mall with extremely limited vehicular traffic, so it is necessary to make a significant detour to drive the entire length of Hay Street.	
Hill Street	Perth, East Perth	August–September 1829	Lord Rowland Hill		Named after General Lord Hill who was Commander-in-Chief of the Army when on 29 November 1829 Sir George Murray, Secretary for the Colonies, informed him that "it was His Majesty's wish that a detachment of 60 rank and file, with a proper proportion of officers and non-commissioned officers, be held in readiness for embarkation for the Western Coast of New Holland where His Majesty's Government judge it advisable to establish a British settlement.	
Howard Street	Perth	circa 1900	Edward George Fitzalan Howard		Named after Edward George Fitzalan Howard (1818-1883), 1st Lord Howard of Glossop, a British politician.	
Howick Street	Perth	August–September 1829	Charles Grey (Viscount Howick)	Now Hay Street	East of Barrack Street, the main street used to be Howick Street, named after Charles Grey, Viscount Howick, afterwards Earl Grey under whom the Reform Bill of 1832 was carried...The names Lamb, Ellen, Mangles, Howick and others disappeared when the Perth City Council revised the street names in 1897.	
Hoy Poy Street	Northbridge, Perth	2007	Edie Hoy Poy		In 2007 a street in Northbridge (quite close to the Chung Wah Association) was named Hoy Poy Street as a recognition Edie's contribution and help towards the Northbridge area and its people.	
Hutt Street	Perth	September 1840	John Hutt	Now William Street	In the mid-1880s Hutt Street remained on the periphery of the town centre with few substantial buildings, and expansion of the area was slow. The Gold Boom and increased migration to the area however changed this, and by the late 1880s intensive commercial and residential development of the area had begun. A mix of commercial and entertainment uses proliferated, with a number of trade and community organisations also having their origins in the area around this time. Hutt Street was one of the many Perth Streets that grew rapidly during this period. The name recalls John Hutt, 1839-1846, the second Governor of Western Australia. The name was not used after 1897.	

== Streets starting with I or J ==
Name	Suburb	Date built	Name source	Other name(s)	Notes	Image
Irwin Street	Perth	August–September 1829	Colonel Frederick Chidley Irwin		Irwin Street recalls Lieutenant-Colonel Frederick Chidley Irwin (1788-1860), Commander of the 63rd Regiment aboard HMS Sulphur. He was second in command to Governor Stirling. Irwin was acting Governor of Western Australia from 1847 to 1848.	
James Street	Perth, Northbridge	August–September 1829	Sir James Stirling	Hardinge Street	James Street had to be taken in conjunction with Stirling Street, which was called after Sir James Stirling, the first Governor of WA.	
John Street	Perth, Northbridge		John Hutt	Francis Street	Named after John Hutt (1839-1846) the second Governor of Western Australia 1839-46	

== Streets starting with K or L ==
Name	Suburb	Date built	Name source	Other name(s)	Notes	Image
Kakulas Crescent	Northbridge	After 1979				
Kensington Lane	Perth, East Perth				Now where the Perth City Link project is.	
Kensington Street	Perth, East Perth	circa 1898		Suburban Road		
King Street	Perth		King George IV or King William IV		It has not been 100% confirmed which monarch the street is actually named after, as some sources say King George IV, and some say King George's successor, King William IV	
Lacey Street	Perth	circa 1899	Edmund Gilyard Lacey		Named after E G Lacey, sawmill owner and timber merchant, about 1903.	
Lake Street	Perth, Northbridge	By 22 June 1845	Named because it ran between First Swamp and Lake Kingsford		Lake Street originally stopped at Lake Kingsford, named after a pioneer settler, Samuel Kingsford, whose farm was nearby. By 1839, Lake Kingsford had been filled in and the stream channeled underground. Lake Street now stopped at Aberdeen Street, then called Lamb Street. Melbourne Road then linked Lake Street with Murray Street.	
Lamb Street	Perth	By 22 June 1845	William Lamb	Now Aberdeen Street	Named after William Lamb, one of the early colonists, who owned land in that district and also in Fremantle. ..."The names Lamb, Ellen, Mangles, Howick and others disappeared when the Perth City Council revised the street names in 1897."	
Leadlight Lane	Perth	After 1979				
Leeder Street	Perth	By 1894	William John Leeder	Now Carr Street	Named after Wm John Leeder, original grantee of major portion of (now) Leederville site.	
Limbo Street	Perth	By 22 June 1845	Named for its vicinity to the jail site	Now Museum Street	"The site selected for the structure is on an activity between Hutt street and a street marked on the map with the inauspicious name of Limbo street, which, as its name implies, is in the vicinity of the gaol."	
Lincoln Street	Perth, Highgate	circa 1865	Abraham Lincoln		Named after the American President at the time, Abraham Lincoln. He came into prominence in 1858, and hence supposition.	
Lindsay Street	Perth, Highgate	circa 1897				
Little Shenton Lane	Northbridge	After 1979				
Lipfert Street	Perth	After 1984				
Lord Street	Perth	by 1838	Frederick John Robinson, Lord Goderich	A section between Goderich Street and Riverside Drive has now been renamed Victoria Avenue.	Named after Frederick John Robinson, the Prime minister in 1827-1828 and Secretary for War and the Colonies from 1830 to 1833 was created Viscount Goderich in 1827. Hence the names Lord and Goderich.	

== Streets starting with M or N ==
Name	Suburb	Date built	Name source	Other name(s)	Notes	Image
Mackie Street	Perth	By 1828				
Mangles Street	Perth	By 22 June 1845		Now Newcastle Street		
Marquis Street	Perth	By 1855				
Melbourne Street	Northbridge	By 1838	William Lamb, 2nd Viscount Melbourne	Milligan Street (1923-2017)		
Michael Close	Northbridge	After 1979				
Mill Street	Perth	August–September 1829				
Milligan Street	Perth	August–September 1829	William Lane Milligan			
Mitchell Freeway	Perth	November 1973	James Mitchell			
Moir Street	Perth	c 1890s	Herbert Moir		Named after two of the principal investors in the company who had made fortunes in the gold boom; William Brookman and Herbert Moir of London.	
Monger Street	Perth	22 February 1899	John Henry Monger			
Money Street	Perth, Northbridge	circa 1894	C.A. Money			
Moore Street	Perth	August–September 1829				
Morgan Street	Perth	By 1838		Morgan's Road, now Mounts Bay Road		
Mountain Terrace	Perth, Northbridge	circa 1895	George Fletcher Moore			
Mounts Bay Road	Perth	By 1845				
Murray Street	Perth	August–September 1829	George Murray			
Museum Street	Perth	26 July 1897	Museum & Art Gallery			
Narrows Bridge					Built as the bridge between the Kwinana & Mitchell Freeways.	
Nash Street	Perth	By 22 June 1845	Richard West Nash			
Nelson Terrace	Perth	By 22 June 1845		Nelson Crescent, Nelson Avenue		
Newcastle Street	Perth	August–September 1829	Henry Pelham Clinton	Mangles Street, Ellen Street		
Nicks Lane	Northbridge	After 1979				
Nile Street	Perth	By 1845				

== Streets starting with O or P ==
Name	Suburb	Date built	Name source	Other name(s)	Notes	Image
Ophir Walk	Perth		Royal Ophir Pleasure Boat Company			
Oriental Lane	Perth	29 January 2016	After 1979			
Padbury Street	Northbridge					
Palmerston Street	Perth, Northbridge	1876	Lord Palmerston			
Parker Street	Perth, Northbridge	By 1894	Henry Parker			
Parry Street	Perth	By 22 June 1845				
Pendal Lane	Perth	10 September 2002				
Perth-Fremantle Road	Perth	circa 1846		Now Stirling Highway		
Pier Street	Perth	By 1838				
Plain Street	Perth, East Perth					
Princes Street	Perth			Now George Street		
Prizmic Lane	Northbridge	After 1979				

== Streets starting with Q or R ==
Name	Suburb	Date built	Name source	Other name(s)	Notes	Image
Quarry Road	Perth	By 1859			Now a section of Mounts Bay Road	
Queen Street	Perth	circa 1894				
Re Loop	Northbridge	After 1979				
Riverside Drive	Perth					
Robinson Avenue	Perth	circa 1894	William Cleaver Francis Robinson			
Robinson Road	Perth	By 1894	William Cleaver Francis Robinson		Former extension of Trafalgar Road	
Roe Street	Northbridge, West Perth	August–September 1829	John Septimus Roe			

== Streets starting with S or T ==
Name	Suburb	Date built	Name source	Other name(s)	Notes	Image
Samson Street	Perth					
Serich Lane	Northbridge	After 1979				
Shenton Street	Perth, Northbridge	By 1893	George Shenton			
Sherwood Court	Perth	18 July 1936				
Short Street	Perth	August–September 1829	Augustus Short			
Small Street	Perth	By 22 June 1845			No longer existent	
Smith Street	Perth, Highgate	1901				
Spring Street	Perth	By 22 June 1845				
St Georges Terrace	Perth	August–September 1829	St. George			
Stirling Highway	Perth	26 March 1932	James Stirling	Formerly Perth-Fremantle Road		
Stirling Street	Perth					
Stokes Street	Perth					
Suburban Road	Perth	By 1845				
Summers Street	Perth	1876				
Sutherland Street	Perth		Henry Charles Sutherland		Created when West Perth was made. Created as one of the few linking roads to Northbridge, northern suburbs and the Freeway.	
Terrace Road				Terrace Drive		
The Esplanade				Formerly Bazaar Terrace		
Thomas Street	West Perth	1870s				
Tiverton Street	Perth	circa 1895				
Trafalgar Road	East Perth, Perth		Trafalgar Square	Trafalgar Street		

== Streets starting with V ==
Name	Suburb	Date built	Name source	Other name(s)	Notes	Image
Valdura Place	Perth	29 January 2016	MV Valdura (ferry)			
Victoria Avenue	Perth	circa 1904	Queen Victoria			
Victoria Square	Perth	By 1845	Queen Victoria			
Via Torre	Northbridge	After 1979				
Vita Loop	Northbridge	After 1979				
Vincent Street	Perth		Francis Vincent			

== Streets starting with W, X, Y or Z ==
Name	Suburb	Date built	Name source	Other name(s)	Notes	Image
Wanneroo Road	Perth	By 1894		Now Charles Street	Coincides with the establishment of North Perth as a suburb.	
Washing Lane	Perth	After 1979				
Water Street	Perth	By 1838		Now Royal Street		
Wellington Street	Perth	By 1836	Arthur Wellesley		One of the main north south arteries linking Perth to Mount Lawley and Walcott Street	
William Street	Perth	By 1838	King William IV			
Wilson Street	Perth, West Perth	circa 1912	Frank Wilson	Now Parliament Place		
Windan Bridge	East Perth	22 April 2000				
Winthrop Avenue	Crawley, Nedlands, West Perth	9 May 1932	John Winthrop Hackett			
Wittenoom Street	Perth, East Perth					
Zempilas Road	Northbridge	After 1979				
Zephyr Place	Perth	29 January 2016	Zephyr (Ferry)			

== See also ==
- List of streets in East Perth
- List of streets and paths in Kings Park
- List of streets in West Perth
- List of streets in Crawley and Nedlands
- List of streets in Bayswater, Western Australia
- List of streets in Kardinya, Western Australia
