= List of streets in East Perth =

The suburb name was being used unofficially from at least the 1880s, but East Perth wasn't officially approved as a bounded suburb until 1954.

Name	Date built	Name source	Other name(s)	Notes	Image
Adelaide Terrace					
Arden Street	c1837				
Bakery Lane					
Bay Street	by 22 June 1845		Erskine	"Bay Street ran down to a small bay near the Causeway, at the end of the town."	
Beacon Terrace					
Bennett Street				"There is no information on record concerning Bennett Street." "Maiden name of Matilda Roe, wife of the first Surveyor General of Western Australia." Matilda Roe (née Bennett) 1808-1870. Married John Septimus Roe on 8 January 1829 and came straight to...() Bennett Street (1838): After Mrs J S Roe (J S Roe was the first Surveyor-General of WA). Her maiden name was Matilda Bennett.	
Bishops Row					
Boans Lane					
Bramall Street					
Bremer Promenade					
Bridge Street					
Bronte Street	1899 22 Feb	Horatio Nelson		"Admiral Lord Horatio Nelson. Duke of Bronte, famous Commander in Chief of the Royal Navy (1803-1805)." Bronte Street (1845): After Lord Nelson, Duke of Bronte.	
Brook Street	c1845	Along Claise Brook			
Brown Street	by 22 June 1845	Peter Nicholas Brown		"Peter Nicholas Brown, Colonial Secretary of Western Australia (1829-1846) and original grantee of land in the area." [Wasn't he Broun?] Brown Street (1838): After Peter Brown, Col. Secretary of WA, 1836, and original grantee of Locn A1 near extension of street east in about 1913.	
Bunbury Crescent	c1838				
Burt Way					
The Causeway				East off Riverside Drive across Heirisson Island / West onto Riverside Drive from Heirisson Island 20180226cb See: Causeway Bridge Perth 6000 20180312cb	
City Farm Place	c1838				
Clotilde Street					
Constitution Street					
Coolgardie Terrace					
De Vlamingh Avenue					
East Parade					
Eastbrook Terrace					
Ensign Lane					
Erskine Link				See: Bay Street Perth 6000 and Northbridge 6003	
Fielder Street					
Flagstaff Lane					
Forrest Avenue					
Gardiner Street		James Gardiner		Gardiner Street, East Perth named after Honourable James Gardiner (12 June 1861 – 27 October 1928) was an Australian politician who served in the Legislative Assembly of Western Australia from 1901 to 1904 and from 1914 to 1921. He served as colonial treasurer under two premiers, Walter James and Henry Lefroy. Gardiner was also the inaugural state leader of the Country Party from 1914 to 1915, and briefly served as Speaker of the Legislative Assembly from March to June 1917.r Not to be confused with Gardner Street in West Perth, which is now known as Simpson Street	
Gibraltar Way					
Glyde Street					
Goderich Street	1829 Aug-Sep	Frederick John Robinson		"Frederick John Robinson, who was created Viscount Goderich in 1827." "...the names of Goderich and Lord Streets in East Perth ...Frederick John Robinson, the Prime Minister in 1827-1828 and Secretary for War and the Colonies from 1830 to 1833 was created Viscount Goderich in 1827. Hence the names Lord and Goderich."	
Goongoongup Bridge	1995 24 July			Perth's city 3 road bridge over the river. Was originally only a rail bridge for suburban non electric passenger single track services prior to the 1990s. Present day bridge now has the dual carriageway Graeme Farmer Freeway and the electrified dual track Perth-Armadale/Thornlie suburban commuter train (). "The original Bunbury Bridge (right) was a single line timber railway bridge which took the railway line across the Swan River at East Perth near where Claise Brook enters the river. It was built as part of the Armadale line, which was opened to traffic on 2nd May 1889. The original stations were Perth, Kelmscott and Armadale. Cannington and Welshpool opened later in 1897 and 1898 respectively. The bridge was named Bunbury Bridge because the line was to be extended to Bunbury in the state's south-west, which occurred in 1891. The present double track concrete structure called the Goongoonup Bridge was constructed and brought into operation in September 1991 when Perth's suburban railway lines were electrified. It replaced its aging predecessor, ending the days of 'crossing delays' forever. The latter was demolished at the beginning of 1996." (7 - To Be Confirmed)	
Graham Farmer Freeway	2000 April	Graham (Polly) Farmer			
Haig Park Circle					
Hale Street	c 1875	Matthew Blagden Hale		"Bishop Matthew Blagden Hale, appointed first Anglican Bishop of Western Australia in 1857."	
Hay Street	c1836	Robert William Hay	Twiss Street		
Henry Street					
Henry Lawson Walk					
Hill Street	1829 Aug-Sep	Rowland Hill		Hill Street (1838): After Lord Rowland Hill, Commander-in-Chief of Imperial Forces, England, 1825-36.	
Horatio Street	by 22 June 1845	Horatio Nelson		"Lord Admiral Horatio Nelson, 1st Viscount Nelson (1758-1805)." Horatio Street: After Lord Horatio Nelson.	
Jewell Lane					
Joel Terrace					
Kensington Street					
King Street	by 1893	P P King	Royal Street	King Street (1845): Named after Captain P P King, RN; near Wickham and Stokes streets, fellow navigator with King. Now part of Royal Street. This is not central Perth's King Street.	
Leahy Walk					
Lime Street					
Little Brown Street					
Little Saunders Street					
Lord Street					
Macey Street	Before 1905			"connection of Trafalgar- Road and Macey-street, £7".	
Maggs Lane					
Meadow Street					
Mine Lane					
Moore Street	before 1838	George Fletcher Moore		Moore Street (1838): After Geo Fletcher Moore, Advocate-General of WA, 1830-46.	
Moreau Parade					
Mulberry Way					
Nelson Avenue		Horatio Nelson		"Lord Admiral Horatio Nelson, 1st Viscount Nelson (1758-1805)."	
Nelson Crescent		Horatio Nelson		Nelson Crescent (1845): After Lord Nelson.	
Nile Street	by 22 June 1845	The Battle of the Nile		"The Battle of the Nile, a famous battle of the Napoleonic Wars (1st and 2nd August, 1798) in which Lord Nelson led the British to victory. It was known in France as the Battle of Aboukir Bay. The original Nile Street was closed and included in Gloucester Park trotting grounds. The name, however, was transferred to Premier Street, the latter name being cancelled." Nile Street (1845): Named after Nelson's Battle. Original street closed and its site granted in trotting grounds. Name now transferred to Premier Street, latter name being eliminated.	
Norbert Street	c1838				
Old Belvidere Promenade					
Old Buthers Lane					
Orange Avenue		Orange Grove		Orange Avenue: Because through an old orange grove, 1896. Was part of "Gallop's Garden." In 1885 Mr Gallop was granted four acres fronting Lake Street as compensation for resumption of part of his allotment W1 to round off corner of Beaufort and Wellington streets, and eliminate an awkward break in continuity of Barrack Street.	
Orchard Way					
Plain Street	by 22 June 1845			"Origin unknown."	
Polar Street					
Premier Lane					
Regal Place					
Renaissance Avenue					
Riverside Drive				Splits in two running east parallel with Adelaide Terrace and north/west over Adelaide Terrace 2080226cb	
Royal Street			Water Street	"Origin unknown."	
Saunders Street					
Sovereign Close					
Stokes Way					
Summers Street	c1838				
Terrace Road					
Trafalgar Road	by 22 June 1845	The Battle of Trafalgar		"The Battle of Trafalgar (21 October 1805) in the Napoleonic Wars in which Lord Nelson lost his life."	
Trinity Avenue		Trinity College Originally terminating eastern end of Hay Street. Renamed Trinity Avenue in 1991 after Catholic school established on the road in 1962 . Trinity was originally named CBC St George’s Terrace at 1 St George’s Terrace . Relocated and renamed in 1962.			
Tully Road					
Twiss Street	1829 Aug-Sep	Horace Twiss	Hay Street	Running east from Bennett Street. No longer existent "Hay Street took a twist at Bennett Street and was named Twiss Street after Horace Twiss, Parliamentary Under-Secretary of State for the Colonies." "...(now Hay Street from Bennett Street to the Causeway). Horace Twiss (1787-1849), English writer and politician, Under Secretary of State for War and the Colonies 1830-1833. He took a great part in establishing the colony and was a personal friend of Governor Stirling."	
Vanguard Terrace					
Victory Terrace					
Waterloo Street	1829 Aug-Sep	The Battle of Waterloo		"Wellington Street was named after the famous general and Waterloo Street served as a reminder of the great battle he fought." "Waterloo Street, which ran off at an angle from the east end of Wellington Street. These names were appropriately chosen, as the foundation of the Colony took place during the Duke of Wellington's Prime Ministership". "The Battle of Waterloo, Belgium (18 June 1815) in which Napoleon Bonaparte was defeated by the British under Arthur Wellesley, 1st Duke of Wellington (1769-1852)."	
Waterloo Crescent	c1838			Runs east off Wellington Street 20180226cb	
Wellington Street	c1836	Duke of Wellington		"Wellington Street was named after the famous general and Waterloo Street served as a reminder of the great battle he fought."	
Westralia Street	c1838				
Wickham Place					
Wickham Street	1899 22 Feb	John Clements Wickham		"John Clements Wickham (1798-1864). He was captain of HMS Beagle (the vessel occupied by Charles Darwin during his voyage of discovery) and conducted various maritime expeditions and scientific surveys along the Australian coastline during 1837-41. He was the first Government Resident at the Moreton Bay area of Brisbane, Queensland, where he was police magistrate from 1843." It is possible the article citing the construction of this street is merely the laying of concrete or "macadam" as it does not explicitly state that the street did not already exist prior to this. See reference #117	
Windan Bridge	2000 22 April		Named after a wife of Yellagonga chief of the Mooro tribe.		
Wittenoom Street	by 22 June 1845	John Burdett Wittenoom		"Wittenoom-street, East Perth, perpetuates the name of one pioneer, the Rev J B Wittenoom."	
Zebina Street					

== See also ==
- List of streets in Perth
- List of streets and paths in Kings Park
- List of streets in West Perth
- List of streets in Crawley and Nedlands
- List of streets in Bayswater, Western Australia
- List of streets in Kardinya, Western Australia
