= List of streets in Crawley and Nedlands =

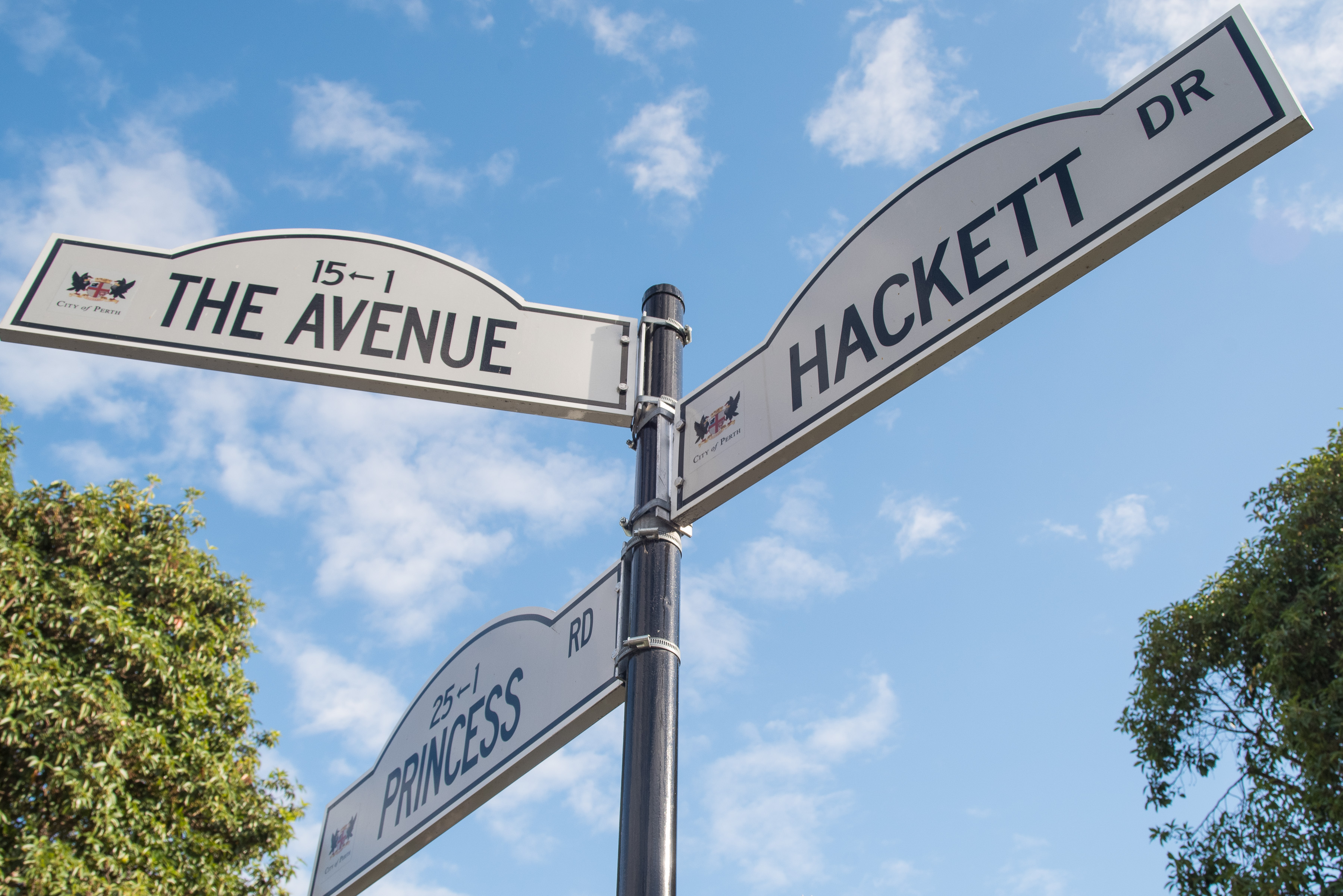
City of Perth street signs in Nedlands

This article details how the names of the streets in Crawley and Nedlands, Western Australia evolved along with the variations in use. The streets are within the City of Perth boundaries, which was amended in 2016 to include the University of Western Australia and Kings Park.

Name	Suburb	Date built	Name source	Other names	Note	Image
Aberdare Road	Nedlands/Shenton Park (boundary-partial)		Henry Bruce, 1st Baron Aberdare		Aberdare Road is shown on O.P. Perth 18/25 in 1883. Henry Austin Bruce, 1st Baron Aberdare, was Home Secretary (1868–1873), created Baron Aberdare in 1873.	
Archdeacon Street	Nedlands					
Australia II Drive	Crawley	By 1838	Australia II			
Baird Avenue	Nedlands					
Barcoo Avenue	Nedlands	1897	SS Barcoo		Part of property developer Peet & Co's Prinsep Vale Estate, streets were named after Australasian United Steam Navigation Company's merchant vessels serving WA ports at the time	
Bay Road	Nedlands/Claremont (boundary-partial)					
Bedford Street	Nedlands		Admiral Sir Frederick George Denham Bedford, Governor of Western Australia			
Bessell Avenue	Nedlands					
Betty Street	Nedlands					
Birdwood Parade	Nedlands					
Blumann Lane	Nedlands					
Boronia Ave	Nedlands					
Bostock Road	Nedlands					
Broadway	Nedlands/Crawley (boundary)	by 1838			A broad way constructed by the Claremont Road Board to take trams and traffic from the old Perth – Fremantle Road to the Nedlands Baths, Nedlands Park Hotel and Nedlands Jetty in 1907.	
Broome Street	Nedlands		Sir Frederick Napier Broome, Governor of Western Australia			
Bruce Street	Nedlands					
Bulimba Road	Nedlands	1897	SS Bulimba		Part of property developer Peet & Co's Prinsep Vale Estate, streets were named after Australasian United Steam Navigation Company's merchant vessels serving WA ports at the time	
Burwood Street	Nedlands					
Campsie Street	Nedlands					
Carrington Street	Nedlands/Karrakata (boundary-partial)		Charles Wynn-Carington, 1st Marquess of Lincolnshire, Governor of New South Wales			
Caporn Street	Crawley					
Clark Street	Nedlands/Crawley					
Clifton Street	Nedlands					
Cook Street	Crawley					
Cooper Street	Nedlands/Crawley					
Crawley Avenue	Crawley		Anna Crawley			
Crossleigh Court	Nedlands					
Croydon Street	Nedlands					
Dalkeith Road	Nedlands/Karrakatta/Dalkeith					
Doonan Road	Nedlands					
Drosera Lane	Nedlands					
Edward Street	Nedlands/Crawley					
Edward Bruce Foreshore Path	Nedlands/Crawley					
Elizabeth Street	Nedlands					
Esplanade	Nedlands					
Everett Street	Crawley					
Fairway	Crawley					
Ferdinand Road/Street	Crawley			Now Winthrop Street circa 1917		
Florence Road	Nedlands					
Fraseriana Lane	Nedlands					
Gairdner Drive	Nedlands					
Gallop Road	Nedlands/Dalkeith					
Gordon Street	Nedlands					
Government Road(.1)	Crawley			Now Crawley Avenue		
Government Road(.2)	Nedlands/Karrakatta					
Government Road(.3)	Formerly Nedlands, now Swanbourne after rezoning			Now Narla Road in 2018		
Granby Crescent	Nedlands					
Hackett Drive	Crawley		Winthrop Hackett			
Hampden Lane	Nedlands		John Hampden		John Hampden was an English patriot (1594 to 1653). Road extended from Subiaco.	
Hampden Road	Nedlands/Crawley		John Hampden			
Hardy Road	Nedlands					
Hibbertia Lane	Nedlands					
Hillway	Nedlands					
Hospital Avenue	Nedlands					
Jenkins Avenue	Nedlands					
Kanimbla Road	Nedlands					
Karella Street						
Kingston Street	Nedlands					
Kings Park Avenue					Not to be confused with Kings Park Road in West Perth.	
Kingsway	Nedlands				Originally Highway, but renamed in 1960's to avoid confusion with Stirling Highway	
Kinninmont Avenue	Nedlands					
Kitchener Street	Nedlands					
Langham Street	Nedlands					
Laxum Lane	Nedlands					
Leopold Street	Nedlands					
Leura Street	Nedlands	By 1838				
Loch Street	Nedlands/Claremont		Henry Loch, 1st Baron Loch, Governor of Victoria			
Loftus Street	Nedlands		Lord Augustus Loftus, Governor of New South Wales			
Loneragan Street	Nedlands					
Louise Street	Nedlands					
Lupin Hill Grove	Nedlands					
Marita Road	Nedlands	1897	SS Marita		Part of property developer Peet & Co's Prinsep Vale Estate, streets were named after Australasian United Steam Navigation Company's merchant vessels serving WA ports at the time	
Martin Avenue	Nedlands					
Mattner Lane	Nedlands					
Megalong Street	Nedlands					
Melvista Avenue	Nedlands/Dalkeith					
Meriwa Street	Nedlands					
Micrantha Lane	Nedlands					
Monash Avenue	Nedlands		Sir John Monash			
Mountjoy Road	Nedlands					
Mounts Bay Road	Crawley					
Myers Street	Crawley					
Napier Street	Nedlands		Sir Frederick Napier Broome, Governor of Western Australia			
Narla Road	Formerly Nedlands, Swanbourne after rezoning			Formerly Government Road(.3)		
Ord Street	Nedlands		Sir Harry St George Ord, Governor of Western Australia			
Park Avenue	Crawley					
Park Road	Nedlands/Crawley					
Parkway	Crawley					
Poole Avenue	Nedlands	By 1838				
Portland Street	Nedlands					
Princess Road	Nedlands/Crawley	By 1838				
Quadrangle Point	Nedlands					
Robinson Street	Nedlands		Sir William Cleaver Francis Robinson Governor of Western Australia			
Rockton Road	Nedlands	1897	SS Rockton		Part of property developer Peet & Co's Prinsep Vale Estate, streets were named after Australasian United Steam Navigation Company's merchant vessels serving WA ports at the time	
Rookstone Court	Nedlands					
Smythe Road	Nedlands/Karrakatta	By 1838				
Stanley Street	Nedlands	By 1838				
Stirling Highway	Nedlands/Crawley			Perth-Fremantle Road		
Tareena Street	Nedlands					
Taylor Road	Nedlands					
The Avenue	Nedlands/Crawley					
Thomas Street	Nedlands					
Tyrell Street	Nedlands					
Verdun Street	Nedlands					
Viewway	Nedlands	By 1838			Was unnamed upon its creation	
Village Road	Nedlands					
Vincent Street	Nedlands					
Vix Street	Nedlands/Dalkeith					
Waroonga Road	Nedlands					
Webster Street	Nedlands					
Weld Street	Nedlands		Sir Frederick Aloysius Weld, Governor of Western Australia			
Williams Place	Nedlands					
Williams Road	Nedlands					
Wingfield Avenue	Nedlands					
Winthrop Avenue	Nedlands/Crawley	By 1838	Winthrop Hackett			
Withnell Drive	Nedlands	By 1838				
Wyvern Lane	Nedlands					

== See also ==
- List of streets in Perth
- List of streets in East Perth
- List of streets and paths in Kings Park
- List of streets in West Perth
- List of streets in Bayswater, Western Australia
- List of streets in Kardinya, Western Australia
