= Swan River Ferry Company =

Ferry operator on the Swan River, Perth

- Company type: Private
- Industry: Public transport
- Founded: 1897
- Founder: Rowland Pennington; Fred Bailey; Herman Sutton; John Olsen
- Defunct: 1949
- Fate: Liquidated
- Headquarters: South Perth, Western Australia
- Area served: Swan River, Western Australia
- Key people: Oscar Mouritz Olsen; Nat Lappin
- Services: River ferry services

The Swan River Ferry Company (also traded as Swan River Ferries) was a major operator of ferry services on the Swan River in Perth, Western Australia from its establishment in 1897 to its end in 1949.

== History ==
The company was founded in 1897 by Rowland Pennington and Fred Bailey as a public company named the River Ferry Company, using the vessels Mary Queen and Gladys, with services between Mends Street and Coode Street jetties, replacing an earlier irregular service managed by WF Tubbs, but the venture failed. In 1904 however, a boat hire and manufacturing business, Sutton & Olson, founded by shipwrights Harry Sutton), and John Olsen, both of Scandinavian heritage, took over the company with a consistent service created with the inaugural vessel Valkyrie. Services expanded to Applecross, Canning Bridge, and Como.

John Olsen drowned in March 1907. His death was treated as suspicious as it coincided with Olsen's purchase of the Westralia ferry and his brother's arrival in Perth. After Olsen's death his son Oscar Mouritz Olsen became involved in the company, before taking it over when Harry Sutton died on 27 June 1922. That same year the company's yard burned down with several vessels lost including the 5.5-metre-long (18 ft) skiff Mele Bilo. In 1935 the entire company and its assets were bought by Nat Lappin, after Oscar Mouritz Olsen drowned that same year. Lappin continued the ferry services until 1949 when increasing competition from public transport forced the business into liquidation, with the route now operated by Transperth.

During World War II two of the fleet's "Val-boat" ferries, including Valdura, were requisitioned for use as troopships on the Nile in Egypt.

== Fleet ==
=== "Val-boat" ferries ===
List of motor ferries operated by the Swan River Ferry company
Image	Name	Builder	Built/launched	Length	Capacity	Notes
	Valkyrie	Sutton & Olsen	1904		45 passengers	
	Valhalla	Sutton & Olsen	1905		78 passengers	Capacity increased to carry 84 passengers.
	Valdhana	Sutton & Olsen	1905	12.19 metres		
	Valdemar	J. Asquith & S. Lawrence			65 passengers	
	Valdavia	J. Asquith & S. Lawrence			76 passengers	
	Valthora	Thomas Hill			78 passengers	
	Valthera	Sutton & Olsen				
	Valhalb	Sutton & Olsen				
	Valfrida	Thomas Hill	c. 1910		100 passengers	
	Valdura	Thomas Hill	1912	13 metres	76 passengers	Donated by the Swan River Trust to the WA Maritime Museum in 1993
	Valmeda	Frederick & Eric Carnaby, Nedlands	1915		84 passengers	
	Valdana	Albert E. Lawrence (W. & S. Lawrence)	1919	20.42 metres	254 passengers	Double-decker ferry. First vessel to be built entirely of jarrah.
	Valkyrie II	Albert E. Lawrence (W. & S. Lawrence)	24 September 1928	18.59 metres	228 passengers	Designed by Thomas Hill. Double-decker ferry.
