= Market City =

Market City may refer to:

- Market City, Canning Vale, a wholesale food market in Canning Vale, Western Australia
- Market City, Haymarket, a shopping centre in Haymarket, Sydney
