= List of acts of the Parliament of Western Australia from 2006 =

This is a list of acts of the Parliament of Western Australia for the year 2006.

== 2006 ==
Short title, or popular name	Citation	Royal assent
Long title
Dangerous Sexual Offenders Act 2006	No. 1 of 2006	30 March 2006
An Act to provide for the detention in custody of persons of a particular class, or for their supervision, and for other purposes.
Railway Discontinuance Act 2006	No. 2 of 2006	30 March 2006
An Act to provide for the discontinuance of certain portions of railway and to authorise the disposition of certain material and land, and for related purposes.
Statute Law Revision Act 2006	No. 37 of 2006	4 July 2006
An Act to repeal various obsolete written laws, to consequentially amend various written laws and for related purposes.
Swan and Canning Rivers Management Act 2006	No. 51 of 2006	6 October 2006
An Act to make provision for—: the protection of the Swan and Canning Rivers and associated land to ensure maintenance of ecological and community benefits and amenity; the establishment of a Trust with planning, protection and management functions in respect of the Swan and Canning Rivers and associated land; the management policies to be followed by the Trust and other persons in relation to the Swan and Canning Rivers and associated land; the establishment of a Foundation with fund-raising and other functions, and for related purposes.
Daylight Saving Act 2006	No. 61 of 2006	24 November 2006
An Act to provide for a trial period of daylight saving throughout the State and a referendum thereafter on the question of daylight saving on a permanent basis, to alter standard time accordingly if the majority of electors indicates approval of daylight saving in the referendum.
	No. X of 2006	
Financial Legislation Amendment and Repeal Act 2006 or the Financial Management (Transitional Provisions) Act 2006	No. 77 of 2006	21 December 2006
An Act—: to repeal the Financial Administration and Audit Act 1985; (Note: Financial Administration and Audit Act 1985 (No. 117)); to amend various Acts; and; to enact transitional provisions, as a consequence of, and in connection with, the enactment of—: the Auditor General Act 2006; (Note: Auditor General Act 2006 (No. 75)) and; the Financial Management Act 2006, (Note: Financial Management Act 2006 (No. 76)); and for related purposes.

== Sources ==
- "legislation.wa.gov.au".
