= Coode Street Jetty =

Jetty in Perth, Western Australia

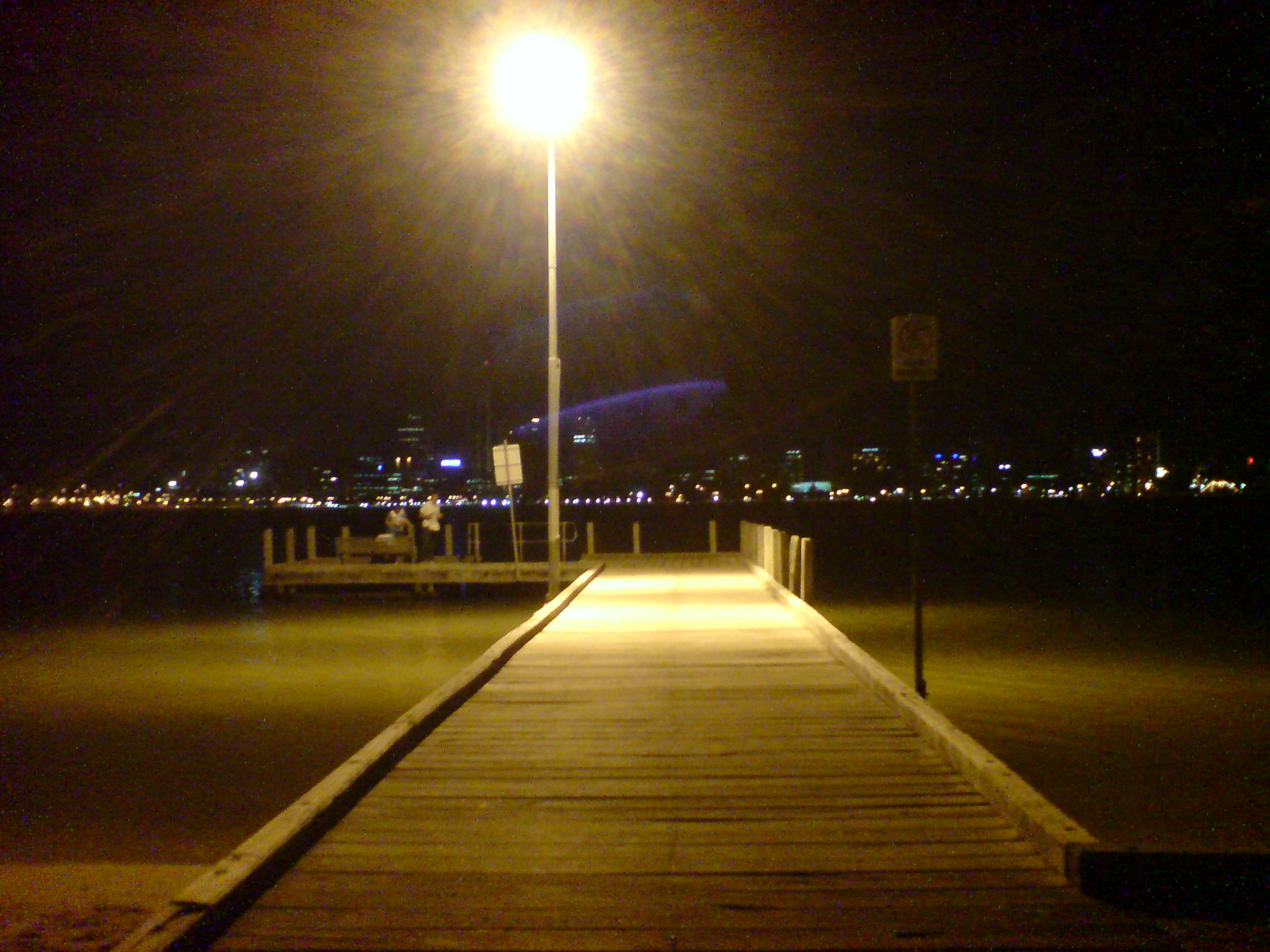

General information
- Location: Coode Street, South Perth; Australia
- Owner: Public Transport Authority
- Platforms: 1 jetty
Location

Coode Street Jetty is located in South Perth in Western Australia. The jetty is on the southern shore of the Swan River in the section known as Perth Water.

== History ==
An earlier jetty existed, also with an adjacent pool, before the construction of a newer jetty along the altered shore-line. It was a timetabled stop for the Swan River Ferry Company from at least 1916 for services to South Perth. One of the ferries which worked this route, the Valdura, is now preserved.

Coode Street Jetty was served by Transperth services from Barrack Street and occasionally via Mends Street until services ceased on 30 April 2005 due to lack of patronage.
