= Edith Dircksey Cowan Memorial =

Heritage listed memorial in Perth, Western Australia

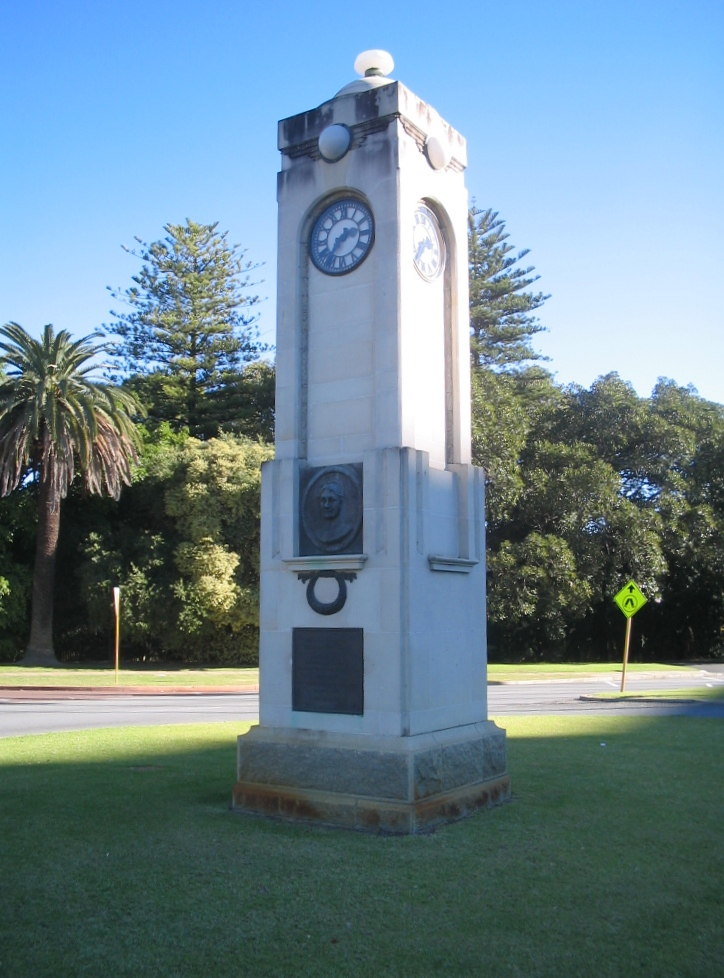
- Edith Dircksey Cowan Memorial at the entrance to Kings Park
- Interactive map of the Edith Dircksey Cowan Memorial area

General information
- Type: Memorial
- Location: Kings Park, Perth, Western Australia
- Coordinates: 31.954051°S 115.844368°E

Western Australia Heritage Register
- Type: State Registered Place
- Designated: 5 January 2001
- Reference no.: 2232

The Edith Dircksey Cowan Memorial, formerly known as the Edith Cowan Memorial Clock, is a clock tower at the entrance to Kings Park in Perth, Western Australia. It was built in 1934 as a memorial to Edith Cowan, the first female member of any Australian parliament. It was unveiled on 9 June 1934 and is the first civic monument erected in Australia to honour an Australian woman.

== Monument ==
The Edith Dircksey Cowan Memorial stands at the top of a hill on a traffic island at the junction of Kings Park Road, Malcolm Street and Fraser Avenue, immediately opposite the main entrance to Kings Park. It is about 6 metres (20 ft) high, and is built from Donnybrook freestone in the interwar Art Deco style. In addition to a working clock, it features a bronze plate with a full face portrait of Cowan, and a plaque with the inscription:

Erected in honour of
Edith Dircksey Cowan.
O.B.E., J.P.
By those who admired
her many good works for humanity.
1861–1932
First woman member of parliament
in Australia.
A life of service.

== History ==
Edith Cowan was a campaigner for women's rights, the welfare and protection of disadvantaged women and children, and other social issues. She was instrumental in the decision to build the King Edward Memorial Hospital for Women, and was a co-founder of the National Council of Women and the Royal Western Australian Historical Society. In 1920, after Western Australia passed legislation allowing women to stand for parliament, Cowan won a seat in the Western Australian Legislative Assembly, thereby becoming the first woman to hold a seat in any Australian parliament.

Cowan died on 9 June 1932, and the following month the Western Australian branch of the National Council for Women scheduled a meeting to discuss the erection of a memorial to her. The meeting was held on 22 September, with the main point of contention being whether the memorial should be a monument or something more utilitarian. Utilitarian proposals included an Edith Cowan Ward at King Edward Memorial Hospital; a model baby health centre; an honour drive in Kings Park; or a pathway in the Parliament House grounds. These were eventually rejected in favour of a monument in Kings Park.

An Edith Cowan Memorial Committee was then formed to raise funds for a monument. In October the committee wrote to the Kings Park Board to seek approval for the erection of a monument in the park, and suggesting that it could take the form of an archway at the entrance gates. The Kings Park Board refused their request, stating that:

the Board have other suggestions in view re the Main Gates, and are disinclined to favourably view the erection of further memorials other than National ones, within the Kings Park.

This response caused some offense, as it seemed to imply that Cowan was not considered a person of national significance.

Around this time, the committee became aware that the Perth City Council was considering the erection of a safety zone for pedestrians in the middle of Kings Park Circus. This was to be a raised circular platform surrounded by pylons. A number of suggestions had been made for a centrepiece for the safety zone, including relocating the Perth Observatory clock there, or using the site for the Lord Forrest Memorial or the State War Memorial. In December 1932, the Edith Cowan Memorial Committee requested the council's permission to locate a monument there, and this was approved. Prominent Perth architect Harold Boas and city engineer Henry Atwell then began work on a design for the monument. Their design was approved by the Edith Cowan Memorial Committee in February 1933, and a sketch of the design was published in The West Australian. Margaret Johnson of Mount Hawthorn designed the bust in relief with a wreath of gum leaves and nuts.

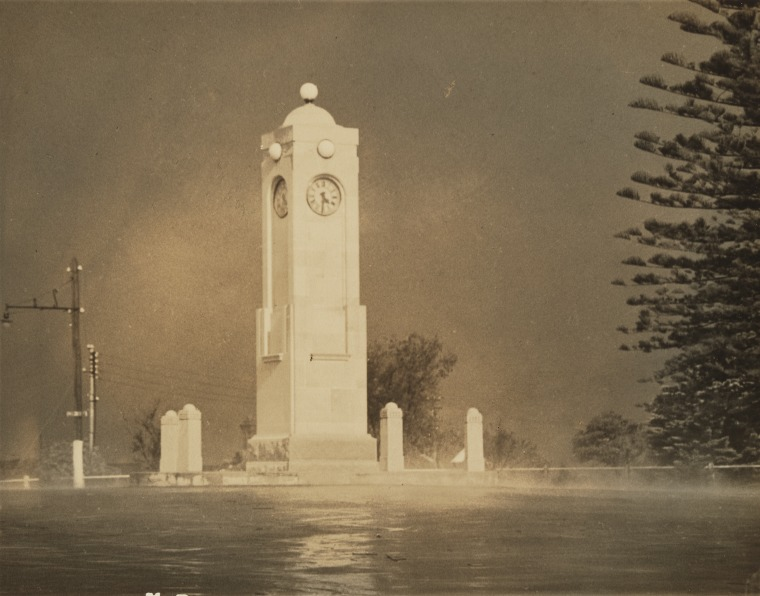
Monument c. 1935, before traffic island was enlarged, pylons removed, and platform replaced by lawn

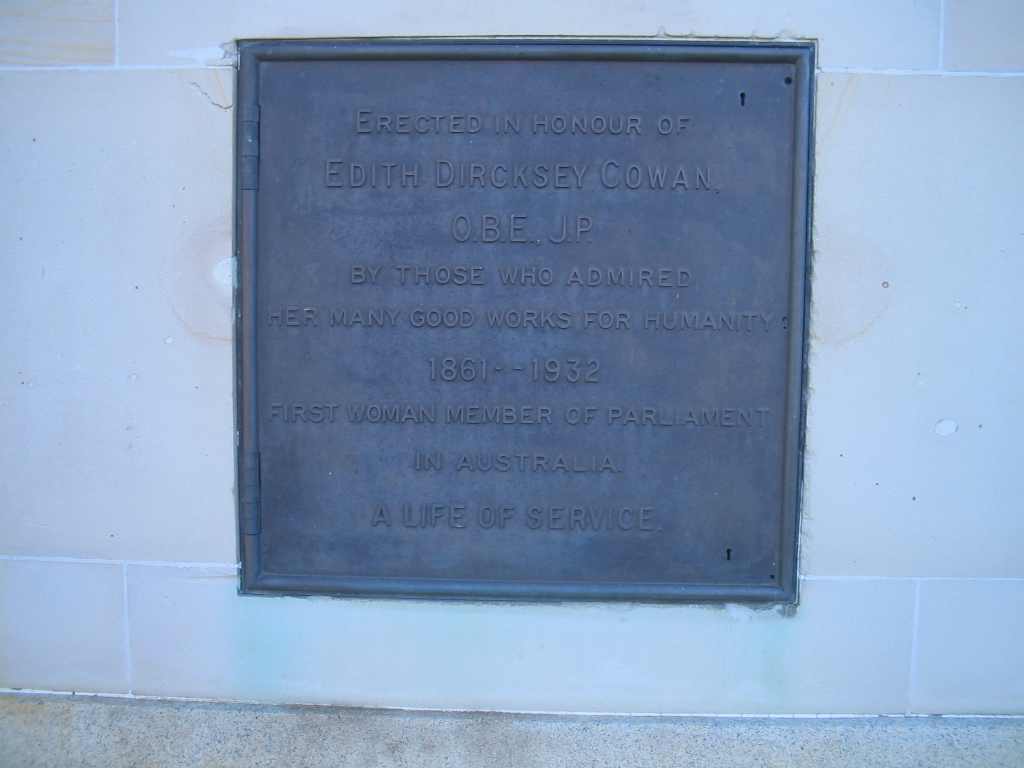
Inscription plaque

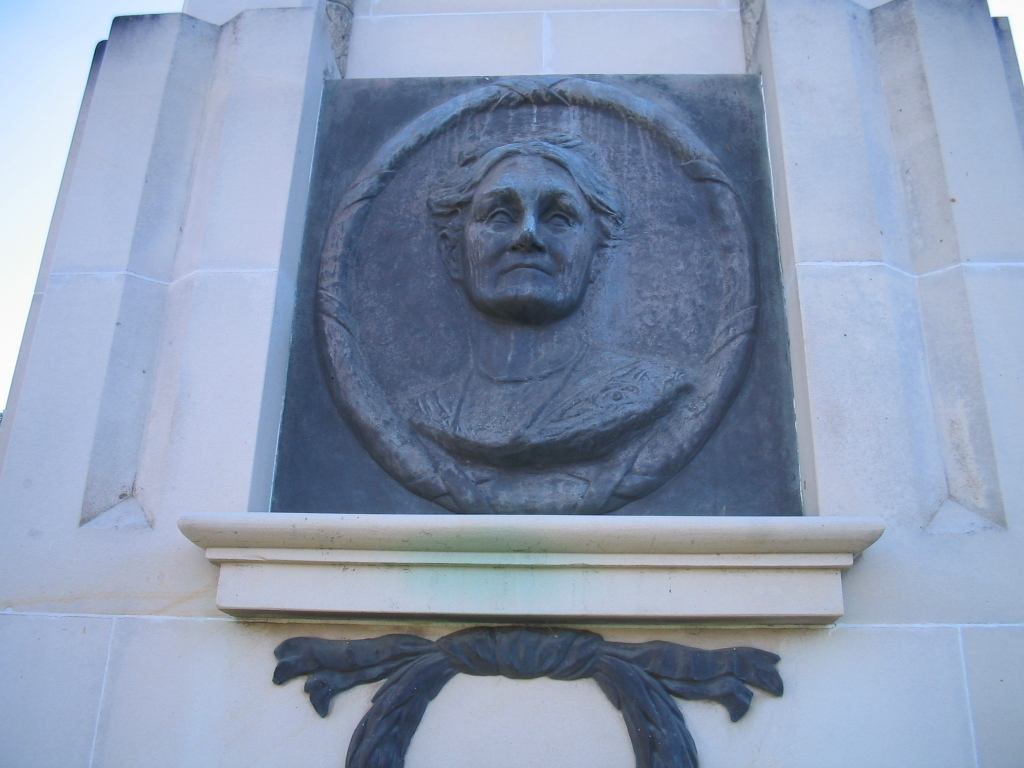
Bronze face portrait, by Margaret Johnson of Mount Hawthorn

In response to the publication of the design, protests were lodged by the Kings Park Board, the Royal Institute of Architects and the Town Planning Institute. Opinion on the monument's design was mixed, but all protests shared the view that the site was one of the most outstanding in Perth, and should be reserved for a memorial of national significance. There were also suggestions that such monuments were masculine in nature; opponents of the monument asserted that it was inappropriate for a woman to be memorialised in such as way; but supporters countered that Cowan had succeeded in a "male domain" and so merited a monument as a memorial. The debate, which has been viewed as "representative of a gender bias operating at the time", continued throughout 1933. The Town Planning Commissioner David Lomas Davidson even sought an injunction against construction of the monument in the Supreme Court. This injunction was eventually refused, and construction of the monument went ahead. Perth portrait painter Margaret Johnson was selected to sculpt Cowan's portrait, and W. Ogilvy won the construction contract. Work began on the monument in May 1934, and Lieutenant-Governor James Mitchell unveiled it on 9 June, the second anniversary of Cowan's death.

The monument and its surroundings remained largely unchanged until some time after 1974, when the traffic island was enlarged, the pylons removed, and the platform replaced by lawn. The Edith Dircksey Cowan Memorial remains at the location, and is considered to be in good condition. It was re-dedicated on 12 March 1996, the 75th anniversary of Cowan's election to parliament.

== Sources ==
- Cowan, Peter (1978). A Unique Position. A Biography of Edith Dircksey Cowan 1861–1932. Nedlands: University of Western Australia Press. ISBN 0-85564-135-5. LCCN 79670162. OCLC 5515946. OL 4072831M.
- Ward, Christine (5 January 2001). Edith Dircksey Cowan Memorial (Report). Register of Heritage Places - Assessment Documentation. Heritage Council of Western Australia.
- "Edith Cowan Memorial". The West Australian. Vol. 50, no. 9971. Western Australia. 15 June 1934. p. 6 – via National Library of Australia.
- "Portrait Modelling". The West Australian. Vol. 50, no. 9971. Western Australia. 15 June 1934. p. 6 – via National Library of Australia.
