= Transport in Perth, Western Australia =

Transport in Perth, Western Australia, is served by various means, among them an extensive highway/freeway network and a substantial system of commuter rail lines and bus routes. Public transport is managed by the Transperth agency.

== History ==
Following the settlement of the Swan River Colony in 1829, the Swan River was the main transportation link between Perth and the port of Fremantle. Land transportation was difficult as the only river crossing near Perth, a ford at the eastern end of the town, was often impassable for wagons and carts. The next crossing point was 32 kilometres (20 mi) upstream at Guildford, a major detour. The only alternative to these river crossings were ferries, which operated from North Fremantle, Preston Point, and The Narrows.

== Road transport ==
Perth has an extensive road network centred around three freeways and nine metropolitan highways. It has no toll roads.

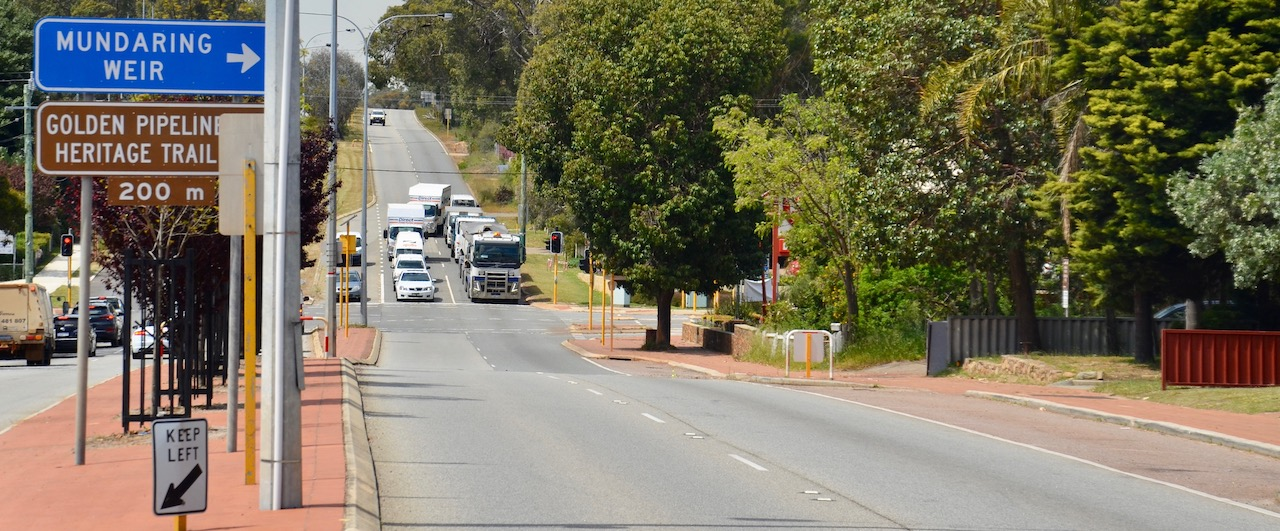
Great Eastern Highway

=== Highways and Freeways ===
The Mitchell Freeway connects the city centre to Joondalup, in Perth's northern suburbs. The Kwinana Freeway runs through and beyond the city's southern suburbs towards Mandurah and Bunbury. The Graham Farmer Freeway, incorporating the Northbridge tunnel, was built in 2000, primarily to provide a road link between East Perth and West Perth and act as a city bypass.

The port city of Fremantle, and adjacent suburbs, are linked to the city centre via Stirling Highway, which travels on the north side of the Swan River after crossing into North Fremantle on the Stirling Bridge. On the southern side of the river, Canning Highway, which later continues on as Great Eastern Highway, connects Fremantle to Midland, north-east of the city centre. Leach Highway is a parallel route that terminates at the edge of Perth Airport. Marmion Avenue is the northern continuation of West Coast Highway, which runs near the coastline, from Swanbourne to Trigg.

The arterial routes out of the Perth Metropolitan Region radiate out as a series of spokes. Stock Road, Rockingham Road, Patterson Road, Ennis Avenue, and Mandurah Road are part of Highway 1, and a coastal route to the areas south of Perth. Kwinana Freeway, and its continuation as Forrest Highway, provide a controlled access alternative (State Route 2) further inland, which meets up with Highway 1 (as Old Coast Road) at Lake Clifton, south of Mandurah. Albany Highway (State Route 30) travels in a south-easterly direction to Albany, Western Australia. At Armadale, in Perth's south-eastern suburbs, South Western Highway (State Route 20) branches off Albany Highway, heading south towards Walpole on Western Australia's southern coast. Brookton Highway (State Route 40) leads from Albany Highway in Kelmscott (just north of Armadale) south-east towards Brookton.

From the Midland area, Great Eastern Highway connects to Kalgoorlie, and is part of National Highway 94, which leads to Adelaide, South Australia. Great Northern Highway links Perth to Wyndham in the state's north, and is the majority of National Highway 95 to Darwin, Northern Territory. It also carries Highway 1 northwards out of Perth. Toodyay Road (State Route 50) is a third route out of Midland, heading north-east to Toodyay. Wanneroo Road (State Route 60) is a north-western route from Perth towards Yanchep and beyond, and Marmion Avenue provides a parallel route to Yanchep.

=== Ring Road ===
Roe Highway offers a controlled access route between the Kwinana Freeway, east of Jandakot, east of Fremantle, and Midland. There was a plan to extend Roe Highway, Perth's southern half of its ring road, towards Fremantle via overpasses and a tunnel. Roe Highway has also been proposed to extend to Stock Road in Coolbellup. In Middle Swan, one suburb north of Midland, Reid Highway is the continuation of Roe Highway, travelling west to North Beach, where it meets Marmion Avenue.

=== Traffic congestion ===
Weekday traffic congestion is worst during the morning peak hour, when traffic regularly slows to almost half the speed limit, and sometimes to a standstill. Depending on the road, the weekday peak hour is usually about 7am to 8am, or 8am to 9am. On weekends, congestion is worst later in the morning and harder to predict. Rather than being on roads into the central business district, it centres on beaches, shopping centres, white goods and other big-box stores, and children's sporting grounds, such as netball courts.

== Public transport ==
A Transperth commuter train

Perth metropolitan public transport, including trains, buses and ferries, are provided by Transperth, with links to rural areas provided by Transwa. Perth provides zero-fare train trips for SmartRider (travel fare card) holders around the city centre (the "Free Transit Zone"), as well as five high-frequency (every 8–15 minutes) Central Area Transit (CAT) bus routes (Red, Blue, Yellow, Green, Purple), which, alongside trips on regular Transperth buses in the city centre, are free to all users.

=== Suburban rail ===
There are eight suburban rail lines, 94 stations and 13 bus-only stations in the metropolitan area.

=== Bus ===
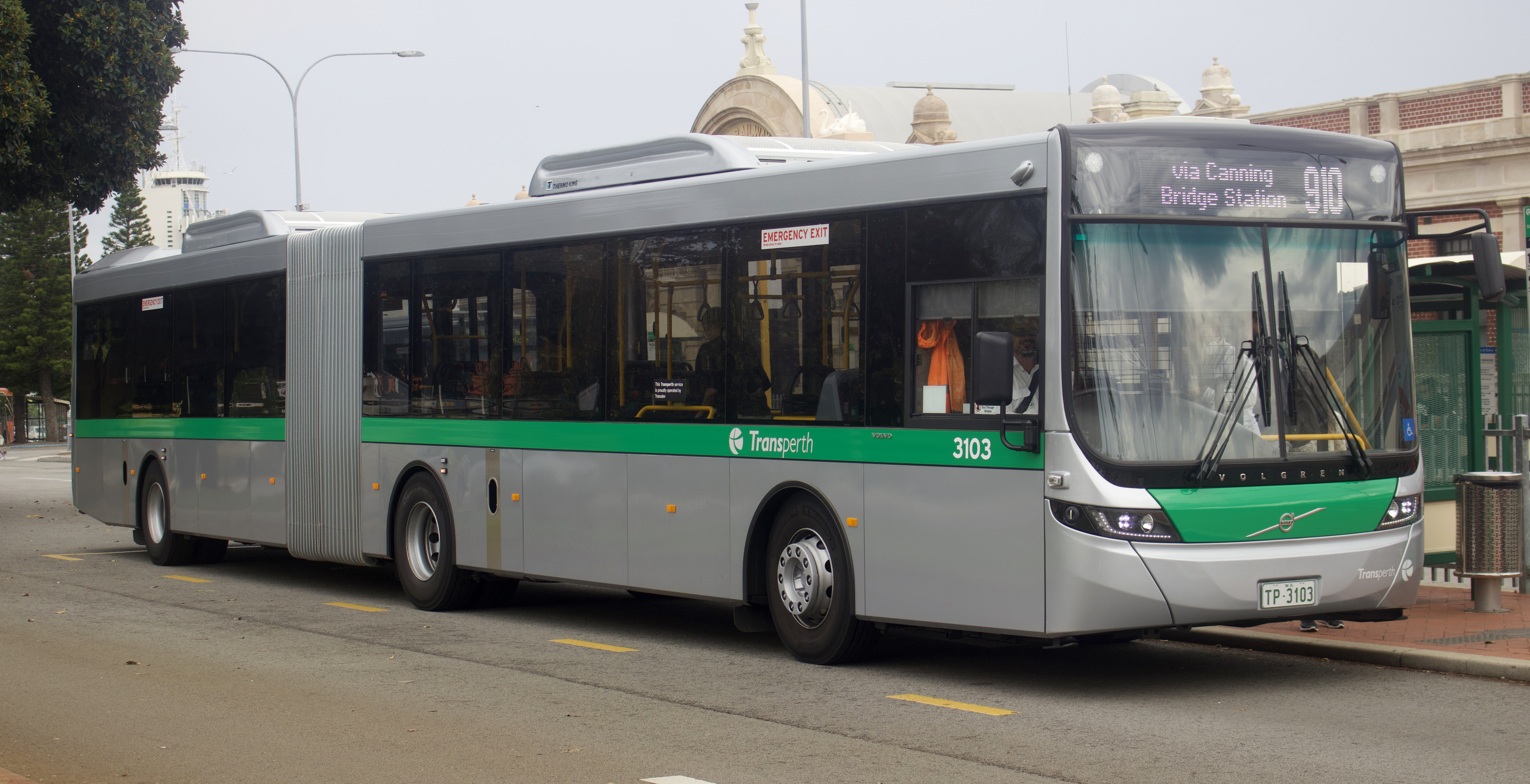
Transperth bus

An extensive bus network services the greater Perth metro area. Many bus routes act as feeder routes to the main rail lines.

There are high-frequency routes that serve Perth, connecting train stations and bus stations with 15 minute frequencies.

The CircleRoute, routes 998 (clockwise) and 999 (antic-clockwise), connect train stations on every rail line and multiple bus stations.

=== Regional and interstate rail ===
The Indian Pacific passenger rail service connects Perth with Adelaide and Sydney. The Prospector passenger rail service connects Perth with Kalgoorlie via several Wheatbelt towns, while the Australind connects to Bunbury, and the AvonLink connects to Northam.

=== Trams ===
Perth's first trams operated for a short period at the end of the nineteenth century, on an unsuccessful horse-car tramway between the GPO and East Perth.

The city's first electric trams began operating in 1899 between East Perth and West Perth, along Hay Street in central Perth. The electric tram network was ultimately expanded west as far as Claremont, north as far as Osborne Park, and south across the Swan River causeway to Victoria Park, Como and Welshpool.

The initial electric tram infrastructure in Perth was privately funded. The government took over the running of trams in 1914, with the aim of better co-ordinating the network. Trams were an integral part of the public transport system in the early 20th century until the advent of the private automobile. However, long term lack of government investment led to the network being phased out by July 1958. A number of Perth's historical trams are maintained at Whiteman Park.

Between 1905 and 1952, Fremantle had a small but comprehensive tramway network of its own. The Fremantle network was owned and operated by a consortium of local municipalities, and was never linked into the Perth network. Throughout its existence, the Fremantle network covered both the Fremantle municipality and the adjacent municipality of East Fremantle. Its tram lines also extended for part of that period into North Fremantle and Melville.

There are now various tourist buses decorated as "trams", but running on rubber tyred wheels independently of rails, in both Perth and Fremantle. They operate services such as the Kings Park tram tour and others.

In 2012 a light rail network, to be known as the Metro Area Express was announced. After being pushed back, it was shelved in 2016.

=== Smart public transport systems ===
Since 2024, Perth’s public transport network has seen significant advancements in smart technology and real-time functionality. The Transperth mobile app now offers live tracking of buses, trains, and ferries, allowing commuters to view real-time service information and next arrivals.

Transperth has also been steadily upgrading the SmartRider card system, including phased rollouts of new readers and value-loading machines, with plans to support contactless payments via debit/credit cards and mobile wallets by 2025.

On the road network side, Western Australia's “Smart Freeway” systems; first deployed on the Kwinana Freeway in 2020 and expanded to the Mitchell Freeway in December 2024, implementing over 1,400 sensors, CCTV, on‑ramp signals, digital gantries, and variable speed signs. These systems collect and analyse real-time traffic data to optimise flow, enhance safety, and reportedly reduce peak-hour commute times by up to seven minutes.

== Cycling ==
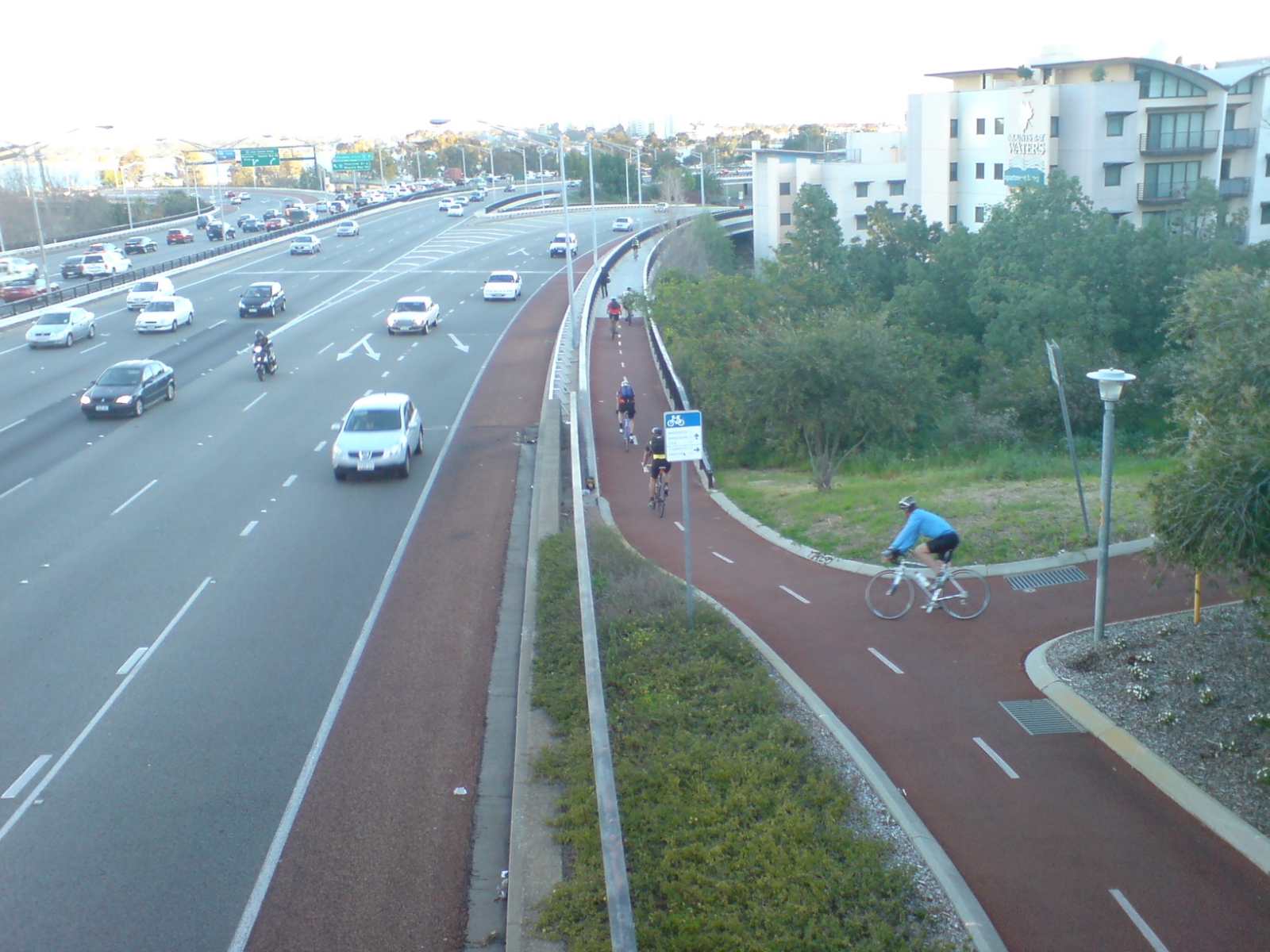
Many of Perth's cycling routes run along other transport routes, such as rail lines and freeways. This makes them popular for commuters. Other routes in parks and along coastlines serve more recreational users.

Cycling in Perth is common on the roads and paths for recreation, commuting and sport. Between 1998 and 2009 the number of cyclists in Perth increased 450%.

== Airports ==
Perth is served by Perth Airport in the city's east for regional, domestic and international flights and Jandakot Airport in the city's southern suburbs for general aviation and charter flights.

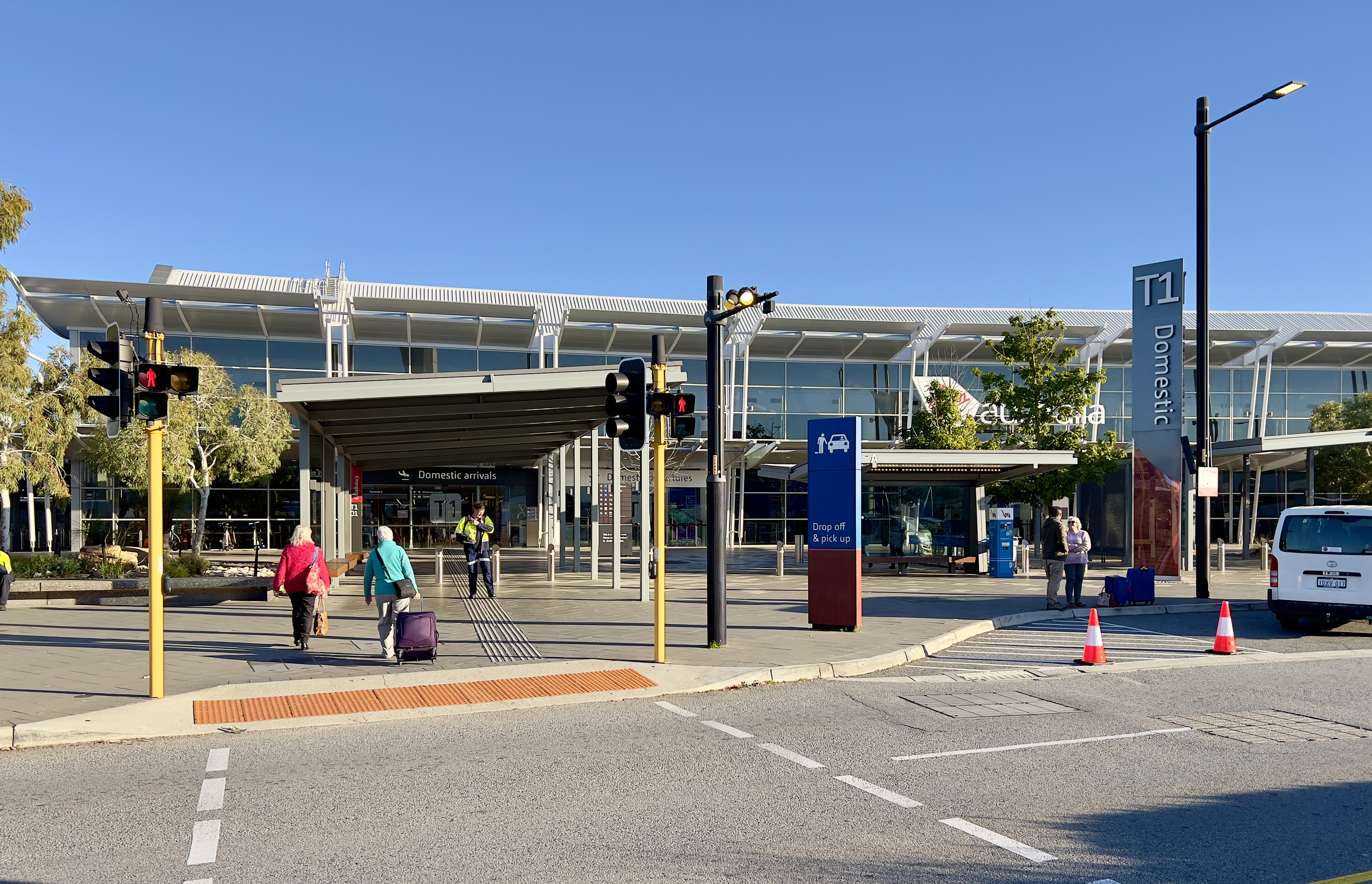
Perth Airport is the primary international and domestic gateway for Western Australia, located about 10 km east of Perth’s city centre.
