= Margaret Johnson (artist) =

Australian portrait artist

Margaret G. Johnson, (1898 – 1967) was a Sri Lankan born Australian portrait artist.

== Early life ==
Margaret G. Woods was born to father James Wood, a Scotsman in Kadugannawa, Ceylon. She was one of seven children who all had an interest in painting and drawing. At a young age her father immigrated to Western Australia. She was educated in Perth and after completing her schooling was sent to the Glasgow School of Art.

== Education ==
Johnson was fifteen years old when she attended the Glasgow School of Art, three years younger than the usual entrance age. Johnson studied under Maurice Greiffenhagen and Professor McKeller, concentrating on painting and modelling. Completing her four-year course in three years, Johnson returned to Western Australia after the end of World War I and married.

== Career ==
As a portrait artist she specialised in portraiture painting, especially watercolours, but also created works in pencil, pastels and oil. Her portraits would be found in the National Gallery of Australia, Parliament House in Perth, and at the Perth City Council. Her works include J.W. Johnson Esq., The Tartan Scarf, The Debutante and the Resting Model. Her portraits of Prime Minister John Curtin and Perth Art Gallery curator George Pitt Morison are found in the Art Gallery of Western Australia, while James Mitchell's portrait was in the Treasurer Building and John Kirwan in Parliament House. Johnson also exhibited her portrait of Pitt-Morrison for the Archibald Prize. Her other exhibits for the prize included General Gordon Bennett.

She was a member of the West Australian Society of Arts, and taught painting and art at the Busselton Technical School.

=== Edith Dircksey Cowan Memorial ===
In 1934, her model for a portrait plaque of Edith Cowan was chosen from several local Western Australian entries to be the choice for a memorial work on a clock tower in Kings Park, Perth. The Cowan bust was in high relief above a wreath of gum leaves and nuts and was cast in bronze, above a bronze inscription on the eastern face of the clock tower.
