= Valdura =

Former ferry on Swan River, Western Australia

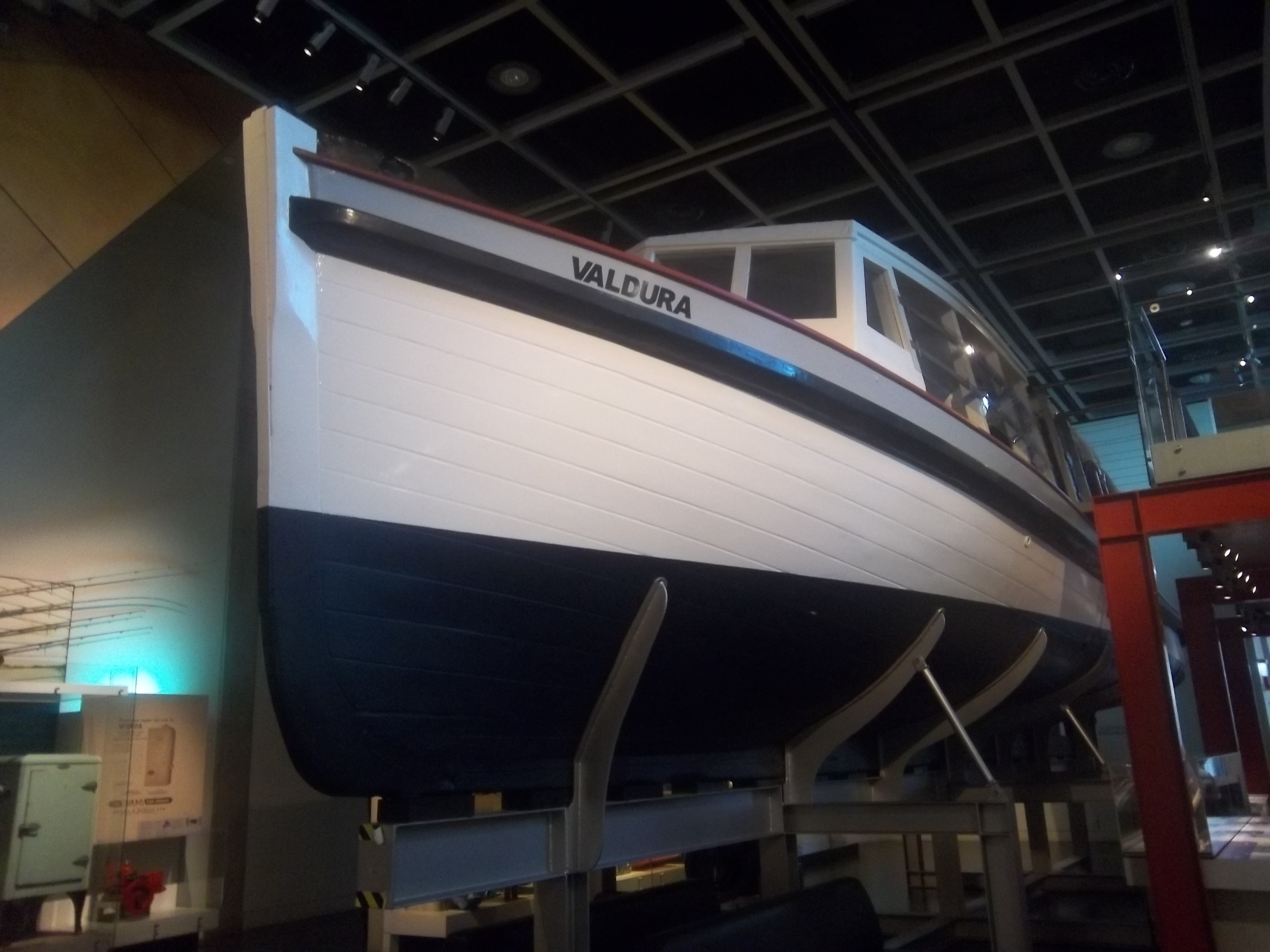
- Valdura as displayed in the WA Maritime Museum in January 2021

History

Australia
- Name: Valdura
- Operator: Swan River Ferry Company
- Port of registry: Fremantle
- Builder: Thomas Hill
- In service: 1912
- Out of service: 1967
- Renamed: Penguin
- Identification: Vessel No. HV000660
- Fate: Preserved

General characteristics
- Type: Ferry
- Length: 13 m (42.7 ft)
- Propulsion: 19 hp (14 kW) Gardner engine
- Capacity: 76 passengers

MV Valdura (later named Penguin) is a preserved small ferry used on the Swan River, Western Australia, and in Fremantle Harbour between 1912 and 1967. It is the only surviving "Val-boat" class ferry, which were one of the main types of ferry used on the Swan River between 1904 and 1949 when ferry services were the primary mode of transport on the river.

== History ==
Valdura was built in 1912 by Thomas Hill in Perth for the Swan River Ferry Company founded by the Scandinavian immigrants Herman "Harry" Sutton and Jack Olsen for use on the Swan River, it was constructed with a jarrah frame, karri planking, and likely propelled at this time by a Union 15 horsepower (11 kW) 2-cylinder engine, as this was the engine installed on sister-ship Valkyrie, with a total capacity of 76 passengers. In the 1916 timetable Valdura operated a regular service with sister-ship Valdemar from South Perth to Coode Street Jetty, with men charged 21 shillings, equivalent to A$119.74 in 2022, each quarter, and women charged 12 shillings and sixpence, A$71.84 in 2022, per quarter. The company changed hands in 1935 with the fleet sold to Nat Lappin with ferry services continuing as well as for-hire services operated by the Royal Ophir Pleasure Boat Company.

It was appropriated for use as a troopship in the Middle East during World War II, along with one other Val-boat.

After the war, Lappin sold the fleet in 1949 due to increasing competition from public transport, with Valdura being part of four Val-boats sold to the Fremantle Harbour Trust in 1953 for use to transport workers around Fremantle Harbour between North and South wharves. After the sale it was renamed Penguin and underwent a year-long overhaul with new superstructure, wheelhouse, and a 19-horsepower (14 kW) Gardner engine installed. In 1967 it was replaced by a purpose-built vessel and was sold to a private owner.

Valdura was used as a houseboat before being abandoned in the Swan River, becoming a danger to navigation, the Swan River Trust donating the stricken ship to the WA Maritime Museum in 1993, its restoration was complete by 2001, and Valdura is now displayed in the main maritime museum building at Elizabeth Quay. Valdura Place in the Perth central business district is named after the ferry.
