= Outram Street =

Street in Perth, Western Australia

Outram Street Western Australia
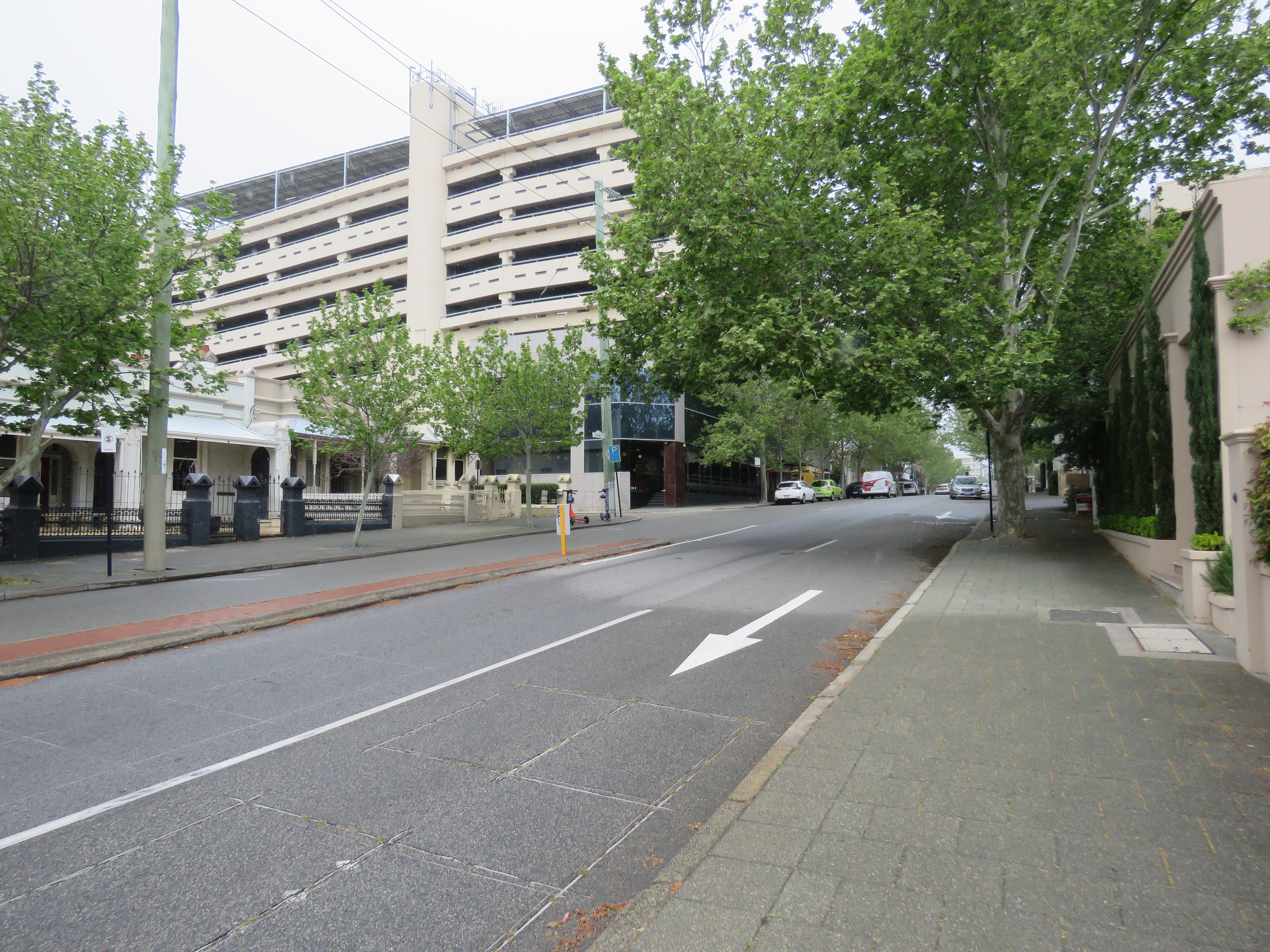
- Looking south along Outram Street from Wellington Street

General information
- Type: Street
- Length: 750 m (0.5 mi)

Major junctions
- South end: Kings Park Road
- Ord Street; Hay Street; Murray Street
- North end: Wellington Street (State Route 65)

Location(s)
- Suburb(s): West Perth

Outram Street is a 750-metre-long (0.5 mi) street, named after Sir James Outram, in West Perth.

== Location ==
The street runs parallel to Colin and Havelock Streets (which are further to the east and closer to the CBD), from Kings Park Road to Wellington Street.

== History ==
For a significant part of the early twentieth century, wealthy merchants and politicians had family homes in the street. Some of the significant structures from that era remain intact, but with different uses.

By the late 1930s the development of blocks of flats and apartments were beginning to change the landscape of Outram Street and West Perth.

In the transition from residential suburb to concentrated office accommodation, values of land have made it a significant location adjacent to the Perth CBD.

== Heritage value ==
Some of the structures like the Outram Street Terraces (number 74-82) have been on the Interim Heritage Register since 2000.
