= Perth Metropolitan Markets =

Former markets in Perth, Western Australia

The Perth Metropolitan Markets were a fruit and vegetable wholesale markets located at 840 (Lots 500-504) Wellington Street in West Perth from 1929 to 1989, when it moved to Market City, Canning Vale.

The markets were originally established at Roe Street, Perth, at the western end of the railway station (regularly referred to as the "Old Markets"), with a more comprehensive market constructed on a 111-acre site, bounded by Wellington, Sutherland and Market Streets by the Metropolitan Market Trust. The trust was established by the Government of Western Australia in September 1927. The Wellington Street Markets were formally opened on 14 June 1929 by the Deputy Premier of Western Australia, John Willcock. The site incorporated an auctioneering area (72,750 sq ft), meat markets (2,400 sq ft) and egg and poultry markets (9,900 sq ft). The site also included a public restaurant, post office and several bank branch offices.

By the 1950s protective restrictions on road transport by the Road Transport Regulation Board were being lightened, and more trucking of produce into and away from the markets was beginning to have effect on Wellington Street.

The closing down of various freight services on the Western Australian Government Railways system as it was changed to a bulk freight operation, and its new brand and style of operation, saw the location of the markets and proximity to the central business district and the high land values as a problem.

Various reviews and changes to processes at the markets were occurring prior to the closure.

In 1990, the Metropolitan Market Trust changed its name to the Perth Market Authority and in 1989 the Authority relocated the markets to a site in Canning Vale.

The original market site has since been redeveloped and is the site of Watertown Brand Outlet Centre and the offices of the Royal Automobile Club of Western Australia.
