= Market City, Canning Vale =

Fruit and vegetable market in Perth, Australia

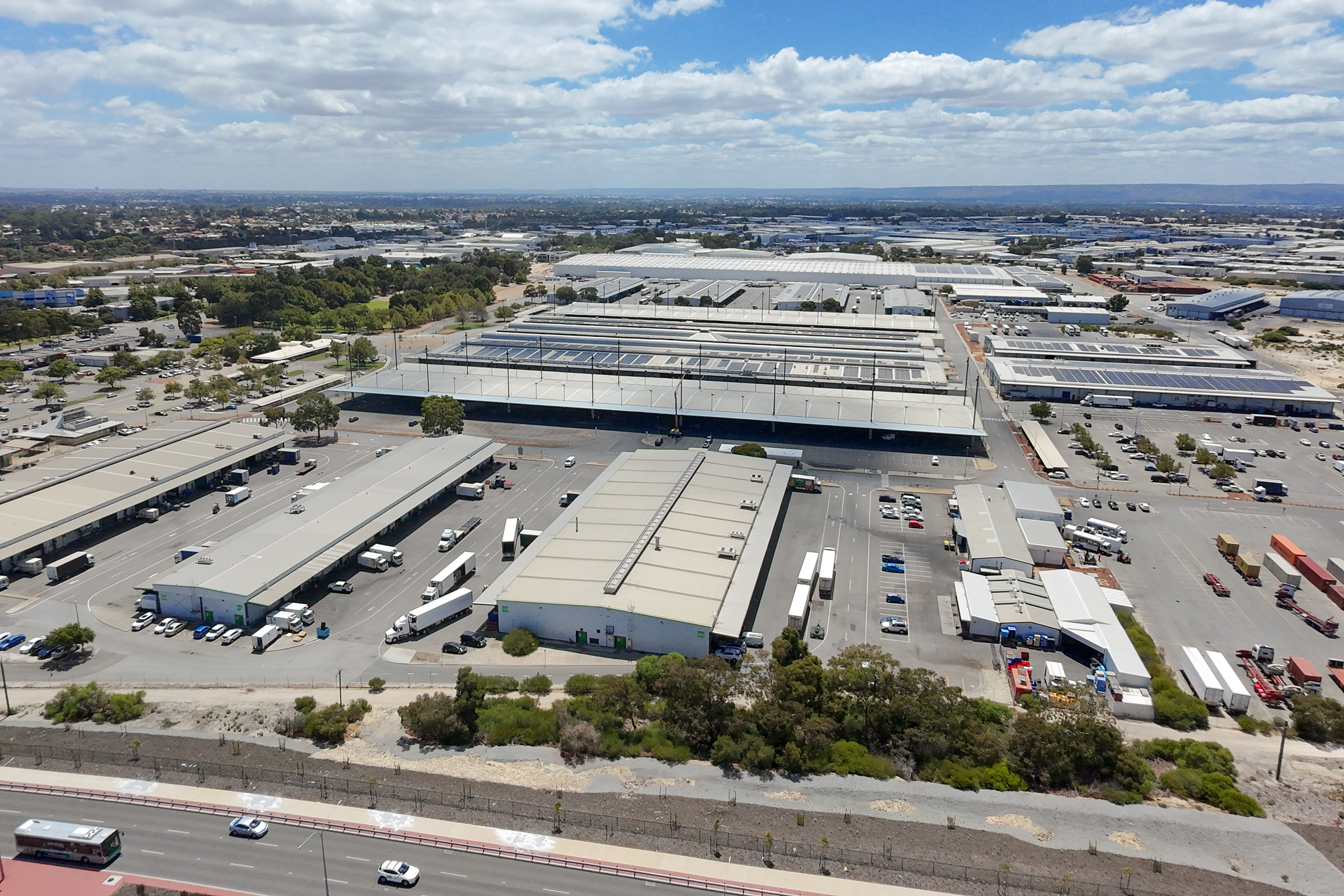
Market City in February 2026

Market City in Canning Vale, Australia is the successor to the earlier Perth Metropolitan Markets which had operated in the Perth central business district from 1929 to 1998.

It is the current central wholesale market of fruit and vegetable produce in Western Australia, which was organised by the Metropolitan Market Trust, and is currently operated by the Perth Market Authority.

It is also a location of offices that consider the marketing and distribution of produce internationally and nationally.

Built by Leighton Contractors, it opened in November 1989.
