= Swan River Trust =

Defunct statutory authority of Western Australian

Coordinates: 32°S 115.85°E

Agency overview
- Formed: 1989
- Jurisdiction: Government of Western Australia
- Agency executive: Rod Hughes, general manager
- Parent agency: Swan River Trust
- Website: www.swanrivertrust.wa.gov.au

The Swan River Trust was a Western Australian state government statutory authority defined by the Swan and Canning Rivers Management Act 2006. The trust reported to the Minister for Environment.

It was preceded by the Swan River Management Authority (1977–1989) and earlier Swan River Conservation Board (1959–1976). It was established in 1989 to protect and manage the Swan and Canning rivers.

In 1993 they donated the derelict houseboat Valdura, a former Swan river ferry built in 1912 to the Western Australian Maritime Museum.

The Trust had several community engagement programs that allowed the Perth community to be involved in caring for the Swan Canning Riverpark including River Guardians, the Dolphin Watch Project, and Ribbons of Blue.

On 1 July 2015, the staff and functions of the Swan River Trust were merged with the Department of Parks and Wildlife. A subsequent renaming eventuated in the title Department of Biodiversity, Conservation and Attractions.

== See also ==
- Department of Conservation and Land Management
- Department of Environment and Conservation (Western Australia)
