= Robert William Hay =

British public official (1786–1861)

Robert William Hay FRS
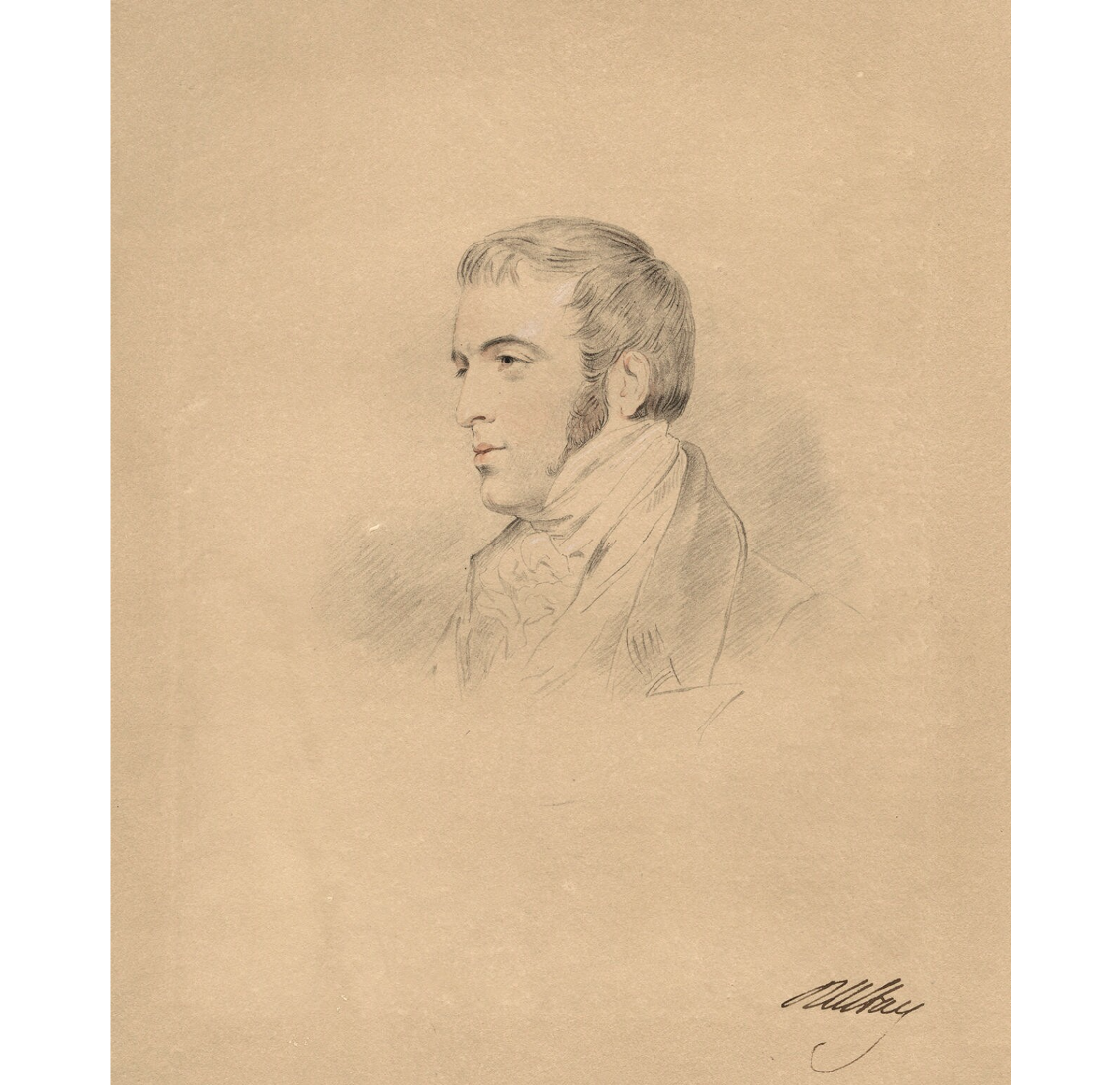
- Born: 1786; Westminster, London, England
- Died: 9 May 1861 (aged 74–75); Malta
- Occupation: Public official
- Parent(s): Rev. George William Auriol Hay-Drummond; Elizabeth Margaret (Marshall) Hay-Drummond
- Relatives: Robert Hay Drummond (paternal grandfather)

Robert William Hay (1786–1861) was a British public official.

== Biography ==
=== Early life ===
Robert William Hay was born in 1786 in Westminster, London, England. His father was Reverend George William Auriol Hay-Drummond and his mother Elizabeth Margaret (Marshall) Hay-Drummond. His paternal grandfather was Robert Hay Drummond (1711–1776), who served as the Archbishop of York from 1761 to 1776.

He graduated from Christ Church, Oxford, where he received a Bachelor of Arts degree in 1807 and a Master of Arts degree in 1809.

=== Career ===
From 1812 to 1824, he served as Private Secretary to Henry Dundas, 1st Viscount Melville (1742–1811), who was First Lord of the Admiralty, and then served as Victualling Commissioner in the British Royal Navy.

He served as the Permanent Under-Secretaries of State for the Colonies from 1825 to 1836. However, James Stephen (1789–1859) is credited with doing much of the work.

In 1831, Hay was appointed to serve on the Government Commission upon Emigration, which was wound up in 1832.

He was elected a Fellow of the Royal Society in 1814.

=== Death ===
He died on 9 May 1861 in Malta.

== Legacy ==
- Hay Street, a major road in the central business district of Perth, Western Australia, is named in his honour.

Government offices
Preceded by New post	Permanent Under-Secretary of State for the Colonies; 1825–1836	Succeeded by Sir James Stephen
