= Kings Park Road =

Road in Perth, Western Australia

Kings Park Road Western Australia
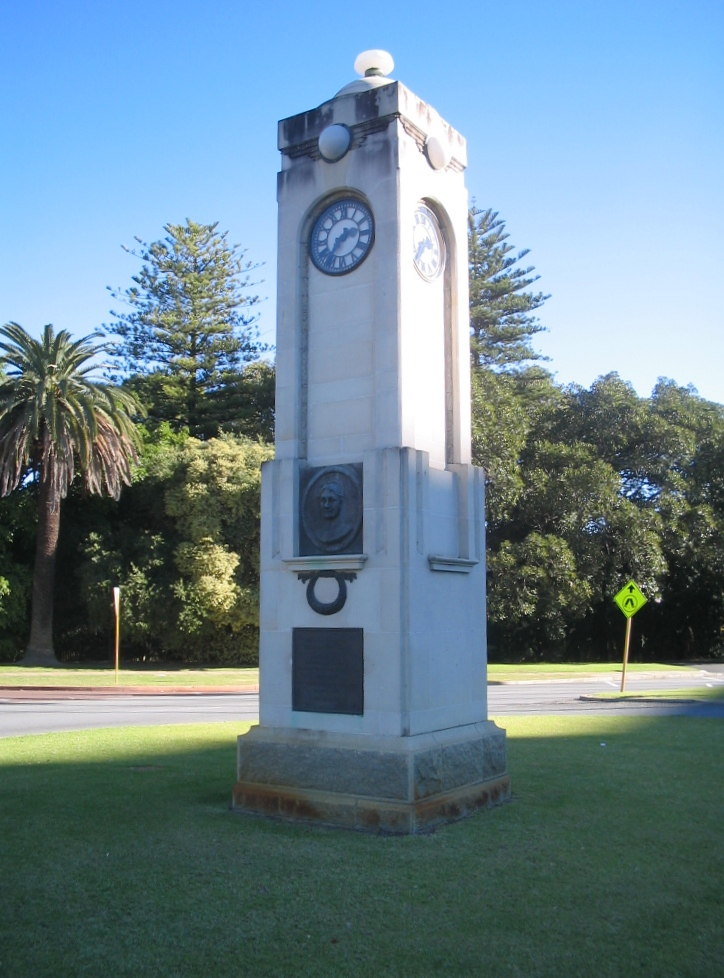
- Edith Dircksey Cowan Memorial on Kings Park Road at the entrance to Kings Park

General information
- Type: Road
- Length: 1.1 km (0.7 mi)

Major junctions
- East end: Malcolm Street; Fraser Avenue (Tourist Drive 200)
- West end: Bagot Road; Thomas Street (State Route 61)

Location(s)
- Major suburbs: West Perth

Kings Park Road is situated in West Perth, a suburb of Perth, the capital of Western Australia. It was once known as Brooking Street, and runs as a boundary between the suburbs of West Perth and Kings Park, from the west end of Malcolm Street to the corner of Bagot Road, Subiaco, and Thomas Street, West Perth.

Bitumenised in the 1930s, a 7.6-metre (25 ft) setback rule was suggested in 1939 by the Perth City Council. The junction with Thomas Street and Bagot Road has been modified several times; the junction at the eastern end was regularly called the King's Park Circus. The central median strip had been lined with trees, but they were removed and replaced with rose bushes sometime after May 1949.

== Edith Dircksey Cowan Memorial ==
The Edith Dircksey Cowan Memorial to Edith Cowan, the first female member of an Australian Parliament, stands on the roundabout at the junction of Kings Park Road, Malcolm Street and Fraser Avenue in West Perth. Before the 1950s, this place used to be the intersection of Kings Park Road, Fraser Avenue, and Mount Street. However, with the construction of the Mitchell Freeway, Mount Street was cut, and the barracks were demolished. Only the Barracks Arch remains, and Malcolm Street was created instead.

Following the death of Edith Cowan in June 1932, a committee was formed to create a memorial to her. The committee initially wanted the memorial to be within Kings Park but the Kings Park Board refused to allow the memorial, saying that she was not a person of national significance.

The committee became aware of the Perth City Council's plans for a memorial on the Kings Park Road Circus, and when approached they agreed with the memorial being designed by Harold Boas and Henry Attwell, featuring a bronze relief designed by Margaret Johnson, with a wreath of gum leaves and nuts. This alternative location of the memorial was also of concern at the time.

== Intersections ==
LGA	Location	km	mi	Destinations	Notes
Perth	West Perth	0	0.0	Malcolm Street / Fraser Avenue (Tourist Drive 200)	Modified traffic circle (Malcolm Street and Kings Park Road free-flowing, Fraser Avenue has give way); Kings Park Road continues west as Malcolm Street
Perth	West Perth	0.2	0.12	Havelock Street	Stop sign controlled, giving Kings Park Road priority
Perth	West Perth	0.4	0.25	Colin Street	Stop sign controlled, giving Kings Park Road priority; intersection co-located with Jorang Grove intersection
Perth	West Perth	0.4	0.25	Jorang Grove	Jorang Grove is left-in/left-out; intersection co-located with Colin Street intersection
Perth	West Perth	0.55	0.34	Altona Street	Stop sign controlled, giving Kings Park Road priority
Perth	West Perth	0.65	0.40	Outram Street / Kulunga Grove	Stop sign controlled on Outram Street side, giving Kings Park Road priority; uncontrolled on Kulunga Grove side
Perth	West Perth	0.75	0.47	Ventnor Avenue	Stop sign controlled, giving Kings Park Road priority
Perth	West Perth	0.85	0.53	Walker Avenue	Stop sign controlled, giving Kings Park Road priority
Perth - Subiaco boundary	West Perth - Subiaco boundary	1.1	0.68	Bagot Road / Thomas Street (State Route 61)	Traffic light controlled; no right turn from Thomas Street southbound to Bagot Road or Bagot Road to Thomas Street southbound
1.000 mi = 1.609 km; 1.000 km = 0.621 mi: Incomplete access
