= List of streets and paths in Kings Park =

Kings Park, Western Australia is a mixture of approximately one-third grassed parkland and botanical gardens, and two-thirds native bushland. Several streets provide vehicular access to the grassed area and gardens, and a network of pedestrian and shared use paths go through the bushland.

Kings Park is bounded by:

- Kings Park Road to the north
- Thomas Street to the north-west
- Winthrop Avenue to the west
- Mounts Bay Road to the south
- Mounts Bay Road (approximately), Bellevue Terrace, Cliff Street to the west

Streets in Kings Park
Name	Date built	Name source	Other name(s)	Notes	Image
Forrest Drive	1932 10 Feb	John Forrest		"In memory of the late Lord (Sir John) Forrest" Not to be confused with Forrest Avenue in East Perth	
Fraser Avenue	1932 10 Feb	Malcolm Fraser		"(Kings Park): Sir Malcolm Fraser, Commissioner of Lands and later the first Agent-General for Western Australia in London." Charles Fraser, first Colonial Botanist and Superintendent of the Botanic Garden in New South Wales "(Kings Park): Sir Malcolm Fraser (1834-1900). He replaced John Septimus Roe as Surveyor-General of Western Australia in 1870. Later Commissioner of Lands then the first Agent-General for Western Australia in London." "The founder of the (King's) park" The road used to go through to Lovekin Drive and now ends in Fraser Circle.	
Jorang Grove					
Kattidj Close					
Kulunga Grove					
Lovekin Drive	1932 10 Feb	Arthur Lovekin		Lovekin Drive, named in 1931, commemorates Arthur Lovekin, second President of the Kings Park Board and the man responsible for the initiation of the Honour Avenues. After World War II many requests for trees were received for dedication to servicemen who died in that war and the Kings Park Board asked the Returned and Services League to arrange a dedication ceremony for the remaining 300 sugar gums (Eucalyptus cladocalyx) in Lovekin Avenue. Lovekin Drive was dedicated on 5 December 1948.	
May Drive	1901 c 23 July			May Drive was opened on 23 July 1901 by Princess May, Duchess of Cornwall and York, later Queen Mary. May Drive became the first Honour Avenue in Kings Park and Botanic Garden in 1919.	
Park Avenue			Park Road, The Park Drive		
Poole Avenue	1932 10 Feb				
Saw Avenue	by 1838				
Wadjuk Way		Wadjuk Noongar		Custodians of land Wadjuk Noongar used Kings park as a sacred meeting place.	

Paths in Kings Park
Name	Date built	Name source	Other name(s)	Notes	Image
Aberdare Path					
Baird Path					
Boodja Gnarning Walk				Separates into the Maarm Track (Men's long walk) and Yorgra Track (Women's short walk)	
Boomerang Path					
Broadwalk Vista	1960s				
Bushland Nature Trail				Boardwalk	
Cliff Walk			Hacketts Path		
Crawley Path				Runs between the Pines Carpark and the Crawley Steps leading to Mounts Bay Road.	
Double Track					
Dryandra Track					
Goanna Path					
Goshawk Track					
Hacketts Path					
Hakea Track					
Honeyeater Path					
Hopbush Track					
Jacksonia Path					
Kokoda Track Memorial Walk				The Kokoda Track Memorial Walk is a tribute to the bravery of Australian troops who fought in the Papua New Guinea campaign of July 1942 to January 1943. The Kokoda Walk begins at Kennedy Fountain on Mounts Bay Road with a steep climb of 150 steps that ascends a height of 62 metres (203 ft).	
Law Walk		Robert Law		Law Walk is Kings Park's premier urban bushland trail. It is a 2.5-kilometre (1.6-mile) loop walk that begins at Rotunda Two and continues along the ridge of the limestone escarpment to Dryandra Lookout. A loop in the trail then leads to the Lotterywest Federation Walkway and back to the start of Law Walk, taking visitors approximately 45 minutes to complete.	
Lotterywest Federation Walkway	Opened August 2003				
Magpie Path					
Marri Walk					
Monash Track					
Nuytsia Track					
Poole Track					
Prionotes Path					
Serventy Path					
Speargrass Path	by 1838				
Wattle Track					
Wattlebird Track					
Western Path					
Woolly Bush Path		Woolybush Track			
Wren Path	by 1838				
Zamia Path	by 1836			Zamia trees	

== See also ==
- Kings Park, Western Australia § Walks
