= History of the Jews in Perth =

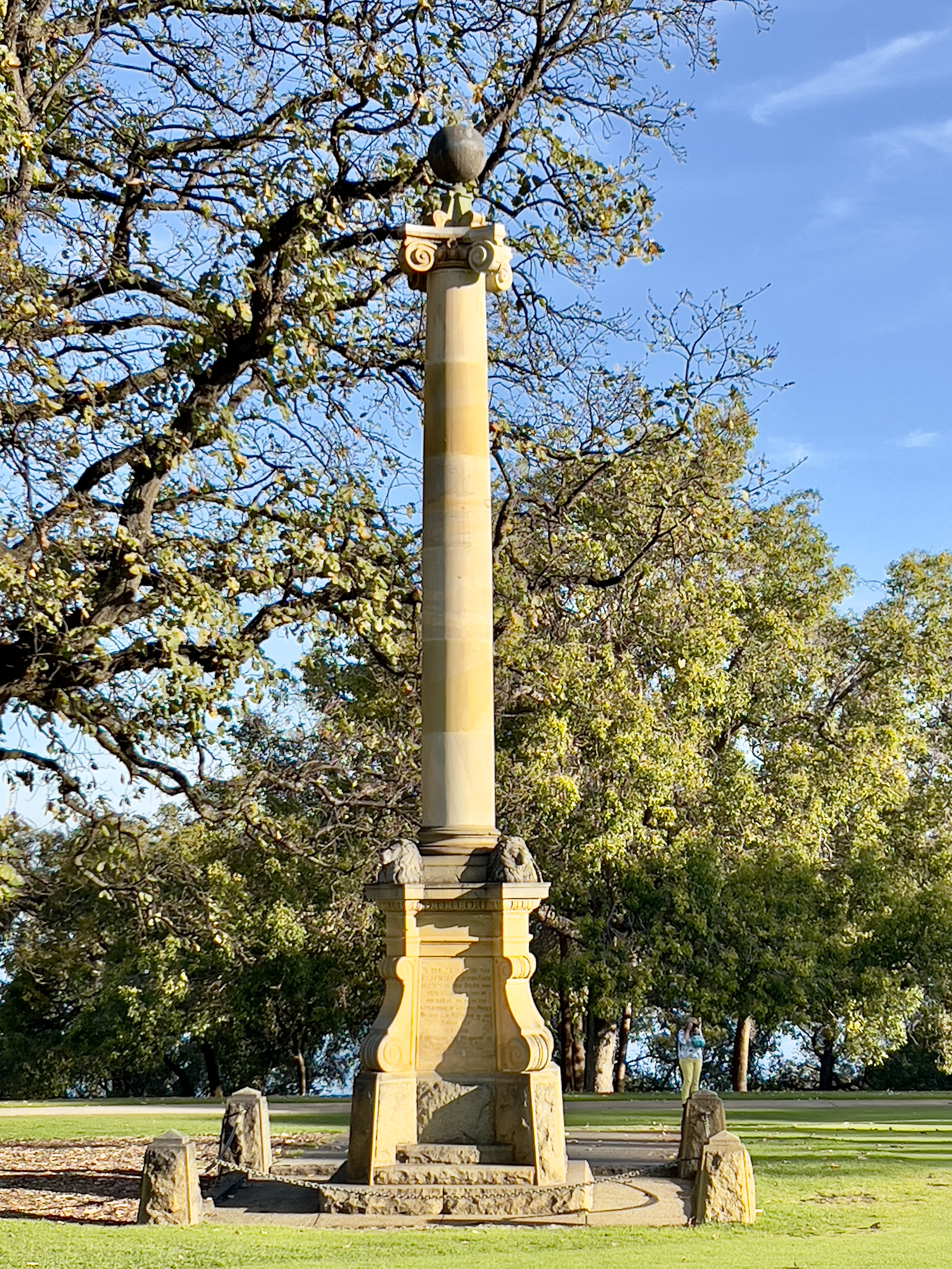
Jewish War Memorial in Kings Park, Perth, 2023

The history of the Jews in Perth, Australia dates back to 1829, shortly after Western Australia's admittance as a British colony. The community primarily descends from English-Jewish settlers and convicts, immigrants from Eastern Europe and the Levant, and recent arrivals from South Africa. As of 2021, Perth's Jewish population numbers approximately 6,347 members, making it the third-largest Jewish community in Australia.

It is estimated that Perth hosts the world's most geographically isolated Jewish community; its nearest Jewish community is located in Adelaide, Australia, 2,832 kilometres to its east. As of 2025, the city hosts the world's most remote Chabad house.

== Beginnings, 1829–1886 ==
Perth's Jewish presence began with the arrival of Lionel Samson in 1829, the first recorded Jew in Western Australia. An English Jew of sizable wealth and status, Samson established himself as a wholesale grocer and one of the first wine and spirit merchants in the newly created Fremantle penal colony, approximately 19.2 kilometres southwest of Perth. A small number of Jews arrived over the following two decades, mostly convicts and members of Samson's own family. However, there are no records of efforts to establish a local synagogue or burial society during this time. The relative lack of Jewish settlers may be attributed to Perth's geographic isolation, as well as issues of famine and drought that plagued Western Australia during this period.

Small numbers of Jews continued to immigrate to Western Australia as the region stabilized throughout the mid-19th century. There existed a fairly large socioeconomic gap between wealthy, established, English-Jewish families, such as the Samsons, and other Jewish settlers, who were mostly small business-owners and of non-English heritage. Social conventions of the time likely prohibited the mixing of the two groups.

== Growth, 1887–1920 ==
It was not until the Western Australian gold rushes that Perth's Jewish community began to see significant growth. From 1887 until the 1920s, Perth saw an influx of Jewish immigrants, mostly from the German Empire, Tsarist Russia, and Safed, Ottoman Palestine. Immigrants were largely driven by the economic opportunity provided by the gold rushes, increasing antisemitism in Russia, and financial hardships in the Holy Land. Many Palestinian Jewish immigrants could not afford fares to larger cities such as Sydney and Melbourne, and intended to relocate to Western Australia temporarily until they acquired enough wealth to return to the Holy Land.

In contrast to the relatively assimilated Anglo-Jewry, Russian and Palestinian immigrants generally came from more orthodox and insular backgrounds. Their arrival sparked a rapid expansion of Jewish cultural and spiritual life in Perth, with the establishment of various institutions in the city and its surrounding areas. The Fremantle Hebrew congregation was formed in 1887, becoming Western Australia's first Jewish congregation. It was founded by established Jewish community members and recent Russian immigrants, who brought a Torah scroll and necessary materials for the ritual killing of poultry upon arrival. The congregation operated out of congregant Victor Mandelstam's home and a designated room in the local town hall, until it opened Fremantle Synagogue in 1902. Perth Hebrew Congregation was established in 1892 and opened its synagogue in 1897, becoming Western Australia's first standing synagogue; Reverend David Isaac Freedman was appointed its head rabbi that same year. Perth Hebrew Congregation absorbed the Fremantle congregation in 1908, a result of the city's rapid growth.

This period also marked the beginning of various Jewish organizations in the Perth area. The city's first Hebrew school opened in 1891, operating out of Henry Seeligson's home. The West Australian Zionist Association was founded in 1900 under the direction of Rabbi Freedman, and was Australian Jewry's first formal political Zionist organization. The Jewish Tennis Club, also headed by Freedman, was formed in 1912, becoming Perth's first Jewish sporting organization. A local Yiddish theatre was established in 1913 by M. Berenson, a recent immigrant from Palestine. Proceeds from productions were donated to Jewish communal institutions and financial aid for the Yishuv.

It is estimated that the Perth Jewish community grew from less than 100 members in 1890 to over 1,200 in 1901; by 1920, it numbered approximately 1,900. By 1911, it was the only Australian Jewish community outside Sydney and Melbourne to number over 1,000.

== Interwar period to post-WWII, 1921–1954 ==
From the 1920s to the mid-1950s, Perth's Jewish community faced a relative decline, primarily due to issues of intermarriage, assimilation, low birthrates, and emigration, particularly to Melbourne and—later—modern Israel. By 1921, some 26% of Jewish men in Western Australia had non-Jewish wives. Assimilation may be partially attributed to the White Australia policy, under which Jews and other minorities faced societal pressure to conform to the nation's Anglo-Protestant majority culture.

In an effort to combat these perceived threats, new Jewish communal organizations were formed in the city. Perth's first Jewish newspaper, the Westralian Judean, was founded in November 1924. In that same year, the West Australian Zionist Athletic Club was also created; in 1937, it merged with the Young Men's Hebrew Association to form the Maccabean Club. Such groups collaborated with other Jewish athletic clubs in Sydney and Melbourne to organize interstate sporting carnivals. Jewish scouting troops for boys and girls were also established during this period.

Perth saw several waves of Jewish immigration during the 1920s, particularly from Palestine and Poland. Palestinian Jews comprised approximately 39% of Jewish arrivals to Perth from 1921–1930, compared to 9% from 1881–1920. Polish-Jewish migrants were largely driven by antisemitic legislation in Poland and the United States' new immigration restrictions. These arrivals, however, significantly declined after Australia introduced a series of immigration restrictions and quotas in 1924 and 1928, respectively.

This period also saw the growth of Jewish communities in Perth's suburbs, particularly the developing Mount Lawley. Jews slowly began to migrate to these areas before World War I, and the 1920s saw increased growth.

In response to growing antisemitism and pro-Nazi sympathies in Australia after Hitler's rise to power, Perth's Jewish leadership established the Western Australian Council of Jewish Affairs in 1943. The Council was founded as an anti-defamation agency to dispel antisemitic messaging—particularly from the Australia First Movement—and was modeled after organizations such as Melbourne's Jewish Council to Combat Fascism and Anti-Semitism.

In 1954, Temple David opened as a Progressive alternative to Perth Hebrew Congregation.

== Late 20th century, 1955–1999 ==
In response to a perceived decline of the local Jewish community in recent decades, a call to establish Perth's first Jewish day school was published in 1955. The Seeligson Kindergarten was founded in February 1957, consisting of 17 students and operating within Perth Hebrew Congregation. Two years later, the Carmel School opened, hosting one class of eleven pupils in its first year. Successive classes were added each year until 1964, when it became the city's first Jewish primary school. Perth's first Jewish secondary school, the G. Korsunski-Carmel Jewish Day School, was founded in 1971.

In 1973, the Jewish Communal Centre opened in Yokine, consisting of a synagogue and youth center.

The Westralian Judean ceased publication in 1955. In its place, The Maccabean was founded in 1972; as of 2026, it continues to serve as Perth's weekly Jewish newspaper.

In the 1960s–1990s, Perth experienced waves of Jewish immigration from South Africa. These migration waves nearly doubled the city's Jewish population, from approximately 3,000 in 1981 to some 6,000 in 1991. As of 2011, it was estimated that some 28% of Perth's Jews were South African-born.

The 1980s–1990s also saw much of Perth Jewry relocate from Mount Lawley to the suburbs of Yokine, Menora, Dianella, Coolbinia, and Noranda, largely due to rising land costs.

== 21st century, 2000–present ==
Throughout the 21st century, Perth's Jewish community has continued to expand. Jewish immigrants have continued to settle in the city, primarily from South Africa, Israel, and the former Soviet Union. As of 2026, the city hosts offices of various Jewish organizations and charities, a Jewish nursing home, Western Australia Maccabi, a community Shaliach, and youth groups Habonim Dror and B'nei Akiva.

In 2002, local Jewish leadership constructed an eruv, encompassing sections of Yokine, Menora, Dianella, and Coolbinia.

In July 2004 and December 2010, Perth Hebrew Congregation was defaced with antisemitic graffiti.

== See also ==
- History of the Jews in Canberra
