= Menora, Western Australia =

Menora
- Suburb
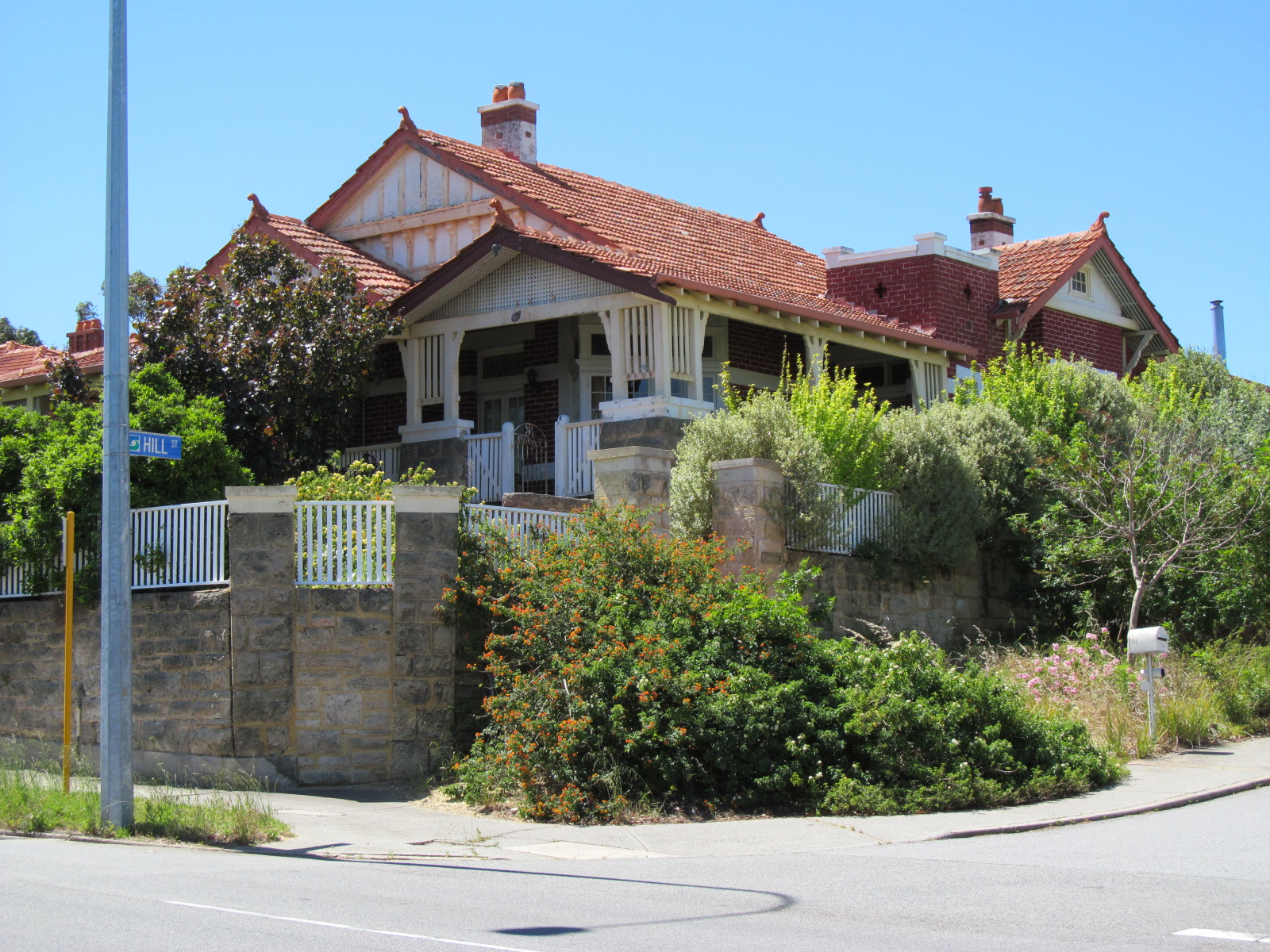
- Heritage listed house at 1 Hill Street, Menora
- Interactive map of Menora
- Coordinates: 31°55′08″S 115°51′44″E
- Country: Australia
- State: Western Australia
- City: Perth
- LGA: City of Stirling
- Location: 5 km (3.1 mi) N of Perth CBD

Government
  - State electorate: Mount Lawley
  - Federal division: Perth

Area
  - Total: 1.2 km^{2} (0.46 sq mi)

Population
  - Total: 2,691 (SAL 2021)
- Postcode: 6050
Suburbs around Menora
Tuart Hill	Yokine
North Perth	Menora	Inglewood
	Mount Lawley	Dianella

Menora is a suburb of Perth, Western Australia. Its local government area is the City of Stirling.

In 1954, with the establishment of official suburban boundaries, the new offshoot from Mount Lawley was named Menora in honour of an old theatre of that name which was located within its borders. Further support for the name was provided by the local Jewish community for whom the Menorah holds special significance. From an aerial point of view, a section of the roads are shaped like the Menorah.

Menora is home to a large Jewish community (8.2%), the heart of which is the Perth Hebrew Congregation. It is close to the Carmel Jewish School, JHub Maccabi Community Centre and other Kosher facilities such as the Kosher Food Centre in Menora and the Kosher Besh Fresh cafe. Jewish worshipers from the Reform/Progressive tradition, are served by Temple David in nearby Mount Lawley.

In the 2021 census, Menora had a median age of 57 (as compared with 38 for Australia), children aged 0–14 years made up 12.6% and 41.2% of its population were over 65 years of age. This is likely attributable to a high concentration of retirement villages in the district.
