= Hampton Buildings =

Heritage building in Fremantle, Western Australia

Coordinates: 32°03′33.3″S 115°45′6.1″E

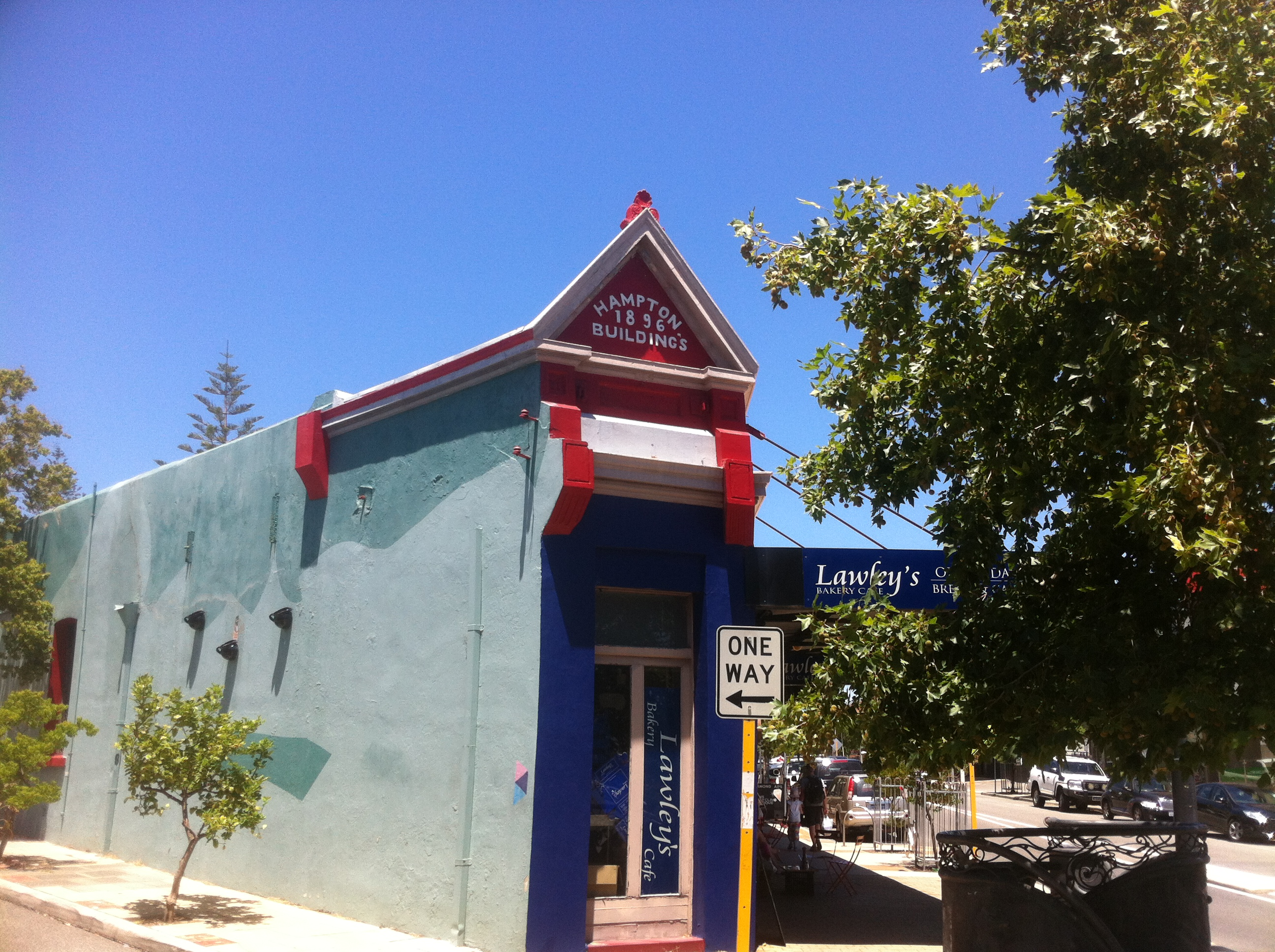
- Hampton Buildings in 2016
- Interactive map of the Hampton Buildings area

General information
- Location: 2–8 Wray Avenue, Fremantle, Western Australia
- Construction started: 1896
- Completed: 1896

Height
- Architectural: Victorian Georgian

Hampton Buildings is a heritage listed building located at 2–8 Wray Avenue on the corner of South Terrace in Fremantle, Western Australia. It was one of many commercial buildings constructed in Fremantle during the gold boom period in the late nineteenth and early twentieth century.

== Description ==
The structure is set on a triangular block with the corner facing South Terrace and the main frontage facing Wray Avenue. It is a single storey rendered masonry and iron commercial building in Victoria Georgian style that originally contained four separate shops. The walls are constructed of rendered masonry with a decorative rendered masonry parapet on the roof line. The parapet wall has a gable facing South Terrace with the inscription "Hampton Buildings 1896" inscribed with stucco. Each of the four shop fronts has a large timber framed window facing the street but the internal walls have been removed between the first three shops creating one long interlinked space with the last shop remaining separate.

== See also ==
- List of heritage places in Fremantle
