= William Mills (businessman) =

Australian businessman and biscuit manufacturer (1866–1916)

William Mills (22 June 1866 – 8 October 1916) was a Western Australian businessman, co-founder of the biscuit manufacturer Mills and Ware.

== Early life ==
Mills was born in Liverpool, England, on 22 June 1866. He was the son of Joseph Mills, and apprenticed as a baker. After completing his apprenticeship, he travelled to Australia by working as a ship's baker. Both his parents had died by this time. He arrived in Melbourne, Victoria in 1887, where he got married, and remained for about eight or nine years.

== Western Australian goldfields ==
Mills came to Western Australia c. 1896. He joined the gold rush around Kalgoorlie, where he worked as a baker, and likely earned more from that profession than from prospecting. While in the goldfields, Mills met Henry Ware who had also migrated from England, and may have been his school friend. Ware worked in the mines until health problems soon forced him to return to Perth. Mills also returned to Perth by 1897.

== Business ==
Mills opened a bakery and patisserie shop in 1897, initially in Broome Road, Subiaco, and then in Fremantle Road, Cottesloe from 1898. His wife would sell cakes and biscuits door-to-door. By 1899, Mills bought a hand-operated biscuit-making machine, which increased their productivity so much that a larger building was required. They moved to South Fremantle, and Mills formed a partnership with Henry Ware, who provided financial support but was a "silent partner". They operated the Swan Cake and Biscuit Factory, and the business was known as Mills and Ware.

Ware died in 1904, and Mills bought out his portion of the business, obtaining full control of the business.

== Personal life and other interests ==
Mills married a daughter of Joseph Lee of London, England, and they had three sons.

While at Cottesloe, Mills was a member of the first elected roads board, and retaining the seat for three years. He was a delegate to the first roads boards conference held at Bunbury, Western Australia. He resigned when he moved to Fremantle in 1901. He represented the ratepayers for the South Ward on the Fremantle Council for five years until his resignation at the end of 1906. He then stood for East Fremantle Council's Central Ward, and was elected. He resigned after five years to focus on his business.

Mills was chairman of the board of Fremantle Public Hospital, a Past Master of the Masonic fraternity, a member of the Chamber of Commerce, the Western Australian Chamber of Manufactures, the Fremantle Golf Club, the Commercial Travellers' Association, the East Fremantle Rifle Club, and also the East Fremantle Bowling Club, where he was the first president.

Mills died on 8 October 1916. His funeral was held the next day, and he was buried in Fremantle Cemetery's Church of England section.

Mills was recognised as one of the most influential Western Australian businesspeople in The West Australian's 2013 list of the 100 most influential.
