= Yokine, Western Australia =

Yokine
- Suburb
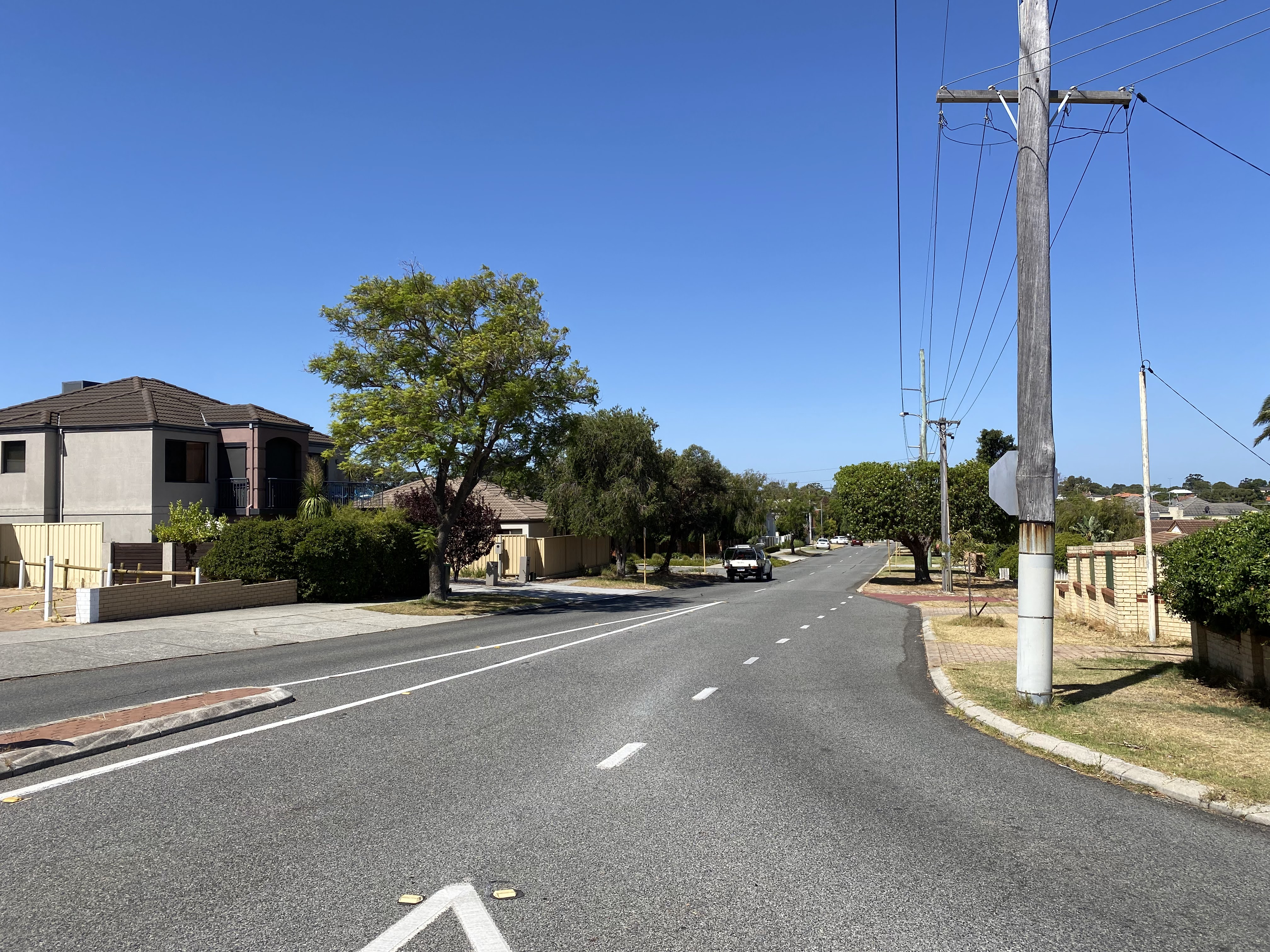
- McDonald Street
- Interactive map of Yokine
- Coordinates: 31.9001°S 115.851°E
- Country: Australia
- State: Western Australia
- City: Perth
- LGA: City of Stirling
- Location: 7 km (4.3 mi) N of Perth CBD

Government
  - State electorate: Mount Lawley
  - Federal division: Perth

Area
  - Total: 4.9 km^{2} (1.9 sq mi)

Population
  - Total: 12,706 (SAL 2021)
- Postcode: 6060
Suburbs around Yokine
Balcatta	Nollamara	Dianella
Tuart Hill	Yokine	Dianella
Joondanna and Coolbinia	Menora	Inglewood

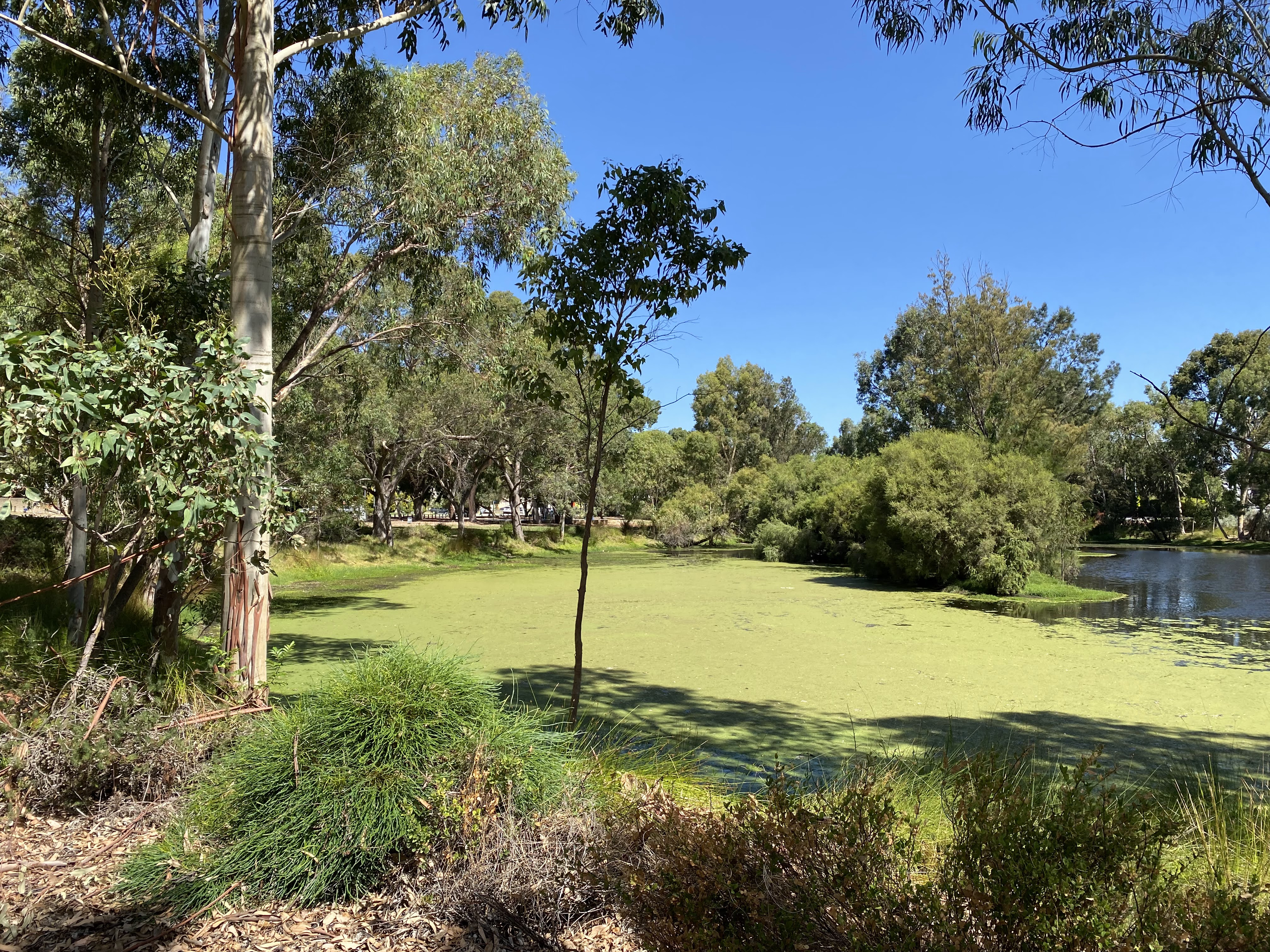
Dog Swamp Reserve

Yokine is a suburb of Perth, Western Australia. Its local government area is the City of Stirling.

The area is also home to a number of key Jewish organisations, such as Carmel School, a Jewish Day School and JHub Maccabi Community Centre, a Jewish Community Centre. It is also situated close to Perth Hebrew Congregation in neighbouring Menora.

== History ==
The name Yokine was derived from a Nyungar language word meaning "dingo" (which early settlers referred to as the "native dog"). The name was chosen because the area is close to Dog Swamp. Its post code is 6060.

Yokine was part of the grant originally allocated to T. R. C. Walters in 1840. Western Australian Golf Limited owned Yokine from at least 1927 and subdivided a small portion of land near the golf course. Before World War II the only house in Yokine was at the eastern end of Royal Street. Yokine experienced a housing boom after the war and much of the area near the golf course was developed by the early 1950s. The southern area grew rapidly in the 1960s and by the late 1970s Yokine was almost completely developed.

== Facilities ==
Yokine is home to the Western Australian Golf Club, Yokine Bowling Club, Coolbinia-West Perth Cricket Club, Maccabi Soccer Club, Dianella Soccer Club, Coolbinia Amateur Football Club and the Coolbinia Bombers Junior Football Club. The Dianella Soccer Club, bowling, cricket and football clubs are located at Yokine Regional Open Space, a very large open space at the suburb's southern border, comprising four large grassed areas and two children's playgrounds. Pathways surrounding the reserve are used by walkers and runners, including a regular Parkrun group.

=== Education ===
Yokine Primary School was opened in 1959 on Woodrow Avenue in the centre of Yokine. Carmel School, a Jewish day school, operates both a primary and senior high school adjacent to the Yokine Primary School. Its primary school opened in Yokine in 1962, with the high school commencing in the 1970s.

=== JHub Maccabi Community Centre ===
JHub Maccabi Community Centre was first established on its present site on Woodrow Avenue in 1952. It serves as Jewish Community Centre to Perth and Western Australia's Jewish communities.

=== Shopping ===
Dog Swamp Shopping Centre

Dog Swamp Shopping Centre is a major shopping centre, located in Yokine.

The shopping centre was first opened in 1967. Prior to being taken over by the Westpac Diversified Property Trust, the centre was owned by the Foodland Associated Limited Property Trust.

Flinders Square Shopping Centre

Flinders Square Shopping Centre is a shopping centre located in Yokine, adjacent to Dog Swamp Shopping Centre. It was owned by Vicinity Centres, and was sold to Colliers International in 2018.

== Transport ==
The suburb is served by a number of Transperth bus routes operated by Swan Transit and Path Transit. The 354, 370 (limited stop) and 970 (Mirrabooka-Yokine and Mirrabooka-Perth) covers Flinders Street, while the 384 (Mirrabooka-Perth), 385/386 (Marangaroo-Perth), 387 and 388 (Warwick-Perth) and the 389 (Wanneroo-Perth) cover Wanneroo Road, and route 19 covers the inner part of Yokine via Blythe Avenue.
