= Mills and Ware =

Mills and Ware Limited
- Industry: Food
- Founded: 1898
- Founder: William Mills; Henry Ware
- Headquarters: Fremantle, Western Australia, Australia
- Products: Biscuits; Cakes

Mills and Ware Limited was the largest supplier of biscuits and cakes in Western Australia. It was founded by William Mills and Henry Ware.

== History ==
In 1898, Mills and Wares was established in Cottesloe and shortly afterwards (1899) moved to a new factory in South Terrace, South Fremantle. The factory was the largest industrial employer of women in Western Australia. When the factory closed on 20 March 1992 90% of the workforce were women and 75% were born overseas.

Arnott's Biscuits became a shareholder in Mills and Ware in 1953 and the company was renamed Arnott's Mills and Ware Limited. In October 1973 Arnott's became the majority shareholder and in 1991 announced that the factory would close in 1992.
