= History of the Jews in Canberra =

The history of the Jews in Canberra, Australia, dates to the 1930s, with an established community forming in the late 1940s. The Jewish community has continued to expand and develop with new congregations, institutions, and community groups.

== History ==
=== Origins and early development (1930s–1950s) ===
The history of the Canberra Jewish community is understood within the context of the general history of Canberra in its gradual development as the nation's capital. The Jewish community's evolution can be partly be traced in demographic patterns using the Australian census. In terms of its early growth, prior to the formation of Jewish community institutions, very few Jewish people lived in the nation's capital. In 1933, three Jews were reported to live in Canberra. The first known Jewish burial in Canberra was in 1942. The deceased being Georg Hans Fröhlich, a Dunera internee who was released to work at the Mt Stromlo Observatory.

Gradually, the community grew and institutions were established. The first Canberra Jewish community group formed in 1949. The group soon was formally constituted (in 1951) and incorporated (in 1953). Over the subsequent decades, the community strove to establish Jewish life through its development and provision of Jewish education opportunities, the formation of youth groups and women's organisations. The growth of the community is partly evident in later census figures which showed that by the 1980s over four hundred Jews lived in the ACT. The ACT Jewish community is also reflective of its distinctive nature, being situated in the Australian capital. Many community members are public servants, professionals, academics, students, and businesspeople. Other aspects of local Jewish life may be understood in terms of religious issues and the community's responses, the portrayal of Canberra Jewish life in the Australian Jewish press, and the Canberra Jewish community's relationship to the Israeli embassy.

One of the founders of the Canberra Jewish community was Earle Hoffman OAM (1921-2013) who continued to play a formative role in the community. In 1984, Hoffman founded of the ACT branch of the Australian Jewish Historical Society. Hoffman also served on the board of the Executive Council of Australian Jewry (ECAJ) for 25 years.

=== Community growth (1950s–1980s) ===
In 1971, the Jewish community in Canberra opened the National Jewish Memorial Centre. The founding of the centre attracted support from Jewish individuals and organisations across Australia. The centre later received continuing support from the Jewish Communal Appeal (JCA) of New South Wales.

In the 1980s, the community was headed by Ruth Holzman who would later head the federal Australian Zionist Federation.

In the mid-1980’s, the ACT Christian Jewish Dialogue group was founded by George Stern, a member of the ACT Jewish community, and Ray Brown, a Roman Catholic layman.

=== Later development ===
In 2009, Chabad of ACT was founded. In February 2011, the ACT Jewish community marked the inauguration of Mikvah Chaya Mushka as the establishment of the first purpose-built ritual bath in the Australian Capital Territory constructed by Chabad of ACT. The mikvah was established to provide local access to essential Jewish practices, and supporting the religious sustainability of the community. That same year, Professor Kim Rubenstein, a prominent legal scholar and a professor at the University of Canberra was elected to serve as community leader for the ACT Jewish community. Rubenstein would later run for parliament in the 2022 federal election. In 2014, the ACT Jewish community marked a milestone in its first permanent rabbinical appointment. In 2015, a Zionist Federation chapter is established in ACT. In 2017, the Chabad of Canberra completed writing of a Torah scroll, an achievement marked by celebration at Parliament followed by a public procession. In 2020, Canberra's first Jewish primary school officially opened for students from Kindergarten through Year 6 in an effort to further secure the long-term viability of Jewish religious life in the Australian capital.

== Arts and culture ==
Arts in the Jewish community of ACT include the a small museum and art gallary in the main Jewish centre. Other cultural events include local participation in the International Jewish Film Festival. Other social and cultural events have been run in partnership with Sydney-based organisations such as the Jewish Communal Appeal (JCA) and Shalom Collective. Chanukah celebrations in the community have featured participation of political figures and diplomats.

In 2025, the community approved the building of a Holocaust museum on the premises of the community centre.

== Antisemitism ==
Antisemitic incidents affecting the community include violence targeting of synagogues, childcares, the homes of religious leaders, verbal and online harassment, as well as the distribution of antisemitic literature in residential letterboxes.

Violent attacks targeting the National Jewish Memorial Centre in Canberra include firebombings in 2000 and 2001. The 2000 attack occurred in October during the Jewish holiday of Sukkot. An April 2001 attack involved the use of Molotov cocktailcausing damage to the sanctuary's Bimah. A major incident in August 2001 involved a group of around five attackers who firebombed the centre during a community event attended by around 120 members. At least five firebombs were used in the attack. Community members reported that ACT police took approximately thirty minutes to arrive on the scene. Coverage of these attacks in the mainstream Australian press was limited.

A 2014 study on antisemitism in schools in the ACT found that the issue was a major challenge for Jewish children and teenagers within Canberra schools. The study examined the specific nature of these incidents, their triggers, and their impact on young people. The study also evaluated how students, parents, and the broader Jewish community respond to such incidents. The researchers drew on qualitative data from focus groups with Jewish students and their families and found that antisemitic encounters are widespread, affecting nearly all participants. The research highlighted a critical need for enhanced anti-racism initiatives that specifically incorporated targeted educational interventions on antisemitism.

The Jewish centre in Canberra was evacuated during the Bondi Beach shooting, Australia's worst antisemitic attack. The evacuation was a precaution and patrols around the facility were set up during the 2025-2026 summer. In response to the attack, the community organised a memorial event featuring a menorah lighting.

== Religious pluralism ==
The ACT Jewish community hosts both Orthodox and Progressive congregations at the community centre.

== See also ==
- History of the Jews in Perth, Australia
