= Fremantle Technical School =

Building in Fremantle, Western Australia

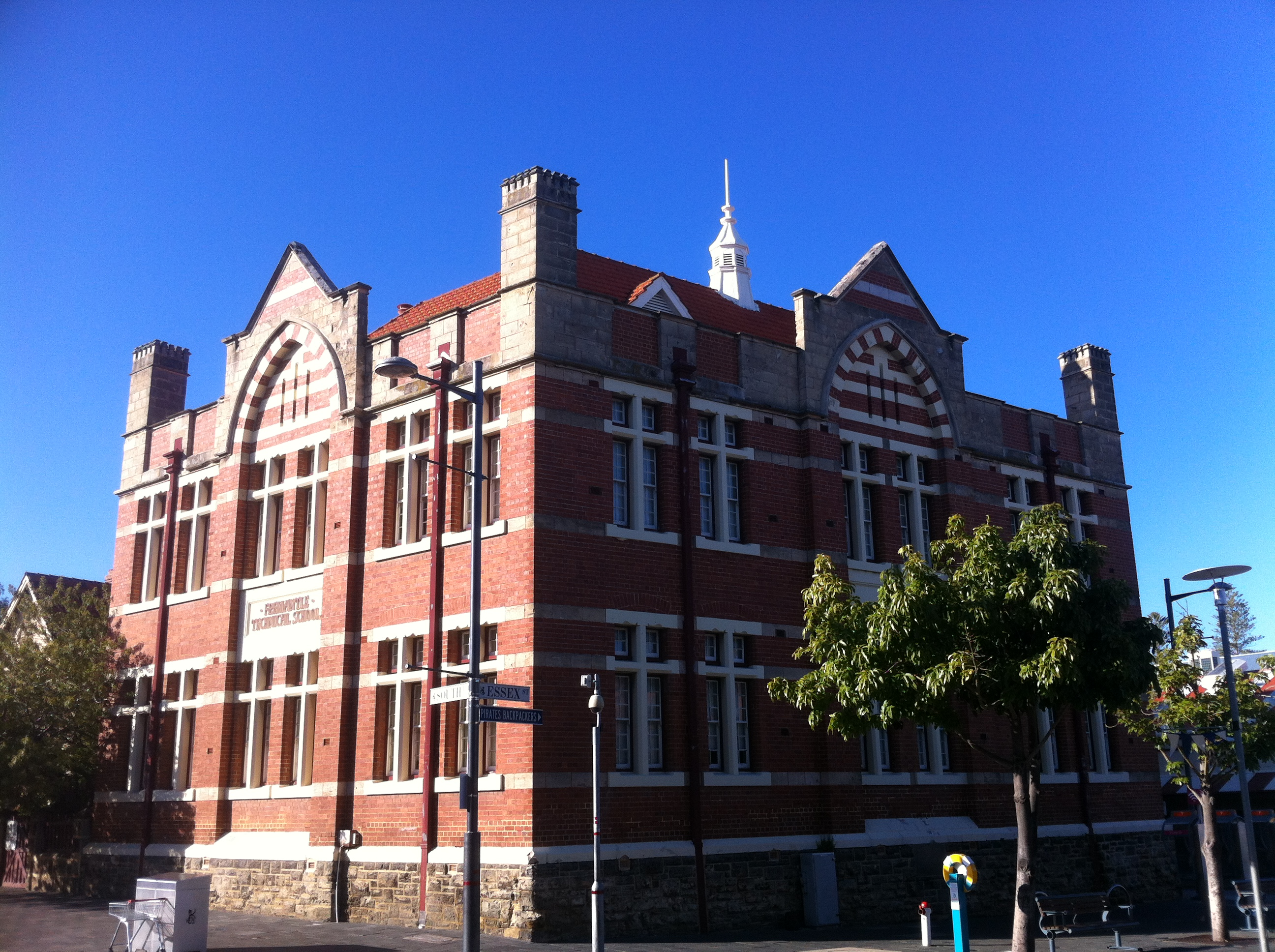
- Fremantle Technical School

General information
- Type: Heritage-listed building
- Location: Fremantle, Western Australia
- Coordinates: 32.05645°S 115.74859°E

Western Australia Heritage Register
- Type: State Registered Place
- Designated: 1 October 2002
- Reference no.: 1007

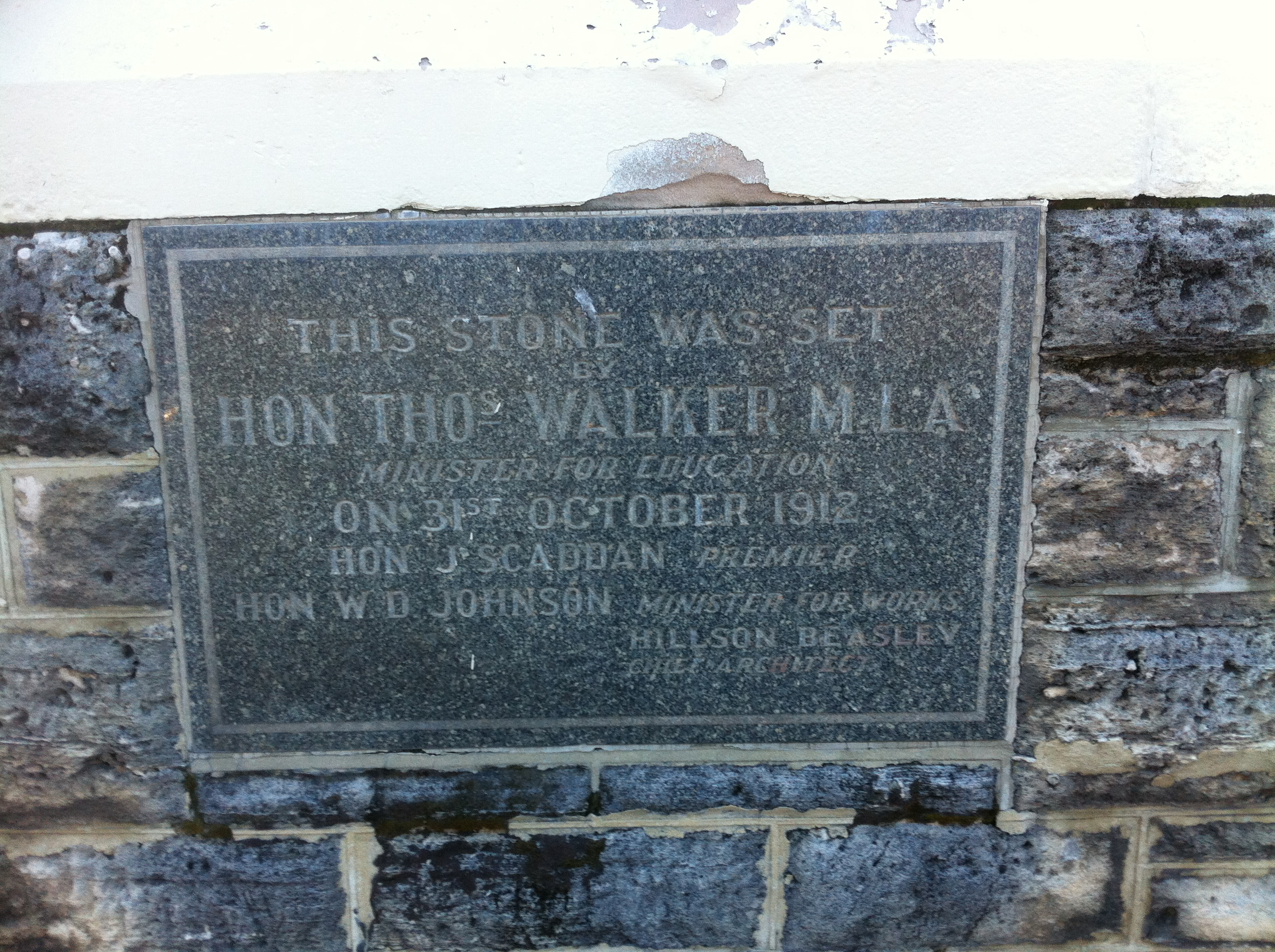
Fremantle Technical School, foundation stone

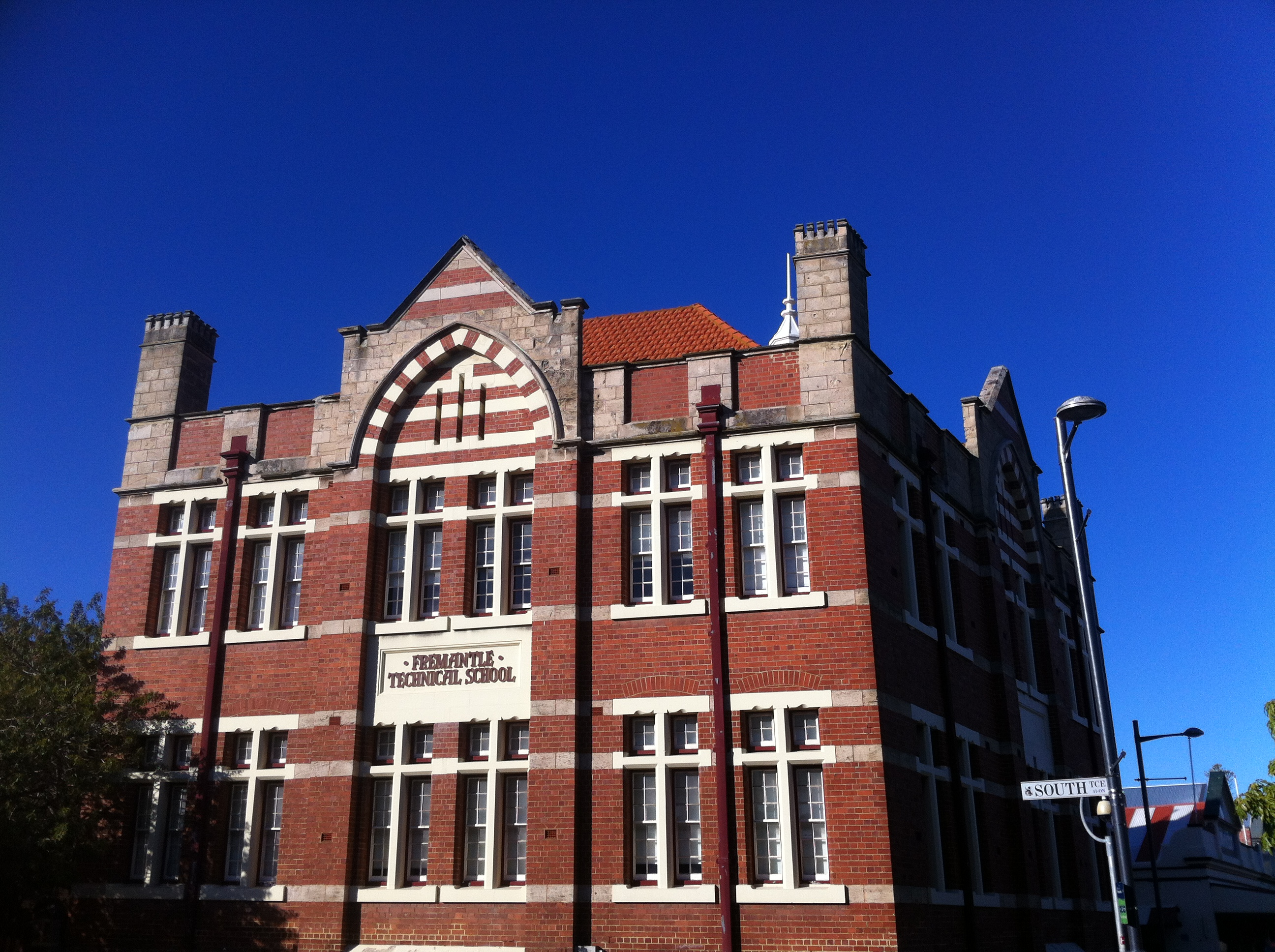
South Terrace frontage of school

The Fremantle Technical School building, also known as the Fremantle Technical College building, is a two-storey building of red brick construction located at the corner of South Terrace and Essex Street in Fremantle.

The building adjoins the single storey former Infants and Girls School, which was built from 1877 to 1878; a small forecourt is formed by the recessed central bay former Infants and Girls School and the technical school building, which terminates the north end of the site.

The public school was later transformed into a technical school, in 1902.

Hillson Beasley, the chief architect of the Public Works Department of Western Australia, approved the plans for the Fremantle Technical School on 20 July 1912.

Planned as the western wing of the old school, the building was estimated to cost £A 5,000, equivalent to A$686,200 in 2022. It has 82 metres (270 ft) of frontage along South Terrace and was made from brick with a local limestone base. It features a Donnybrook plinth and facings, and a roof of Marseilles tiling. Designed to have ten new classrooms each to hold 30 students it provided access to the first floor via a wide stairway opening onto a large landing. Each floor had five classroom with the rooms on the ground floor surrounding a large open hall space.

The foundation stone was laid by the then Minister for Education, Thomas Walker, on 31 October 1912.

The brick and tile building was built in the Federation Free Style with banded stucco and stone.

The official opening of the building was held on 16 July 1913, although classes had been held in some classrooms prior to the event. It was opened by Thomas Walker together with the Mayor of Fremantle, Frederick James McLaren, in attendance.

== See also ==
- List of heritage places in Fremantle
