= Fremantle Hospital =

Hospital in Perth, Western Australia (opened 1897)

- Department of Health
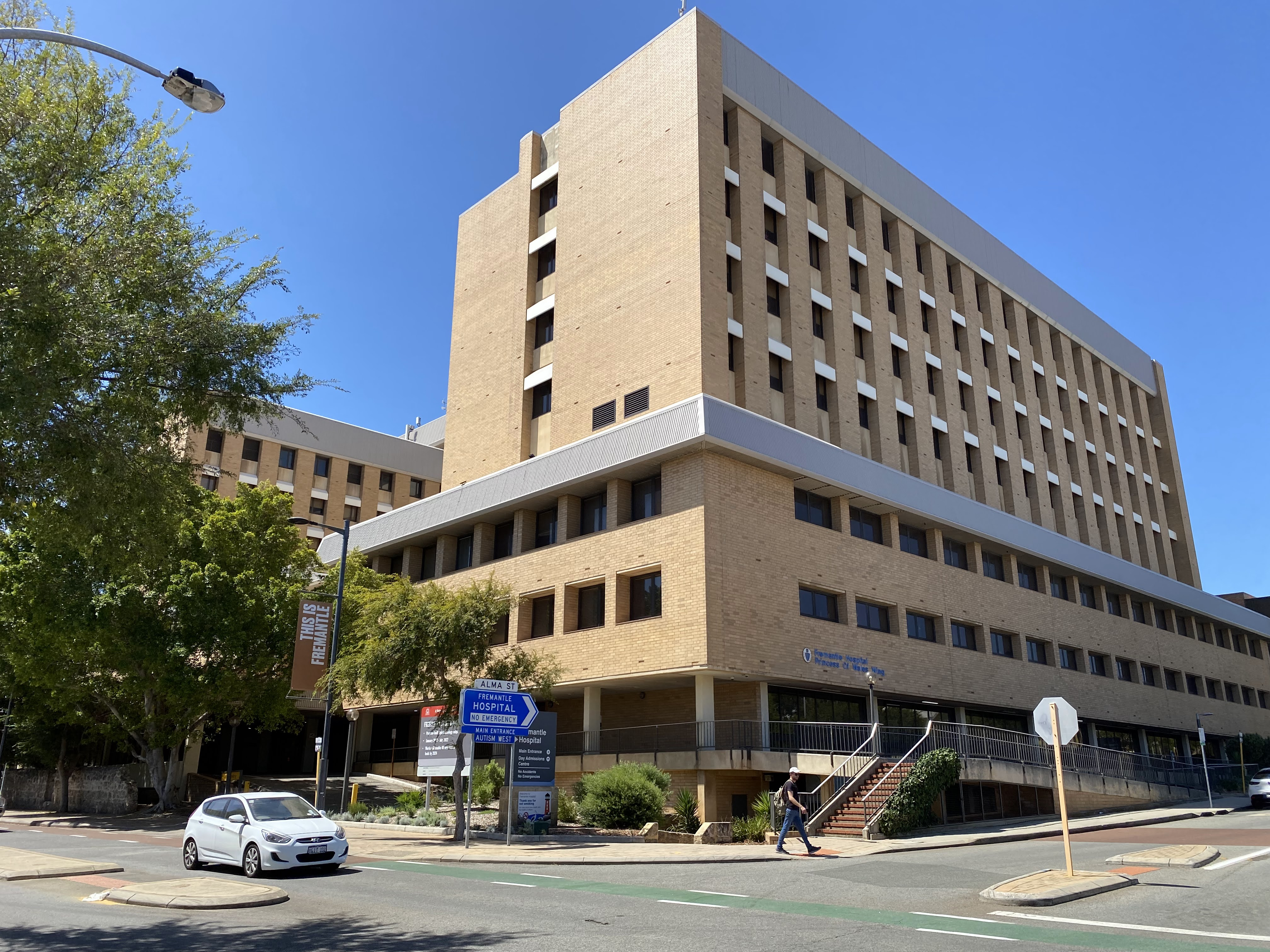

Geography
- Location: South Terrace, Fremantle, City of Fremantle, Western Australia, Australia
- Coordinates: 32°03′31″S 115°45′06″E

Organisation
- Care system: Public Medicare (AU)
- Type: Teaching

Services
- Emergency department: No (closed 3 Feb 2015)

History
- Opened: 1897; 129 years ago

Links
- Website: www.fhhs.health.wa.gov.au
- Lists: Hospitals in Australia

Fremantle Hospital is an Australian public hospital situated on South Terrace in central Fremantle, a suburb of Perth, Western Australia. It was formerly the major hospital in its region; however, with the opening of Fiona Stanley Hospital in Murdoch on 3 February 2015 it was substantially downsized, with the closure of its emergency department and a range of other services being relocated to the new hospital.

== Location ==
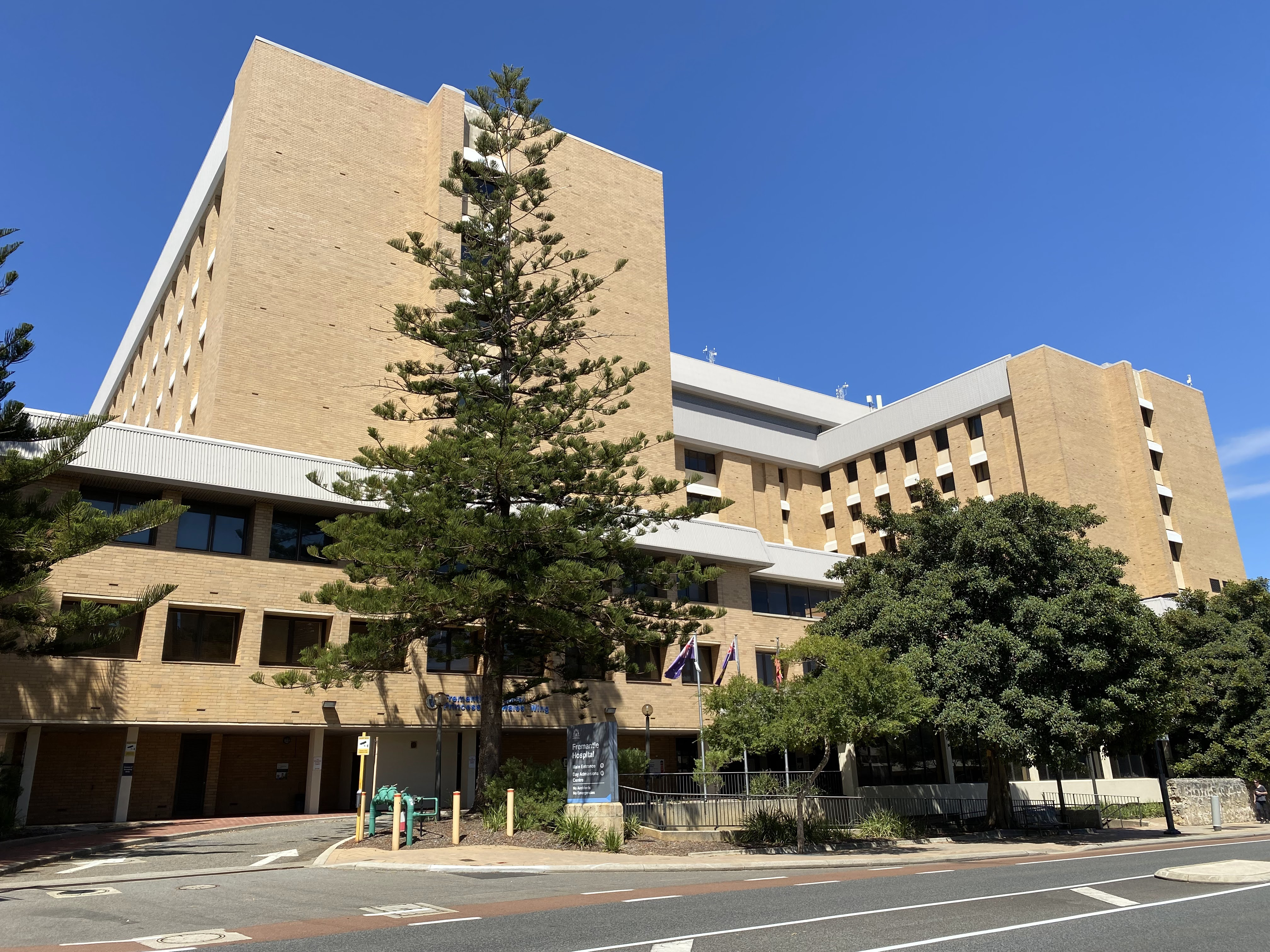
Fremantle Hospital

The main facility of Fremantle hospital is a historic site and looks out over the nearby fishing boat harbour, the Port of Fremantle and the Indian Ocean. The western side is bounded by South Terrace, while Hampton Road is on its eastern side. The hospital is also within walking distance of the Fremantle Markets, and Fremantle Oval.

== History ==
Fremantle Public Hospital opened in 1897 with 52 beds. The building itself was originally a private residence called The Knowle, built in 1856 with both stone and labour from Fremantle Prison. Two further wards and an operating theatre were added in 1900. Subsequent additions included the Ron Doig Block in 1934, the William Wauhop Wing in 1960, and the Princess of Wales Wing in 1976.

Prior to the opening of Fiona Stanley Hospital, Fremantle Hospital and Health Service provided 575 beds across all campuses, which included Rottnest Island Nursing Post and Kayeela Hospital in East Fremantle. Facilities included 24-hour acute care, emergency department, a paediatric ward, a 66-bed psychiatric and psychogeriatric service. The Hyperbaric Medicine unit has provided support services for divers in all of Western Australia and clinical services to residents mainly from the immediate area for over 20 years.

With the opening of Fiona Stanley Hospital, Fremantle Hospital has become a 300-bed hospital focused on services such as mental health, aged care, secondary rehabilitation, palliative care, and planned surgeries. The Kaleeya campus was closed, with the land sold in December 2014; the Rottnest Island Nursing Post was made an external campus of Fiona Stanley Hospital.

== See also ==
- List of hospitals in Western Australia
- List of hospitals in Australia
