= Tuart Hill, Western Australia =

Coordinates: 31°53′53″S 115°50′02″E

Tuart Hill
- Suburb
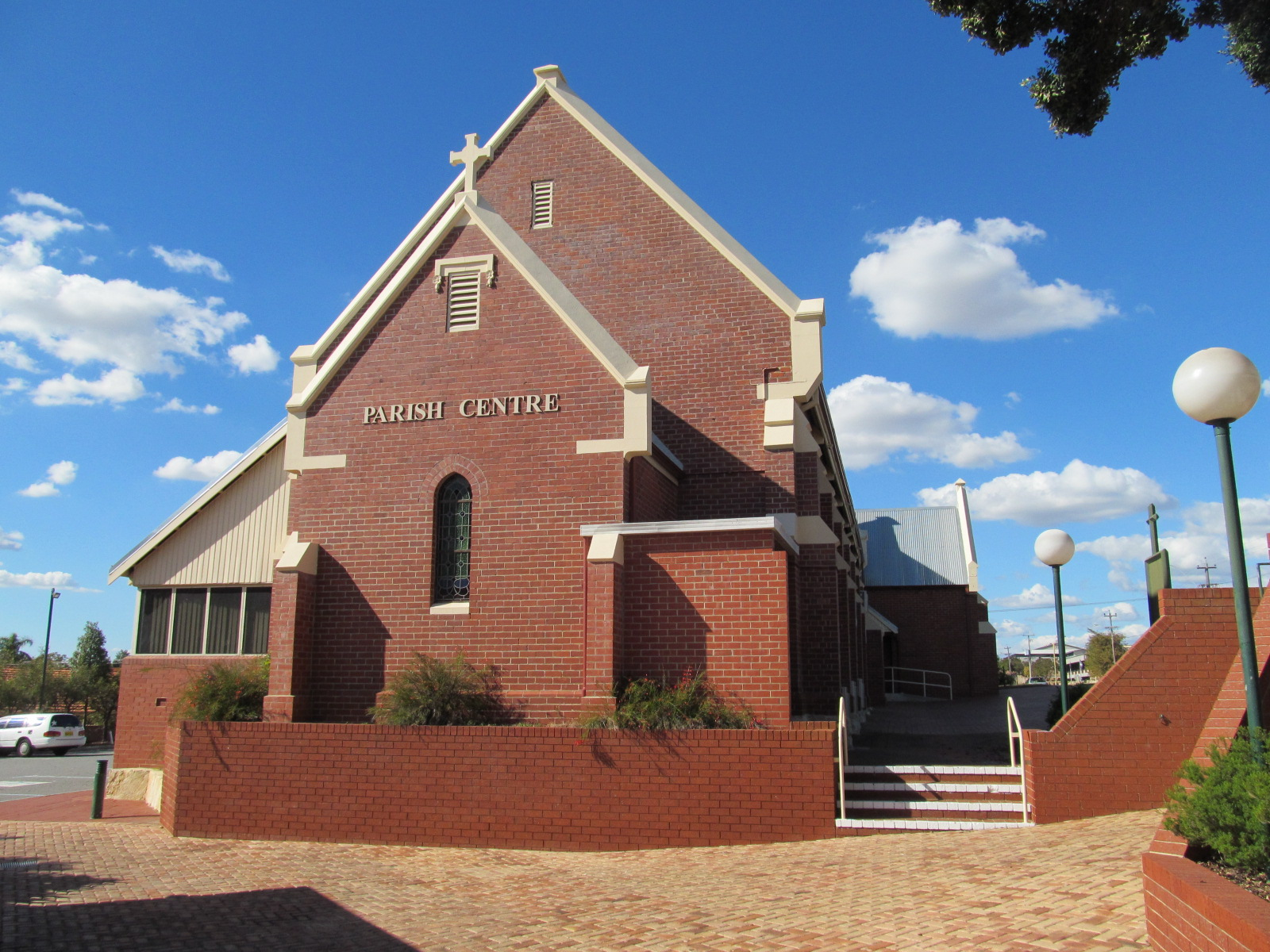
- St Kieran Catholic Church, Tuart Hill
- Interactive map of Tuart Hill
- Country: Australia
- State: Western Australia
- City: Perth
- LGA: City of Stirling
- Location: 8 km (5.0 mi) N of Perth CBD
- Established: 1950s

Government
  - State electorate: Balcatta
  - Federal division: Perth

Area
  - Total: 2.11 km^{2} (0.81 sq mi)

Population
  - Total: 7,541 (SAL 2021)
- Postcode: 6060
Suburbs around Tuart Hill
Westminster	Yokine
Tuart Hill	Morley
Joondanna	Menora

Tuart Hill is a suburb of Perth, Western Australia, that is approximately 9km North slightly North-East from the Perth CBD.

Tuart Hill is named after the tuart tree that once grew extensively throughout the area, especially around Dog Swamp. In 1914 the suburb name of Grenville was proposed as a name for the suburb by the Grenville Progress Association, but not accepted due to its likeness to Granville in New South Wales.

== Events ==
Since 1914, the Osborne Park Agricultural Society holds its annual show at Robinson Reserve in Tuart Hill. The show is held around the last weekend in November on Friday and Saturday and features displays of local produce, animals and livestock, carnival attractions and fireworks.

== Facilities ==
Tuart Hill has two large active recreation reserves: Grenville Reserve and Robinson Reserve. Grenville Reserve is a large cricket and football oval with facilities includes Council tennis courts, playground, cricket nets and centre wicket, change rooms, club rooms and public toilets. The ground is used by the Tuart Hill Cricket Club during summer months and various users during winter. Robinson Reserve similarly hosts cricket during summer with the Osborne Park Cricket Club being located at the reserve, since 1919. Robinson Reserve is adjacent to the Osborne Library and Community Centre.

The City of Stirling's Osborne Community Hub is located in Tuart Hill, near the intersection of Royal st and Main st, a popular shopping and dining strip. The Osborne Community Hub includes the Osborne Stirling Library and Community Centre.

== Schools ==
There are two primary schools in Tuart Hill, the public Tuart Hill Primary School and the private St Kieran Catholic Primary School. Tuart Hill Primary School is heritage listed, having opened in 1910 as the Grenville State School. Servite College, a Catholic high school, is the only high school in Tuart Hill. Tuart Hill Senior High School once existed but was closed in the early 1980s to become Tuart College, a senior college run by the Western Australian Education Department, offering a number of courses such as a year 12 TEE program for students wanting to enter tertiary education, adult learning classes, or English language courses.

== Transport ==
=== Bus ===
- 402 Perth Busport to Stirling Station – serves Main Street
- 403 Perth Busport to Stirling Station – serves Stoneham Street, York Street and Royal Street
- 404 Perth Busport to Osborne Park – serves Stoneham Street, York Street, Swan Street and Waterloo Street
- 414 Glendalough Station to Stirling Station – serves Main Street
- 998 Fremantle Station to Fremantle Station (limited stops) – CircleRoute clockwise, serves Morley Drive
- 999 Fremantle Station to Fremantle Station (limited stops) – CircleRoute anti-clockwise, serves Morley Drive

Bus routes serving Wanneroo Road:

- 384 Perth Busport to Mirrabooka Bus Station
- 385 Perth Busport to Kingsway City (limited stops)
- 386 Perth Busport to Kingsway City
- 387 and 388 Perth Busport to Warwick Station
- 389 Perth Busport to Wanneroo

== Notable residents ==
- Courtney Murphy - 2nd runner up of Australian Idol 2004
- Greg Egan - hard science fiction writer
