= Fremantle Synagogue =

Former synagogue in Fremantle, Western Australia

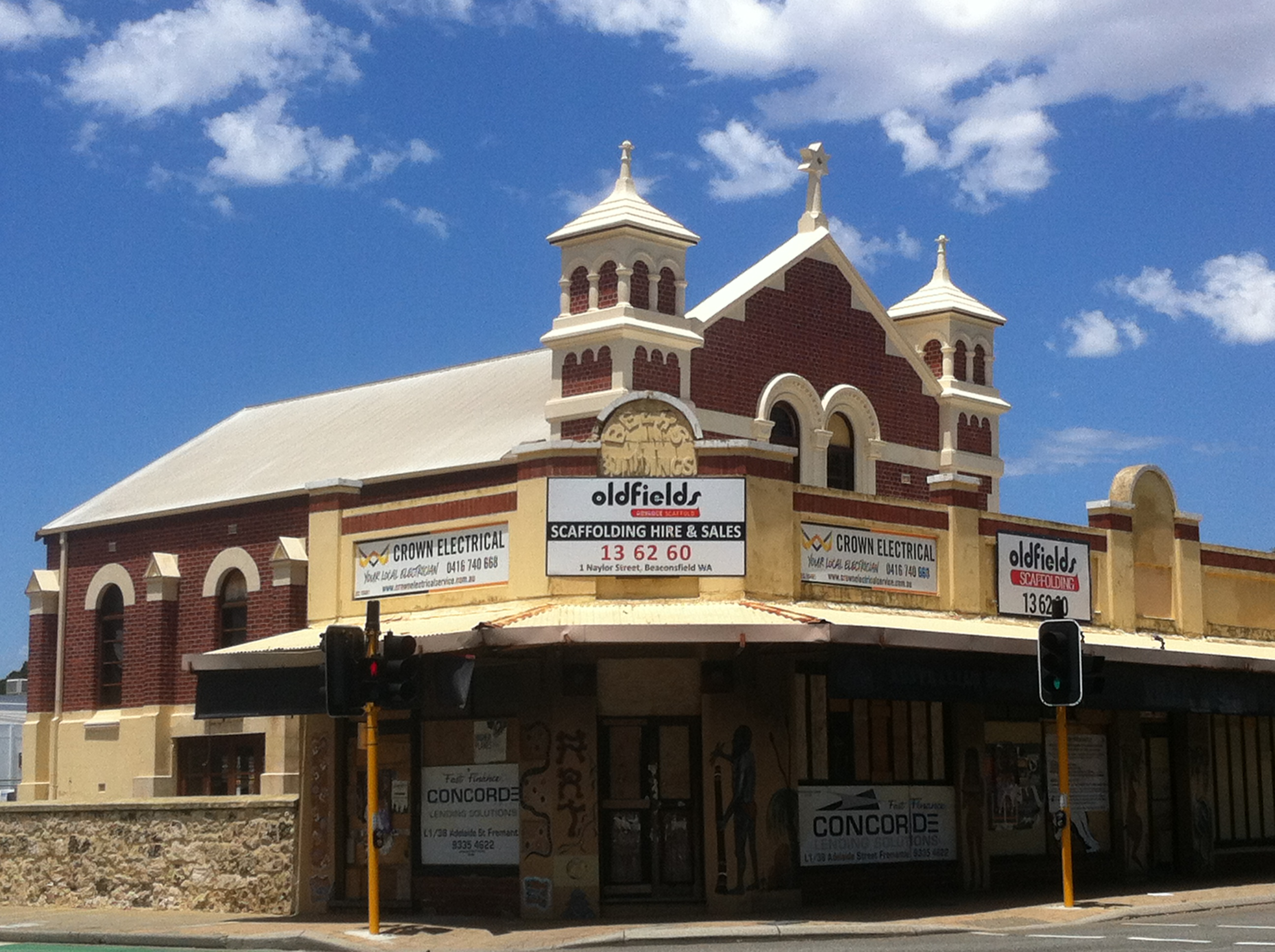
- The former synagogue

- Location in Perth, Western Australia

Religion
- Affiliation: Judaism (former)
- Ecclesiastical or organisational status: Synagogue (1902–1908); Retail stores (since 1924)
- Year consecrated: 1902
- Status: Closed (as a synagogue); Repurposed

Location
- Location: Fremantle, Western Australia
- Country: Australia
- Coordinates: 32°03′24.7″S 115°44′59.3″E

Architecture
- Architects: Oldham and Eales
- Type: Synagogue architecture
- Style: Romanesque Revival
- General contractor: J. McCracken
- Established: 1887 (as a congregation)
- Groundbreaking: 8 January 1902
- Completed: 1902; 124 years ago

Website

Western Australia Heritage Register
- Type: State Registered Place
- Designated: 16 November 1993
- Reference no.: 1010

The Fremantle Synagogue is a heritage-listed building located on South Terrace on the corner of Parry Street in Fremantle, Western Australia. It is the oldest extant synagogue building in Western Australia and was associated with Jewish community leaders and merchants in Fremantle at the end of the 19th century. The building is also known as Beers building.

== Use as a synagogue ==
Laurence Alexander, the manager of Falk and Company, was elected president of the first Jewish congregation established in Fremantle in August 1887. Henry Seeligson acted as lay reader, from September 1888 when weekly meetings were commenced in the barracks on South Terrace. Land was set aside for the purpose of building a synagogue in Fremantle in 1891. The current site was vested with Elias Solomon and W.F. Samson as trustees for the Jewish congregation in April 1896. A service with the Jewish Minister of Perth, Rabbi B. Freedman, was held at the synagogue site in 1897. Fundraising for the synagogue was being held with a building committee formed in 1900, with plans being approved and put out for tender. In 1901 the synagogue president was Charles Nathan and the honorary minister was Elias Cohen.

The building was designed by the architects Oldham and Eales, and built by J. McCracken. The foundation stone was laid on 8 January 1902 by Solomon, by then the Federal Member for Fremantle, a former mayor of Fremantle and a trustee of the congregation. The inscription on the stone reads:

Fremantle Hebrew Congregation. This stone was laid by E. Solomon, Esq., J.P., M.P.. on January 8, 1902. Teves 29th, 5662. C. S. Nathan, President. Oldham and Eales, architects.

The building was completed a few months later and a consecration service was held on 31 August 1902 led by the reader S. Miller who spoke

Open unto the one the gates of the righteousness; I will enter them and bless the Lord.

He then entered the synagogue followed by the wardens and proceeded to the ark reciting a prayer. They then circuited around the room three times chanting psalms, after which the Sefer Torah was placed in the ark and the perpetual lamp was lit. The remainder of the service was then held. The treasurer of the building fund, L. Alexander, then reported that the land had cost £1750, the building cost £850, making a total of £2600, on which there was a liability remaining of £500.

By 1908 services were no longer held in the building and in 1910 the majority of the state's Jewish population had moved to Perth, joining the Perth Hebrew Congregation, and the synagogue was closed permanently. Meetings among the community had been held in 1909, discussing the disposal of the property.

== Subsequent use ==
The building was sold in 1916 to the federal government for £A 850 as an annexe to the general hospital where it was converted into a ward. It was later acquired by William Beer in 1922 and by 1924 he was operating an auction mart from the site.

The Fremantle City Council acquired the building in 1969 and leased it for various commercial purposes including Barri's Rugs, a gallery, a clothing outlet named Skid Rose and various cafes. The Council sold the building in 2004.

== See also ==
- List of synagogues in Australia
- List of heritage places in Fremantle
