= Fremantle Markets =

Market in Fremantle, Western Australia

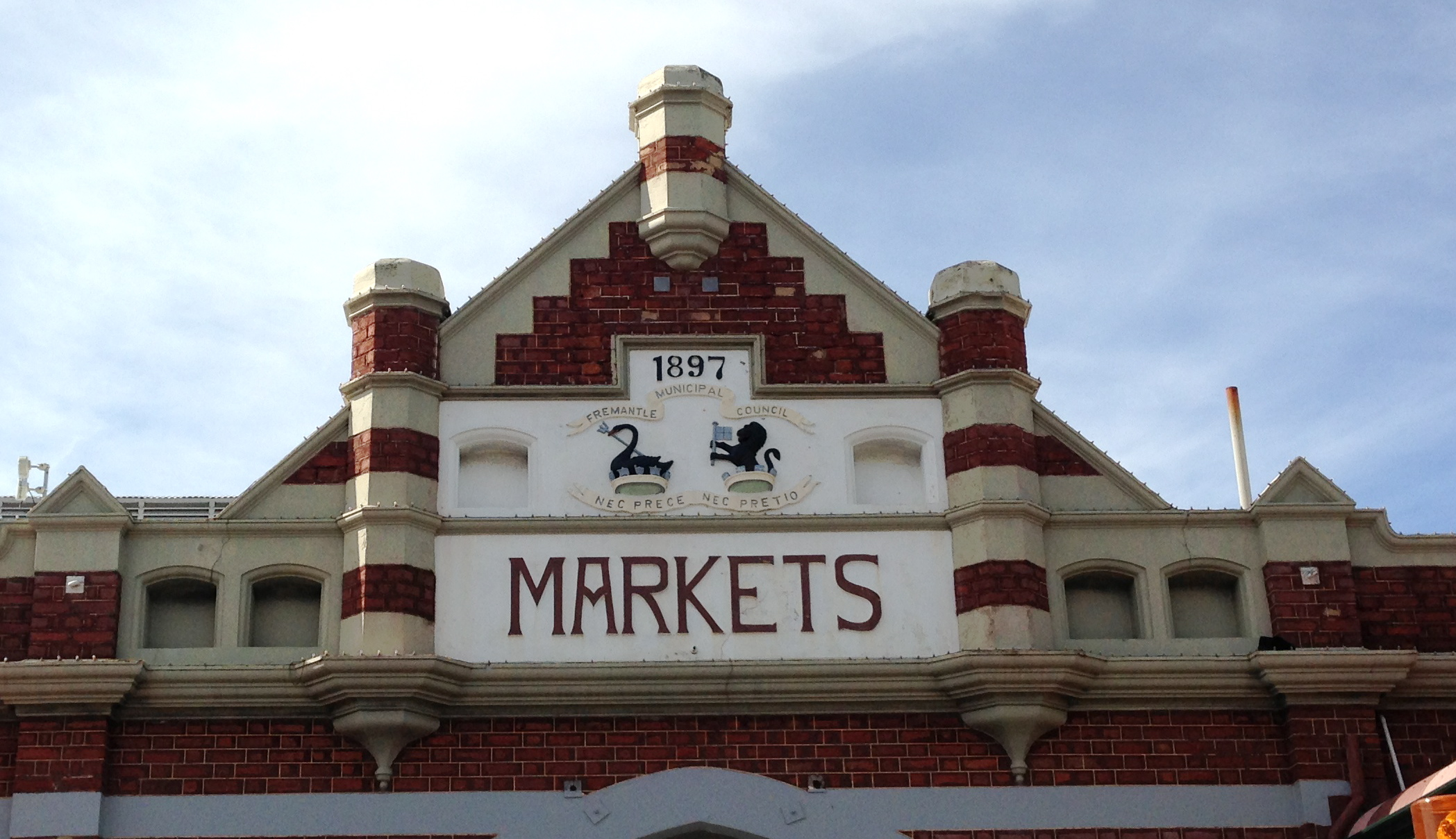
- Fremantle Markets roof sign
- Location: Fremantle, Western Australia
- Coordinates: 32°03′22″S 115°44′57″E
- Website: www.fremantlemarkets.com.au
- Building details

General information
- Type: Markets
- Construction started: 6 November 1897; 129 years ago
- Completed: June 1898; 128 years ago

Western Australia Heritage Register
- Type: State Registered Place
- Designated: 9 November 1993
- Reference no.: 1006

The Fremantle Markets is a public market located on the corner of South Terrace and Henderson Street, Fremantle, Western Australia.

Built in 1897, it houses over 150 shops for craftspeople, fashion designers, and merchants in the historic Hall, and fresh food producers, vegetable growers and food retailers in The Yard. It is open on Friday, Saturday, Sunday, as well as most public holidays and is a popular Fremantle tourist destination considered "a Fremantle institution".

== History ==
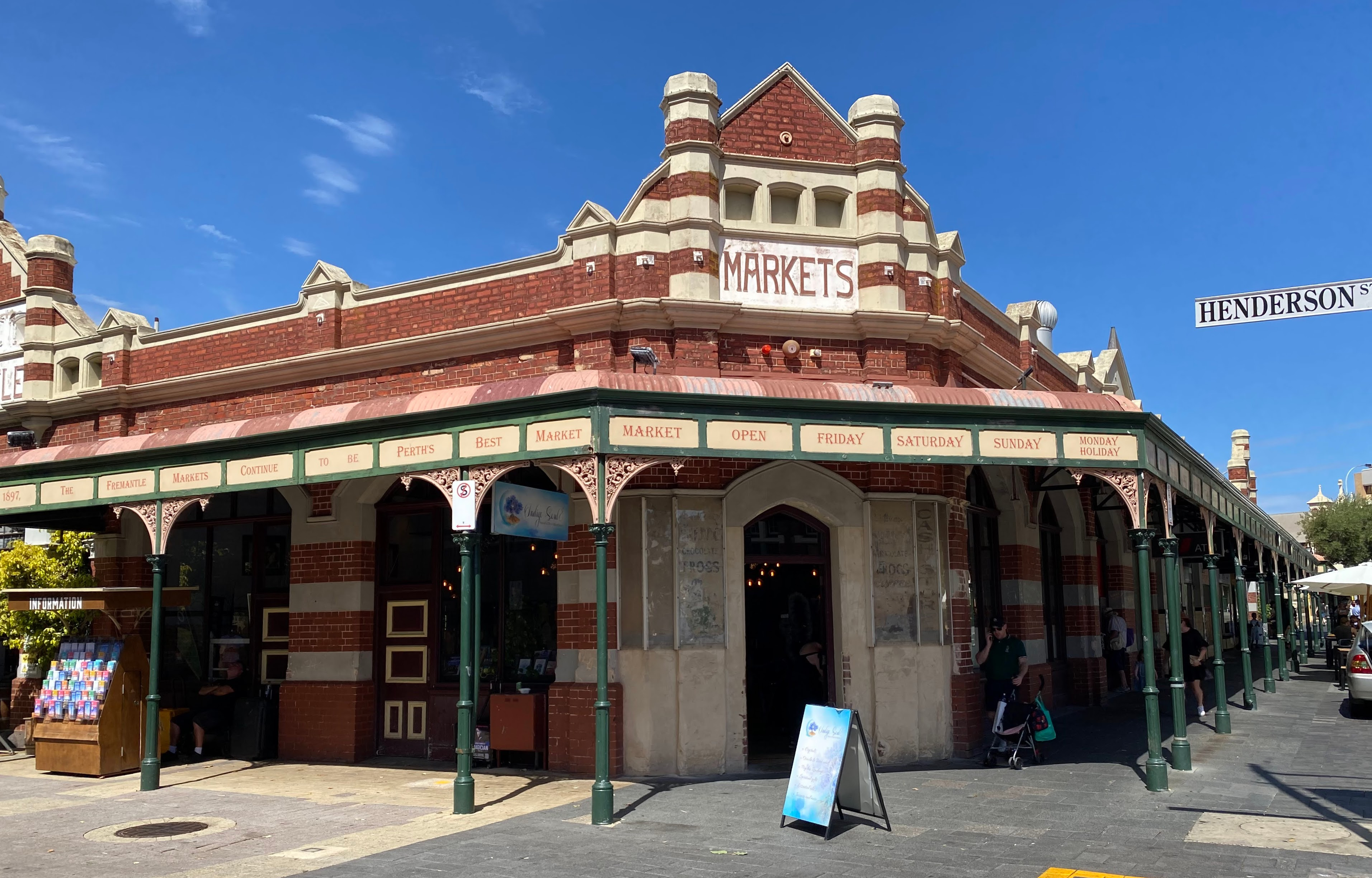
Fremantle Markets from South Terrace

Designed in the Federation Romanesque style, the architects were Joseph Herbert Eales and Charles Oldham. The foundation stone was laid by Premier of Western Australia Sir John Forrest on 6 November 1897, and the principal construction was carried out between 1898 and 1902 at a cost of £8,268, equivalent to A$1.3 million in 2022. The interior walls are mainly rough washed limestone, with a high iron roof supported by large jarrah columns. The perimeter of the markets is lined with small shops, and the main entry to the market is through ornate stone arches on the Henderson Street and Market Street frontages.

The buildings functioned as a wholesale food and produce market until the 1950s, when this was taken over by the Perth Metropolitan Markets on Wellington Street. The original verandahs were demolished, and the main body of the market buildings was used as a packing and distribution centre until the early 1970s. The buildings then sat vacant until they were restored by the Fremantle City Council in 1975 using funding from the National Estate grants program, and reopened on 31 October 1975. While the basic structure was retained, the internal layout was altered to accommodate permanent retail stalls, a bar was built in one corner, and the verandahs were replaced. An area known as Farmer's Lane was established to the north of the main market hall, which housed temporary fruit and vegetables stalls covered with tarpaulins and umbrellas. Part of this area was damaged by fire in May 1992, prompting the building of a new Fruit and Vegetable Hall using tin and timber recycled from the Leach Highway wool stores. This extension won a commendation from the Royal Australian Institute of Architects in 1993, and the Fremantle Markets were permanently entered on the Register of Heritage Places in November of that year.

== Gallery ==
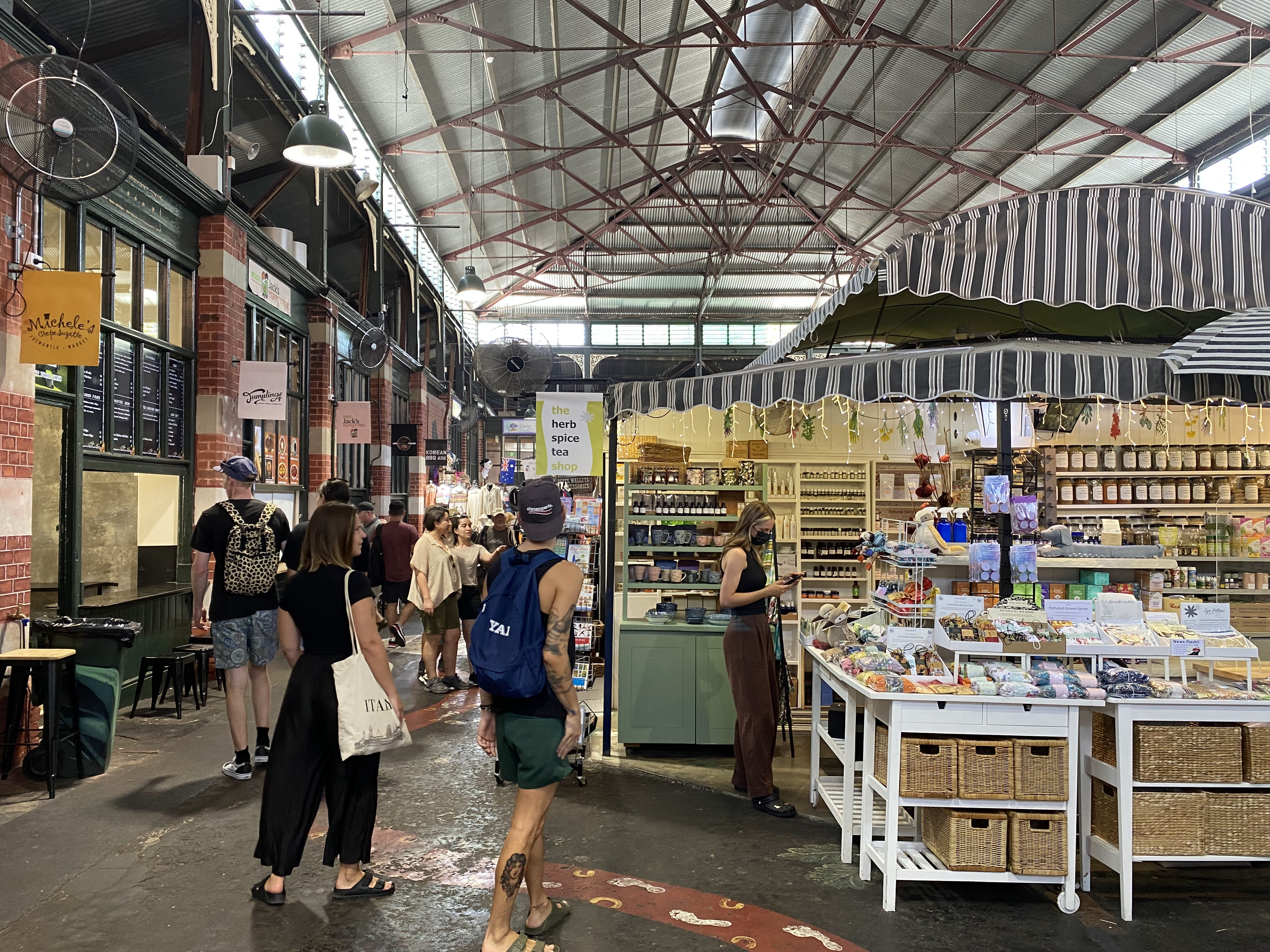
The main market hall

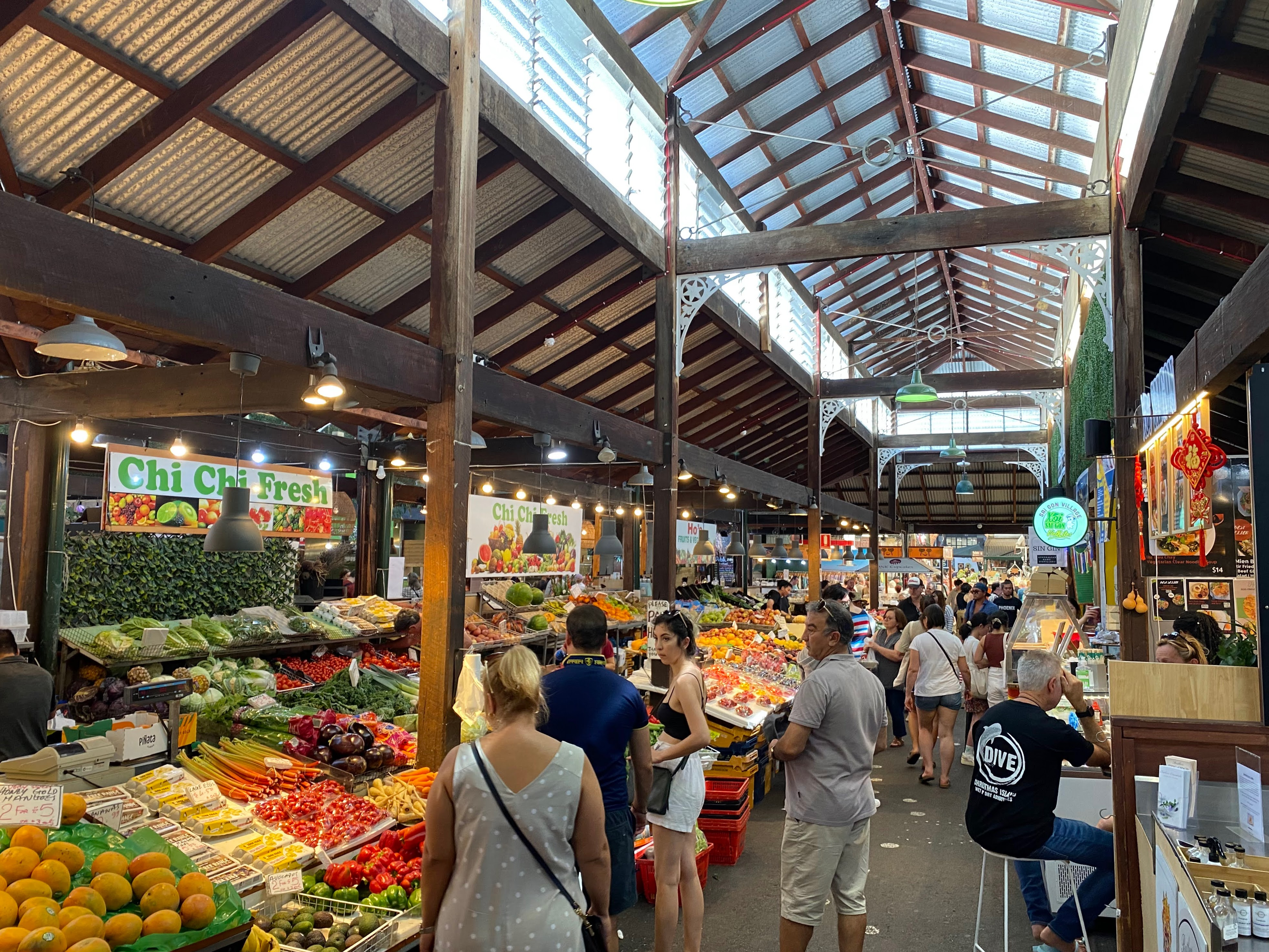
Fruit and vegetable hall, in 2023

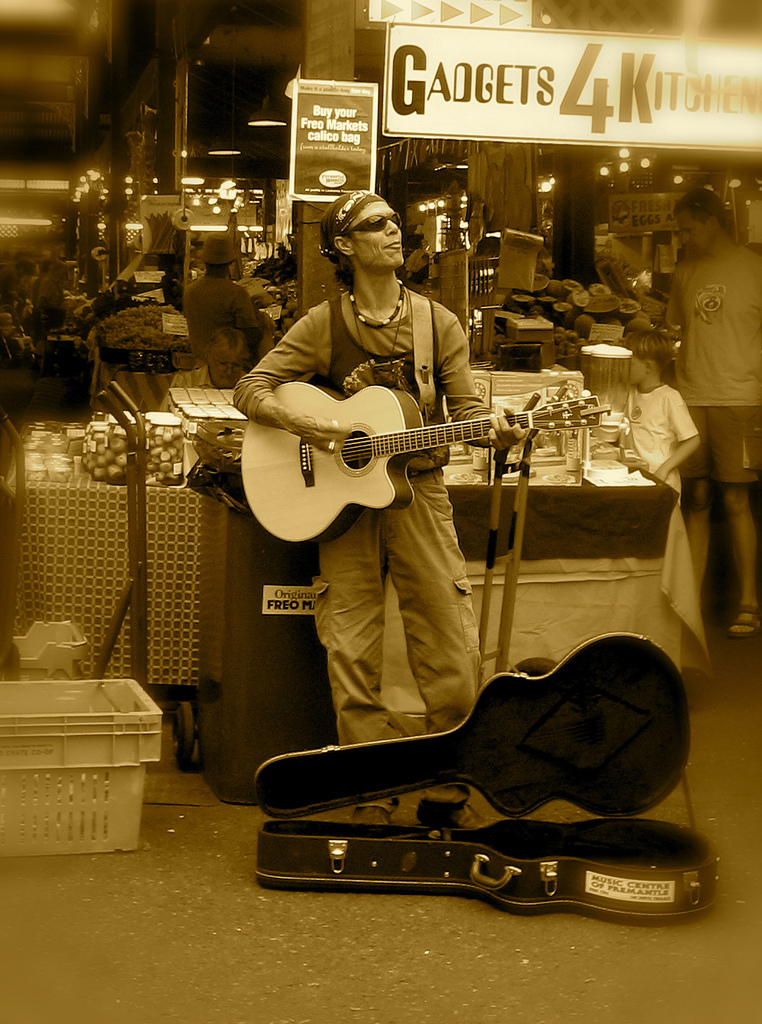
Fremantle Markets are a popular site for buskers

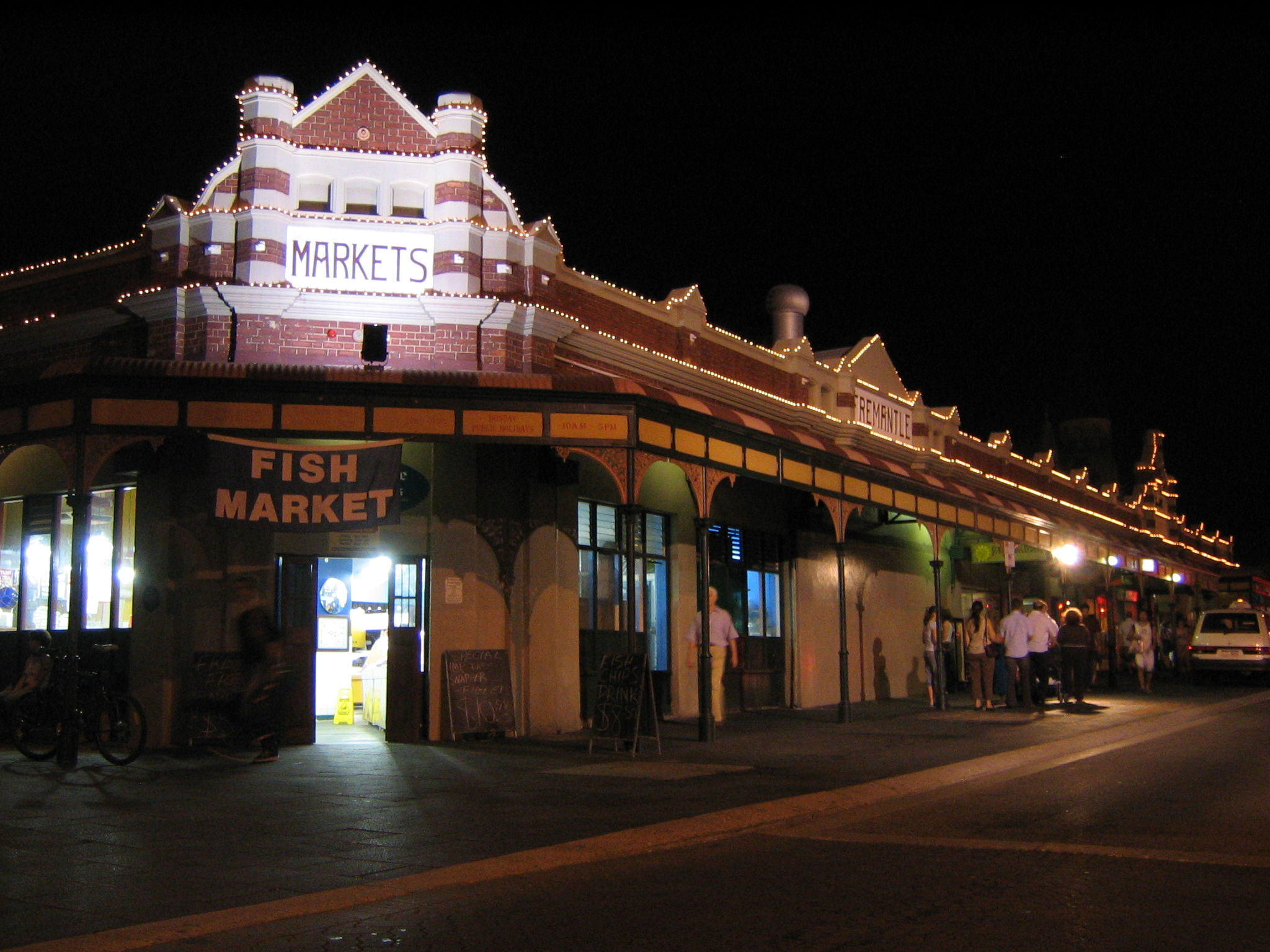
Market Street frontage on a Friday night

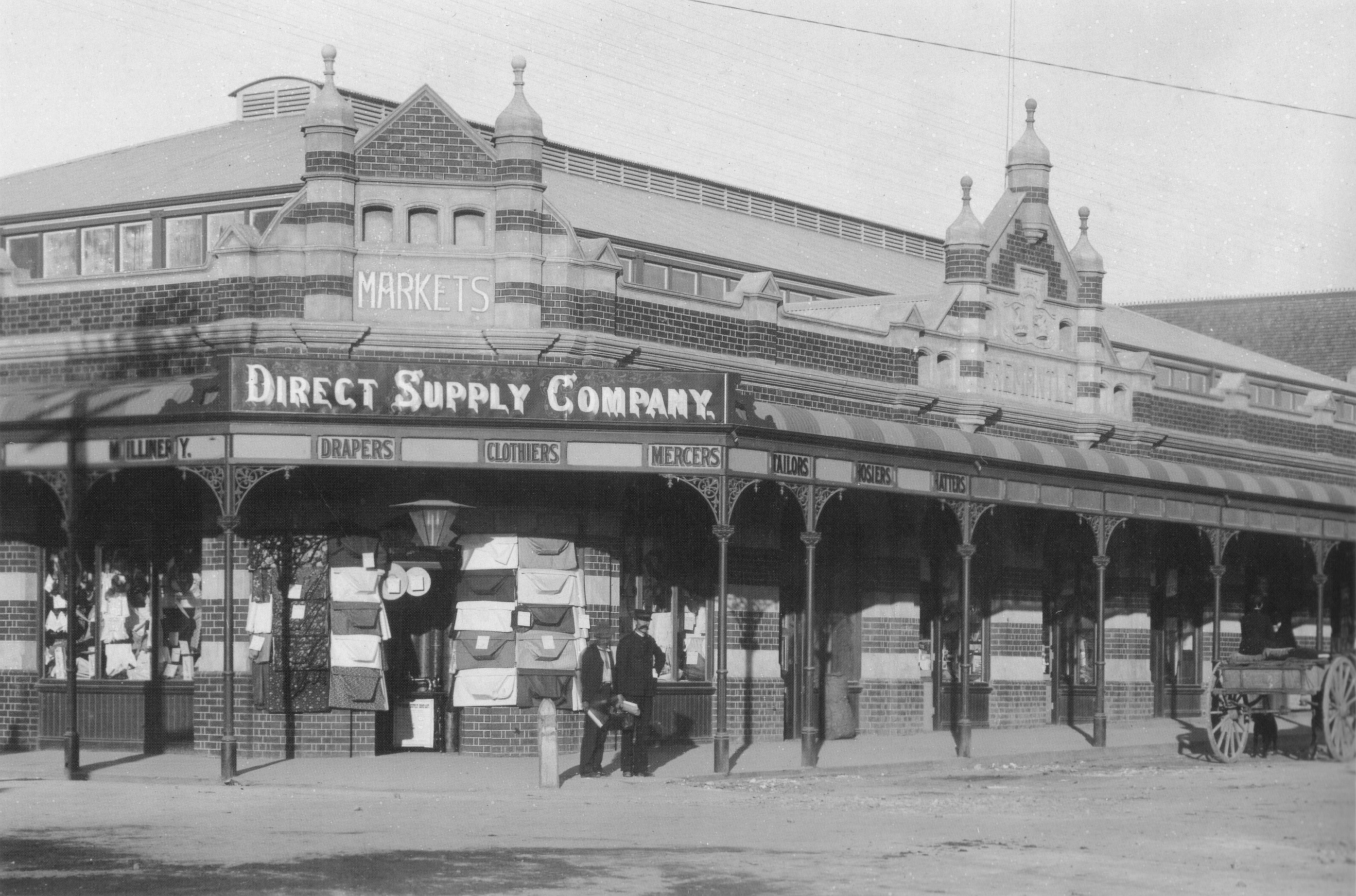
Market Street frontage, c. 1904
