= Jewish Communal Appeal =

Jewish Communal Appeal (JCA) is a prominent Jewish charitable organisation based in New South Wales. Founded in 1967, the organisation raises communal funds for distribution among Jewish Day Schools, social service organisations, the NSW Community Security Group, and other Jewish community bodies. In some cases, local Jewish organisations, such as the Sydney Jewish Museum, did not immediately join the JCA funding network, and instead waited years before joining and receiving funding.

In addition to supporting NSW organisations, the JCA also supports Jewish community institutions in the Australian Capital Territory. In total, the JCA provides funding for 24 local organisations. The JCA has sponsored community studies of Jews in New South Wales and Australia-wide. The JCA model of charitable distribution is credited as improving outcomes during the COVID-19 pandemic.
