= Perth Hebrew Congregation =

Synagogue in Perth, Western Australia

- Location in Perth, Western Australia

Religion
- Affiliation: Modern Orthodox Judaism
- Ecclesiastical or organisational status: Synagogue
- Status: Active

Location
- Location: Menora, Perth, Western Australia
- Country: Australia
- Coordinates: 31°54′50″S 115°51′54″E

Architecture
- Architect: William Wolf (Brisbane Street synagogue)
- Established: 1892; 134 years ago
- Completed: 1892 (Brisbane Street); 1975 (current)

Website
- www.thephc.com.au

The Perth Hebrew Congregation (often shortened as PHC) is a Modern Orthodox synagogue located in the Perth suburb of Menora in Western Australia. Established as an organization in 1892, it is the oldest of three shuls and one temple serving the Jewish community in Perth. The synagogue offers facilities for daily services and educational programmes, and PHC also houses a library, a mikveh and a bookshop. It is situated within a Jewish precinct that also includes JHub Maccabi Community Centre and Carmel School, a Jewish Day School.

== Overview ==
The first two scrolls in the possession of the Perth Hebrew Congregation were gifts from members of the Montefiore clan.

The synagogue received a grant of A$100,000 as part of the National Community Crime Prevention Programme (NCCPP). The project was to "design and erect a perimeter security fence complete with access controls around the premises of the Perth Synagogue". The rationale was for protection of the premises and population in the event of a potential attack on PHC.

The synagogue includes a child care – namely Ruth Landau Harp Early Learning offering education to children aged from 6 weeks to 5 years, educating children on the Jewish calendar of events and Jewish values, with all meals being kosher.

== History ==
The long-time home of the congregation was established at 117 Brisbane Street in 1897. The synagogue's New York architect, William Wolf, later designed His Majesty's Theatre in Perth. Wolf designed the synagogue to specifications that would accommodate for 300 men and 50 women. Architecturally, it was built in a Moorish style, using both brick and stone. Prince's Hall, a function room, was also situated to the rear. The hall was used for the congregation's Hebrew school as well as Yiddish theatre productions and other social gatherings.

Western Australia's first Jewish congregation, Fremantle Synagogue on the corner of South Terrace and Parry Street, was absorbed into the Perth Hebrew Congregation in 1907. For the more orthodox Jewish settlers, the more Anglicized services of the Perth Hebrew Congregation had no appeal. They formed the Perth Jewry Association and built a synagogue known as the Palmerston Shule. Possible conflict between the two congregations was avoided through the leadership of Perth Jewry's first minister, Rabbi D. I. Freedman who served in the Perth Hebrew Congregation for 42 years from 1897 up until his death in 1939.

In 1967, the congregation was granted a parcel of land by David Brand's government. The land in Scadden Pine Plantation on the corner of Plantation Street and Freedman Street (named after PHC rabbi, Rabbi D. I. Freedman) in Menora was intended as the site of the congregation's new synagogue. In 1972, the congregation voted in favour to construct a new synagogue on the land, as well as a smaller sanctuary for youth services, by 176 votes to 112. The ground of the site was consecrated by Rabbi Coleman on the first night of Hanukkah in 1972. The new synagogue was completed in 1974 and officially opened in August of that year, in the presence of air commodore Hughie Edwards and premier, Charles Court. 1000 people attended the opening.

The Brisbane Street synagogue was sold for $175,000. It was on the National Trust of Western Australia recorded list, with its preservation encouraged, but the trust did not pursue measures to ensure this. It was subsequently demolished in 1975. The modern synagogue constructed in Menora, incorporated a wall of stained glass memorial windows taken from the congregation's former synagogue on Brisbane Street. The decision to move the synagogue was due to factors such as the previous building being in a poor state of repair and requiring significant investment. In addition, Menora was regarded as a more desirable area and one where 75% of the membership lived within 1.6 kilometres (1 mi).

Amid the relocation, in August 1974, the congregation also held a special ceremony for the burial of outworn holy books and rituals from the synagogue and homes of congregants.

In 1974, a row unfolded between rabbi Coleman of PHC and rabbi Uri Themal of Temple David, Perth's Reform congregation. The two previously ran end-of-term seminars together at Mount Lawley Senior High School. During rabbi Themal's absence, rabbi Coleman made the decision to split the children into two separate groups, Orthodox and Reform for religious instruction. Rabbi Themal attended the Royal Commission on Human Relationships where he supported the end of the criminalisation of homosexuality. He accused rabbi Coleman as using this as justification to split the religious education of the children into two groups.

However, in 1979, the PHC rabbi emeritus, Louis Rubin-Zachs made history when he addressed congregants at Temple David. In a Thanksgiving service for the Egypt–Israel peace treaty. He told the congregation that in addressing them he was honouring the late Brigadier Philip Masel, a member of both PHC and Temple David. In 1980, both PHC and Temple David coordinated Jewish courses at Mount Lawley College of Advanced Education as part of its community programs. The program covered eight areas of Jewish study, including Bible study, Hebrew classes, Jewish representation in dramatic literature as well as classes pertaining to politics, economics and archaeology of Israel and the Middle East.

In 1989, Rabbi Dovid Freilich, distanced the congregation from reports of a rift between established members and recent immigrants from South Africa. Freilich understood disagreements as a "misunderstanding". He welcomed the involvement of South African Jewry, defining them as a community "who have a wealth of communal experience and are keen to give of themselves to the community." Freilich also reported to have "excellent relations" with Temple David. He expanded: "There seems no positive purpose in Orthodox Jews shunning the Temple."

In January 1990, the Kosher Food Store, located in the synagogue's grounds, was daubed with antisemitic graffiti.

In March 1992, Jonathan Sacks, on his first Australian tour as Chief Rabbi of the United Hebrew Congregations of the Commonwealth arrived in Perth to mark the centenary of the PHC. Sacks was the keynote speaker at the centennial dinner, where he praised the increasing Jewish population in Perth: "I wonder if there's another community golah (diaspora) which could say as Perth has said that in the last 15 years its population has increased by 100 percent." Sacks also praised Rabbi Coleman, quoting a radio interviewer that he was the "Jewish community's greatest contribution to the life of Western Australia."

In 1993, Rabbi Freilich started a yeshiva, the Yeshivat Rodef Shalom (Pursuer of Peace). Students also received classes from Carmel School Jewish Studies head, Yaakov Levi.

In July 2004, the synagogue was heavily defaced with antisemitic vandalism.

In 2022, it was proposed by City of Vincent to name a lane way on Brisbane Street honouring both the Brisbane Street and Palmerston synagogues. Shule Lane, which lies between both of the original synagogues, has since been incorporated by the municipality.

== List of rabbis ==
- 1897–1939: Rabbi David Isaac Freedman
- 1939–1964: Rabbi Louis Rubin-Zacks
- 1964–1967: Rev Emanuel Fischer
- 1965–1985: Rabbi Dr Shalom Coleman
- 1985–1986: Rabbi Michael Orelowitz
- 1988–2018: Rabbi David Freilich
- 2018–present: Rabbi Daniel Lieberman

== See also ==
- Temple David
- Carmel School
- List of synagogues in Australia
- History of the Jews in Australia
