= JHub Maccabi Community Centre =

Jewish community centre in Yokine, Western Australia

- Founded: 1974; 52 years ago
- Location: 61 Woodrow Ave, Yokine WA 6050
- Coordinates: 31°54′04″S 115°51′45″E
- Website: https://www.jhubperth.com/

JHub Maccabi Community Centre (previously Perth Jewish Centre) is a Jewish Community Centre in Yokine that serves the Jewish communities of Perth and Western Australia.

The centre is home to a number of organisations such as the Western Australia chapters of the Jewish National Fund, United Israel Appeal, National Council of Jewish Women and the Women's International Zionist Organization. It also houses the Holocaust Institute of WA and Menora Charity Fund (incorporating Jewish Care).

It is situated within a Jewish precinct that also includes Perth Hebrew Congregation and Carmel School, a Jewish Day School.

The centre was redeveloped in recent years, with the main construction completed in 2024. A forthcoming Holocaust education centre will open, alongside a cafe, offices, a day-care centre, lecture theatre, function spaces and landscaped gardens.

== History ==
Maccabi WA has been based at the site since 1952. In 1974, a Jewish community centre was established on the grounds of Maccabi, and became known as the Perth Jewish Centre.

In 1977, the Israel Information Centre opened at the Perth Jewish Centre. An initiative of the State Zionist Council of Western Australia, it provided specialist tourist information about Israel. It also included a library of books related to Israel.

In 1982, the centre hosted a concert of "Jewish culture", which included content in Yiddish, Hebrew Ladino and English. There were Yiddish stories, humorous sketches and modern Israeli music as well as Ernest Bloch's Nigun from the Baal Shem.

In 2001, the Perth Jewish Centre was targeted by gunmen, firing two shots into the building the Saturday after Rosh Hashanah and breaking two panes of glass.

=== Redevelopment ===
In 2016, the centre staff began working on plans to secure the future site, envisaging a redevelopment of the site. In 2019, the Australian Government committed $6 million to the redevelopment, providing more modern facilities, as well as the establishment of a Holocaust museum.

In 2020, the Government of Western Australia pledged $6 million to the redevelopment of the site for a new Jewish community centre. The project also received a $6 million commitment from the Commonwealth fund. In September 2023, Mark Dreyfus, Attorney-General of Australia visited the site amid its construction. The main construction was completed in 2024. The new building was designed by architect, David Karotkin, who has previously worked as an architect in Tel Aviv in Israel.

The Holocaust education centre will also cater to the wider multifaith Western Australia population as it aims to provide on-site programs to visiting high school groups.

The centre will also commemorate Aboriginal social justice activist William Cooper with a memorial. In the wake of Kristallnacht, Cooper led a December 1938 protest march in Melbourne to the German consulate, condemning the persecution of Jews by Nazi Germany.

In September 2024, the Jewish National Fund arranged for Eylon Levy to address 400 attendees at its Annual Event held at the centre. In November, the centre is hosting the Israeli Film Festival, showcasing Israeli cinema.

== See also ==
- Perth Hebrew Congregation
- Carmel School
- Temple David
