= Temple David (Perth) =

Synagogue in Perth, Western Australia

- Location within Perth

Religion
- Affiliation: Progressive Judaism
- Ecclesiastical or organizational status: Synagogue
- Leadership: Rabbi Kim Ettlinger
- Status: Active

Location
- Location: Mount Lawley, Perth, Western Australia
- Country: Australia
- Interactive map of Temple David
- Coordinates: 31.9293°S 115.8723°E

Architecture
- Architect: Harold Boas
- Established: 1952; 74 years ago

Website
- templedavid.org.au

Temple David is a Progressive Jewish congregation and synagogue located in Mount Lawley, an inner northern suburb of Perth. It is the sole progressive congregation in the state of Western Australia. The congregation was established in 1952.

== History ==
A key proponent for a Jewish congregation under the auspices of Reform Judaism, was Dr Ronald Taft, from the Psychology faculty at the University of Western Australia. Taft had been a member of Temple Beth Israel in Melbourne and took up his faculty position in 1951. In May 1952, a formation known as the "Liberal Jewish Group" was established and began conducting Reform services. Rabbi Herman Sanger, a key figure in the history of Temple Beth Israel, led a service in the same year, addressing 300 in attendance. Taft also became foundation president of the congregation. Jewish refugees and Holocaust survivors from Europe were among the founding members of the congregation.

In 1959, Rabbi George W. Rubens became the congregation's first permanent rabbi and the congregation was renamed Temple David. Rubens, born in the Free City of Danzig had previously served congregations in Melbourne and Hobart. His great-grandfather had been a founder of the Great Synagogue, Danzig's fist Reform synagogue.

In 1966, the congregation extended its service offering, with Saturday Shabbat services offered each week rather than fortnightly.

In 1974, a row unfolded between Temple David rabbi Uri Themal and his Orthodox counterpart, rabbi Coleman of Perth Hebrew Congregation (PHC). The two previously ran end-of-term seminars together at Mount Lawley Senior High School. During rabbi Themal's absence, rabbi Coleman made the decision to split the children into two separate groups, Orthodox and Reform for religious instruction. Rabbi Themal attended the Royal Commission on Human Relationships where he supported the end of the criminalisation of homosexuality. He accused rabbi Coleman as using this as justification to split the religious education of the children into two groups.

In 1976, it was reported that Cantor Marshall Stone had introduced several changes to the service music with more "prayer settings specifically composed by Jewish composers for the Cantor-Choir-Organ ensemble". This was a move away from the "arrangements" for the "Reform temple of music originally written for Orthodox and/or Conservative synagogues in the Eighteenth and Nineteenth Centuries."

In 1979, the Perth Hebrew Congregation rabbi emeritus, Louis Rubin-Zachs made history when he addressed Temple David in a Thanksgiving service for the Egypt–Israel peace treaty. He told the congregation that in addressing them he was honouring the late Brigadier Philip Masel, a member of both PHC and Temple David. In 1980, both PHC and Temple David coordinated Jewish courses at Mt Lawley College of Advanced education as part of its community programs. The program covered eight areas of Jewish study, including Bible study, Hebrew classes, Jewish representation in dramatic literature as well as classes pertaining to politics, economics and archaeology of Israel and the Middle East.

In 1980, the synagogue introduced a new teaching method to learn Hebrew, using the ulpan approach from Israel.

A specially recorded service at the synagogue in November 1987, was broadcast in early 1988 for the ABC TV Sunday Worship slot.

In 1989, Rabbi Dovid Freilich, long-time leader of Perth Hebrew Congregation reported to have "excellent relations" with Temple David, expanding: "There seems no positive purpose in Orthodox Jews shunning the Temple."

In 1992, Carmel School, Perth's only Jewish day school made changes to its enrollment policies, enabling more children affiliated with Reform Judaism and Temple David to attend. It would, for the first time, begin to accept children that are not Jewish according to Orthodox Jewish halacha definitions. The school's prior admissions policy had been criticised by Temple David rabbi, John Spiro in 1979.

=== Buildings ===
The congregation established a permanent home in 1954, by purchasing a family home on Clifton Crescent in Mount Lawley, that was converted to use as a synagogue. The synagogue was officially opened on 27 October 1954. The synagogue was dedicated in 1963, following an 18-month building and renovation process, with the construction of separate building housing a sanctuary and religion school. As part of the ceremony, a plaque was unveiled in commemoration of the Jewish dead from both World Wars. The new Ark acted as a focal point, surrounded by stained glass windows with menorah designs. Three classrooms and a function hall were also constructed. The works were completed at a cost of £A 28,000, equivalent to A$908,000 in 2022. A caretaker's residence was constructed in 1973. The architect responsible for the designs was Harold Boas, a founding member of the congregation. Boas's nephew Harold Krantz' firm Krantz and Sheldon, established by Krantz and Robert Sheldon, a Jewish immigrant from Vienna, designed the temple's kindergarten.

== Leadership ==
In 1973, rabbi Uri Themal (1940-), a Berlin-born Holocaust survivor was appointed to lead the congregation. He stayed in the role for nearly four years before taking on a new role in the Federal Government, involving the development of Australia's multiculturalism policy.

In 1979, a German-born, Israeli-raised rabbi, John Gabriel Spiro (1937–1997), was appointed rabbi of congregation, succeeding Cantor Abraham Jacobi. Spiro was a former professional opera singer, had performed at Carnegie Hall and studied at the Hebrew University of Jerusalem. He had also fought in both the Six-Day War and the Yom Kippur War.

In 1984, Rabbi Ian Morris (1956-), an Australian Hebrew Union College graduate, was appointed to lead the congregation. Morris was succeeded by Rabbi Charles David Wallach, from Johannesburg, serving from 1988 to 1995. American rabbi Joshua M. Aaronson served the congregation between 1998 and 2002.

The congregation was served by Israeli-born rabbi Adi Cohen from 2014 to 2021. In 2022, Cohen was succeeded by the congregation's current rabbi, the South African-born Kim Ettlinger. Rabbi Ettlinger studied at rabbinical school in the United States and served Temple Beth Israel in Melbourne from 2010 to 2021.

== See also ==
- Perth Hebrew Congregation
- Carmel School
- JHub Maccabi Community Centre
- List of synagogues in Australia
- History of the Jews in Australia
