= South Terrace, Fremantle =

Road in Fremantle, Western Australia

South Terrace Western Australia

General information
- Type: Road
- Length: 2.6 km (1.6 mi)

Major junctions
- North end: Market Street, Fremantle
- Parry Street; South Street; Marine Terrace
- South end: Ocean Road, South Fremantle

South Terrace, Fremantle is a road in Fremantle, Western Australia that is renowned as the "Cappucino Strip" of Fremantle, due to the high number of coffee shops and restaurants.

South Terrace extends from Market Street southwards, parallel to the coast, for 2.6 kilometres (1.6 mi) to Ocean Road.

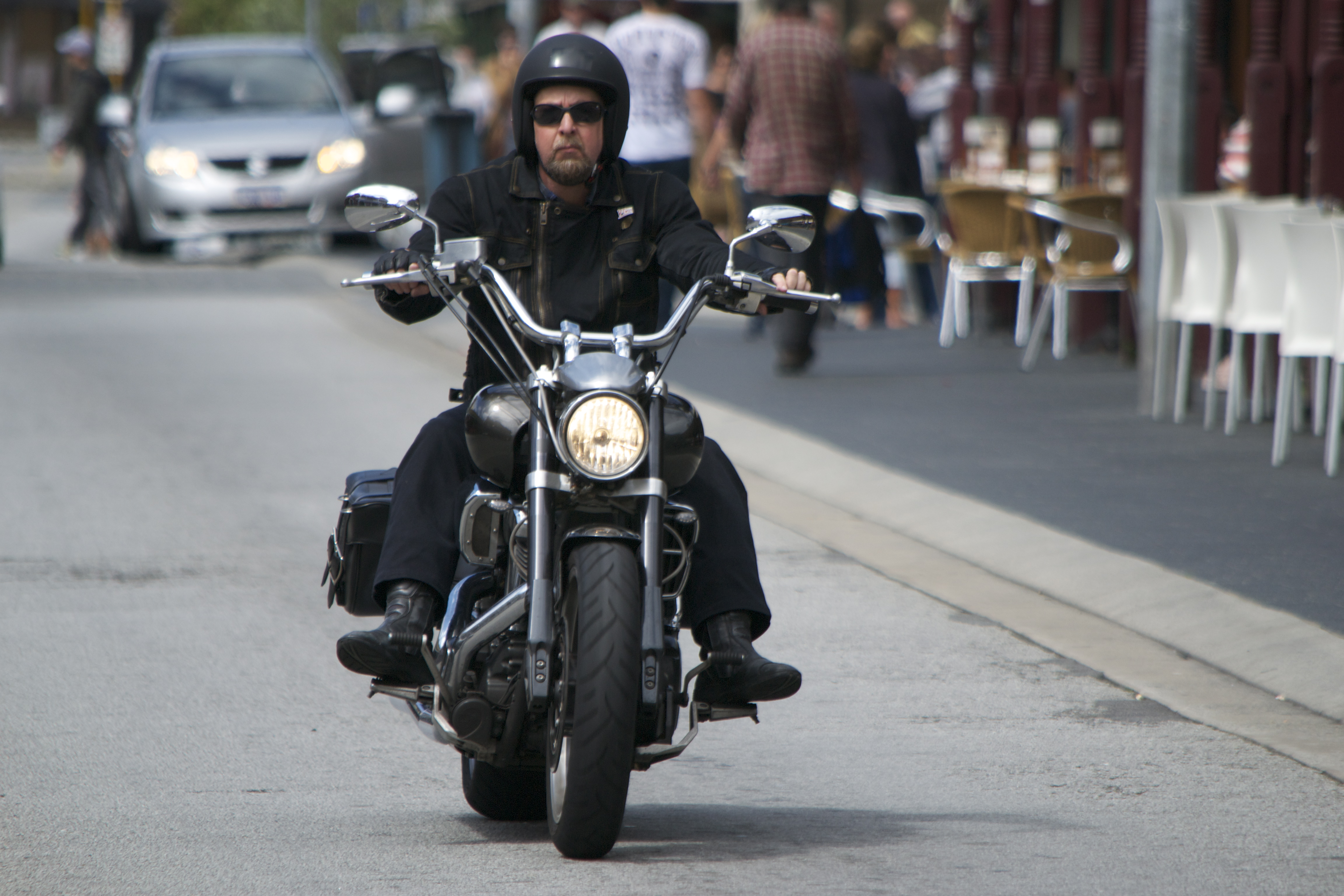
A motorcyclist on South Terrace

It is also the location of the Fremantle Technical College, Fremantle Markets, and Fremantle Hospital, along with a significant number of heritage buildings.

View along South Terrace, from Market Street to Essex Street

A number of historic hotels are on South Terrace, including the Sail and Anchor (formerly the Freemasons Hotel), the Newport, Norfolk, Davilak and South Beach hotels.

== Intersections ==
Location	km	mi	Destinations	Notes
Fremantle	0.0	0.0	Bannister Street.	Northern terminus. Continues as Market Street northbound
Fremantle	0.1	0.062	Collie Street	
Fremantle	0.3	0.19	Parry Street northbound / Norfolk Street southbound	Traffic light controlled intersection. No right turn permitted from Parry Street to South Terrace or from South Terrace to Norfolk Street
Fremantle	0.7	0.43	Little Howard Street northeastbound Wray Avenue southeastbound Howard Street westbound	Roundabout. No access to roundabout from Howard or Little Howard Streets
Fremantle–South Fremantle boundary	1.1	0.68	South Street – Kardinya, Murdoch, Canning Vale	
South Fremantle	2.3	1.4	Douro Road – Hamilton Hill, Henderson, Rockingham	Roundabout
South Fremantle	2.6	1.6	South Beach Promenade	Southern terminus. Road curves westbound to become Ocean Road where it ends at a T-intersection with Ocean Drive
1.000 mi = 1.609 km; 1.000 km = 0.621 mi: Incomplete access; Note: Intersections with minor local roads are not shown

== Notes ==
- "South Terrace, Fremantle" (Map). Google Maps.
