= Carmel School, Perth =

School in Perth, Western Australia,

Carmel School

Location
- 123 Cresswell Road; Dianella, Western Australia, 6059; Australia; 31°53′59″S 115°51′47″E

Information
- Type: Private
- Motto: Faith and Knowledge
- Denomination: Jewish Modern Orthodox
- Established: 1959
- Principal: Chris Hall
- Staff: 100
- Enrolment: 500
- Colours: Blue and white
- Website: www.carmel.wa.edu.au

Carmel School is an Modern Orthodox Jewish school founded in 1959 in Perth, Western Australia. It offers Jewish religious and cultural education as well as conventional secular education for students from Kindergarten to Year 12 through a full-time primary school and a high school. It is the only Jewish day school in Western Australia.

Notable students include singer Troye Sivan and his brother and musician Tyde Levi.

== History ==
The Perth Hebrew School, housed by the Perth Hebrew Congregation was the forerunner to Carmel School.

In 1957 a Jewish kindergarten was opened with 17 pupils, which led to the creation of Carmel School in 1959. Its first location was adjacent to the Brisbane Street synagogue, before moving to its current location in Yokine in 1962. The junior high school was opened in 1974 and in 1978 the senior high school was completed.

In 1984, the school's synagogue complex was opened in a ceremony led by Joe Berinson, Attorney-General of Western Australia, and consecrated by Rabbi Shalom Coleman. The building was designed by architect, John Silbert.

The student body doubled in size between 1984 and 1988, from 250 to 500 students. The increase was led by new arrivals from South Africa. In 1987, a quarter of students had South African parents, with South African children accounting for 60% of some class years.

In 1992, the school made changes to its enrollment policies, enabling more children affiliated with Reform Judaism and Temple David to attend. It would, for the first time, begin to accept children that are not Jewish according to Orthodox Jewish halacha definitions. It would also become open to non-Jewish students. However, in both instances, prospective students would be screened by Perth Hebrew Congregation rabbi, Dovid Freilich. The change came after three-quarters of surveyed parents supporting a more open enrollment policy.

In November 2006 the school opened an Early Learning Centre which houses students from Kindergarten to Year 1.

Since 2008, the school has hosted annual meetings by The Australian Association for Religious Education entitled "Common History – Shared Future", which are "about Judaism [and] featuring some eminent Jewish educators and speakers from around the world".

In 2009, on the 80th birthday of Carmel School Life Member Harry Hoffman OAM, the school published a book about his life entitled Hate Never Sat at My Table. The author was then-principal Christina Dullard. In honour of Hoffman's (and the Korsunski's) philanthropic contributions to Carmel, in the same year the school was renamed H & S Hoffman and G Korsunski Carmel School.

On 13 September 2009 the Kadima Performing Arts Centre, a state-of-the-art building for drama and arts and media was opened. It also celebrated its 50th anniversary in 2009. In 2012, the drama theatre was named the Nassim Family Theatre, in lovely memory of Gladys Nassim at a cocktail evening. In 2017, the school hosted its first High School musical Little Shop of Horrors, in the Nassim Theatre to sell-out crowds.

The school has officially adopted The Jewish War Memorial (located on Fraser Avenue, Kings Park). It seeks to do research into the military servicemen. The school has also adopted the Memorial to the Victims of the Holocaust.

In 2010, the Ishioka and Lara Hana Brady, the subjects of the book Hana's Suitcase were invited to visit Carmel and speak about the Holocaust.

=== Relationship with community ===
Carmel School is at the heart of the Perth Jewish community and is situated in the same area as the Jewish Centre, Maccabi Grounds, The Maurice Zeffert Home, and other Jewish facilities. It upholds a relationship with all these places, as well as the synagogues located in Perth.

== Religion ==
Hebrew and Jewish Studies are both WACE subjects which are taught to high school students, while various Judaica topics are taught to the younger students. Praying is compulsory every morning before school commences.

Debbie Posner is the Torah enrichment teacher, and Debbi Benn is the Head of Primary School Hebrew and Jewish Studies. Simon Lawrence is the director of Jewish studies for the school.

The entire campus has a No Meat policy and all food on site is encouraged to be in accordance with the kashrut laws.

== Education ==
The school has no enrolment fee and a fee schedule for the school is available on request. The school's goal is for all Jewish children to be able to access a Carmel education and so it offers fee assistance where possible, on application.

In Australian Jewish high schools, Holocaust education is taught as part of the Jewish Studies curriculum under Contemporary Jewish History. A study of Jewish schools in Australia by Sophie E. Gelski entitled The Missing Paradigm, cited Dr Judith Berman's research Berman's 1998 and 2001 research, which focused on "the Jewish day school experience in Melbourne, Perth and Sydney, over a fifty year period". She noted that "although the time devoted to teaching the Holocaust had increased, it did vary between a one semester course at Carmel School".

Jonathan Schneider has been President of the Board since 2023. Prior to that, Mark Majzner and previously Larry Rudman were the Board Presidents.

== Controversies ==
In 1996, a mother (who was a Reform Convert) sought to have the school accept her son for enrollment. A court case ensued in which,

the [family] was handed a letter stating specific religious restrictions which would be placed on their son because he was not Jewish according to Orthodox definitions, and therefore prohibited by halacha from participating in some school programs. The Equal Opportunity Tribunal handed down a 46-page document in which it dismissed the family's complaint.

The result of the Goldberg vs. Korsunski Carmel School case, delivered in 1999, was significant for all religious schools, as it effectively allowed "such school to discriminate in favour of members of that particular religion or creed, as long as the discrimination is in 'good faith'". The Equal Opportunity Tribunal defined 'good faith' as "in accordance with practices or beliefs of that religion or creed", and added that it was not required of the school to have to justify those practises or beliefs to "the outside world".

In 2008, a Carmel School science teacher committed suicide after being "linked to child sex-offense allegations". The 15-year-old was not a Carmel student. Lawyers involved in the case said the teacher had been led to believe the youth was 17, when in reality he was underage. The then Carmel School Board President told newspaper JTA "the school board had [already] decided to suspend him because of the allegations". He was not able to be formally notified as he "died the next day". His funeral was attended by over 500 people, including many Carmel students and teachers.
