= Old Perth Technical School =

Heritage-listed building in Perth, Western Australia

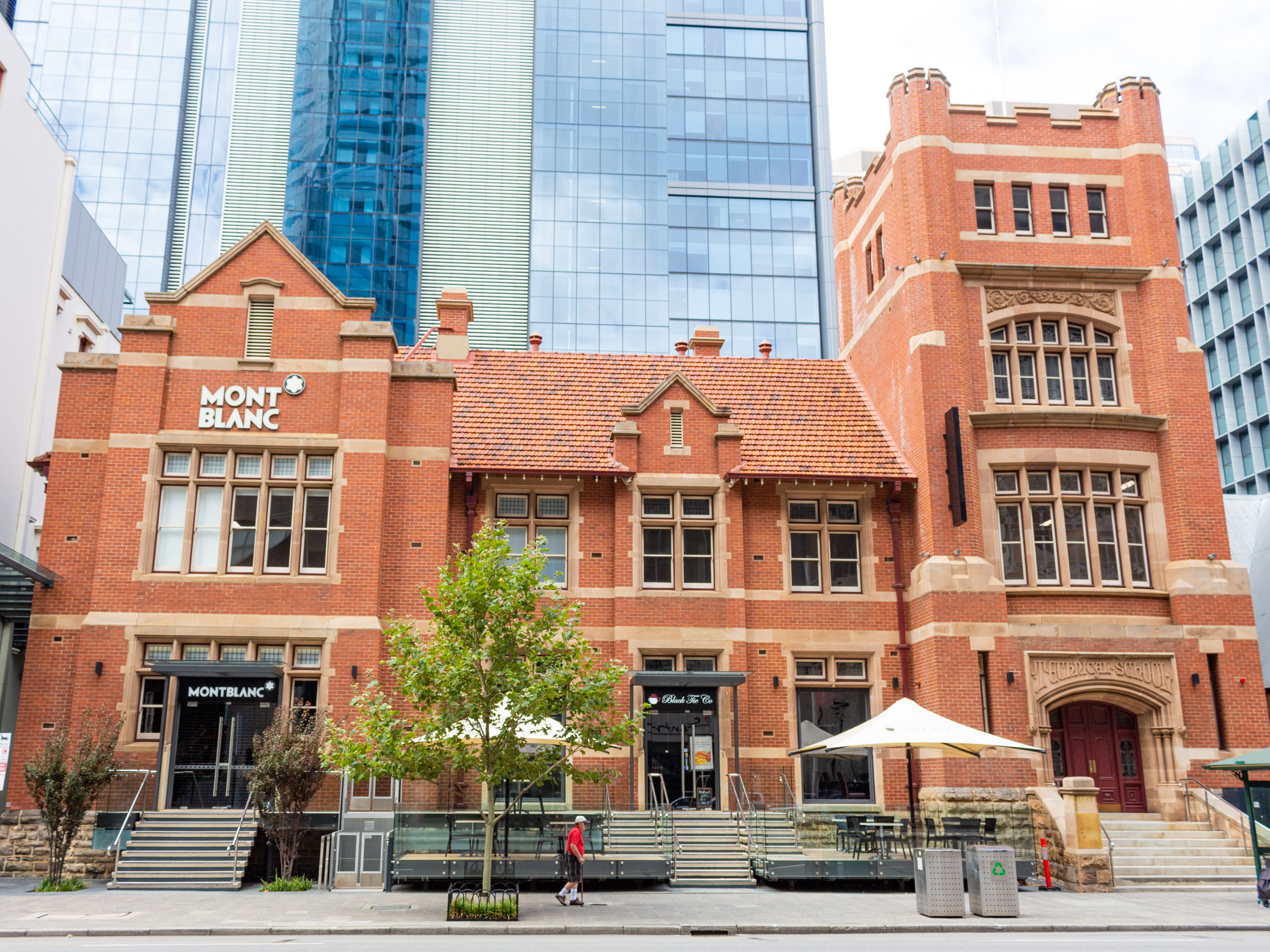
- St Georges Terrace facade in 2018, after commercial refurbishment

General information
- Architectural style: Federation Free/Medieval
- Location: Perth, Western Australia, 137 St Georges Terrace
- Coordinates: 31°57′16″S 115°51′17″E
- Completed: 1900
- Renovated: 2008

Technical details
- Floor count: 4

Design and construction
- Architect: Hillson Beasley

Western Australia Heritage Register
- Type: State Registered Place
- Designated: 25 June 1993
- Part of: Old Perth Boys School and Perth Technical College (2117)
- Reference no.: 2116

The 1910 Perth Technical School building is located at 137 St Georges Terrace, Perth, Western Australia, adjacent to the Old Perth Boys School building, which had served as part of the school's former temporary premises since opening of classes there on 16 May 1900.

A restrained and incomplete example of the Federation Free Medieval architectural style, designed by government architect Hillson Beasley, this is one of the few examples of the style surviving in central Perth.

== Built form ==
The building is a three-level red-brick structure with limestone footings and Donnybrook stone trimmings. There is a square tower, originally intended to be central, with castellated parapets. The interiors exhibit fine craftsmanship in joinery, with jarrah timber panelling and Art Nouveau leadlighting and glass. A grand staircase of jarrah connects the three levels of the building.

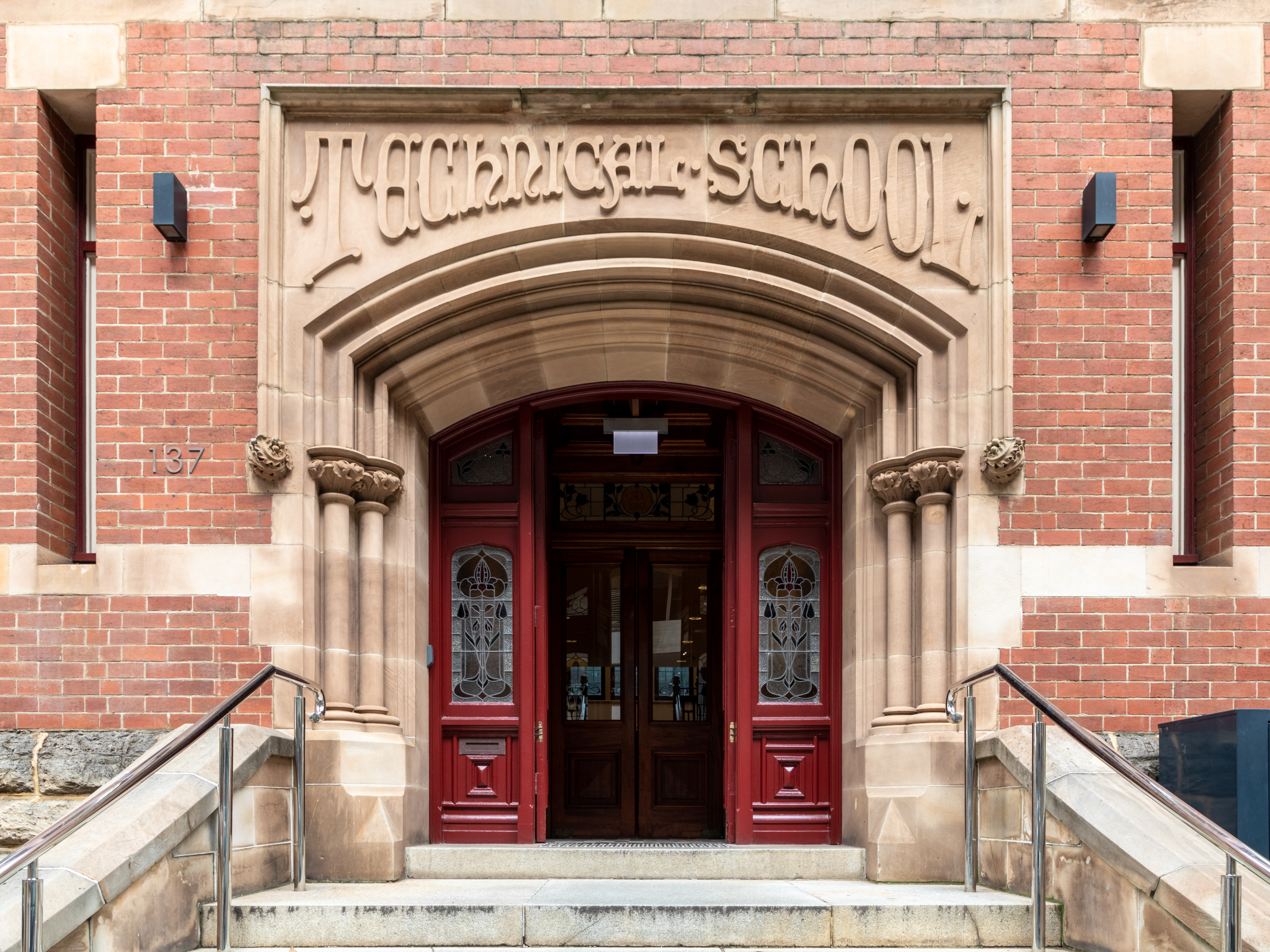
Stone-carved name above main entrance

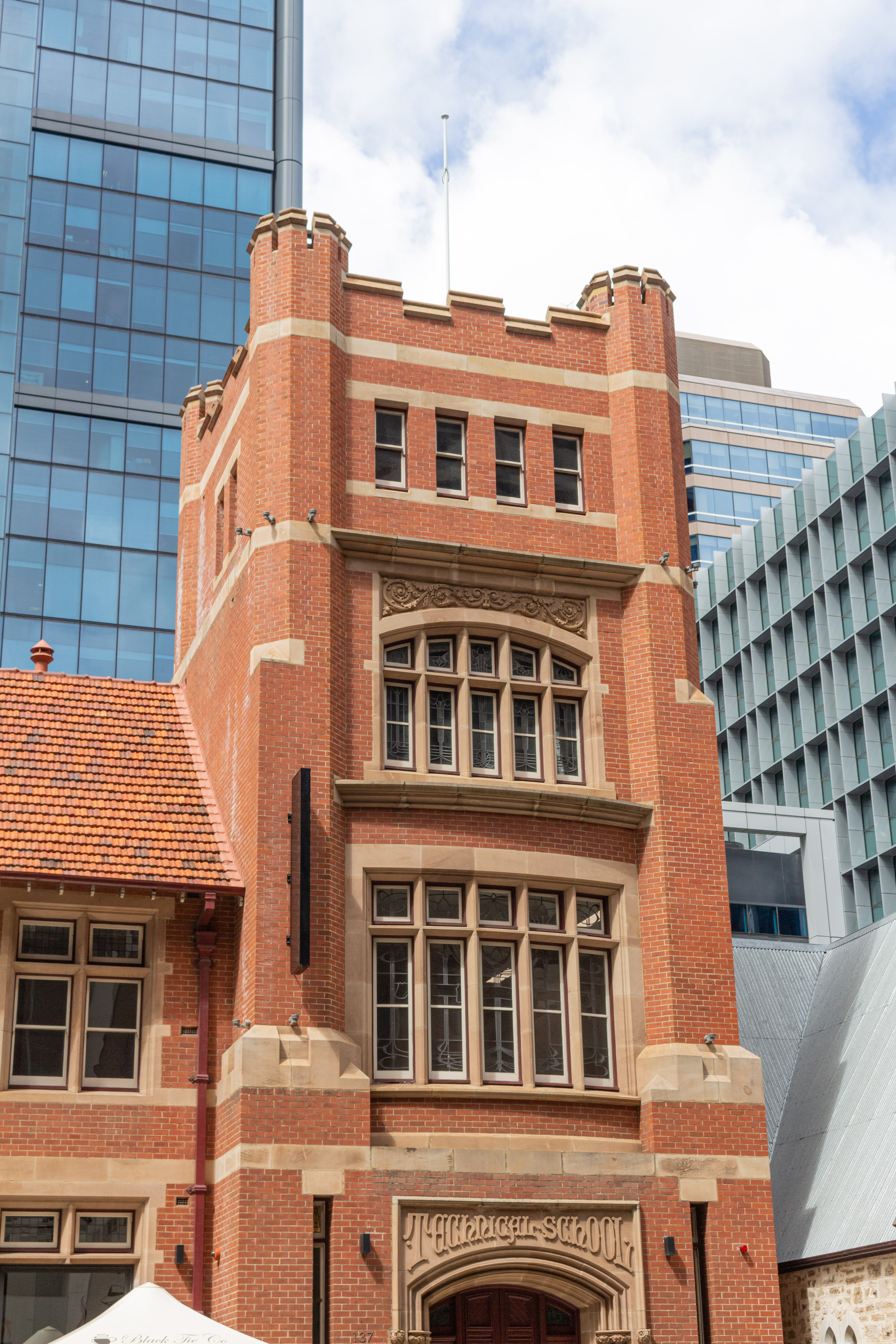
Tower

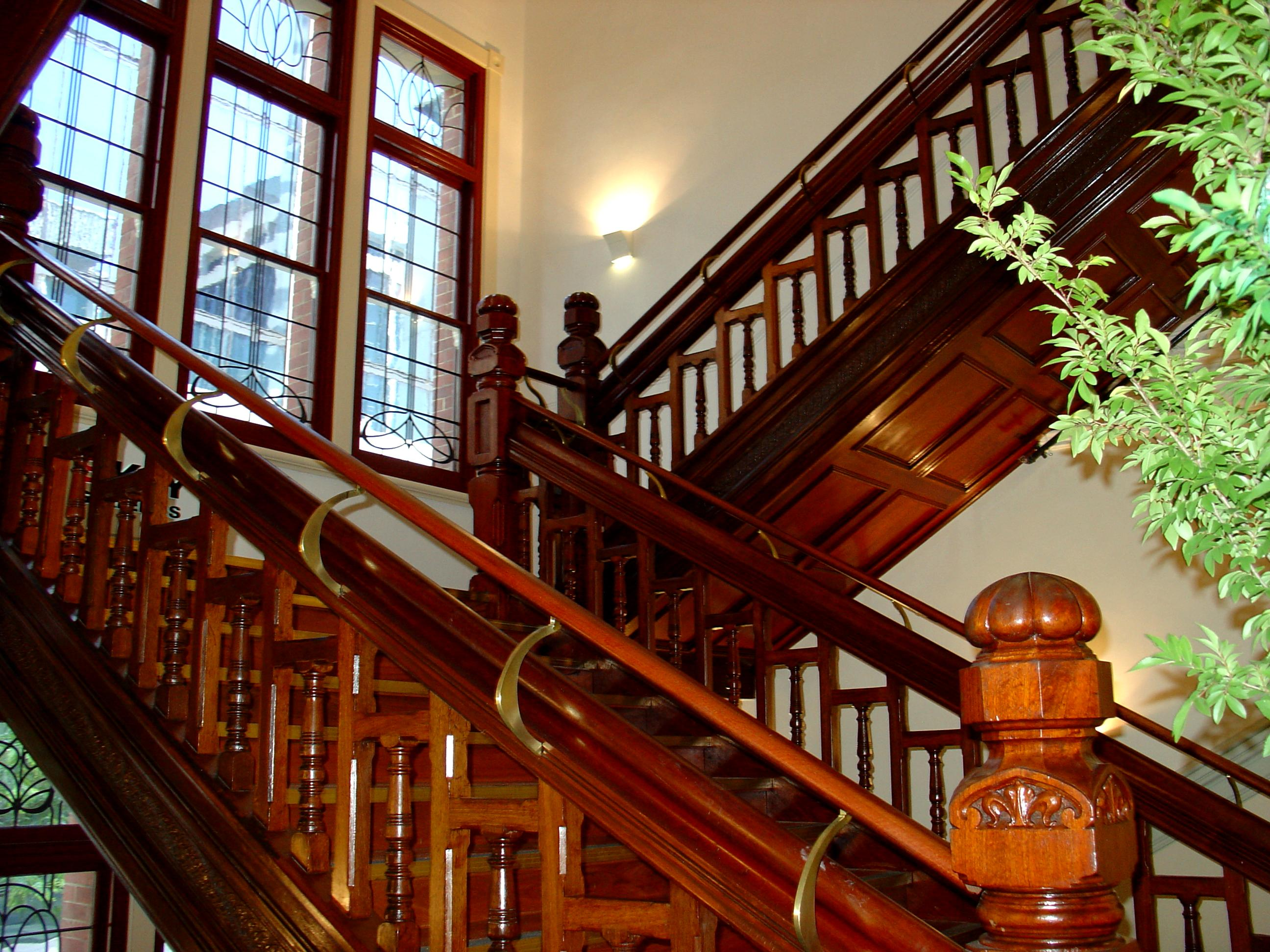
Jarrah staircase

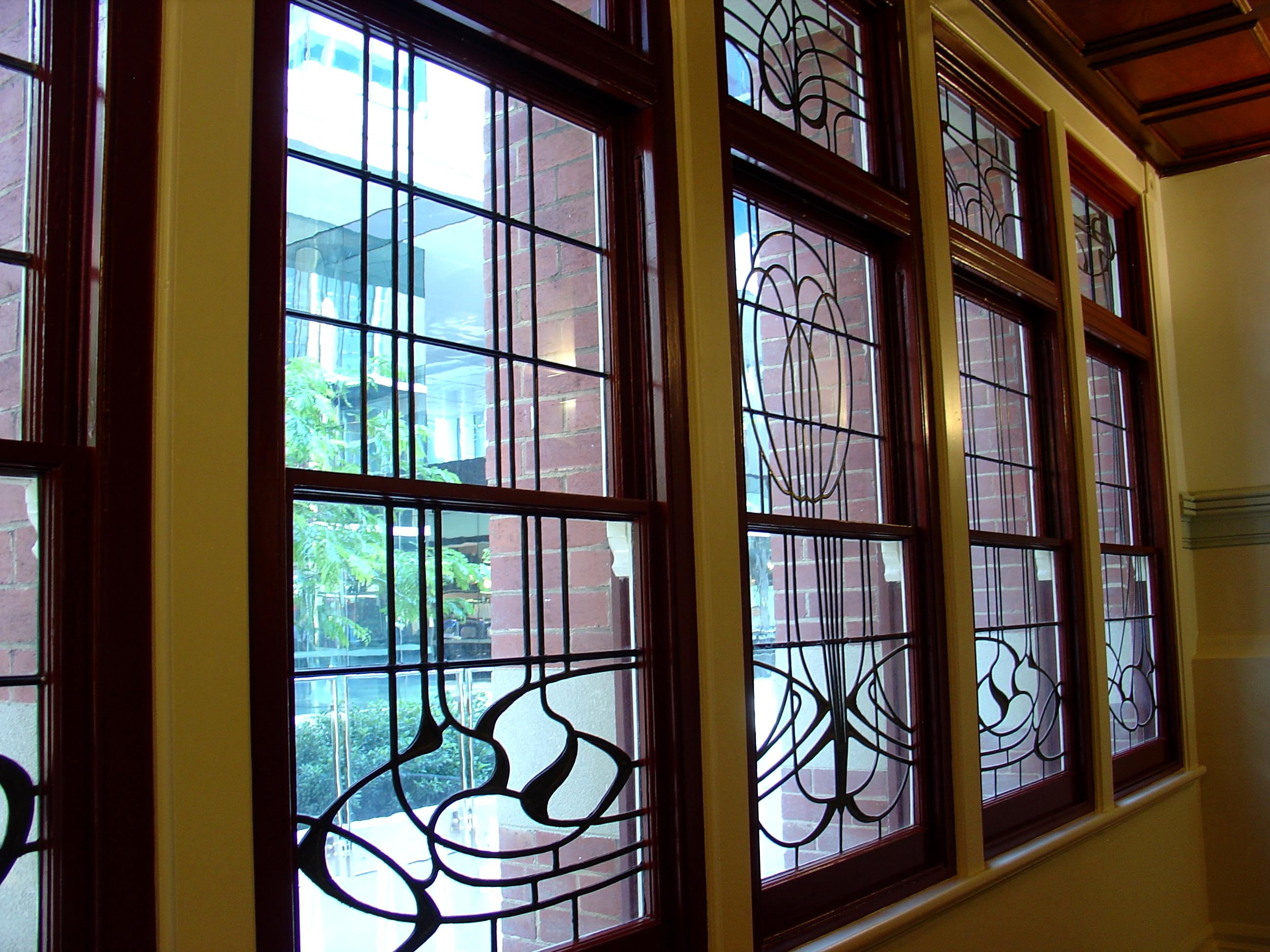
Art Nouveau clear leadlight windows on stairway

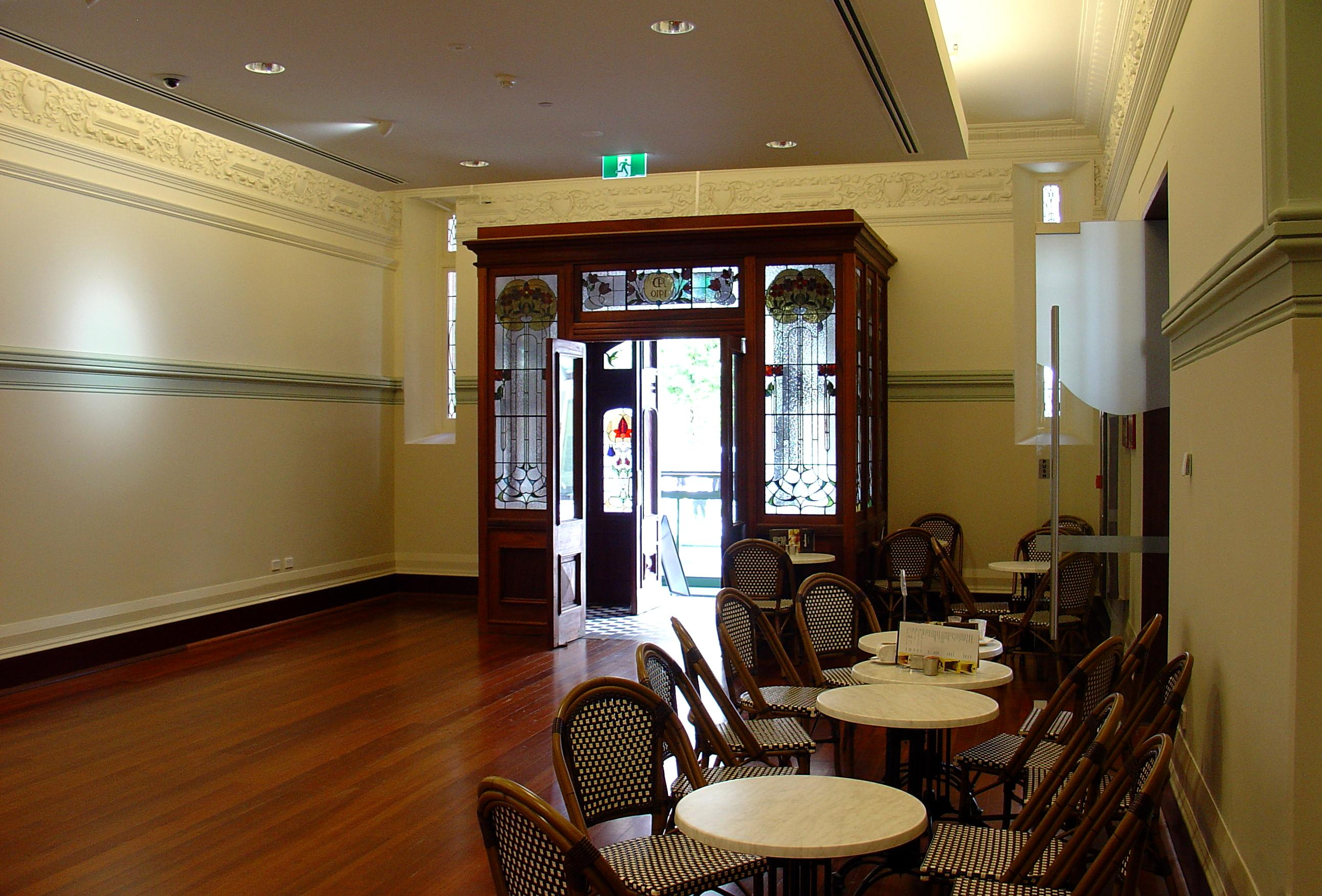
Main entrance and hall

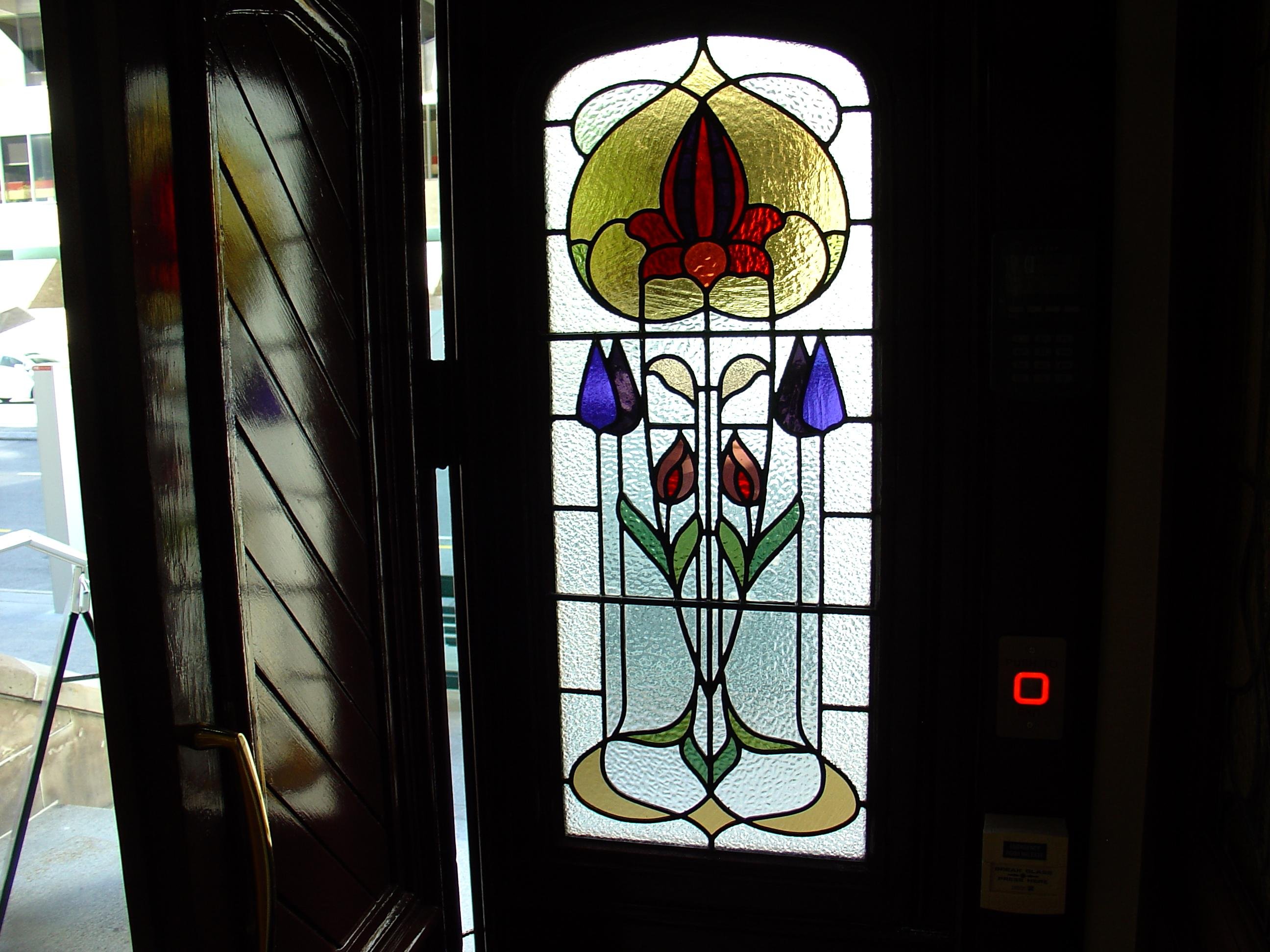
Detail of leadlight window at entry door

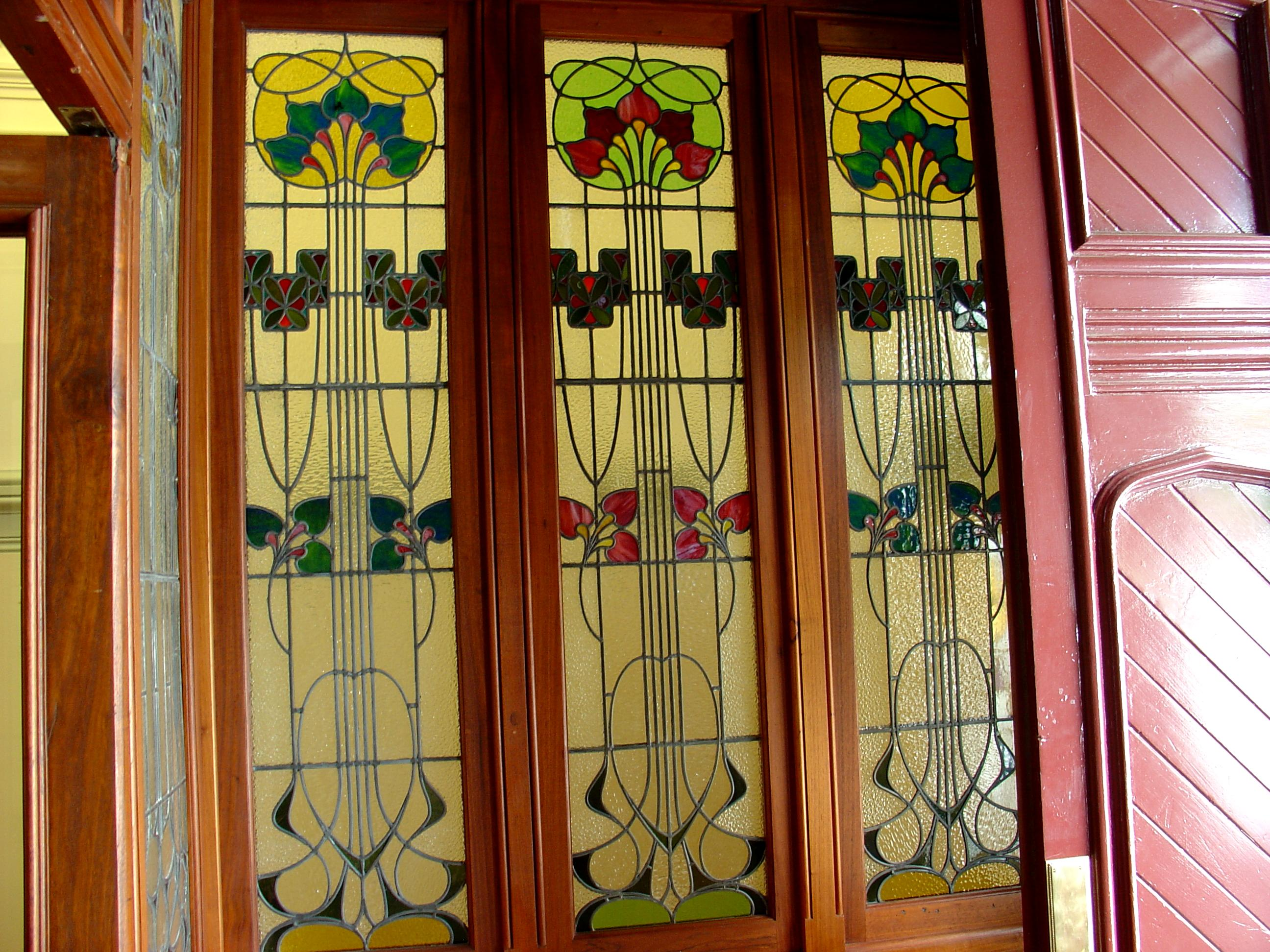
Leadlight windows at sides of entry porch

== History ==
The site of the former Perth Technical School was, in the early years of the Swan River Colony, part of the holding of Henry Willey Reveley. Plans show the manner in which Reveley's mill and spring-fed mill pond were linked by an ingenious mill-race down the steep slope to Bazaar Terrace (now Mounts Bay Road), along the Perth foreshore.

In May 1900, the Perth Technical School opened in the Old Perth Boys School building in St Georges Terrace, with courses available to both boys and girls. The curriculum included chemistry, assaying, engineering, art and design, woodwork and metalwork. With the unexpected death of the superintendent of technical education, Alex Purdie, in 1905, his successor, Frank Allen, who was also director of the Kalgoorlie School of Mines, improved the makeshift facilities in which students had initially been forced to work with an impressive purpose-built technical school, which opened in 1910. Its motto Truth, Beauty and Utility, emblazoned above the front entry, expressed the era's high hopes for technical education. Allen also extended the curriculum to include blacksmithing, carpentry, engine-driving, fitting and turning, plumbing, commercial studies, pharmacy and surveying. The buildings were designed by the chief architect of the Public Works Department (1905–1917), Hillson Beasley – who also designed the Government House ballroom (1899), Western Australian Parliament House (1900), Claremont Teacher Training College (1902), Perth Modern School (1909–11), Midland Courthouse (1907), Fremantle Post Office (1907) and Fremantle Technical College annexe (1910). Beasley is noted for his 'blood and bandages' style of red-brick public architecture.

Perth Technical School was the venue for the first tertiary educational activity in the state. In 1905, The University of Adelaide formally affiliated itself to allow the school's students to sit for undergraduate examinations in mathematics, physics, science, chemistry, geology, mineralogy and botany. In 1908, a biology course was implemented qualifying for the first-year BSc programme. Various degree courses continued to be provided under licence from Adelaide University until the University of Western Australia was established in 1914.

The name Perth Technical College began to be used in 1929. From demand arising in the 1930s depression years, the college wanted to organise courses for the School of Mines Diploma, but lacked the resources and equipment needed for a full first-year course. However, priorities changed in 1939 because of World War II, and the long-sought arrival of federal funding ushered in a new era of building and resources. Mining students ingeniously adapted the building's tower with strategically aligned trapdoors which, when opened, allowed creation of a vertical shaft akin to a mine. The technical college later became part of the Technical and Further Education (TAFE) programme and several other substantial neighbouring buildings were built or adapted to accommodate disciplines such as art and refrigeration. The college site extended southward from St Georges Terrace to Mounts Bay Road. Its facilities were increasingly supplemented by other campuses including the former boys' school in James Street, where the college principal's office was located in the 1980s.

=== Notable alumni ===
Many significant people have studied at Perth Technical College, such as Sir Walter James, 5th Premier of Western Australia (1902 to 1904); Sir Billy Mackie Snedden, 17th Attorney-General of Australia, 23rd Treasurer and Leader of the Opposition; architect William G. Bennett; town planner Margaret Feilman; photographer and furniture carver Amelia Bunbury; pioneer aviator Sir Norman Brearley; and businessmen Sir James Cruthers; and Sir Lance Brisbane. Speech pathologist Lionel Logue taught at the school from 1910 to 1911.

=== Redevelopment ===
Proposed demolition of all buildings on the St Georges Terrace site was announced in 1985 by a state government agency, the WA Development Corporation, with the extraordinary support of the National Trust of Australia (WA), to facilitate major redevelopment tenders. However, premier Brian Burke was persuaded to order preservation of the 1910 building (only), following a public campaign waged by a pressure-group, "the Castle Keepers". In February 1985, the large site (including the various other college buildings) was valued at A$19 million, equivalent to A$61.7 million in 2022.

In 1986 Laurie Connell and Alan Bond, through his Bond Corporation, both bought 25% stakes in a larger amalgamated site which included Newspaper House, the Royal Insurance Building, and the 1890s WA Trustee Co building, in partnership with the State Superannuation Board. The consortium paid $33.5 million for the site. Two years later, the site was sold to Kerry Packer and Warren Anderson, who paid $270 million and had grand plans to build on what they called Westralia Square.

In the early 1990s, plans for a $2-billion development by Indonesia's Samma Group fell through. Anderson later left the project, with Packer selling his Westralia Square investment in 2003 for $19 million, taking a loss of more than $200 million on the deal. The purchaser was a partnership of Multiplex and Ric Stowe.

In 2008 the City of Perth granted approval to Multiplex for the construction of a 46-storey tower block on the site for BHP. The approval included strict conditions on maintaining the heritage values of the buildings along St Georges Terrace, including Newspaper House, the Royal Insurance Building, the 1890s WA Trustee Co building and the Old Perth Technical School.

In October 2010, the four heritage buildings were advertised for lease as "heritage office space" and described as "meticulously restored" as part of the City Square development, which was completed in 2012 and renamed Brookfield Place. The developer, then known as Brookfield Multiplex, recycled the Old Perth Technical School and other heritage buildings in a "heritage-minded development" which included a complex of non-conforming contemporary-design stairways to provide direct street-front access to tenants.

== Heritage value ==
The 1910 Perth Technical School building was entered into the Register of the National Estate by the Australian Heritage Commission on 18 April 1989 and was classified by the National Trust (WA) on 14 June 2004. The building is also included on the City of Perth's Municipal Inventory and was interim listed on the State Register of Heritage Places on 9 January 1998.
