= Warren Anderson (Australian businessman) =

Australian businessman

- Born: Warren Perry Anderson; 1942 (age 83–84)
- Known for: Property development; Development of Coles and Kmart stores
- Notable work: Westralia Square
- Children: 4

Warren Perry Anderson (born 1942) is an Australian businessman and speculative investor whose net worth in 1990 was estimated by BRW at $190 million, although the following year he was reported to have debts of $500 million, and filed for bankruptcy.

He has been a principal in major developments in Perth, Darwin and Melbourne. He has owned properties such as The Marritz Hotel in Perisher Valley, Boomerang in Sydney and Tipperary, a premier cattle and crop station in the Northern Territory. He has claimed to have been unfairly stripped of A$50 million in the course of the WA Inc bailout of Rothwells, and was involved in the collapse of Firepower International.

== Career and associations ==
Anderson has been associated with some of Australia's largest developments – the $1 billion-plus Westralia Square skyscraper in Perth, 50 Coles and K mart supermarkets around Australia, the new Parliament House, Darwin and at least six major office blocks in the Melbourne central business district, including redevelopment of the Windsor Hotel site.

He has conducted dealings and partnerships with billionaire businessman Kerry Packer, John Roberts of the construction giant Multiplex, which built most of his developments, and WA Inc entrepreneur Alan Bond. His political networking led to close associations with prominent Australian Labor Party players Brian Burke, Paul Keating, Graham Richardson and many others.

=== Investment controversies ===
==== Rothwells loan ====
Anderson had extensive property interests in Western Australia and the Northern Territory, including a mansion in Peppermint Grove, Perth and the vast Tipperary Station group (1 million hectares) on which he assembled a collection of 2,000 exotic Asian and African animals, some of which he acquired from Lord Alistair McAlpine after he had to close his Pearl Coast Zoological Gardens in Broome in 1991. Anderson later sold the Tipperary property in 2003, after former manager Kevin Freeman accused him of neglecting his animals.

In association with Kerry Packer's Consolidated Press Holdings, he was negotiating a $270-million investment in a prime Perth central business district redevelopment prospect called Westralia Square, adjacent to the old Perth Technical School. He was persuaded to contribute $50 million to a bailout of Rothwells by premier Peter Dowding. Anderson had agreed to the condition to hand over the $50 million in return for a tender agreement for the Westralia Square site which was being put up for sale by the WA government. Packer declined to provide any of the $50 million attached to the deal. Anderson maintains that Dowding gave him a verbal assurance the state would guarantee return of his $50 million, but declined to put the agreement into writing. Anderson has been unsuccessful in a legal action to recover the funds and pursued an appeal in the High Court. In May 2010 the High Court rejected the appeal.

==== Westralia Square ====
As stated above, Anderson and Kerry Packer invested $270 million and had grand plans to build on what they called Westralia Square, which is centrally located in the Perth CBD but has limited frontage to the prime roadway, St Georges Terrace, owing to a group of heritage buildings which were preserved from demolition by public protest with agreement of the Perth City Council. Plans for a $2 billion development by Indonesia's Samma Group fell through. Unable to recoup his Rothwells funds, Anderson left the project. After 15 years, Packer was obliged to sell his Westralia Square investment for a mere $19 million, taking a loss of more than $200 million. The redevelopment was concluded in 2012 by Brookfield Multiplex who renamed it Brookfield Place.

==== Firepower fuel pill shares ====
During its 2008 investigation of the Australian operations of the fraudulent Firepower organisation, the Australian Securities & Investments Commission (ASIC) filed a Federal Court action against companies associated with Anderson and other directors and financial advisers alleged to have profited from sale of shares without the purchasers receiving a prospectus or appropriate information about the risk involved. (Anderson was not himself named as a defendant.) Anderson's company Owston Nominees was alleged to have been issued 40 million one-cent shares in Firepower's Virgin-Islands-based parent company Firepower BVI in June 2005, which were onsold for up to 50c a share.

In January 2010, Firepower's principal, Tim Johnston, said in court that he had been personally threatened with death by Anderson, who was alleged to have previously employed enforcers from bikie groups, and Sydney personality Tom Domican. The use of bikies as claimed by Tim Johnston was later described by Trevor Nairn as 'ridiculous' and 'offensive'.

== Personal life ==
Between 1980 and 2012 Anderson was an owner of Fernhill, a heritage-listed residence and 690-hectare (1,700-acre) property in Mulgoa.

In April 2010, Magistrate Pamela Hogan found Anderson not guilty of assaulting Mrs Bell, but guilty of assaulting his wife by grabbing her arm. After 42 years of marriage, the couple organised an auction sale of their 30-year collection of fine art and antiquities in 1,400 lots, described as "almost certainly the largest sale of fine art and antiquities in Australia", which realised A$13.1million.
