= Brookfield Place (Perth) =

Office tower in Perth, Western Australia

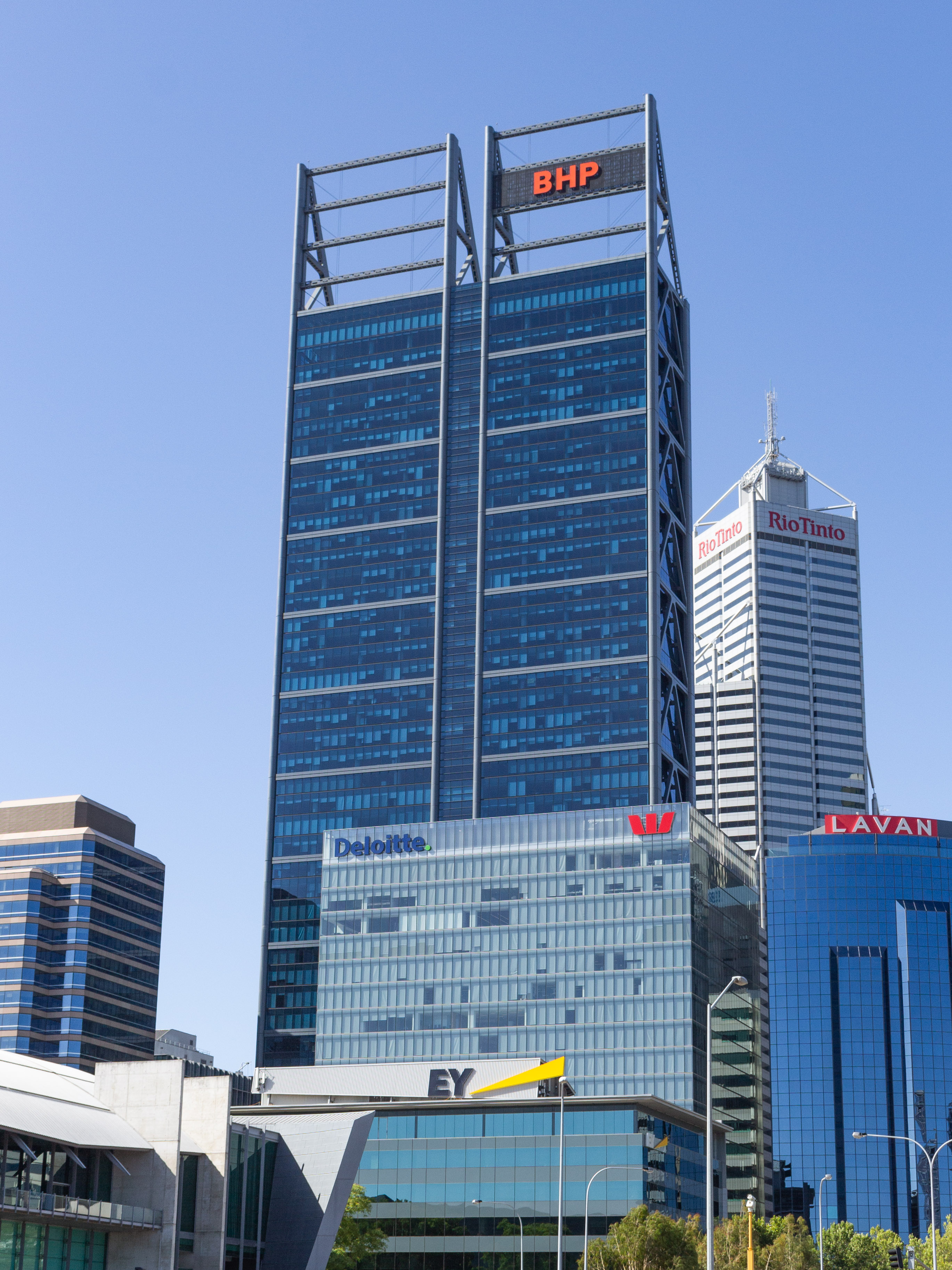
- Brookfield Place Tower 1 with Tower 2 in the midground

General information
- Status: Completed
- Type: Office
- Location: 125 St Georges Terrace, Perth, Western Australia
- Coordinates: 31°57′17.35″S 115°51′17.49″E
- Construction started: April 2008
- Completed: 2012
- Opening: 2012
- Cost: A$500M (est.)

Height
- Antenna spire: 244 m (800.52 ft)
- Roof: 204 m (669.29 ft)
- Top floor: 190 m (623.36 ft)

Technical details
- Floor count: 46
- Floor area: 71,000 m^{2} (760,000 sq ft)
- Lifts/elevators: 28

Design and construction
- Architects: Tower 1: Hassell, Fitzpatrick + Partners; Tower 2: Woods Bagot
- Developer: Brookfield Properties
- Main contractor: Brookfield Multiplex

Website
- bfplperth.com

Brookfield Place is a skyscraper within the Brookfield Place office complex in Perth, Western Australia. It is currently the second tallest building in Western Australia. It is located at 125 St Georges Terrace.

Construction commenced in April 2008 and was completed in 2012. The project is estimated to have cost around A$500 million. The major tenant is BHP; other tenants include PwC, Allianz, Barrick Gold, Navitas and Servcorp.

Developers Brookfield lodged a development application for the second stage of Brookfield Place in July 2011, for a 30,000-square-metre (320,000 sq ft) 16-storey office tower to be situated to the south of the main tower fronting Mounts Bay Road. Tower 2 was completed in 2015, with major tenants including Multiplex, Westpac, Wesfarmers, Ashurst, Corrs Chambers Westgarth and Deloitte.

Retail tenants in the Brookfield Place complex include Montblanc and Daniel Hechter.

== History ==
- 1986 - Laurie Connell and Alan Bond both buy 25% stakes in the site in 1986 in partnership with the State Superannuation Board, as part of WA Inc.
- 1988 - The site, then part of the Perth Technical College site, was sold to Kerry Packer and Warren Anderson for A$270 million. One office building on what was renamed Westralia Square was constructed. The development is mired in WA state politics, and the deal will later be scrutinised in detail by the WA Inc Royal Commission. Kerry Packer famously declares: "All West [sic] Australians are crooks."
- 1990s - A$2-billion development by Indonesia's Samma Group collapses.
- 2003 - Kerry Packer sells the site to Multiplex and Stowe for A$19 million, taking a loss of A$200 million. Multiplex and Griffin agree to carve up the Westralia Square property. Griffin has a smaller area on Mounts Bay Road and Multiplex has the prime location fronting St Georges Terrace.
- December 2007 - BHP signs the biggest office leasing deal in Perth's history—60,000 m^{2} (650,000 sq ft).
- March 2008 - Perth's Lord Mayor announces that BHP will be headquartering in Perth, and their Melbourne operations will be significantly downgraded. (This is confirmed in August 2014.)

== Design ==
Brookfield Place Tower is the tallest side core commercial building in the southern hemisphere and in the world. Designed by Hassell and Fitzpatrick + Partners, it included the restoration of the surrounding historic Newspaper House Group of Buildings, comprising four heritage-listed buildings, constructed between 1910 and 1932.

The offset core protects the enclosed space by buffering the façade against the adverse northern sun and the associated solar heat gain. Externally, the expressive structural east and west exoskeletons create the distinctive tower aesthetic. The vertical expression of the tower structure accentuates the height of the building, which terminates in a tapered structural roof crown.

Tower 2 was designed by Woods Bagot. It features large column-free floor plates of approximately 2,100 square metres (23,000 sq ft). The project also incorporates a sheltered upper-level walkway across Mounts Bay Road to provide greater connectivity between the Elizabeth Quay bus station, Elizabeth Quay railway station and Perth's CBD.

== Gallery ==
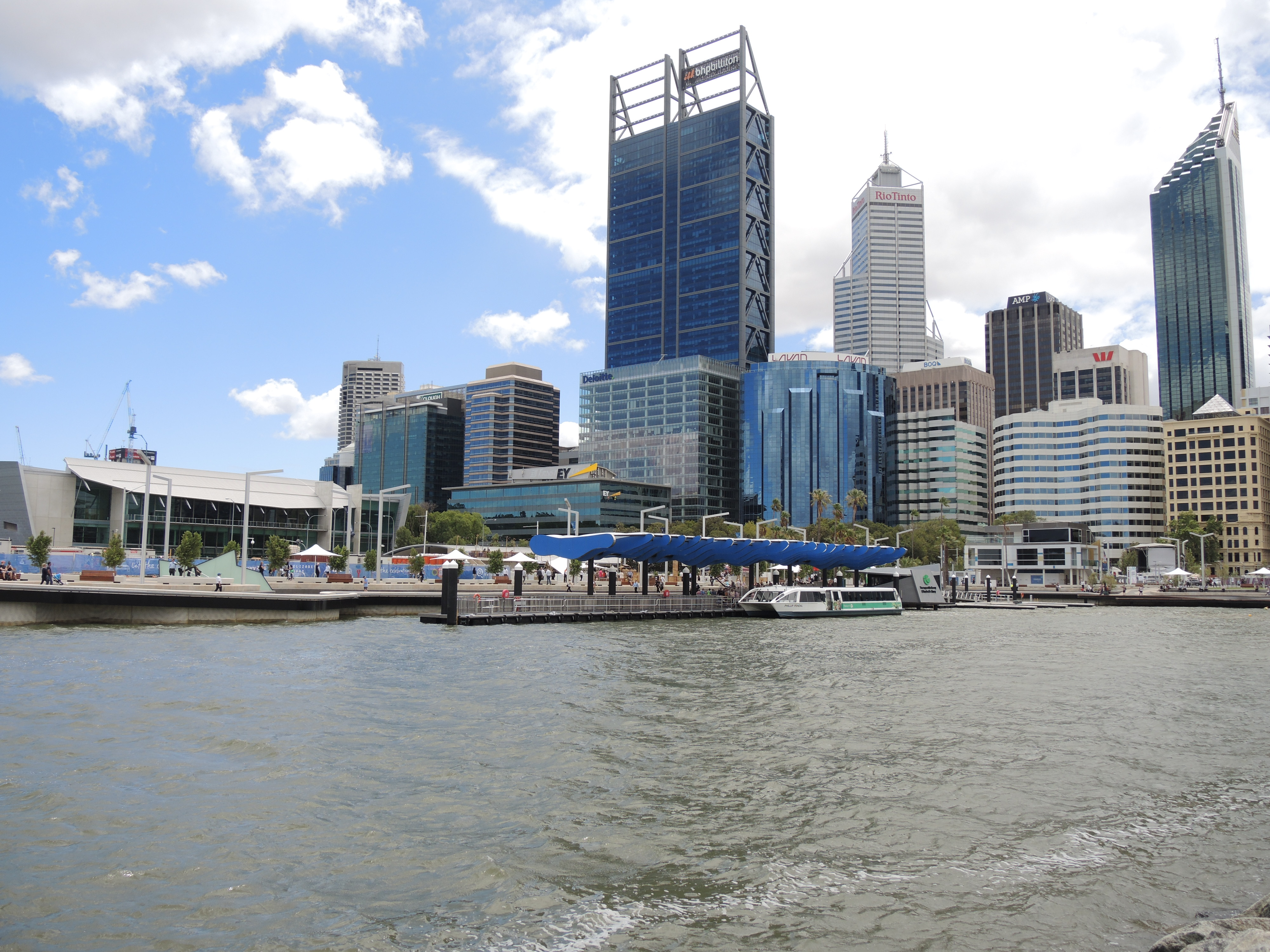

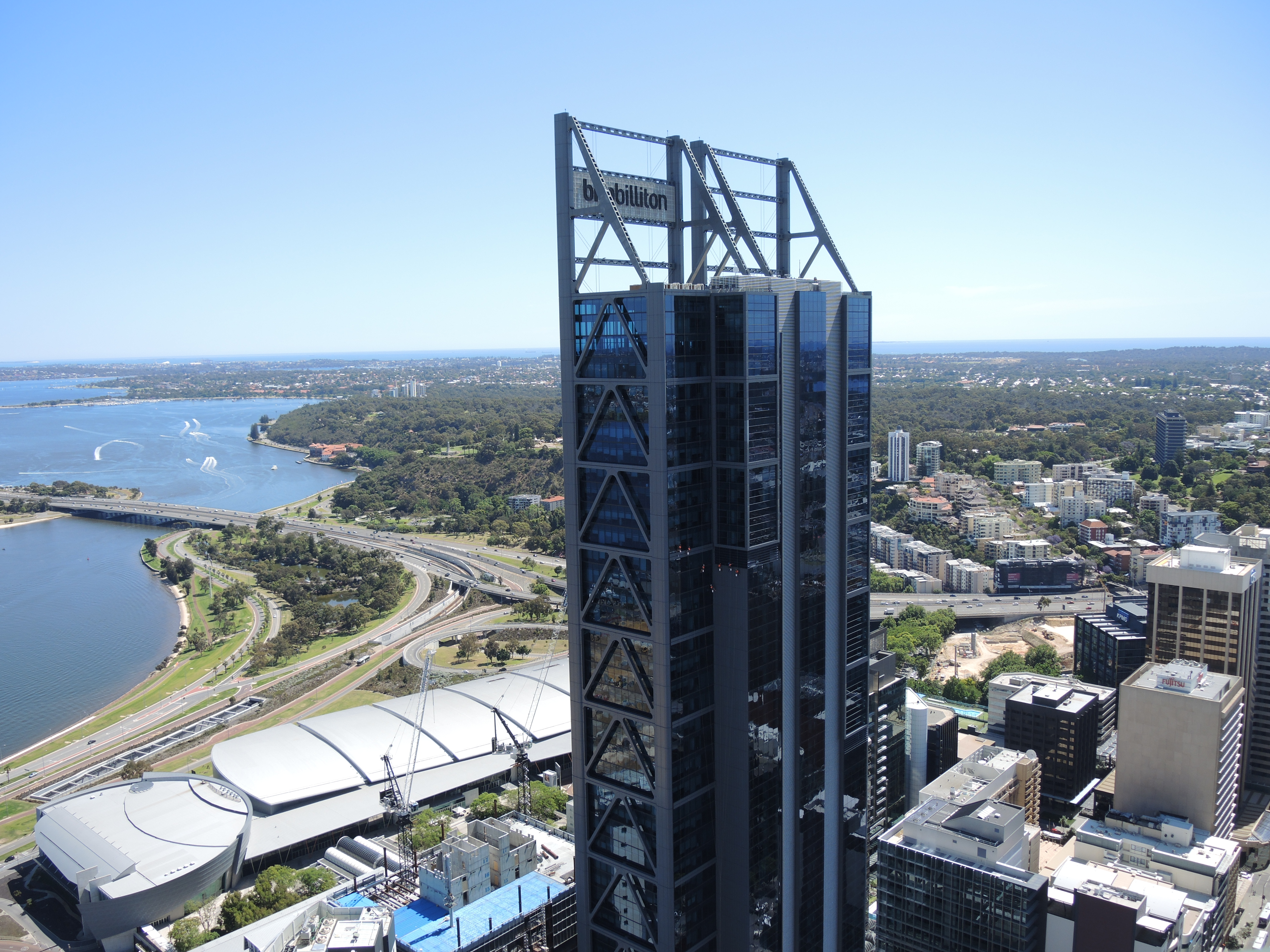

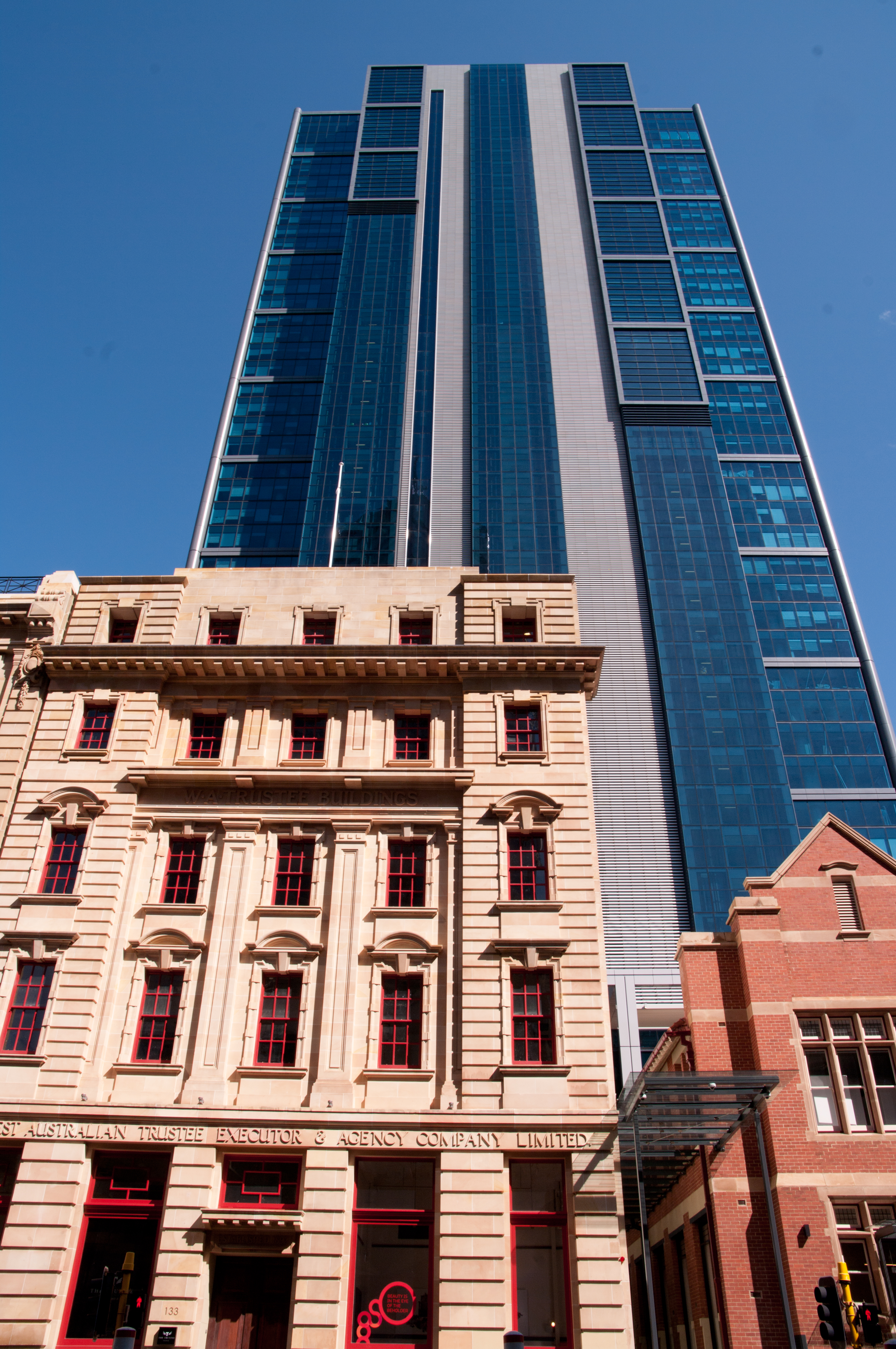

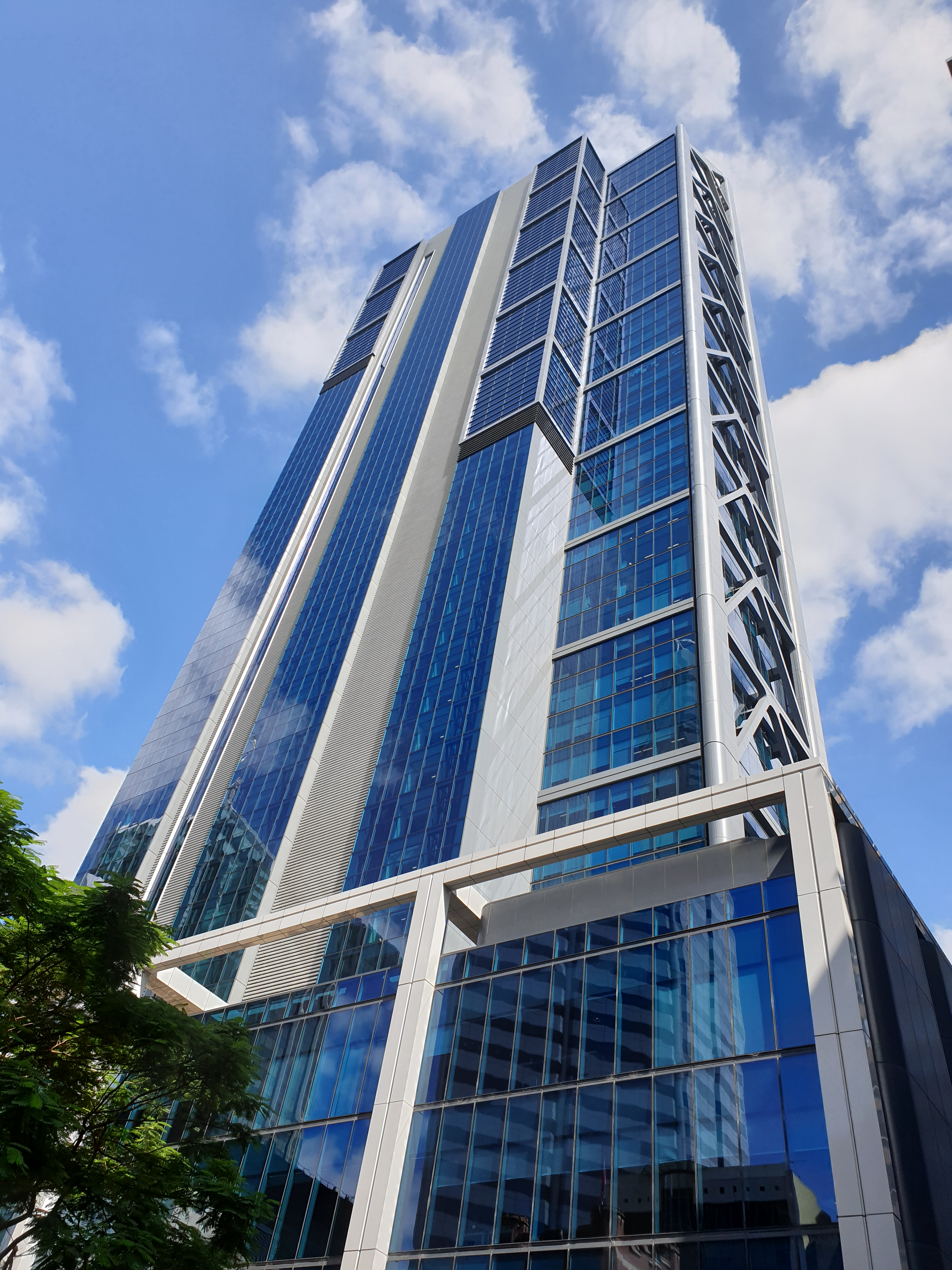

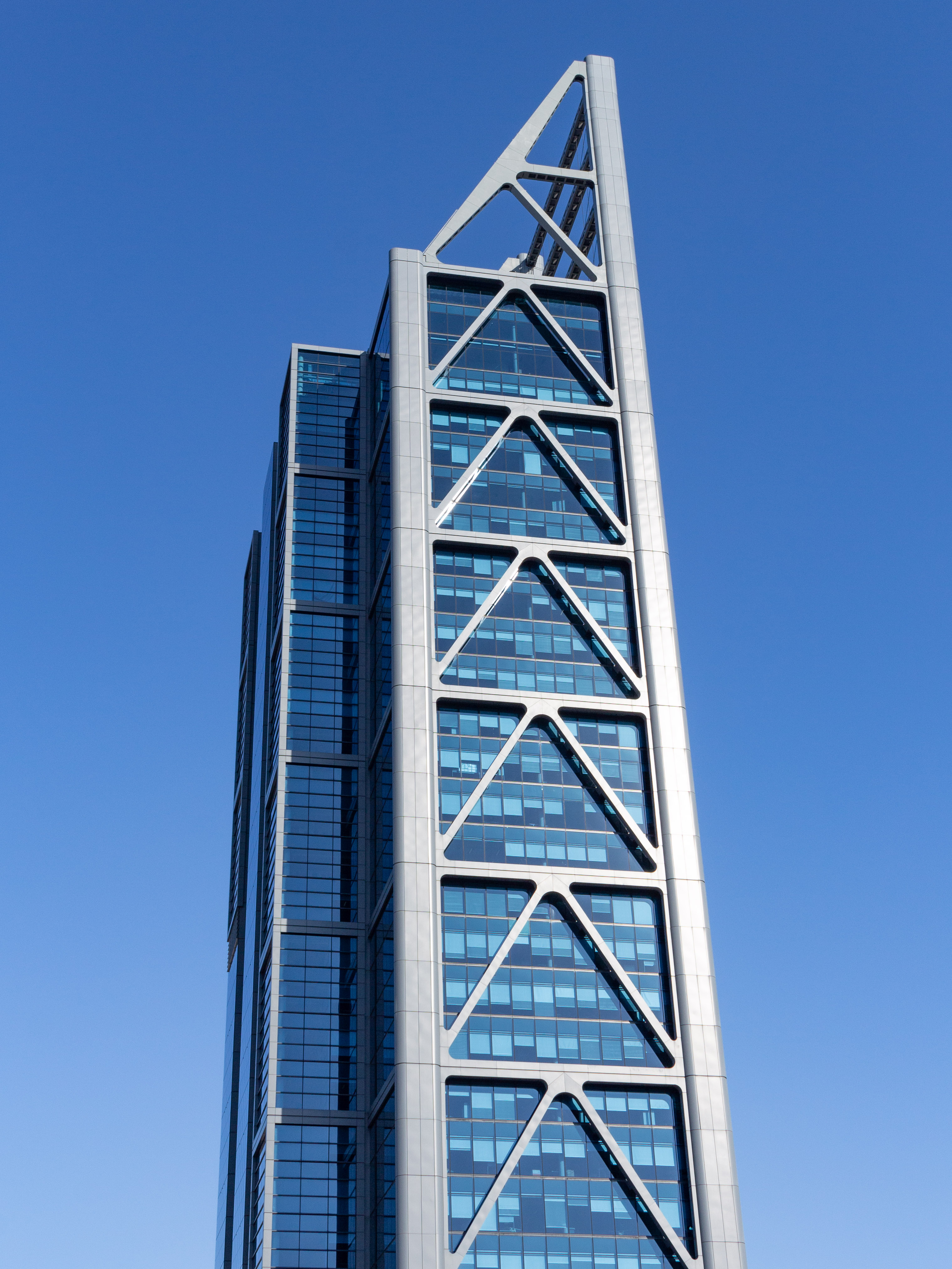

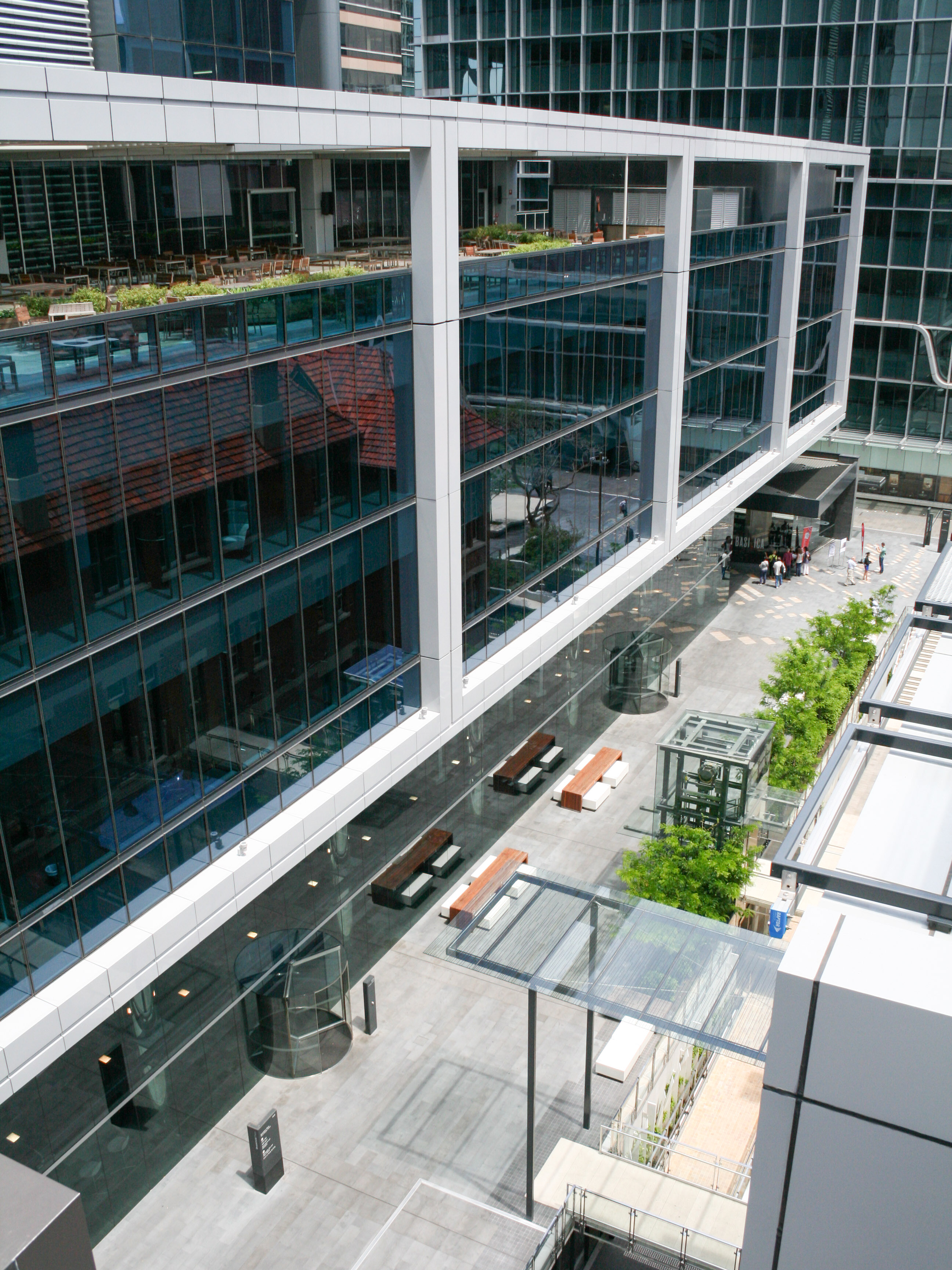

== See also ==
- List of lanes and arcades in Perth, Western Australia
- List of tallest buildings in Perth
- List of tallest buildings in Australia
- Old Perth Technical School
- Old Perth Boys School
- Print Hall
