= Boomerang, Elizabeth Bay =

Boomerang
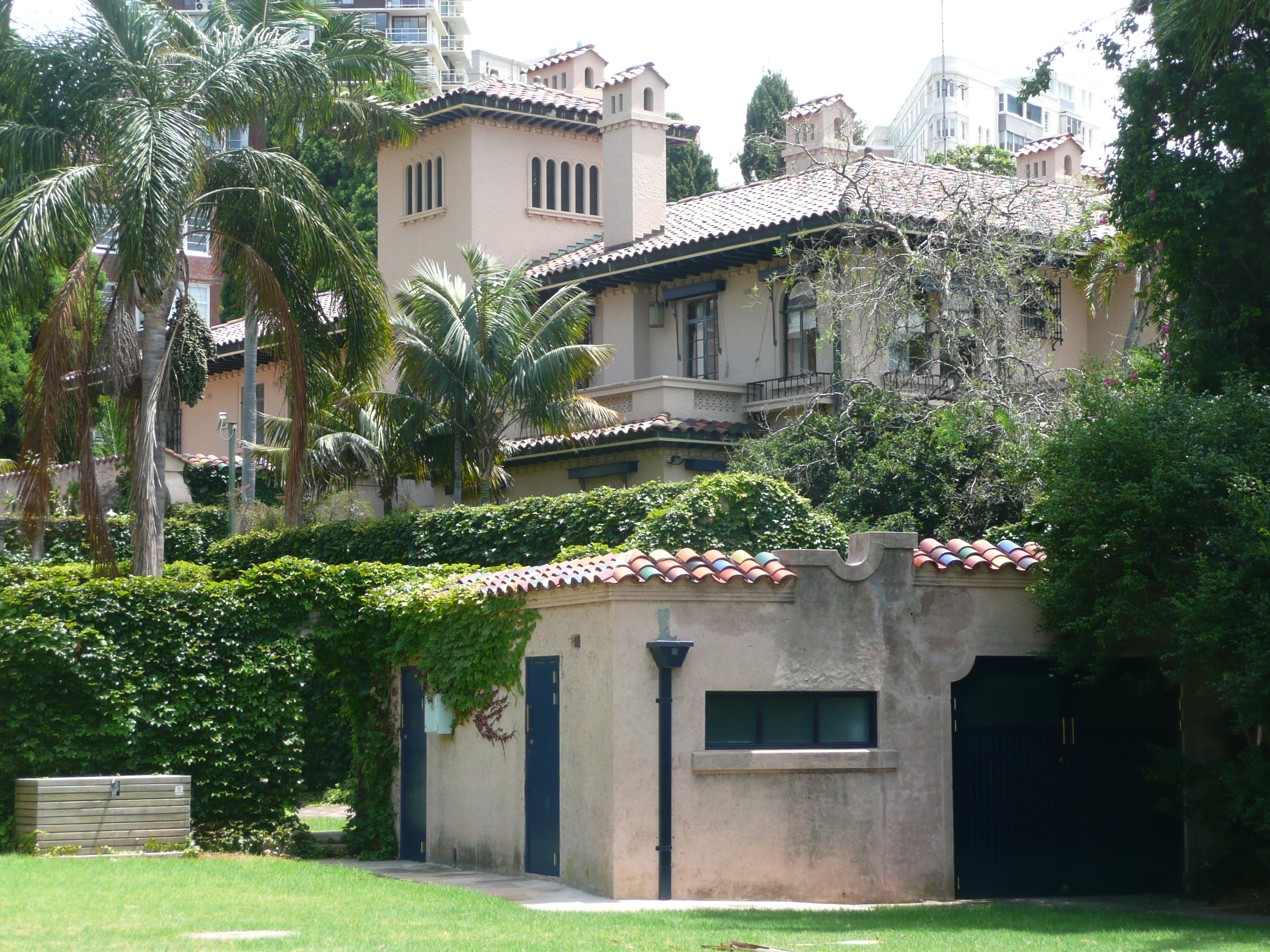
- Boomerang as seen from Beare Park

- Location within Sydney Location within Australia
- 33.8702°S 151.2282°E
- Location: 42 Billyard Avenue, Elizabeth Bay, City of Sydney, New South Wales, Australia

History
- Built: 1926–1928
- Built for: Frank Albert

Site notes
- Architects: Neville Hampson (house); Max Shelley (and possibly Hampson and Mr A. J. Doust) (garden/grounds)
- Architectural style: Spanish Mission

New South Wales Heritage Register
- Official name: Boomerang
- Type: State heritage (complex / group)
- Designated: 2 April 1999
- Reference no.: 38
- Type: Garden Residential
- Category: Parks, Gardens and Trees

Boomerang is a heritage-listed private house and garden located at 42 Billyard Avenue in the inner eastern Sydney suburb of Elizabeth Bay, New South Wales, Australia. The house was designed by Neville Hampson and the gardens and grounds by Max Shelley (and possibly Hampson and A. J. Doust), and built from 1926 to 1928.

The first owner was Frank Albert, a music publisher, who resided at Boomerang until his death in 1962. The house remained closed with a caretaker until 1978. From 1978-96 a range of owners bought and subdivided it, creating lots to the east on Ithaca Gardens, and part was acquired by Sydney City Council to extend Beare Park to avert an unsympathetic proposed block of flats to its north-east.

Boomerang was added to the New South Wales State Heritage Register on 2 April 1999. The house has been ranked as one of the most expensive houses in Sydney.

The house was used as a set for the film Mission: Impossible 2. In 2011 the garden was redesigned by Myles Baldwin.

== History ==
=== History of the suburb ===
Elizabeth Bay had been the site of a fishing village established by Governor Macquarie (1810–21) in c. 1815 for a composite group of Cadigal people – the indigenous inhabitants of the area surrounding Sydney Harbour – under the leadership of Bungaree (d.1830). Elizabeth Bay was named in honour of Elizabeth Macquarie. Bungaree's group continued their nomadic life around the harbour foreshores. Sir Thomas Brisbane, Governor 1821–25, designated Elizabeth Bay as the site of an asylum for the insane. A pen sketch by Edward Mason from 1822–23 shows a series of bark huts for the natives' in the locality.

Governor Darling granted Colonial Secretary Alexander Macleay 22 hectares (54 acres) at Elizabeth Bay in 1826. From 1826–1926 the subject land was part of the Macleay family's Elizabeth Bay estate garden, in which Alexander built his mansion in the 1830s to the west. Built well before the house, the estate was widely considered at the time (1820s onward) as "the finest house and garden in the colony" and had a number of areas, in gardenesque style. Its walled "orchard /orangery" was the harbour-side part in which Boomerang was later constructed.

After Alexander's bankruptcy, son George subdivided and sold leaseholds between 1865–82. Billyard Avenue was formed to access some of the earliest allotments. In 1875 his cousin, William John Macleay, acquired the lease of blocks on the corner of Ithaca Road and Billyard Avenue. This allowed him to build his Macleayan Museum for his natural history collections, which had been previously stored in Elizabeth Bay House. These collections were transferred to the Macleayan Museum at the University of Sydney in 1888. William John Macleay constructed a building for the Linnean Society of NSW on an adjacent block in 1885. Several trees possibly from the grounds of the Linnean Hall remain today - some on Boomerang include an old avocado (Persea gratissima) and a large mango (Mangifera indica) on the external southern (street-side) front wall on the south-east side of the entry gate. These trees are difficult to discern in photographs of the front garden of 1926 & 1929.

Also possibly from this time/Macleay ownership period is a large camellia (C.japonica) in front garden on W side of carriage drive near gate (this tree/shrub is at least 1920s, possibly older, and the Macleays were noted camellia enthusiasts/hybridisers at Camden Park Estate). Outside Boomerang remnants of the Linnean Hall grounds include a remnant black bean tree (Castanospermum australe) and Moreton Bay fig (Ficus macrophylla) line the southern street boundary of adjacent Billyard Avenue properties to the west. Other estate remains elsewhere include a grotto (part natural sandstone cliff overhang, part carved niche and details, and sections of an elaborate sandstone steps and a retaining wall and balustrade, behind (south) of Art Deco flats across (south of) Billyard Avenue.

=== Boomerang ===
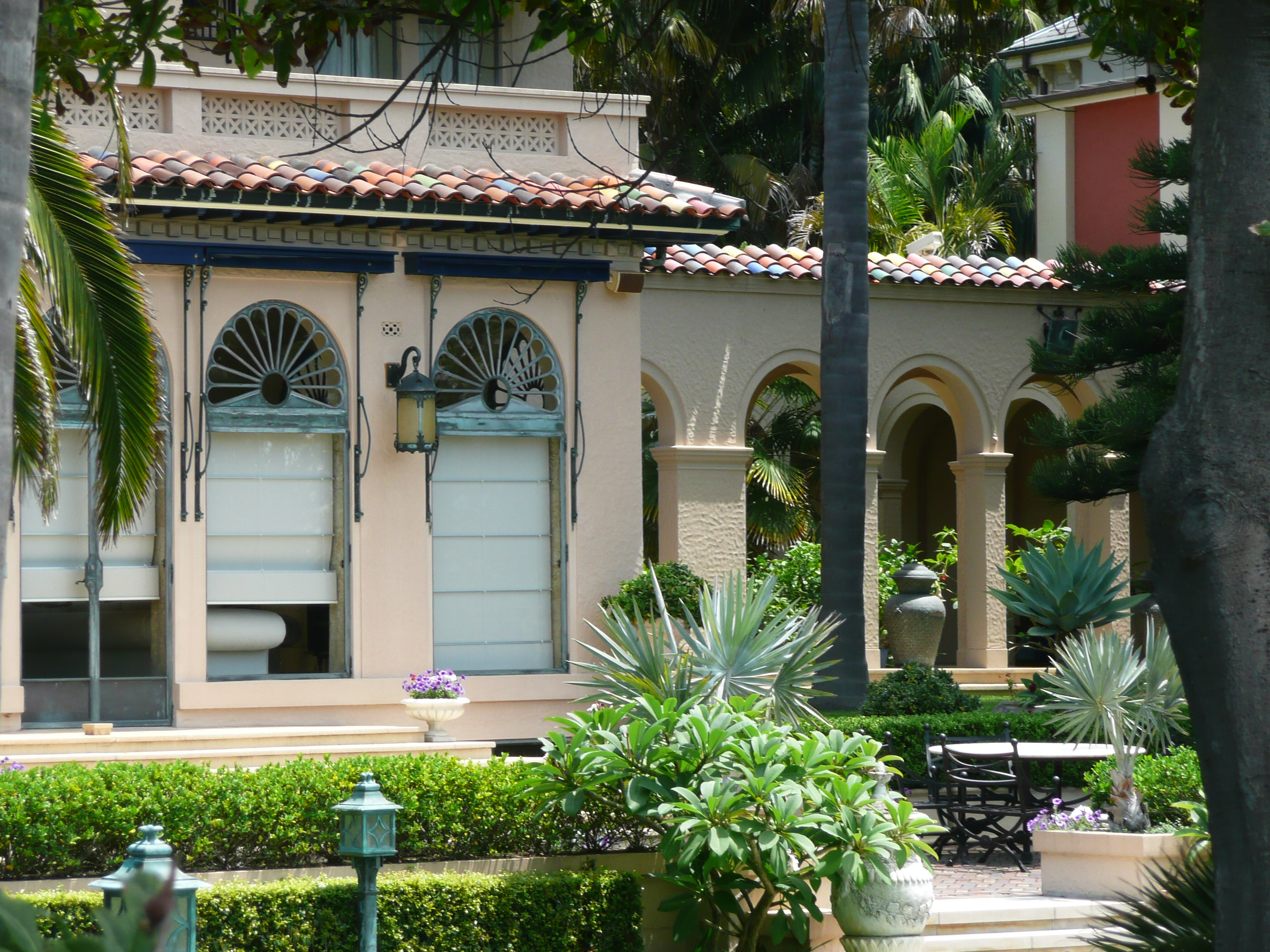
Boomerang as seen from Sydney Harbour.

==== Albert family ====
The house was constructed in 1926 for Frank Albert, a music publisher; its architect was Neville Hampson; its garden was designed by M. R. (Max) Shelley, possibly in conjunction with Hampson. It was built on the site of an earlier house called Boomerang, being one of a row of Edwardian homes built on an 1875 subdivision of Elizabeth Bay estate. Frank Albert himself had married and built a two-storey brick house in 1902, which he demolished to make way for the newer homestead, also called Boomerang. Albert Music began importing and selling a wide range of musical instruments including a Boomerang mouth organ. The company trademarked the word 'boomerang' and stamped it on German manufactured mouth organs. The distinctive instruments were a run away success selling at a rate of 800 a week by 1897.

Mr A. J. Doust, a landscape gardener active in the Eastern Suburbs in the late 1920s and 1930s is also known to have worked on Boomerangs grounds, perhaps on its maintenance or adaptations as plantings matured.

The private cinema is one of few in Australia and appears a miniature version of the State or the Regent Theatres. It was hailed as one of the wonders of the cinematic world, when it opened in 1928. It was never open to the public and few but the privileged guests at Sunday evening screenings, knew of its existence. Programmes were given out to guests attending sessions. It had burgundy velvet curtains, over 400 concealed lights (both curtains and lights could be centrally controlled by one person from the projection booth), sat 200 (in 1980 the seats had been removed) and was meticulously detailed, with a suite of film processing laboratories and dark rooms behind the projection room. A contemporary film magazine, commenting at the time of its opening, described the set up as the most extravagant in Australia and went on to call it "the best motion picture outfit in the world".

The garden and Shelley's involvement were featured in an article in magazine The Home of 1 February 1929, with photographs by Harold Cazneaux. Clearly based on Hollywood mansions of the period and well known in Sydney society at the time, Boomerang was the scene of much entertaining (Albert had a private cinema built in the basement for guests) and subsequent to his death, to much land speculation. The garden, by then-popular designer Max Shelley, contained myriad sun loving shrubs and perennials. Due to the growth of shade trees, the return to a sun-loving garden is no longer a possibility. Shelley's original planting plan turned out to be unsuccessful for Boomerang and changes were made soon after the garden's original concept.

Albert also reputedly owned the adjoining 1880s property to the west, today called Berthong, on which the boathouse of Boomerang survives today. A 1936 aerial photograph by J M Leonard shows Boomerang's formal cruciform harbour-front garden, flanked by palms and shrubberies, with Berthongs open lawn to the west, and another house (later demolished) immediately to the east on what is today Beare Park. Albert was well known in Sydney yachting circles, owning the very large yacht, "Boomerang", which he raced, moored at his private jetty, and stowed below the house in a specially designed area. This boat is today part of the Sydney heritage fleet. This vessel, originally named Bona, was designed by naval architect Walter Reeks and built in 1903. After having had several owners in Melbourne and Sydney it was sold to Frank Albert in 1929, who changed its name to Boomerang. It remained in the Albert family until 1987 when it was presented to the Sydney Heritage Fleet, which has restored it.

Albert resided at Boomerang until his death in 1962, after which the house remained closed with a caretaker until 1978.

==== Subsequent ownership ====
In 1978 Boomerang was sold to speculators Tom Hayson and son Ian, who quickly subdivided the estate (creating the lots to the east on Ithaca Road), and part which was acquired by Sydney City Council for an extension of Beare Park. (2008–09 works by the City of Sydney Council have interpreted Boomerang's former tennis court on this part of the park, along with earlier slip ways and accesses to the harbour.

Also in 1978 the house and c. four thousand and forty-seven square metres (one acre) with three-car garage and chauffeur's quarters were sold to oil recycler Peter Burnett and wife Astrid, becoming reputedly Sydney's and Australia's first million dollar sale at $1.2 million (or $1.5m). The Dawsons redecorated at some expense. In 1980 the property was auctioned but was passed in.

Warren Anderson, a property developer from Western Australia, bought Boomerang in 1981 (as well as Glenmore and Fernhill estates in the Mulgoa Valley south of Penrith and Tipperary pastoral stations in the Northern Territory).

In 1981 it was sold to businessman Peter Fox, then a financier of films. In July 1982 it was sold after Fox's death in a car accident to bookmaker Mark Read, who installed the swimming pool on the northern lawn, relocating the sundial to a garden bed in the north-east corner.

In 1985 it was sold to property developer Warren Anderson, and expansively furnished with Regency antiques, paintings and French empire clocks. In 1991 Boomerang was listed for auction but did not attract a buyer. In September 1993 the Bank of New York took possession, after public legal disputes with Anderson. The property was listed for mortgagee auction. Tense competing teams of security guards had a stand off before the auction, triggering Supreme Court of New South Wales proceedings to evict Anderson. In 1993 telephone pager entrepreneur Nati Stoliar and his wife Miki bought the property.

Malcolm Turnbull was once interested in buying the prestigious pile. Post 1996 it was sold to Hong Kong based expatriate funds manager Duncan Mount and wife Sally for $15m. Major improvements to the property were carried out under their ownership (including the butler's quarters/garage being converted into guest quarters).

In 2000 Boomerang was listed for auction, selling in early 2002 to cleaning contractors, John and Julie Schaeffer. Schaeffer was also the owner of Bellevue Hill mansion, Rona.

Boomerang was sold in March 2005 for $20m to billionaire Melbourne trucking magnate, Lindsay Fox of Linfox, who placed the property in his daughter Katrina's name.

== Description ==
=== House ===
The house is a Spanish Mission mansion, completed in the Inter-war Spanish Mission style (c. 1915 – c. 1940) and Spanish Revival Style. It exemplifies the Hollywood-derived taste for the Spanish mission style in a pastiche of palms, splashing fountains and "Spanish" architectural details such as perforated screens, rough stucco, colonnades, grilles, loggias and barley twist columns, combining to provide one of the most successful examples of this style (RAIA).

The three-storey masonry structure is rendered on external walls, with either ceramic tiled, timber panelled, fabric wallpapered, or plastered walls within. The house has 25 main rooms, six bathrooms, four kitchens, and covers a total of 100-square-metre (1,100 sq ft).

The floors on the ground level are limestone paved (entry lobby is travertine), high-quality timber parquetry in the dining room, former library, central lobby (former dining room), and upstairs bedrooms of English oak with black ebony and American walnut borders.

Three bedrooms are on the upper floor, as is a servant's bedroom (no.4). All four bedrooms have ensuites/attached bathrooms, mostly original with some 1980s/90s fittings added (vanities etc.). All bathrooms are elaborately tiled with gold, iridescent blue, or green, or plain white tiles. Three main bedrooms all have inbuilt wardrobes in painted cabinetry, the main bedroom having an unusual fold-out door with two-full-length leaf mirrors, and a revolving five-tiered hat stand.

Two internal staircases access the upper floor, a major and a minor one. The major one is made of marble and bronze.

The lower ground level has a private cinema. Roof tiles are Wunderlich multi-coloured glazed terracotta Cordoba tiles. The property has much external and internal detail work in wrought iron - window grilles, door screens, and light fittings. The house has bespoke decorative panel work on walls, floors and ceilings in coloured glazed ceramic tiles, timber, plaster and terrazzo. External walls have iron grilles in "portholes" of different shapes, with wooden or iron grille gates (two for vehicular entry), and one wooden gate for pedestrian entry off Billyard Avenue.

=== Garage/Butler's Quarters ===
There is a separate garage/butler's quarters on the corner of Billyard Avenue/Ithaca Road, which were converted into garage/guests' quarters in the 1990s.

=== Garden ===
Elements of Boomerang's garden may relate to its pre-1926 use (between 1826 and 1926) as part of Alexander Macleay's 22-hectare (54-acre) Elizabeth Bay estate garden. Boomerang's lot before subdivision was part of the estate's enclosed kitchen garden/orchard/orangery. George Macleay subdivided and sold leaseholds of the estate between 1865 and 1882.

In 1875 his cousin, William John Macleay, acquired the lease of blocks on the corner of Ithaca Road and Billyard Avenue. This allowed him to build his Macleayan Museum for his natural history collections, which had been previously stored in Elizabeth Bay House. These collections were transferred to the Macleayan Museum at the University of Sydney in 1888. William John Macleay constructed a building for the Linnean Society of NSW on an adjacent block in 1885. Several trees which may date from the grounds of the Linnean Hall remain today – some on Boomerang include an old avocado tree (Persea gratissima) and a large mango tree (Mangifera indica) on the external southern (streetside) front wall on the SE side of the entry gate. Both of these latter trees are difficult to discern in photographs of the front garden of Boomerang of 1926 and 1929. The mango tree is a magnificent and densely crowned tree. It is possibly the largest specimen of this species in the City of Sydney local government area. The avocado appears to be in serious decline. Early Linnean Society grounds elements noted to survive in a 2000 Historic Houses Trust book "Elizabeth Bay House – a guide" include a Norfolk Island hibiscus, (Lagunaria patersonae).

Also possibly from this time/Macleay ownership period is a large camellia (C.japonica) in front garden on the west side of carriage drive near gate (this tree/shrub is at least 1920s, possibly older, and the Macleays were noted Camellia enthusiasts/hybridisers at Camden Park estate).

Outside Boomerang remnants of the Linnean Hall grounds include a remnant black bean tree (Castanospermum australe) and Moreton Bay fig (Ficus macrophylla) line the southern street boundary of adjacent Billyard Avenue properties to the west. Other estate remains elsewhere include a grotto (part natural sandstone cliff overhang, part carved niche and details, and sections of an elaborate sandstone steps and a retaining wall and balustrade, behind (south) of Art Deco flats across (south of) Billyard Avenue. While much more lush, dense and shady than its early planting appears due to additional plantings probably from the 1980s/90s, the mature garden retains its overall character with a Mediterranean/ Hollywood/Islamic flavour and a combination of palms, cypresses, dense tree and English flower planting. Today the dominant theme is subtropical. The original garden was designed and planted by landscape architect M. R. (Max) Shelley, perhaps in combination with architect Neville Hampson. Shelley's liberal use of subtropical species - Lord Howe (Howea fosteriana/H.belmoreana) & Cocos Island (Syragus romanzoffianum) palms, ornamental bananas (Musa spp./cv.s), araucarias (Norfolk Island pine - A.heterophylla in particular), Mediterranean cypresses (Cupressus sempervirens), Chusan or Chinese fan palms (Trachycarpus fortunei), New Zealand cabbage trees (Cordyline australis) and a Mediterranean/Hollywood/Islamic flavour remains today. Mediterranean cypresses have been replaced by the wider growing Bhutan cypresses (C.torulosa) and Chinese fan palms today.

A large urban residential garden, the structure of the garden is defined by the built elements, in particular the walls, entry drive in herringbone brick, courtyards (e.g.: cloister garden to the west with crazy paving in sandstone), terraces in herringbone brick, ponds (a large rectangular sunken pool in the front garden lined with glazed ceramic blue tiles, a smaller circular sunken pool near the entry portico in multicoloured ceramic mosaic) and external spaces of the garden. The garden retains many of the original planted "structure" of trees and shrubs.

Some 1926 plantings remain, including a collection of palms, Lord Howe Island /curly/sentry palms, Cocos Island palms, pygmy date palms (Phoenix roebelenii, one in the western courtyard), Chusan, windmill or Chinese fan palms (the two windmill palms are amongst the largest known in the City of Sydney local government area), a large and prominent Norfolk Island pine north of the courtyard to the house's west (this is a tall, emergent specimen and the most visually prominent component of the garden when viewed from the harbour), Canary Island date palms (Phoenix canariensis) in the rear garden, Bhutan cypresses (Cupressus torulosa), Alexandra palms (Archontophoenix alexandrae), Queensland nut/macadamia, (M.integrifolia).

Many landscape details remain intact from the 1926 original, including multicoloured herringbone brick paving carriage loop and other brick/tile/concrete paving, sandstone crazy paved base to sundial and benches, wrought iron railings, fences and gates, colonnaded courtyard to west, service courtyard to east, matching sandstone benches on the northern lawn, sandstone and bronze sundial, square Moorish concrete and multicoloured ceramic tile planter tubs north of the house on the terrace, original plastered walls with window grills, doors (e.g.: to south street side, to the north east to former tennis court now public park), former tennis court sheds attached to walls (now within public park), northern terrace, standard steel pole lights throughout, sandstone steps to northern lawn, SE corner colonnaded pergola in iron and timber, boatshed/house/studio (now part of neighbouring property), sea wall, jetty, ceramic tiled and sandstone ponds, fountains (one in courtyard to south, another in courtyard to west, one on entrance lobby wall with Aboriginal face), terrazzo steps (to western courtyard, to northern terrace, in porte cochere.

=== Condition ===
Garden

A relatively high degree of design and layout intactness to original design, some planting modification and some structural, generally sympathetic and of a high quality matching original. The central sundial on the northern lawn has been relocated to the side garden in the NE corner and a swimming pool was placed centrally in the lawn. The four crazy paved paths that led to the former sundial are gone, although the sundial base and benches bases still use sandstone crazy paving. While much more lush, dense and shady than its early planting appears, the mature garden retains its overall character with a Mediterranean/ Hollywood/Islamic flavour and a combination of palms, cypresses, dense tree and English flower planting. Today the dominant theme is subtropical. Shelley's 1926 flower details have gone, along with the sun levels depleting as trees grew. 1980s changes put some colour back into the garden, which by then was overgrown and shady – including oleanders, cliveas. Shelley's 1926 Mediterranean cypresses have been replaced by the wider growing Bhutan cypresses and Chinese fan palms today.

Older elements predating 1926 may remain from Alexander Macleay's former Elizabeth Bay estate, of which this section formed part of the orangery/orchard, and was close to the former Linnean Society Hall and garden. These include a large mango tree, Mangifera indica and an avocado, Persea gratissima growing against the external wall on the south-east side of the eastern entry gate. Early elements claimed to survive in a 2000 Historic Houses Trust book "Elizabeth Bay House – a guide" include the mango, a Queensland black bean, Castanospermum australe) and a Norfolk Island hibiscus, (Lagunaria patersonae).

Some 1926 plantings remain, including a collection of palms, Lord Howe Island palms, (Howea fosteriana/belmoreana), Cocos Island palms, (Cocos romanzoffianum), pygmy date palms (one in the western courtyard) (Phoenix roebelenii), Chamaedorea costaricana, Chinese fan palms, (Trachycarpus fortunei), a Norfolk Island pine, Araucaria heterophylla, north of the courtyard to the house's west, Canary Island date palms, (Phoenix canariensis), Bhutan cypresses, (Cupressus torulosa), Queensland nut/macadamia, (M.tetraphylla).

Many landscape details remain intact from the 1926 original, including multicoloured herringbone brick paving carriage loop and other brick/tile/concrete paving, sandstone crazy paved base to sundial and benches, wrought iron railings, fences and gates, colonnaded courtyard to west, service courtyard to east, matching sandstone benches on the northern lawn, sandstone and bronze sundial, square Moorish concrete and multicoloured ceramic tile planter tubs north of the house on the terrace, original plastered walls with window grills, doors (e.g.: to south street side, to NE to former tennis court now public park), former tennis court sheds attached to walls (now within public park), northern terrace, standard steel pole lights throughout, sandstone steps to northern lawn, SE corner colonnaded pergola in iron and timber, boatshed/house/studio (now part of neighbouring property), sea wall, jetty, ceramic tiled and sandstone ponds, fountains (one in courtyard to south, another in courtyard to west, one on entrance lobby wall with Aboriginal face), terrazzo steps (to western courtyard, to northern terrace, in porte cochere).

2005 changes

Front garden (to street) – two paths flanking ornamental pool removed. Pool lined and retiled with different tiles. Dead Citrus tree, African olive, Illawarra flame tree removed. Significant groundcover replanting with star jasmine, Clivia cv.s. New box hedging added around ornamental pool. Two large new Canary Island palms added at southern end of pool, symmetrically, replacing two Chinese fan palms which were relocated.

=== Modifications and dates ===
Pre 1926 this section of Alexander Macleay's Elizabeth Bay estate was part of its enclosed kitchen garden/orchard/orangery. Possible remnants surviving today (on Boomerang) include an old avocado tree (Persea gratissima) and a mango (Mangifera indica) on the southern (streetside) front wall, east of the main entry, possibly also a large camellia (C.japonica) in front garden on W side of carriage drive near gate (this tree/shrub dates at least to the 1920s, possibly older, and the Macleays were noted Camellia enthusiasts/hybridisers, e.g.: William at Camden Park). Outside Boomerang a remnant black bean tree (Castanospermum australe) and Moreton Bay fig (Ficus macrophylla) overhang Billyard Avenue properties to the west – these were both possibly Macleay estate tree remnants. Other estate remains include a grotto (part natural sandstone cliff overhang, part carved niche and details, and sections of an elaborate sandstone steps and a retaining wall and balustrade, behind (south) of Art Deco flats across (south of) Billyard Avenue.

1926 Boomerang's house was built; its architect was Neville Hampson; and garden/courtyards made around it, richly planted by landscape designer Max Shelley, possibly in conjunction with Hampson. It was built on the site of an earlier house called "Boomerang", being one of a row of Edwardian homes built on an 1875 subdivision of Elizabeth Bay House estate, Colonial Secretary Alexander Macleay's grand gardenesque folly, widely considered at the time (1820s onward) as "the finest house and garden in the colony".

Mr A. J. Doust, a landscape gardener active in the Eastern Suburbs in the late 1920s and 1930s is also known to have worked on Boomerang's grounds, perhaps on its maintenance or adaptations as plantings matured.

The garden and Shelley's involvement were featured in an article in magazine "The Home" of 1 February 1929, with photographs by Harold Cazneaux. Clearly based on Hollywood mansions of the period and well known in Sydney society at the time, Boomerang was the scene of much entertaining (Albert had a private cinema built in the basement for guests) and subsequent to his death, to much land speculation.

Albert also reputedly owned the adjoining property to the west, today called "Berthong", on which the boathouse of Boomerang survives today. A 1936 aerial photograph by J M Leonard shows Boomerang's formal cruciform harbour-front garden, flanked by palms and shrubberies, with Berthong's open lawn to the west, and another house (later demolished) immediately to the east (on what is today Beare Park. The date of demolition of this house to the east is not known, but external walls lining its block relate directly to Boomerang in style and materials, and this may have been acquired by Albert and demolished for a tennis court, which was walled, with a door to Ithaca Road, which survives in Beare Park west today, as does the southern perimeter wall, and western wall, with grilled gate and steps into Boomerang.

- 1970s makeover to landscape south of (now) pool on northern (rear) yard.
- 1978 estate subdivided (lots to east on Ithaca Road created)
- 1980 private cinema – seats removed; at this time the burgundy velvet curtains were still in place; the projection room still had canisters of film stacked on the floor, beside the old fashioned Cummings & Wilson projectors which hadn't been used in years.
- post 1982 (& pre 1989) northern lawn modified to install swimming pool, Seafront rose garden removed, removed crazy paved cruciform paths, and relocating sundial to north-east garden bed.
- c. 1989–90 1970s "makeover" to landscape south of pool towards house was altered (Matthew Taylor/Taylor Brammer Landscape Architects) – a number of intrusive elements and inappropriate planting were removed. Agapathus plantings were retained, based on early photographic evidence of the type of plantings in that area. Climbing roses were replanted on front walls to Billyard Avenue (since removed). Ixora sp. Were planted near the front wall to supplement existing plantings. Existing cypresses in front garden retained. (Note: Bhutan cypresses in an avenue around the ornamental pool (Cupressus torulosa) were probably added at this time - these are now mature and over 10m tall, shading the pool and garden and lifting paving). Some bathroom modifications (vanities) appear to date from the 1980s or 1990s also.
- Post 1996 Garage/Butler's quarters/mechanics area changed by then-owners the Mounts to be a guest house. Materials and finishes generally match those inside the main house. This annexe till retains the engine hoist, and some garaging space on ground level. The petrol pump is gone. Works were done to match some existing details inside house, e.g.: the guest bathroom in similar dark blue iridescent /gold tiles. c. 1990s statue of a woman and pedestal bowl added to sunken ornamental pool in front garden, and front-side courtyard to guest wing paved with square blocks, and a new central fountain added.
- 2001 visit noting changes made probably in the late 1990s.
- Lord Howe Island palms (Howea fosteriana) planted on western side of rear (north) garden for privacy screen from 2 storey Edwardian house (also a former Albert property)

Courtyard to west of house - initial 1926 bananas planting is now replaced with pygmy date palms (Phoenix roebelinii), to match one existing older specimen on south-east side near house (which was there in 1926 photos) - this tree was nearly lost in a big hailstorm in 2000. The front (south) garden - 2 Chinese fan/windmill palms, Trachycarpus fortunei added to south end of the ornamental pool, for some privacy from flats over Billyard Avenue. Then-owner Mr Mount noted he could've put in (more of the) wider-growing Bhutan cypresses (Cupressus torulosa) to gain more privacy, but didn't - recognising that neighbours enjoy the front garden too/outlook.

- A Norfolk Island hibiscus (Lagunaria patersonae) also reputedly remaining from Macleay's estate is not now on Boomerang, but may (like the black bean and Moreton Bay fig mentioned above) be on other properties to the west on Billyard Avenue. A rich collection of ornamental palms are on site, ones in the SW corner near the gate include Cocos Island palm (Syragus romanzoffianum), and north-east of the carriage loop nearer the house (and elsewhere e.g. east of the carriage loop near house) are Lord Howe Island palms (Kentia fosteriana and K.belmoreana), Chinese windmill/fan palm (Trachycarpus fortunei). These palms look to date from the late 1920s Max Shelley original plantings on site.
- 2004 A pair of Alfonso XIII period glazed urns dating from the 1st 1/4 of the 20th century and provenanced to Boomerang (shown in situ on the north terrace outside the sunroom in a 1930 photo) were acquired by the NSW Historic Houses Trust for its Library & Research Collection. The urns were a significant element of the original collection of garden ornaments.

Between June and December 2005 a range of works were undertaken at the property, including:

Internal ground floor

- main entrance hall limestone walls and floor – cleaning;
- sitting room (former library): timber panelled walls & parquetry floors sanded & polished;
- dining room: cleaned, parquetry floors repaired and polished where necessary;
- hall (former dining room): cleaned, parquetry floors repaired and polished where necessary;
- sunroom: walls and windows cleaned, ceiling repainted;
- kitchen: new bench tops installed, metal cupboards cleaned, repaired and painted, window hardware repaired, walls repainted;
- main staircase: cleaned, repaired and replaced broken leadlight glazing to match existing.

Upper floor

- Bedroom 1: cleaned, parquetry floor repaired and polished. No works to bathrooms other than cleaning (for b'rooms 1–4);
- Bedroom 2: cleaned, floor polished;
- Bedroom 3: cleaned, floor polished;
- Staff bedroom: carpet removed, parquetry floor polished;
- Hall: stone walls & floor surface cleaned.

Lower ground floor

- private cinema/theatre & associated rooms: cleaning and general maintenance;
- billiard room: repainted and cleaned;
- laundry: pressed metal ceiling rusting, cleaned and repaired
- tiles: generally cleaned, repaired matching the existing and polished;
- parquetry: repaired, sanded and polished;
- services: replaced electrical services re-using existing conduits, including rewiring and provision of new switchboard. Existing switchboard disconnected and retained in situ. Repaired light fittings where necessary, made good air conditioning (existing); removed asbestos from grilles of gas heating (existing);
- new switches, power points installed with no damage to significant fabric, Existing switches retained in situ;
- painting – general repair, repainting of walls and previously painted joinery;
- plumbing – repair of hot water tank and heater;
- security – installed closed circuit security system;
- external walls repainted with Murobond mineral silicate paint (to match existing finish), general repairs (patching, re-fixing existing materials & detailing);
- roof tiles: repaired broken tiles and painted to match existing colours.

Front (street-side) garden

- exterior walls repainted with Murobond mineral silicate paint to match existing finish, infilled street wall "porthole" openings with opaque glass, fixed metal sheet panels to 2 front vehicular gates;
- removal of dead lemon tree, unsafe African olive tree, dead Illawarra flame tree, 2 frangipani trees in poor health;
- planted new trees – 2 Wollemi pines (Wollemia nobilis) N & S in street-side western garden, 2 Canary Island palm trees (Phoenix canariensis) as matching pair at southern end of sunken ornamental pool, near street wall;
- removed 8 Hibiscus rosa-sinensis, in poor condition (probably 1970s/80s cultivars).
- removed and replanted all perennial plant material (ground cover) on the street-side of the garden – Agapanthus, Clivia, Liriope;
- peeled Boston ivy (Parthenocissus tricuspidata) off walls, re-cut existing hedges;
- reduced canopy and dead wood of large mango and avocado tree overhanging Billyard Avenue, removed limbs of Port Jackson fig (Ficus rubiginosa) leaning on gate house;
- installed new plant material into garden – including ground cover of star jasmine, Korean box hedging;
- removed two original sandstone paths flanking ornamental pool;
- retiled sunken ornamental pool;
- installed pole-mounted security camera at perimeter wall on Billyard Avenue;
- installed new garden around 1980s pond in guest house courtyard east of entry gates, to disguise 1980s pond;
- installed new low-water tolerant "Sir Walter" buffalo grass lawn;
- reproduced missing and broken copper downpipe brackets to match existing;
- installed in line drip irrigation originating from existing irrigation valves throughout garden;
- positioned new garden lights removing 1980s additions and complimenting original garden wall-lights;
- all hard surfaces cleaned with high water pressure.

Rear (harbour-side) garden

- jetty repaired and restored to an earlier state;
- sandstone steps from terrace to lawn replaced with new sandstone to match original layout and arrangement;
- reduced canopy and removed old wire from Norfolk Island pine (Araucaria heterophylla) at rear of house;
- removed majority of strangler fig (Port Jackson fig seedling) from jacaranda (J.mimosifolia) at rear of house on west boundary;
- installed in line drip irrigation originating from existing irrigation valves throughout garden;
- lifted and replanted all perennial plant material (ground cover), replanted all Agapanthus, pruned frangipani's lower limbs on western side to open up garden, removed dead shrubs, limbs;
- installed new plant material, including Viburnum screening plants on boundaries and perennials (temporary plantings) in beds;
- positioned troughs planted with Box to disguise slumping in paving and on terrace;
- planted existing urns with Pittosporum, palms;
- all hard surfaces cleaned with high water pressure.

== Sales history ==
Year	Sale price	New owner	Notes
1928	$25,000 (land only)	Frank Albert	
1978	$1.25 million	Peter Burnett	
1981	$2.4 million	Peter Fox	
1982	$2.8 million	Mark Read	
1985	$5.1 million	Warren Anderson (Owston Nominees No 2 Pty Ltd)	
1993	$6.6 million	Nati and Miki Stoliar (Miriam Stoliar: owner)	
1996	$15 million	Duncan and Sally Mount	
2002	$20.7 million	John and Julie Schaeffer	
2005	$20.0 million	Lindsay Fox	

== Heritage listing ==
As at 5 July 2004, one of the most opulently Spanish houses in Australia.

Boomerang has historic, aesthetic and social significance as an example of large scale Spanish Mission/ Hollywood Spanish mansion and garden in an urban setting, in relatively intact condition, demonstrating the lifestyle possible of wealthy merchant of the 1920s, and the kind of social milieu possible and popular among that class at the time.

It has technical and research significance a rare example of domestic architecture of Neville Hampson in Sydney, and as a rare intact example of the landscape design of Max Shelley, a garden designer active in 1920s Sydney and South Australia from the 1930s onward, with an integration of house and garden rarely seen in Australia.

Boomerang has added historic significance as it incorporates landscape remnants of the former Macleay Elizabeth Bay estate garden, namely remnant trees from the grounds of the Hall of Macleay's Linnean Society of NSW (1885).

Boomerang, Elizabeth Bay was listed on the New South Wales State Heritage Register on 2 April 1999.

== See also ==
- Australian residential architectural styles
