= Henry Willey Reveley =

Australian civil engineer (1788–1875)

Henry Willey Reveley (1788–1875) was a civil engineer responsible for the earliest public works at the Swan River Colony, the foundation of the state of Western Australia.

== Life ==
Reveley was the son of Willey and Maria Reveley (later Gisborne), friends of the Shelleys and Godwins. He was born in England at Reading, Berkshire in 1788. His father was an architect, who assisted Jeremy Bentham in the design of his Panopticon prison. His mother, Maria, married John Gisborne (or Gisbourne) after the death of Reveley. In 1799 the family went to live in Pisa, Italy, where he graduated as a civil engineer at the University of Pisa.

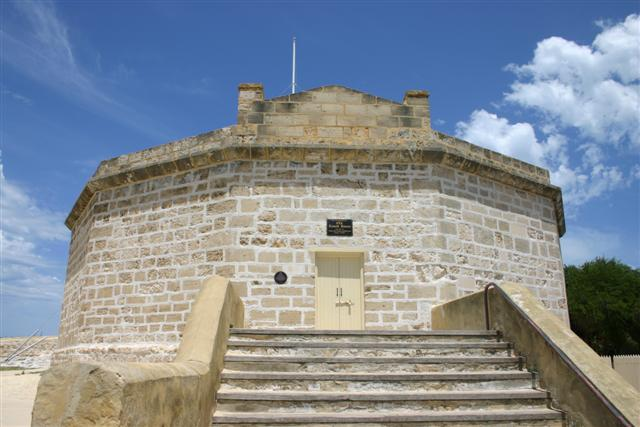
The Round House

On 20 January 1824, Henry Reveley married Cleobulina (b. 1790, also known as Amelia), the sister of Copley Fielding. He worked in London before being appointed the first Colonial Civil Engineer at the Cape Colony, where he arrived in January 1826. One of his principal tasks was to improve Table Bay Harbour. His best-known building is St Andrew's Presbyterian Church on Somerset Road, Cape Town. In May 1828 he was dismissed as incompetent by the Governor, Richard Bourke.

When James Stirling called at the Cape with the colonists aboard Parmelia, he employed Reveley to help establish the new colony in the west of Australia. He and his wife embarked on Stirling's vessel and arrived at what would become known as Fremantle in 1829. His first commission was the simple buildings at the temporary settlement of Garden Island. Once the colonists were landed at Fremantle, and Stirling had established his settlement at Perth, Reveley was to become the engineer responsible for all public works. These buildings included barracks for the military, the first Government House, and other official buildings of the Swan River Colony. His design for a twelve-sided gaol at Fremantle, known as the Round House, remains largely intact and is preserved as a heritage site that overlooks the west end of High Street.

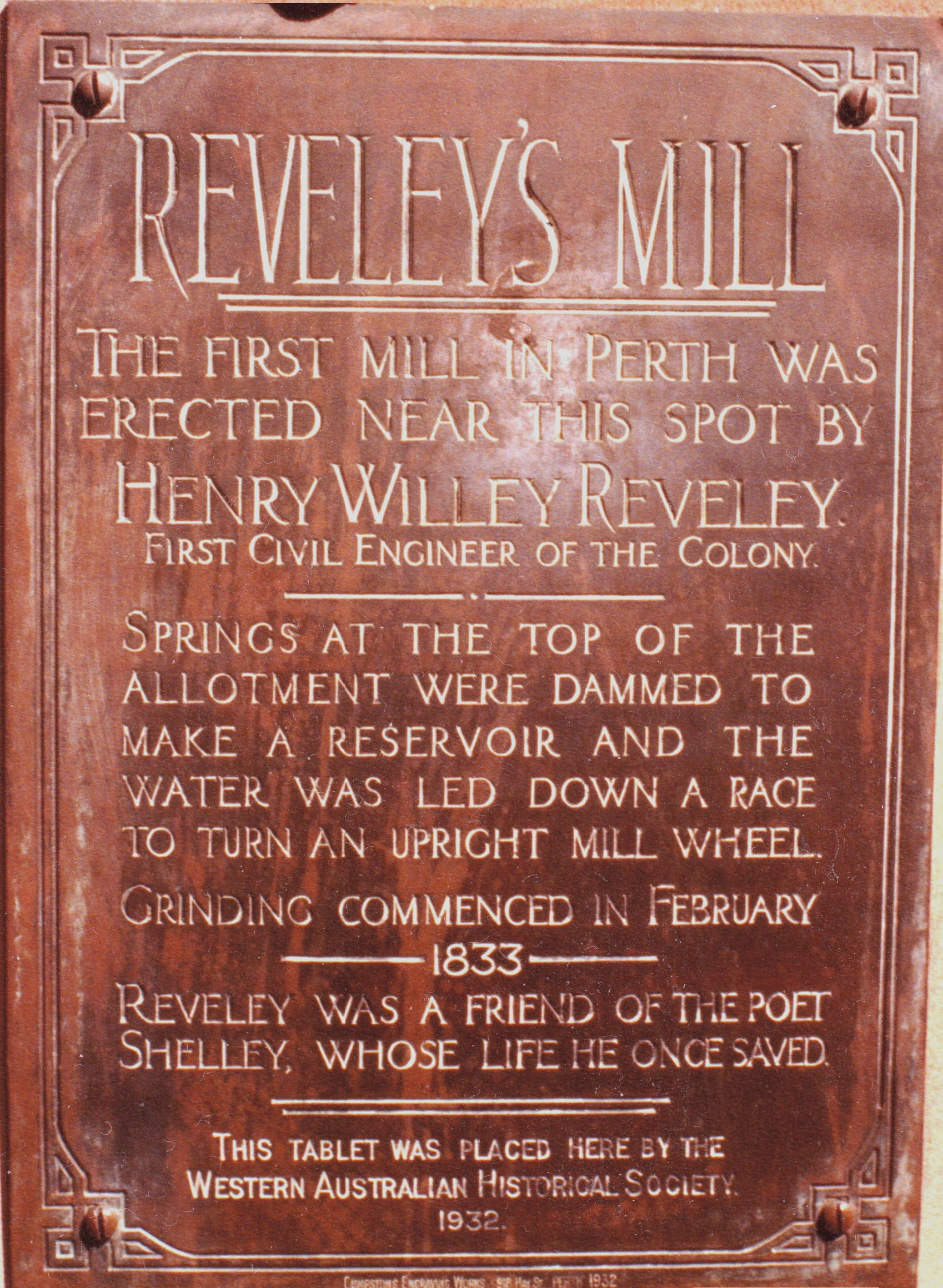
Plaque attached to Old Perth Technical School in 1932

Reveley's other works include Perth's Old Court House, opening a channel at the Swan River near the Causeway, and plans for a harbour and breakwater at Fremantle. He also executed a Tuscan design for a water-mill, a first for Stirling's colony, on his holding which became the grounds of the Old Perth Boys School and the Old Perth Technical School. His style has been described by Western Australian architect and historian Ray Oldham as "simplified Georgian".

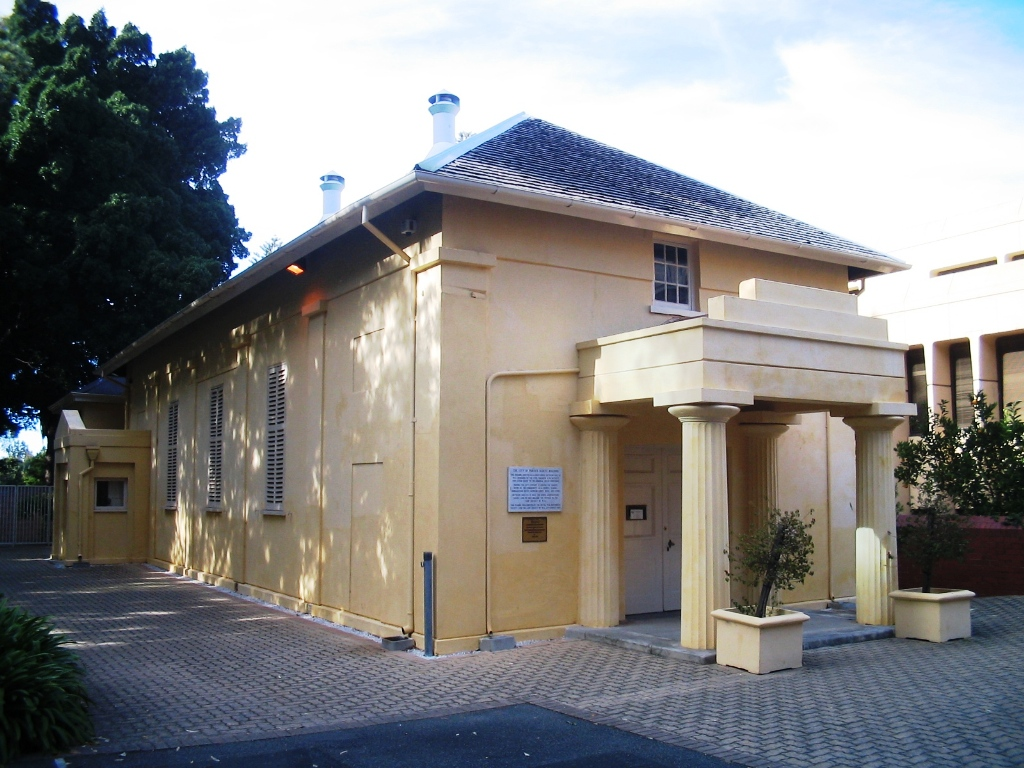
Old Court House, Supreme Court Gardens, Perth

In 1837 Reveley built a breakwater and a 57-metre-long (187 ft) tunnel for the local whaling company that linked their Bathers Beach Whaling Station to Fremantle's High Street. Five months' digging was completed in January 1838. Rapid progress was possible because the rock under Arthur's Head, although load-bearing and sound, was capable of being mined with a pick axe.

Disappointed with his prospects, Reveley left the colony in November 1838, returning with his wife to England, where he lectured on arts and science and published two articles on Western Australia, one on timbers, the other on immigration policy. In 1844, he also urged investigation of a kaolin-like resource found in the Swan Valley as stock for ceramic manufacture.

Reveley died at Reading, the town of his birth, in 1875.
