= Old Perth Boys School Building =

Heritage listed building in Perth, Western Australia

Old Perth Boys School
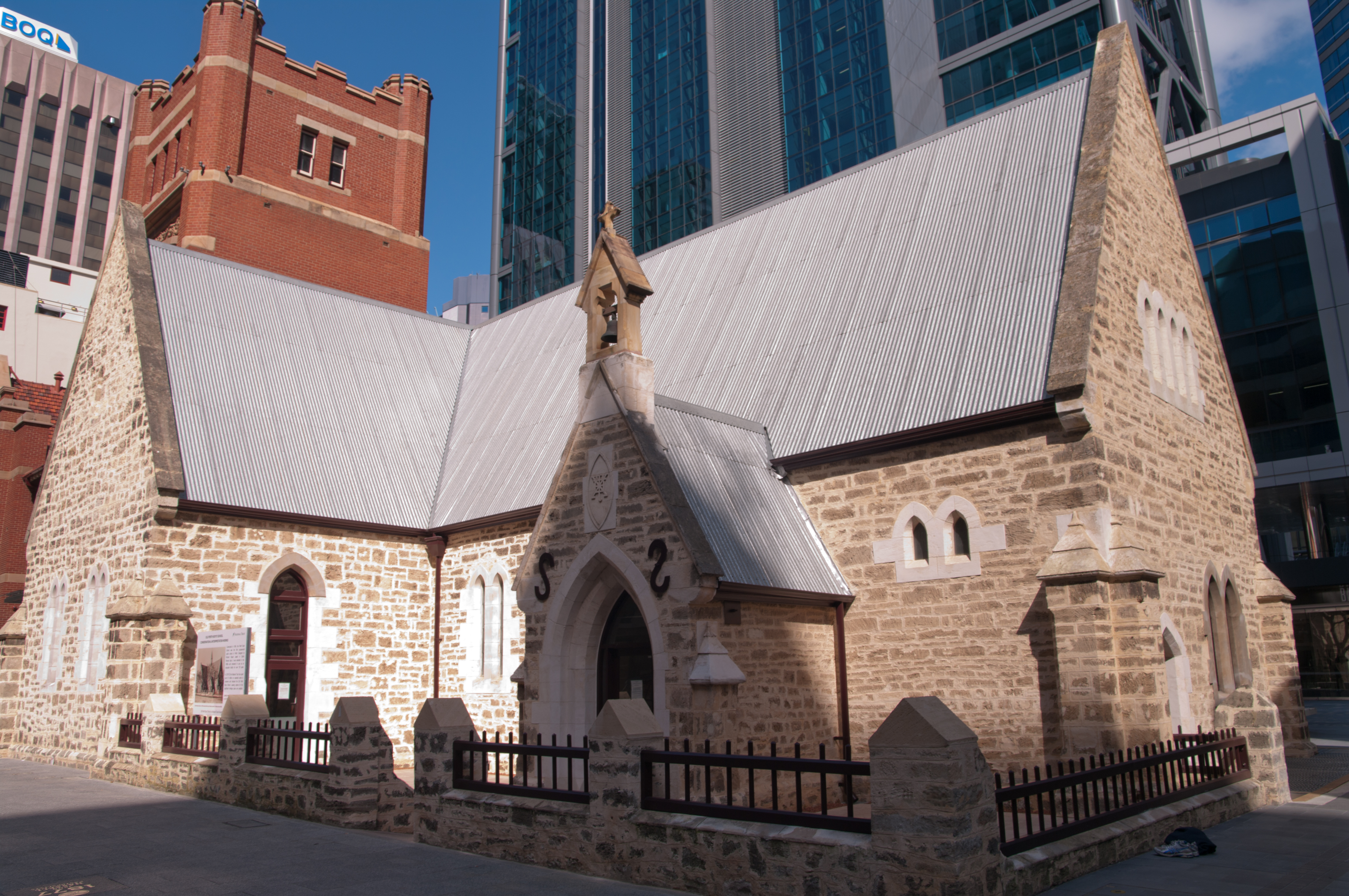
- Old Perth Boys School

General information
- Type: Government school
- Location: Perth, Western Australia
- Coordinates: 31°57′15″S 115°51′16″E
- Construction started: February 1853
- Completed: 27 September 1854; 172 years ago

Western Australia Heritage Register
- Type: State Registered Place
- Designated: 25 June 1993
- Reference no.: 2117

The Old Perth Boys School building, located at 139 St Georges Terrace, Perth, Western Australia, is the earliest government school building in Western Australia. The single-storey limestone building was designed by William Ayshford Sanford in 1852 and is a significant example of a colonial building constructed in Perth from the mid-nineteenth century.

== Built form ==
The Old Perth Boys School building was designed in an early gothic revival architecture style. It is a single-storey limestone building with a steeply pitched roof (originally shingled) and narrow vertical windows. The building, which closely resembles a church, had a wing added to the north in 1865 and another to the south in 1868. The shingle roof has been covered with corrugated iron sheeting, and the bell tower and spire have been removed.

== Early history ==
The Perth Boys School was established in 1847, despite not having a permanent school building. The school occupied an assortment of vacant places, including the Old Court House.

=== Construction ===
The location selected for the permanent school building was originally the site of a water-powered flour mill operated by Henry Willey Reveley, the civil engineer for the Swan River Colony.

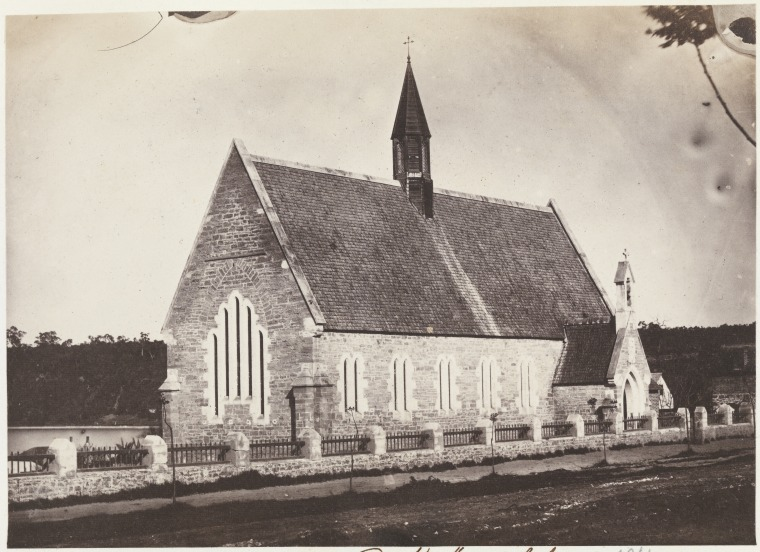
Perth Boys School, 1861.

Construction of the school began in February 1853 and was completed 27 September 1854.

The building was designed by William Ayshford Sanford, Colonial Secretary from 1852 to 1855, during which period he was also chairman of the board of education with an interest in schools. Sanford designed both the Perth Boys and Fremantle Boys schools. Sanford was a member of the Cambridge Camden Society and was an amateur architect with a passion for ecclesiastical architecture and, as a result, the school resembles a gothic-revival-style church.

The cost of constructing the building proved greater than expected. The additional expense was attributed to the boggy ground and the need for extra foundations. The building was a long, narrow structure with an east-west axis. It proved to be too small; the small windows made the interior too dark, and it reportedly lacked ventilation. A gallery (which is no longer extant) was then constructed at the western end.

=== 1854–1896 ===
In 1865, a small southern wing was added and, two years later, a northern wing was constructed.

For a number of years, the school had an average of 200 students but, in 1894, due to an increase in population attributable to the gold rush, the figure increased to 346.

Additional facilities were constructed in a temporary timber extension at the eastern end of the school to accommodate additional students. At the same time, plans were underway for a new Perth Boys' and Girls' School on James Street, which was completed at the end of 1896 and to which the students were relocated.

== Later history ==
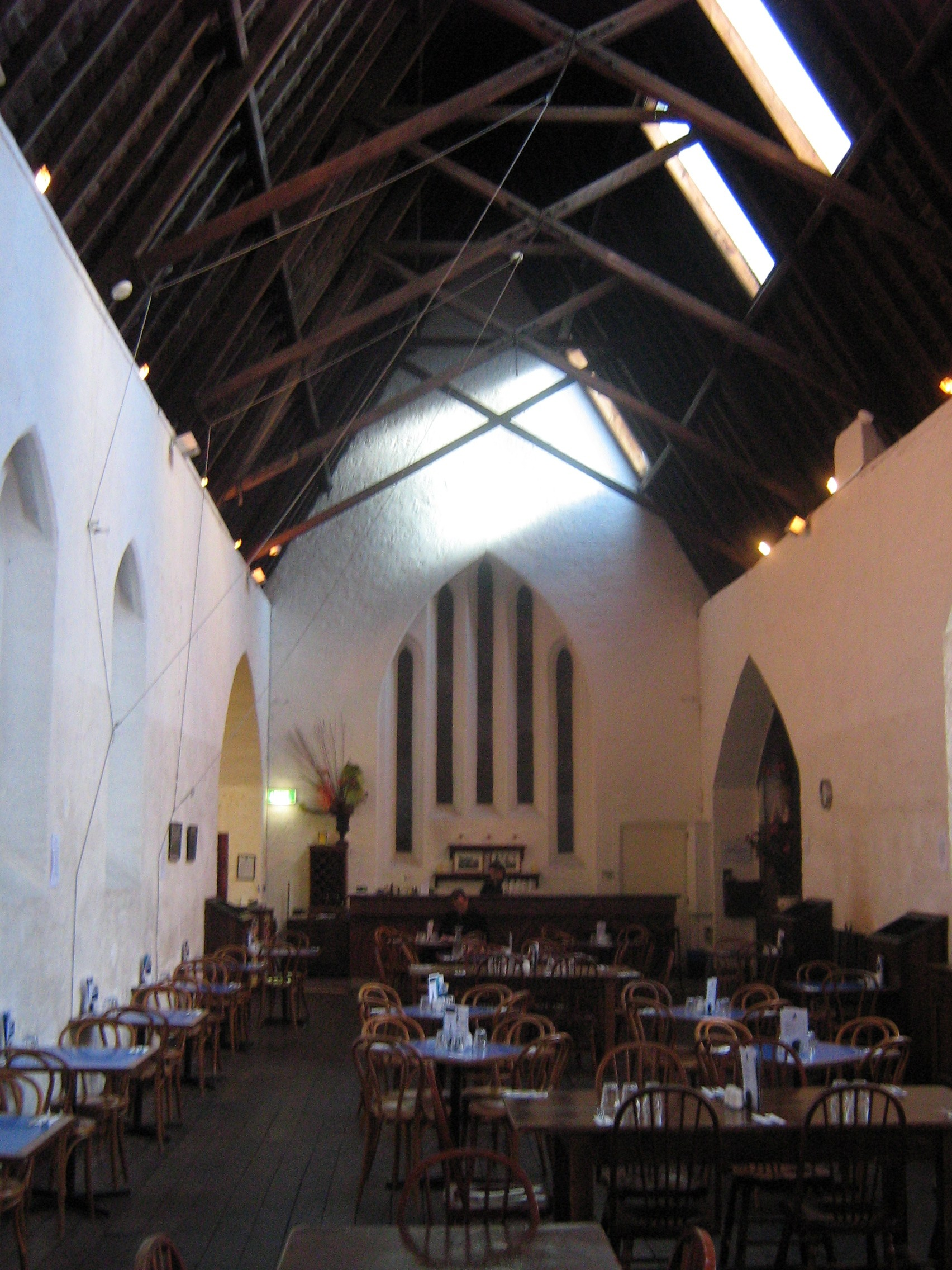
The interior of Old Perth Boys School

The building was incorporated into Perth Technical College in 1900. In 1976, the Public Works Department restored the front fence adjoining St Georges Terrace. In 1977, the place was used as offices for the headquarters for the National Trust of Australia (WA), with the Trust undertaking conservation work to the stone walls in 1978.

In the 1990s, the building operated for use as a retail shop for the National Trust of Australia (WA) and included a bookshop and restaurant. In 1995, the retail outlet was converted for use as a cafe by a private organisation. The Trust re-roofed the building in 2000–2001.

== Current use ==
The building is owned by the National Trust of Western Australia and was used as a café and wine bar. In 2015, Curtin University announced it had signed a lease with the National Trust of Western Australia to use the building for a range of shop-front activities. Curtin, working with the National Trust, completed an internal fit-out of the building in 2017 creating a University outstation for course activities in the central business district.

== Heritage value ==
The Old Perth Boys School building was entered into the Register of the National Estate by the Australian Heritage Commission in March 1978 and is classified by the National Trust (WA). It was permanently entered on to the State Register of Heritage Places on 13 March 1992.
