= Supreme Court Gardens =

Park in Perth, Western Australia

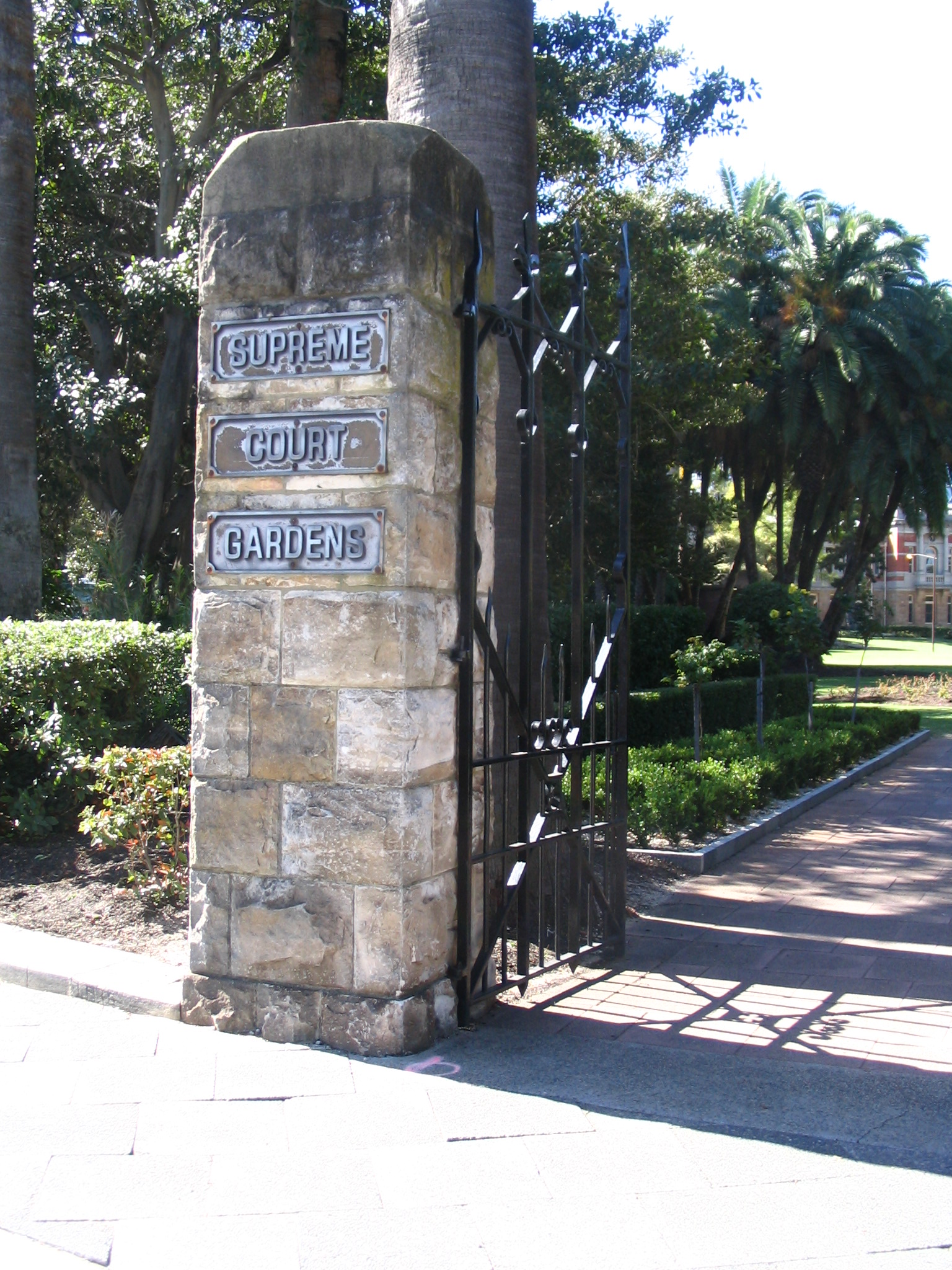
- Interactive map of Supreme Court Gardens
- Type: Urban park
- Location: Perth, Western Australia
- Coordinates: 31°57′31″S 115°51′36″E
- Created: 1845; 181 years ago
- Etymology: Supreme Court of Western Australia
- Operator: City of Perth
- Status: Open

Western Australia Heritage Register
- Official name: Supreme Court Buildings and Gardens, Old Court House, Stirling Gardens
- Type: State Registered Place
- Designated: 14 February 2003
- Reference no.: 1947

Supreme Court Gardens is a park in the central business district of Perth, Western Australia, bounded by Riverside Drive, Barrack Street, Governors Avenue, and the buildings of the Supreme Court of Western Australia.

== History ==
In the late 1880s Perth Water extended further north than its current boundary, and the river covered part of the area now occupied by the Supreme Court Gardens. What land there was south of the original court house and the Supreme Court building of the time was occupied by the police stables and Waterside Police Station. The police buildings were demolished in 1902 when a new Supreme Court building was constructed, and part of the river was reclaimed.

The gardens have had extensive trees, shrubbery and fencing, various small structures at different stages in the grounds in the past.

The gardens have at times been very poorly lit, and had many darkened areas due to the vegetation – this culminated in concerns in 1985 over safety due to inadequate lighting. By the 2000s large amounts of low shrubs and fences had been removed and better lighting introduced.

For many years The West Australian newspaper had an annual art show in the grounds, and the gardens have had a significant number of events and concerts, many associated with the Perth International Arts Festival. The orchestral shell (Note: Also known as the Jubilee Orchestral Shell and the Music Shell.) was constructed and opened in the grounds on 22 January 1956, but burnt down in the 1990s.

== See also ==
- Australia's Open Garden Scheme
- Gardening in Australia
- Heritage gardens in Australia
- Stirling Gardens, to the north of Supreme Court buildings

== Sources ==
- Gregory, Jenny (2003). City of Light: A History of Perth Since the 1950s. Perth: City of Perth. ISBN 978-0-9594632-6-2. LCCN 2005440691. OCLC 54781434. OL 3465933M. Wikidata Q133458669.
- Seddon, George; Ravine, David (1986). A City and its Setting: Images of Perth, Western Australia. Fremantle: Fremantle Press. ISBN 0-949206-08-3. LCCN 87131959. OCLC 16866226. OL 2438825M. Wikidata Q135222492.
- The West Australian outdoor art show, Supreme Court Gardens, Perth. General Printing. 1975.
