= Old Court House, Perth =

Heritage listed building in Perth, Western Australia

Old Court House
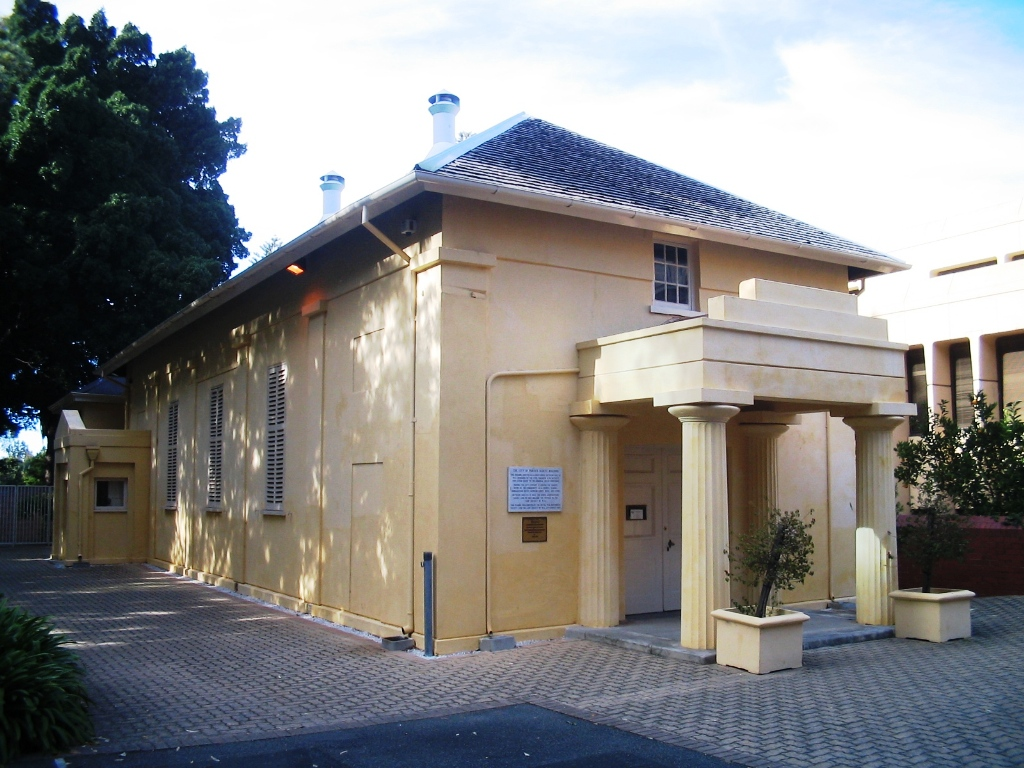
- Old Court House, Supreme Court Gardens
- Interactive map of the Old Court House area

General information
- Type: Court building
- Location: Perth, Western Australia
- Coordinates: 31°57′27″S 115°51′38″E

Western Australia Heritage Register
- Type: State Registered Place
- Designated: 14 February 2003
- Part of: Supreme Court Buildings and Gardens, Old Court House, Stirling Gardens (1947)
- Reference no.: 1948
- Website: www.lawsocietywa.asn.au/the-museum/

The Old Court House is the first court building constructed in Perth, Western Australia. It is located between Stirling Gardens and Supreme Court Gardens, off Barrack Street, adjacent to the Supreme Court building. It is a single-storey cream rendered building, with a wooden shingle roof.

Completed in 1836, it is the city's oldest surviving public building and is one of two remaining examples of the work of Henry Reveley, (Note: The other is the Round House.) the colonial civil engineer. It is one of the few remaining buildings designed in the classical Greek revival style of the 19th century in Perth.

== Description ==
The Old Court House building stands at the south-east corner of Stirling Gardens in Perth. It is a simple looking building of Georgian style architecture. It is of stone rubble construction with a stucco finish. It is a small, simple building with a hipped roof, which was originally clad with slate. The entry portico, which was added later, is supported by doric pillars. The area around the north and west of the building is paved in sandstone coloured interlocking concrete paving bricks.

== History ==
In 1836, Governor James Stirling gave orders for the construction of a court house in Perth. In February 1836, Henry Willey Reveley, the colonial civil engineer from 1829 to 1838, prepared plans and specifications for the new building. Reveley was responsible for the design and construction of several early public buildings in the colony, including the Round House in Fremantle, the Commissariat Store, the Government Offices, the first Soldiers' Barracks, and Government House in Perth.

The Court House in those days stood close to the original shoreline of the Swan River. It was completed in December 1836. The first Court of General Quarter Sessions was held in the building on 2 February 1837. The building was officially opened with a Church service conducted by the Reverend John Burdett Wittenoom on Good Friday, 24 March 1837. The Court House continued to double as a place of worship until St George's Church was built in 1842.

Aside from its general purpose use as a court house and temporary place of worship, the building was also used as a schoolroom. On 20 September 1847 the first Perth Boys' School was established in the building. Prior to the construction of the Mechanics Institute and the Town Hall the Court House was the only substantial building in Perth suitable for public meetings. The building played an important role as a focus for the cultural life of the Swan River Colony. The building, now referred to as the Old Court House, was called into service intermittently between 1856 and 1863 as an emergency immigration depot. In 1863 following repairs and alterations the building was once again utilised as a court house, this time for the Supreme Court. The Supreme Court occupied the building from 1863 until September 1879, when the Supreme Court relocated to new premises in the remodelled former Commissariat Store, a short distance from the old Court House in Stirling Gardens.

From 29 July 1905 until 1965 the building was used by the Arbitration Court. Minor changes were made to the building in 1921. On 14 October 1966, following renovations to the building which included a new shingled roof, the Law Society of Western Australia was granted use of the building for its official premises. In 1974, a Law Museum was established in the building. In 1985 the Law Society relocated its offices and the building underwent internal refurbishment to reconstruct its appearance as the Arbitration Court of 1905. In 1987, the Francis Burt Legal Education Centre was established in the building.

During the 1965 renovations the carved wooden coat of arms (then garishly painted and plastered, and nearly discarded) was discovered to be the original that was commissioned by Chief Justice Henry Wrenfordsley in 1880. It was carved of jarrah by Lewis Hasluck, grandfather of Paul Hasluck. It was restored and is now on display in the museum.

== Current use ==
The Old Court House currently houses the Old Court House Law Museum, operated by the Law Society of Western Australia, which focuses on the history of the law, legal issues and the legal profession in Western Australia.

== Heritage value ==
The Old Court House was entered into the Register of the National Estate by the Australian Heritage Commission in October 1980 and classified by the National Trust of Australia (WA) in February 1978. On 14 February 2003 it was placed on the permanent state heritage register.
