= Samma Group =

Australian development group

Samma Group is an Australian development conglomerate. It has been involved in developing various major urban and residential projects in Australia such as the Camberwell Junction tower. It has also been involved in developing a $400m pipeline in Melbourne.
