= Lee Steere =

Lee Steere (sometimes hyphenated as Lee-Steere), is the surname of several prominent Western Australians:

- James George Lee Steere (1830–1903)
- Ernest Augustus Lee Steere (1866–1957), nephew of James George
- Bridget Yelverton Lee Steere (1884-1979), wife of Ernest Augustus
- Ernest Henry Lee-Steere (1912–2011), son of Ernest Augustus and Bridget Yelverton

The Lee Steere family were originally from Jayes, in Surrey, England. The family took the name Lee Steere in 1675 when John Steere (1649-1689) married Fiducia Lee in Plastoe, Surrey. Members of the family continued to live in Jayes Park, Ockley.

Not all of John Steere and Fiducia Lee's descendants had a separate given name with "Lee Steere" as a surname. One of the female descendants married Richard Witts and had a son named Lee Steere Witts, who later "assumed the name of Steere". There are also records of family members named (for example) Lee Steere Steere and Sarah Steere Steere. Others were known simply as "Lee Steere" (including the 1848 High Sheriff of Surrey).

== See also ==
- Lee Steere Classic, Australian horse race
- Lee Steere Stakes, Australian horse race
