= John Curtin Foundation =

Fundraising organization

Formed in Perth, Western Australia in October 1984, the John Curtin Foundation was a fundraising organisation for the Australian Labor Party which attracted the sponsorship of a powerful group of wealthy businessmen, placing them in a privileged circle with direct access to both the Australian prime minister Bob Hawke and the state premier Brian Burke. The foundation was an early step to the creation of a unique network of corporate and government co-operation which was dubbed WA Inc by news media. Its two vice-patrons were Kim Beazley, senior, a former Whitlam government minister, and Mick Michael, an electrical contractor and former lord mayor of Perth. The executive-government patronage of business was similar to Peronism in Argentina. It caused multiple financial disasters, leading to a royal commission which exposed and condemned the corruption.

== Prime minister hosts magnates ==
In October 1984, 21 months after Brian Burke became the first of a line of Western Australian Labor premiers, Bob Hawke, himself having been in the prime minister's job for only 20 months, hosted a lunch for the new foundation.

It was the brainchild of Laurie Connell, Labor strategist Jack Walsh and Burke, and named after Hawke's wartime political hero John Curtin. [As well as Alan Bond and Laurie Connell,] Hawke also mingled with John Roberts, the hard-as-a-hammer builder who created the giant Multiplex corporation, the philanthropic James McCusker, founder of the Town & Country building society, Ernest Lee-Steere, the pastoralist, racehorse owner and Perth lord mayor, prominent businessman Kevin Parry and Ric Stowe, Australia's most reclusive billionaire, of Griffin Coal fame.

Others were timber entrepreneur Denis Cullity, prominent Catholic businessman John Horgan, and bookmaker Rod Evans, who was also a publican and substantial Perth property owner.

[In evidence to the WA Inc Royal Commission,] Connell alleged that Hawke dropped a proposed gold tax after Connell and various Perth high-flyers donated $250,000 each to Labor during an infamous lunch in Brian Burke's office in 1987 – a claim the former PM vigorously denied. Burke's loyalty to those who had donated their efforts (and money) to Labor was no less fervent. Taking the John Curtin Foundation axiom to the next level, Burke created the West[ern] Australian Development Corporation and installed fellow Catholic John Horgan (pictured second from left, top) on $800,000 a year, an extraordinary figure for a public servant not only then but now.

== State government's corporate strategy ==
To become directly involved in large-scale business transactions, premier Burke had created in 1983 a state-financed holding company, the Western Australian Development Corporation, headed by John Horgan on a salary of $800,000 p.a., and subsidiaries including Exim Corporation which sought to create and exploit export markets for education and other products. Legislation was pushed through which removed these operations from parliamentary scrutiny and ministerial accountability. The enabling Act provided that "(4.3) The Corporation is an agent of the Crown in right of the State and enjoys the status, immunities and privileges of the Crown..." while "(4.4) Notwithstanding subsection (3), the Corporation shall not be subject to direction by the Minister..."

== Large donations ==
Cumulative donations by individuals connected with the government's business involvements was a matter of concern to the royal commission, which published the following list to justify its concern: Mr Anderson $366,000; Mr Bond $2,038,000; Mr Connell $860,000; Mr Cullity $30,000; Mr Dempster $512,000; Mr Dempster (Tileska?) $300,000; Mr Goldberg $425,000 (including $125,000 to Puppet Theatre); Mr Hancock $950,000; Mr Hill $20,000; Mr Holmes a Court $30,000; Mr Martin $15,000; Mr Parry $205,000; Mr Roberts $692,000; Mr Yovich $125,000. "The size of the donations was quite extraordinary, particularly when compared with the size of donations made before Mr Burke became Premier".
