= Jean Jenkins (politician) =

Australian politician (born 1938)

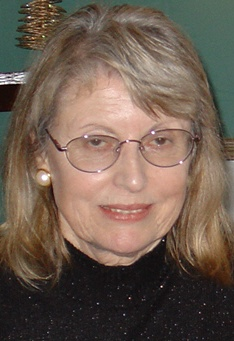

4th Deputy Leader of the Australian Democrats—Interim
- In office 24 March 1990 – 30 June 1990

Senator for Western Australia
- In office 11 July 1987 – 30 June 1990

Personal details
- Born: 16 March 1938 (age 88) Bristol, England
- Party: Australian Democrats
- Education: University of Reading
- Occupation: TAFE Dept Head

Jean Alice Jenkins (born 16 March 1938) is an Australian educator in languages and served as an Australian Democrats senator for Western Australia from 1987 to 1990. She is also noted as an originator in Western Australia of NAATI-accredited level 2 (paraprofessional) courses in translation and interpreting, and as a campaigner for human rights and preservation of built heritage. She has been a patron of the Art Deco Society of Western Australia since 1989.

== Early life and career ==
Jean Jenkins (née Elliott) was born in Bristol, England, and brought up in the village of Mumbles, Swansea, Wales, by adoptive parents Daniel and Blanche Jones. She was educated at Swansea Girls' Llwyn-y-Bryn High School and graduated in the University of Reading (B.A. with Honours in Italian, French and German). She taught languages in Italy and England, becoming an oral examiner for the University of Cambridge Local Examinations Syndicate. With her first husband, the late Donald Pope, an industrial physicist, she had two daughters and a son and the family emigrated to Australia in 1969. She was appointed as a languages lecturer at the Perth Technical College (a.k.a. TAFE) and was later promoted to the position of Head of Department, English, Languages and Social Studies. In 1979, she married writer and PR consultant Brian Jenkins with whom she resides in retirement at Safety Bay.

== The 'Castle Keepers' campaign ==
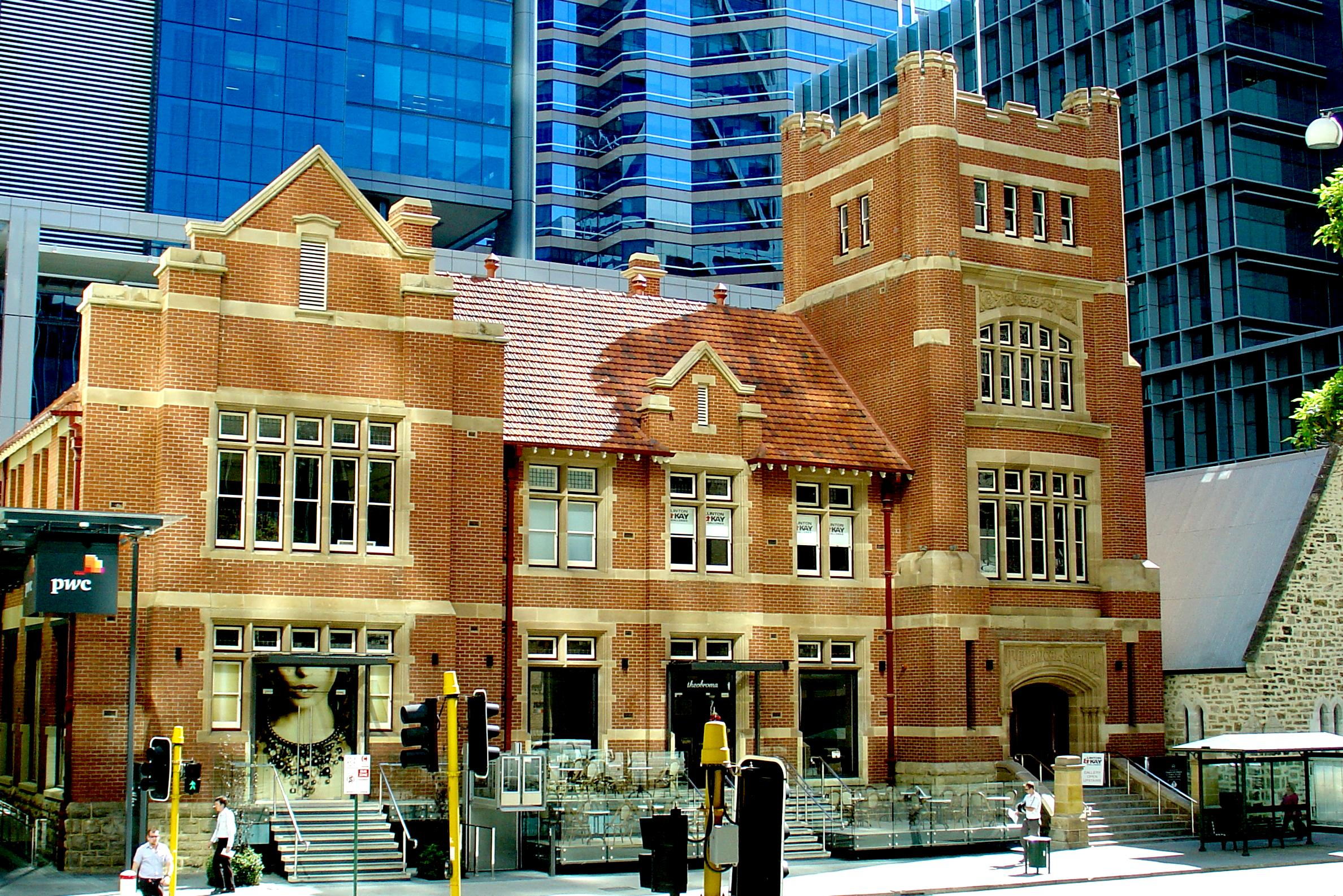
The 'Castle'–Technical School, after commercial alterations in 2012

In early 1985, Jean Jenkins was a senior lecturer at the 1910 Perth Technical College building in central Perth when the Burke state government announced through media that the building would be demolished as part of a major site redevelopment. It later transpired that Premier Burke had made one of the first of his notorious "WA Inc" business deals with entrepreneur Alan Bond and financier Laurie Connell through a quasi-governmental enterprise, the WA Development Corporation (WADC). Jean and an art lecturer colleague, Sue Paull, immediately convened a protest meeting. Public dismay resulted in the formation of a formidable campaign team styled 'the Castle Keepers'--a reference to the castellated tower of the collegiate gothic building. A public campaign was waged for six months, securing the firm support of the Perth City Council. Continuous media exposure hastened the capitulation of premier Brian Burke and his withdrawal of the demolition proposal at a meeting with the Castle Keepers' leader Jean Jenkins. The building was formally declared saved at a huge public celebration in November, 1985, and was subsequently placed on the Register of the National Estate. The 1910 'Castle' was the first significant Perth public building to be preserved through public protest since the fight for the Barracks Arch in the 1960s. In 1989, the Castle Keepers rallied for a second time under the then Senator Jenkins to defeat another destructive proposal for the building, raised by entrepreneurs Warren Anderson and Kerry Packer

== Political career ==
Following earlier involvement in student activism and the British anti-nuclear protest movement, Jean Jenkins joined the Australia Party in Perth during the 1970s and the Australian Democrats in 1980. She acted as the party's Western Australian division policy coordinator in education, and in immigration/ethnic affairs for several years, and was elected as divisional ombudsman.

=== Election to the Senate ===
In 1987, she was endorsed as the lead Senate candidate in the federal election (called as a double dissolution) and was successful, commencing a 3-year term in July, 1987.

She was probably the first-ever senator to address an astonished chamber in Italian, during her maiden speech, in reinforcing a point that unfamiliarity with English was a serious impediment to migrant schoolchildren. She tendered a quotation in the Welsh language during her valedictory speech in May 1990.

=== Range of portfolios ===
In 1988 the then leader of the opposition, John Howard, made remarks that Australia should cut back Asian immigration. He was resolutely attacked by Jean Jenkins in both the parliament and media, as she emphasised the Democrats' commitment to a non-discriminatory immigration programme. She followed up by introducing 46 amendments to Labor's Immigration Bill, all of which were defeated by the combined votes of the government and coalition opposition.

She regularly employed the Senate's Adjournment debate to criticise and publicise extensive human rights abuses including Aboriginal deaths in custody and the post-war child-migration scandals (simultaneously raised in the UK by Margaret Humphreys). During her three-year term in the Senate, Jean Jenkins delivered over 500 speeches and issued 430 media statements on issues ranging from wildlife and heritage conservation to the impact of high home-mortgage interest rates, on which she organised a national campaign in 1989. Her final parliamentary initiative was an unsuccessful private senator's bill seeking to establish a national register of foreign ownership of Australian business and real estate.

=== Election defeat and ousting from party ===
At the 1990 election, she polled 9.7% including the highest personal 'below the line' vote for any candidate, but was denied essential preferences by the major parties which her frankness had alienated, and she was defeated. For a year she continued to serve as an adviser to the Democrats' leader Janet Powell who was controversially deposed by a party-room coup on 19 August 1991. In 1993, the Western Australian division was subjected to an abortive politico-financial takeover bid funded by businessmen John Poynton, Harold Clough and others. Eleven elected party officers, Jenkins included, instituted a protective Supreme Court action, a technicality which led to their expulsion in 1994 by the party's national executive. As a result, a majority of Western Australian members left the party.

=== Support for The Greens ===
Jean Jenkins remained loyal to the Democrats for almost a decade—during which the party consistently rejected her applications for reinstatement—but finally joined The Greens (WA) (affiliated with the Australian Greens) and, in 2004, unsuccessfully contested the federal seat of Brand—which was retained by Kim Beazley who had feared defeat when the Greens declined to preference him. However, her action achieved its tactical objective of increasing the vote for the Greens' Senate candidate Rachel Siewert, who was elected for a six-year term.
