= Whitfield House =

House in Toodyay, Western Australia

Coordinates: 31.5532°S 116.4681°E

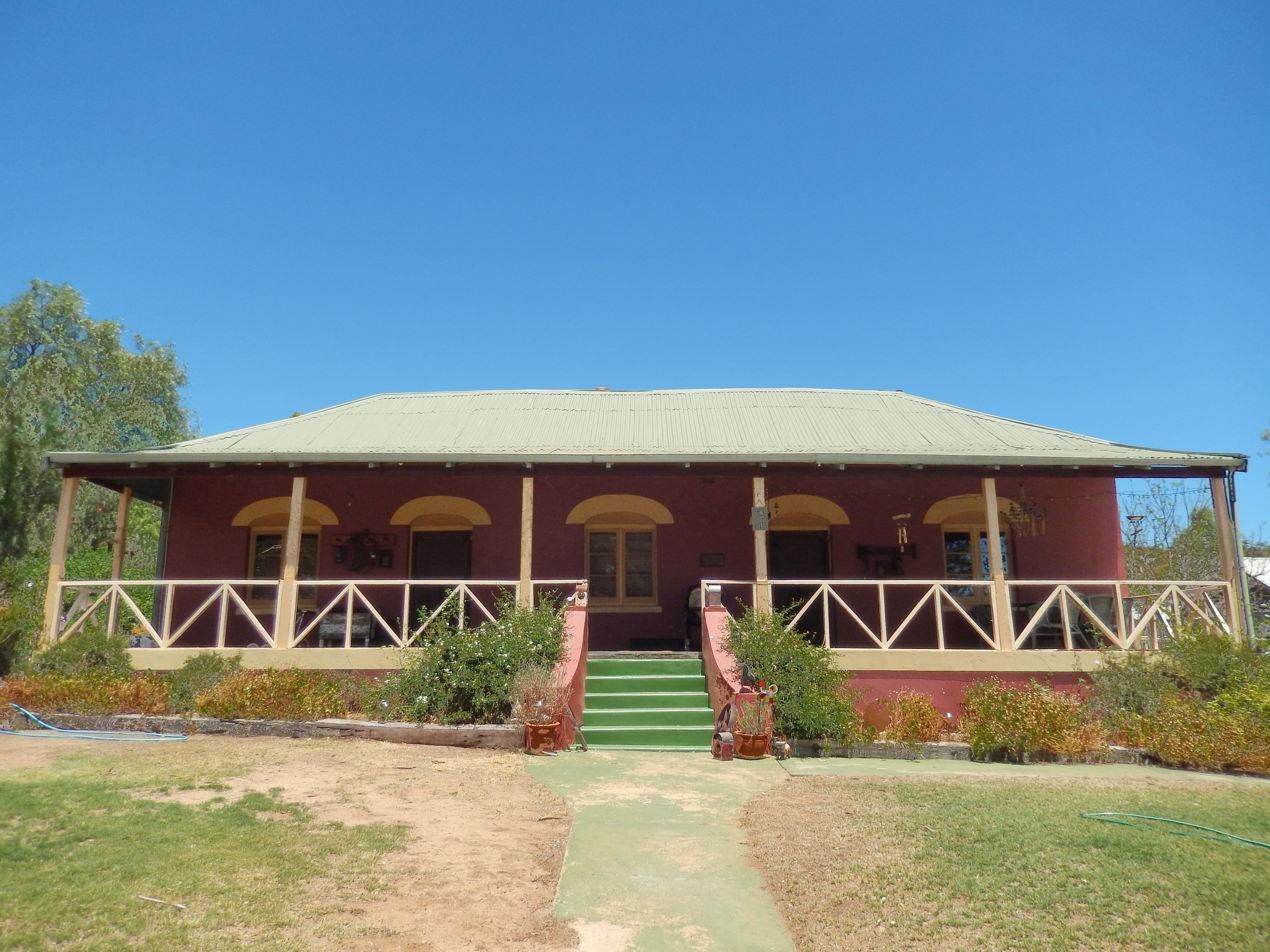
- Interactive map of the Whitfield House area
- Former names: Anglican Rectory, Lee Steere Home

General information
- Architectural style: Victorian Vernacular
- Location: 7 Fiennes Street, Toodyay
- Completed: 1863
- Renovated: 1887, 1949

References
- Toodyay municipal inventory

Whitfield House is located on Fiennes Street in Toodyay, Western Australia.

== History ==
The house was completed in 1863 for John Acton Wroth. It was originally a four roomed cottage with shingle roof. From 1871, Mrs. G. Whitfield used the site for a private school. In 1887, Augustus Frederick Lee Steere of the Lee Steere family purchased the house and added two rooms on the east end. He bequeathed the place to the Anglican Church on his death in 1903. The first clergyman to occupy the rectory was the Reverend John Ellis. It later became a private residence.

The house remains today as an extended dwelling of brick and iron construction with rendered arches to door and window openings, brick chimneys and casement windows. The front verandah has timber posts and colonial style cross-cross balustrading.

A commemorative plaque on the building notes that it was renovated in 1949, through the generosity of Sir Ernest and Lady Lee Steere.
