= Lady Lee Steere =

Lady Lee Steere may refer to:

- Catherine Anne Lee Steere, wife of Sir James George Lee Steere (1830-1903)
- Bridget Yelverton Lee Steere (1884-1979), Girl Guides leader and wife of Sir Ernest Augustus Lee Steere (1866-1957)
- Jessica Lee Steere (died 2001), wife of Sir Ernest Henry Lee-Steere (1912-2011)
