= Ernest Lee-Steere =

Ernest Lee Steere (or Lee-Steere) may refer to:

- Ernest Augustus Lee Steere (1866–1957), Australian businessman and pastoralist
- Ernest Henry Lee-Steere (1912–2011), Australian businessman
