= SECWA =

SECWA may refer to:

- State Electricity Commission of Western Australia, government agency from 1946 until 1975
- State Energy Commission of Western Australia, government agency from 1975 until 1995
