= Dallas Dempster =

Australian businessman (1941–2021)

- Born: 27 August 1941; Nedlands, Western Australia
- Died: 21 September 2021 (aged 80)
- Education: Hale School
- Political party: Liberal
- Spouse: Christine
- Children: 3

Dallas Reginald Dempster (27 August 1941 – 21 September 2021) was an Australian businessman notable for the original development of Perth's Burswood Resort and Casino (now Crown Perth) and the proposed Kwinana Petrochemical Plant, both of which were among the Western Australian government transactions examined by the 1990–92 WA Inc Royal Commission. In November 2013 The West Australian newspaper named Dempster as one of Western Australia's 100 most influential business leaders (1829–2013).

== Major business projects ==
=== Burswood casino ===
Dempster was a principal in the establishment and early development of Western Australia's only casino, Burswood Resort and Casino (now named Crown Perth), in partnership with Genting Berhad of Malaysia which had previous experience in casino development and associated tourism.

The original resort complex included a five-star hotel, casino, recreation facilities with 18-hole golf course, tennis courts, and swimming pools on a site fronting Perth's Swan River, 3 km from the city centre. The casino, the third largest in the world, opened for business in December 1985, with other facilities progressively launched over the following two years. The adjacent Burswood Park was planned to enhance the approach to Perth from the airport. Burswood Casino and Resort committed to providing the revenue to maintain and improve the park indefinitely.

Rival bidders accused Dempster of improper dealings with state premier Brian Burke prior to the awarding of the licence, but after a thorough investigation of these accusations, the WA Inc Royal Commission stated that there was no evidence of impropriety. However it noted that following the awarding of the licence, Mr Dempster, a Liberal Party member, had begun making large donations to the ruling Labor Party cause.

=== PICL venture ===
In September 1986 Petrochemical Industries Company Limited (PICL), a joint venture involving companies controlled by Dempster and Laurie Connell, proposed the development of a major petrochemical project at Kwinana, south of Fremantle, and on 2 November 1987 heads of agreement were signed by the government-owned State Energy Commission of Western Australia and PICL for the former to supply the latter with natural gas from the state's North West Shelf at a commercially realistic price linked to the CPI.

By December 1987, though, it was becoming apparent that Connell's merchant bank Rothwells was no longer a viable financial institution, and Dempster had been unable to secure 100% debt finance for the project.

Owing to outstanding loans to Connell and Connell-associated entities, Rothwells was short $300 million or more needed to restore its solvency and produce an acceptable balance sheet, and without these funds Rothwells would have to cease trading on its reporting date, 31 July 1988. To deal with Rothwells's impending crisis, a mid-1988 meeting involving representatives of the state government, Rothwells and Bond Corporation agreed that the government would give a discounted energy price and other guarantees to PICL so as to boost the company's value to $400 million, and Bond Corporation and the government would then purchase PICL for that price – $350 million to be paid to Connell so that he could repay $300 million of his debt to Rothwells and add $50 million of liquidity, and $50 million to Dempster for his share.

Some evidence to the WA Inc Royal Commission from government officers conflicted with Dempster's evidence, and he was found to have made a series of deliberate false statements regarding the project's viability.

=== Property development ===
In collaboration with WA ecologist and wetlands expert Tom Riggert, Dempster developed Floreat Waters Estate at Herdsman Lake, creating permanent lakes by dropping swamp levels below surrounding land, for which he received the Duke of Edinburgh Environment Award.

== Personal life ==
He was born in Nedlands, Western Australia in 1941 to Dallas Athol Dick and Eileen Olga Dempster. He was educated at Hale School. At age 15, he left school and began working at a bank, and subsequently started his life-long career as an entrepreneur working with various businessmen in Western Australia.

On 21 September 2021, Dallas Dempster died at the age of 80.
