= List of acts of the Parliament of Western Australia from 1934 =

This is a list of acts of the Parliament of Western Australia for the year 1934.

== 1934 ==
Short title, or popular name	Citation	Royal assent
Long title
Financial Emergency Act 1934	No. 1 of 1934	10 February 1934
An Act to make necessary provision for the continuance of the carrying out of a Plan agreed on by the Commonwealth and the States for meeting the grave Financial Emergency existing in Australia, re-establishing Financial Stability, and restoring Industrial and General Prosperity.
Roman Catholic Church Property Act Amendment Act 1934	No. 5 of 1934	12 October 1934
An Act to amend the Roman Catholic Church Property Act Amendment Act, 1912. (Note: Roman Catholic Church Property Act Amendment Act 1912 (No. 32))
Western Australian Aged Sailors and Soldiers' Relief Fund Amendment Act 1934	No. 10 of 1934	9 November 1934
An Act to amend the Western Australian Aged Sailors and Soldiers' Relief Fund Act, 1932. (Note: Western Australian Aged Sailors and Soldiers' Relief Fund Act 1932 (No. 39))
Dried Fruits Act Continuance Act 1934	No. 15 of 1934	5 December 1934
An Act to continue the operation of the Dried Fruits Act, 1926. (Note: Dried Fruits Act 1926 (No. 49))
Gold Mining Profits Tax Assessment Act 1934	No. 20 of 1934	12 December 1934
An Act to regulate the assessment and collection of a Tax on the profits of Companies carrying on the business of Gold Mining in Western Australia.
Loan Act 1934	No. 25 of 1934	28 December 1934
An Act to authorise the raising of a sum of Three million nine hundred and thirty-eight thousand pounds by Loan for the construction of certain Public Works and Other Services and the Re-appropriation of certain Loan moneys, and to ratify the Appropriation of certain moneys authorised to be raised by Act No. 40 of 1933. (Note: Loan Act 1933 (No. 40))
Appropriation Act 1934-35	No. 30 of 1934	28 December 1934
An Act to appropriate and apply out of the Consolidated Revenue Fund and from Moneys to Credit of the General Loan Fund and from the Public Account certain sums to make good the supplies granted for the service of the Year ending the thirtieth day of June, One thousand nine hundred and thirty-five, and to supplement grants made by the present Parliament during its First Session in adjustment of the Vote "Advance to Treasurer, 1933-34" for charges during the Year ended the 30th day of June, 1934.
Licensing Act Amendment Act 1934	No. 35 of 1934	4 January 1935
An Act to amend Section ninety-eight of the Licensing Act, 1911. (Note: Licensing Act 1911 (No. 32))
Constitution Acts Amendment Act 1934	No. 40 of 1934	4 January 1935
An Act to amend section fifteen of the Constitution Acts Amendment Act, 1899. (Note: Constitution Acts Amendment Act 1899 (63 Vict. No. 19))
Agricultural Bank Act 1934	No. 45 of 1934	5 January 1935
An Act to consolidate and amend the law relating to the Agricultural Bank of Western Australia; to reconstitute that body under the title Commissioners of the Agricultural Bank of Western Australia; to transfer to the new body the administration of certain Acts relating to advances to persons engaged in Rural Industry, and for other relative purposes.
	No. X of 1934	
King's Park and University Land Exchange Act 1934	No. 49 of 1934	21 January 1935
An Act to authorise an exchange of certain Land in reserve A1720 (King's Park) for certain Land comprised in Swan location 3087 and held by the University of Western Australia and for other purposes relating to the said reserve.

== Sources ==
- "legislation.wa.gov.au".
