= Teachers' Credit Society =

WA Teachers' Credit Society Limited
- Type: Credit union
- Industry: Banking
- Founded: 1971; 55 years ago in Perth, Western Australia, Australia
- Defunct: 1987
- Fate: Acquired by R&I Bank
- Headquarters: Perth, Western Australia
- Area served: Western Australia
- Key people: Alex Clark (General Manager); Brian Flemming (chairman)
- Parent: R&I Bank

The Teachers' Credit Society (TCS) was a credit union founded in 1971 best known for its part in the WA Inc scandal of 1987. Over the 16 years it operated, the TCS grew from a 300-member society into the largest credit union in Australia, with 40,000 members and A$550 million on deposit and millions out on loans. The TCS was considered one of the major driving forces behind the 1980s "debt-funded boom" in Western Australia (WA) and its collapse, along with the collapse of several other large corporations within WA such as Qintex, Bond Corporation and The Bell Group, triggered an economic recession in the state.

== Role in WA Inc ==
By the 1980s, TCS was already one of Australia's largest credit unions, however they grew rapidly during the economic liberalisation and deregulation of the Australian economy under the Hawke government. With the repeal of section 54-57 of the Credit Unions Act 1979 in 1984, the society was permitted to offer commercial loans. Previously credit unions were restricted to lending "modest amounts" to members for their "personal requirements". While the society offered very few loans in the first year of deregulation 1985, by the second year, 1986, a substantial amount of their loan portfolio was commercial, and they no longer met their reserve requirements.

During this period TCS were offering higher interest rates to their members than other societies to attract funds. This combined with the failure to meet reserve led to an inspection by the WA Registrar of Credit Unions. This inspection resulted in no action, however concerns were raised about the lack of diversity in their loan portfolio. Specifically the inspectors cited high levels of exposure to four individuals, and Rothwells. At the time of collapse, the four individuals owed the company a total of over A$118 million, more than 22% of the society's loan portfolio.

Roth Auditors in 1986 also raised concerns about the society's loan lending procedures, and the board members' minimal accounting experience. They also recommended the society appoint an internal auditor. Another concern marked in the later royal commission was the overbearing personality of general manager, Alex Clark; leading to an ignorance of risk and the company officers being unable to challenge Clark on his high risk leadership.

Following the release of the 1986 annual report in March, the society experienced a run on liquid cash, resulting in an application for an A$18 million loan from the R&I Bank. Despite receiving the loan the society was not able to recover after the 1987 stock market crash, and collapsed.

In August 1987 the society was absorbed by the R&I Bank, purportedly to protect its members. This drew much media attention and criticism, and set in motion what would later become the WA Inc inquiries and Royal commission. In 1988 charges were filed against several members of the board and the four major loan holders. In addition the government had placed nine companies into receivership and issued formal demands to over 170 account in an attempt to recover losses. In 1990 Alex Clark was found guilty of five counts of false accounting, and one count in attempted false pretenses. He was sentenced to 2.5 years in jail.

== See also ==
- WA Inc
