= Ric Stowe =

Australian businessman (born 1944)

Robert Fredrick ("Ric") Stowe (born 1944) is a businessman who was once prominent in Western Australia.

Stowe acquired Griffin Coal in 1979 and later acquired SkyWest and East-West Airlines during the 1980s. In 1984, Stowe joined the John Curtin Foundation along with Alan Bond, Ernest Henry Lee-Steere and Laurie Connell to raise funds for the then premier of Western Australia, Brian Burke.

The reclusive millionaire moved to Monaco in 1986, mooring his 60-metre (200 ft) yacht Capella at the tax haven. Since then he has split his time between his new home and Western Australia.

Stowe separated from his partner, Jemma Lee-Steere (Ernest Lee-Steere's daughter), in 1990. The subsequent court battle was subjected to media scrutiny. The couple had three daughters and a son and had been together for ten years. Though they never married, she changed her surname to Stowe by deed poll at his insistence. In 1994 she sued Stowe for A$250 million and, by 2000, a settlement was reached. In 2003, Stowe married Anne-Margaret MacDermott of Perth, his fourth wife.

In 2010 administrators were called in when Griffin Coal failed to pay a US$25-million instalment on US$475 million worth of bonds. Griffin had also failed to pay the Australian Taxation Office a A$5-million instalment of a A$65-million debt. The company collapsed shortly afterwards, leaving an estimated A$2 billion debt on coal and associated energy assets. Soon after, properties from another Stowe company, WR Carpenter Agriculture Pty Ltd, which controlled a herd of 50,000 cattle, were being sold off; these included Minilya and Joanna Plains Stations.

A fire sale of Stowe assets followed, with his estate, Devereaux Farm, near Bullsbrook selling in 2013. The 2,700-hectare (6,672-acre) property—with a 20-room, 8-bathroom mansion, two swimming pools, two helipads and a polo field—for which the asking price was A$70 million, sold for A$21.35 million in 2013.
