= Freemasons' Hall =

Freemasons' Hall may refer to:

- Freemasons' Hall, Bristol
- Freemasons' Hall, Copenhagen
- Freemasons' Hall, Edinburgh
- Freemasons' Hall, London
- Freemasons' Hall (Toodyay), Western Australia
