= Kwinana Petrochemical Plant =

Proposed but never developed plant in Perth, Western Australia

The Kwinana petrochemical plant was a never-realised petrochemical plant proposed in the late 1980s to be developed in Kwinana, Western Australia.

In September 1986 Petrochemical Industries Company Limited (PICL), a joint venture involving companies controlled by property developer Dallas Dempster and merchant banker Laurie Connell, proposed the development of a major petrochemical project at Kwinana, and on 2 November 1987 agreements were signed by the state government-owned State Energy Commission of Western Australia and PICL for the former to supply the latter with natural gas from the state's North West Shelf, at a commercially realistic price, linked to CPI. By December 1987, though, it was becoming apparent that Connell's merchant bank, Rothwells, was no longer a viable financial institution, and Dempster had been unable to secure 100% debt finance for the project.

Due to outstanding loans to Connell and Connell-associated entities, Rothwells was short $300 million or more needed to restore its solvency and produce an acceptable balance sheet, and without these funds Rothwells would have to cease trading on its reporting date, 31 July 1988. In order to deal with Rothwells's impending crisis, a mid-1988 meeting involving representatives of the state government, Rothwells and Alan Bond's Bond Corporation agreed that the government would give a discounted energy price and other guarantees to PICL so as to boost the company's value to $400 million, and Bond Corporation and the government would then purchase PICL for that price – $350 million to be paid to Connell so that he could repay $300 million of his debt to Rothwells and add $50 million of liquidity, and $50 million to Dempster for his share.

When PICL was sold to the state government and Bond Corporation its sole real asset was a heavily-mortgaged block of land in Kwinana valued at $100,000.
