= List of acts of the Parliament of Western Australia from 1952 =

This is a list of acts of the Parliament of Western Australia for the year 1952.

== 1952 ==
Short title, or popular name	Citation	Royal assent
Long title
Oil Refinery Industry (Anglo-Iranian Oil Company Limited) Act 1952 or the Oil Refinery (Kwinana) Agreement Act 1952	No. 1 of 1952; 1 Eliz. II. No. 1	27 March 1952
An Act to Approve, Ratify and Confirm an Agreement relating to the Establishment and Working of an Oil Refinery in the State; to enable the Carrying Out of the Agreement; and for other and incidental purposes.
Railway (Mundaring–Mundaring Weir) Discontinuance Act 1952	No. 20 of 1952; 1 Eliz. II. No. 20	14 November 1952
An Act to Authorise the Discontinuance of the Mundaring–Mundaring Weir Railway.
Coogee–Kwinana Railway Act 1952	No. 24 of 1952; 1 Eliz. II. No. 24	19 November 1952
An Act to Authorise the Construction of a Railway from Coogee to Kwinana.
Fremantle Municipal Tramways and Electric Lighting Act Amendment Act 1952	No. 36 of 1952; 1 Eliz. II. No. 36	17 December 1952
An Act to amend the Fremantle Municipal Tramways and Electric Lighting Act, 1903-1946. (Note: Fremantle Municipal Tramways and Electric Lighting Act 1903 (Private Act of 1903))
Fremantle Electricity Undertaking Agreement Act 1952	No. 40 of 1952; 1 Eliz. II. No. 40	18 December 1952
An Act to approve, ratify and confirm to the extent necessary an Agreement made between the State, The State Electricity Commission of Western Australia and The Fremantle Municipal Tramways and Electric Lighting Board relating to the sale and purchase of an electricity undertaking; and for other purposes.
Fremantle Gas and Coke Companys Act Amendment Act 1952	No. 42 of 1952; 1 Eliz. II. No. 42	18 December 1952
An Act to amend The Fremantle Gas and Coke Companys Act, 1886-1950. (Note: Fremantle Gas and Coke Company's Act 1886 (50 Vict. No. 34))
Coronation Holiday Act 1952	No. 44 of 1952; 1 Eliz. II. No. 44	18 December 1952
AN ACT to make provision for a special holiday to celebrate the Coronation of Our Sovereign Lady, Her Majesty Queen Elizabeth the Second.
Fremantle Electricity Undertaking (Purchase Moneys) Agreements Act 1952	No. 66 of 1952; 1 Eliz. II. No. 66	7 January 1953
An Act to approve, ratify and confirm agreements made between The Fremantle Municipal Tramways and Electric Lighting Board, City of Fremantle and Municipality of East Fremantle providing for the use, control and safeguarding of the purchase money and interest thereon of the electrical undertaking sold to the Electricity Commission of Western Australia by the Board.
	No. X of 1952	
Appropriation Act 1952-53	No. 68 of 1952; 1 Eliz. II. No. 68	7 January 1953
An Act to appropriate and apply out of the Consolidated Revenue Fund and from Moneys to Credit of the General Loan Fund and from the Public Account certain sums to make good the supplies granted for the service of the Year ending the thirtieth day of June, One thousand nine hundred and fifty-three, and to supplement grants made by the present Parliament during its Third Session in adjustment of the Vote "Advance to Treasurer, 1951-52" for charges during the Year ended the 30th day of June, 1952 ; and to approve of certain expenditure under section forty-one of the Forests Act, 1918-1931. (Note: Forests Act 1918 (No. 9 of 1919))

== Sources ==
- "legislation.wa.gov.au".
