= Fremantle Gas and Coke Company =

Former power company in Western Australia

Fremantle Gas and Coke Company Limited
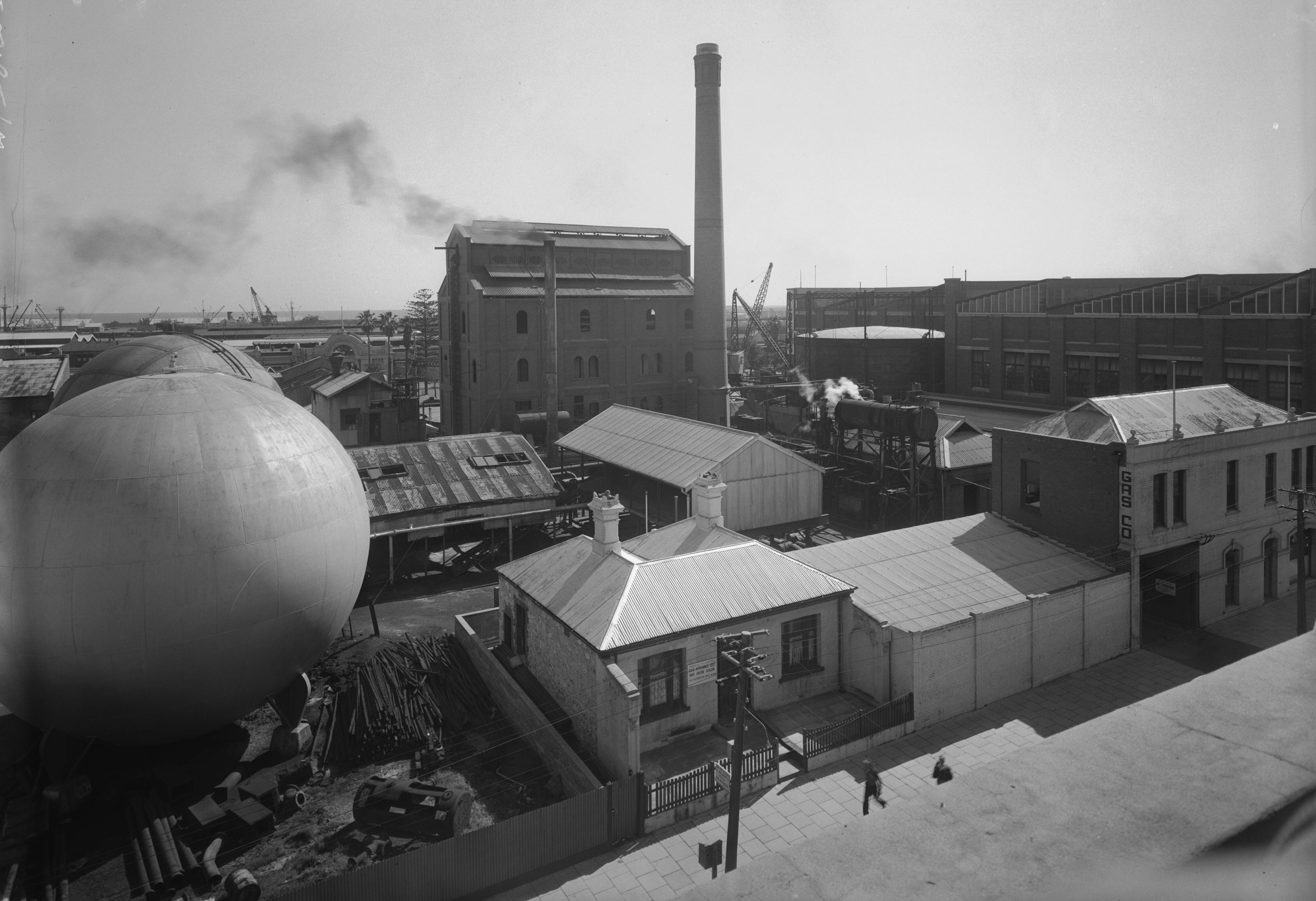
- The factory on Cantonment Street in 1953
- Type: Public
- Traded as: ASX: FGC
- Industry: Gas Production
- Founded: 29 July 1885
- Founder: RS Newbald
- Defunct: 1986
- Fate: Sold to State Energy Commission of Western Australia
- Headquarters: Fremantle, Western Australia
- Area served: Western Australia
- Products: Gas

The Fremantle Gas and Coke Company was a Western Australian company based in Fremantle.

== History ==
The Fremantle Gas and Coke Company commenced operation in 1885 to power and light Fremantle.

The company had a siding from the Fremantle railway marshalling yard in the early twentieth century.

In 1952 the company constructed a new gas producer. The gasworks' main feature was its gas holding domes, which were removed in the 1970s.

In the 1960s the Fremantle Gas and Coke company served 14,440 customers in a separate market zone from the State Electricity Commission, which provided the rest of the Perth metropolitan area. In 1986, it was purchased by the State Energy Commission of Western Australia which later attracted the interest of the WA Inc royal commission.
