= C.Y. O'Connor Beach =

Beach in Cockburn, Western Australia

Coordinates: 32°05′17″S 115°45′15″E

C.Y. O'Connor Beach

C.Y. O'Connor Beach is a beach in the suburb of North Coogee, south of Fremantle, Western Australia. It extends from McTaggart Cove in the south to Catherine Point in the north and is also known as the CY O'Connor Reserve. The C.Y. O'Connor sculpture is one of the features of the beach; the statue is situated in the ocean about 30 metres (98 ft) off the shoreline. The statute acknowledges that this is where C. Y. O'Connor rode his horse into the surf and committed suicide. Also on the beach is the hulk of SS Wyola, which was dismantled there for scrap; alongside it is the remnants of the timber barge that was used.

Previously the beach and adjoining land was part of Robb's Jetty Abattoir. The jetty pylons can still be seen in the surf; they stretch out approximately 120 metres (390 ft) from the shore, making a popular shore dive site. The jetty was built in 1870s and closed down in 1992, with the jetty and associated buildings removed in 1994.

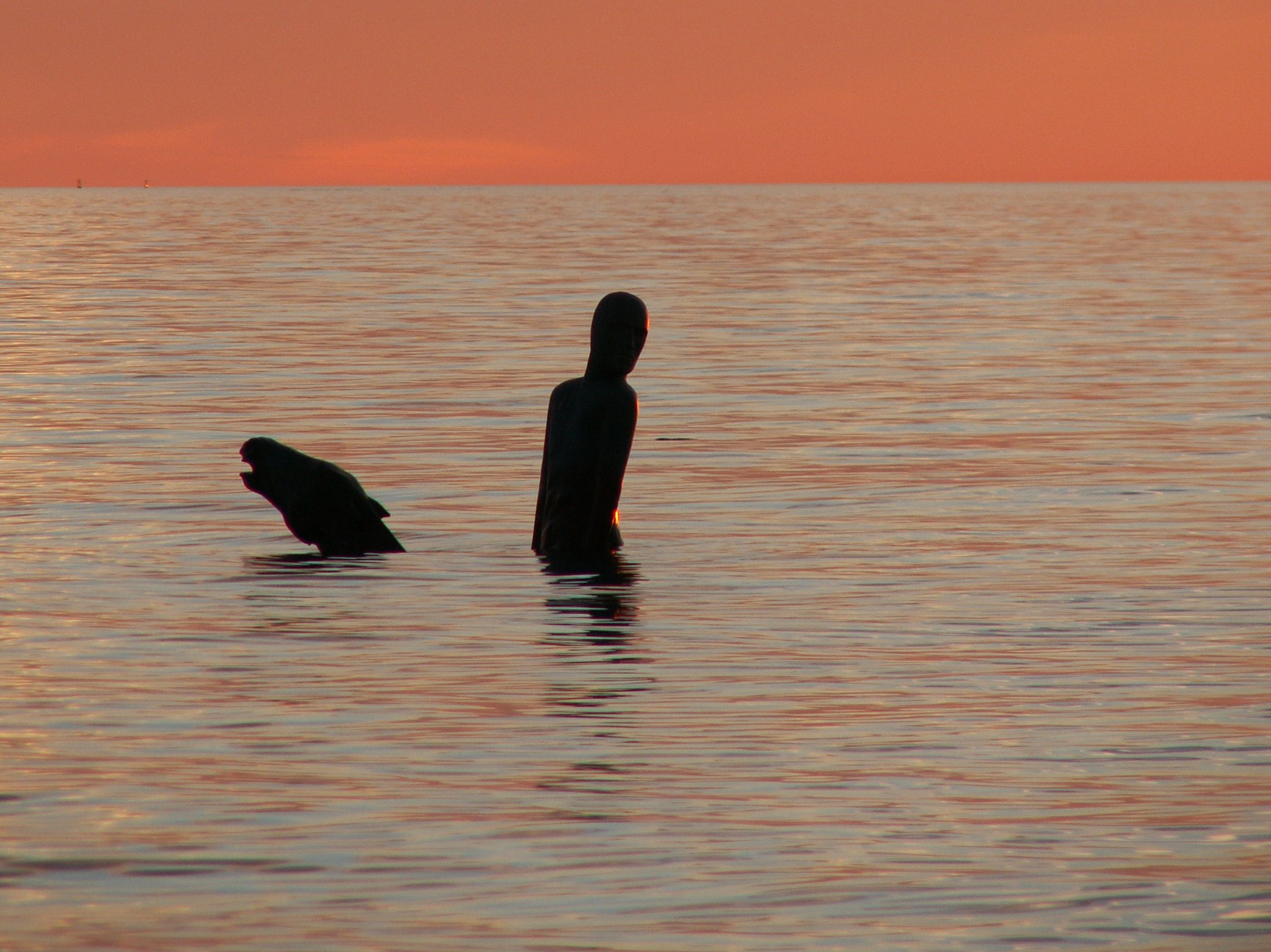
Statue of O'Connor and horse at C.Y. O'Connor beach
