= Kevin Parry (Australian businessman) =

Australian businessman

Kevin John Parry (1933 – 26 November 2010) was a businessman from Western Australia, most noted for his funding of the Taskforce '87 sailing syndicate which unsuccessfully defended the 1987 America's Cup in Fremantle, Western Australia. The defence cost over $20 million and built and raced three 12-metre class boats: Kookaburra I, Kookaburra II, and Kookaburra III.

In his younger years, Parry had been a noted Australian baseball player. He later established the Perth Heat baseball team as well as funding the first purpose-built baseball stadium in Perth, Parry Field at Belmont.

Parry headed the diversified Parry Corporation group (formerly Parry's Esplanade Limited and before that Parry's Department Stores), which included the Perth-based Parry's department stores which he developed from his father's backyard furniture workshop. In 1986, Parry Corporation was ranked 96 in a listing of the top 100 Australian non-financial firms. The Scitech centre in West Perth was supported by Parry until financial difficulties ended his involvement.

Parry was associated with other high-flying Perth entrepreneurs in funding the Australian Labor Party through a structure named the John Curtin Foundation, formed in October 1984 to harvest corporate funding for and facilitate political patronage of the federal Hawke government and the notorious WA Inc state government of Brian Burke. Parry Corporation suffered considerable financial difficulties after the 1987 stock market crash, and in late 1987 Parry lost control of the company. He later headed a small Perth-based homeopathic company Astop Biohealth with his son, Cameron.

Parry was appointed an Officer of the Order of Australia in 1988. This award was rescinded in 1996 after he was charged with stealing $75,000 from the Western Australian State Superannuation Board.

On 26 November 2010, Parry died in a car accident near his home in Bullsbrook.
