= C. Y. O'Connor College of TAFE =

Western Australian educational institute

C. Y. O'Connor College of TAFE (also known as C. Y. O'Connor Institute), established in July 1994, was a Technical and Further Education institute servicing the Wheatbelt region of Western Australia.

The institute was based in the town of Northam 97 kilometres (60 mi) east of the state capital, Perth.

It was named for engineer C. Y. O'Connor who designed the Goldfields Water Supply Scheme, which has served Northam and other towns in the central and eastern Wheatbelt since the 1900s.

The college won awards in 2006 for its training activities.

== Locations ==
Campuses

- Northam
- Narrogin
- Merredin
- Moora (completed 2000)

Satellite centres

- Jurien Bay
- Kellerberrin
- Kondinin
- Pingelly
- Quairading
