= Bevan Lawrence =

Bevan Ernest Lawrence, a retired Western Australian barrister and Liberal political campaigner, is the older brother of Carmen Lawrence, a former Labor premier of Western Australia. In the 1980s he was a convenor of two notable lobby groups that influenced the course of government at federal and state levels.

== Education and profession ==
Lawrence attended Aquinas College and studied law at the University of Western Australia, graduating in 1966. He commenced practising in 1968, specialising in insurance law.

== Political activism ==
In 1987, he was a spokesperson for People Against the Australia Card, a lobby group he founded with Professor Martyn Webb, which organised a public rally of over 40,000 people through the centre of Perth in September 1987 in a synchronised national protest that led to abandonment of the relevant legislation by the Hawke government. The issue had been a trigger for the 1987 double-dissolution election.

People for Fair and Open Government (PFOG) was established by Lawrence in 1989 shortly after the re-election of a Labor state government led by Peter Dowding earlier that year. Group members included Paddy O'Brien, who was a celebrated public figure of the group.

The group was formed after earlier Labor governments, led by Brian Burke, had made questionable deals with business groups, a situation commonly referred to as WA Inc. By early 1990 Carmen Lawrence had replaced Dowding as premier and the terms of reference for an inquiry into the dealings were delivered to her by PFOG in mid-1990; a Royal Commission of Inquiry was announced in November the same year.

The public stances by the brother and sister over issues created a trail of news stories about them.

In 1991 Lawrence published what he regarded as a conservative itemisation of the government's actual losses. The total he estimated as A$877 million.

Lawrence also wrote reviews of books about corruption and government at the time, in other Australian states such as Queensland.

Lawrence was regularly mentioned in federal politicians' comments about the Royal Commission, as well as political overviews of the era.

As a long term resident of Nedlands he has been instrumental in supporting sport in his area as well as being a councillor of the City of Nedlands. He also kept up public arguments with the status quo well into the late stages of his career.
