= WA Inc =

1980s Australian political scandal

WA Inc was the name for a set of public-private partnerships in Western Australia in the 1980s associated with the Western Australian Development Corporation, which became a political scandal. The state government, which was led for much of the period by premier Brian Burke, engaged in business dealings with several prominent businessmen, including Alan Bond, Laurie Connell, Dallas Dempster, John Roberts, and Warren Anderson. These dealings resulted in a loss of public money, estimated at a minimum of $600 million and the insolvency of several large corporations.

Bond and Connell were major contributors to the party in government, the Labor Party and its remarkable fundraising structure, the John Curtin Foundation. A royal commission (the Royal Commission into Commercial Activities of Government and Other Matters) was established in 1990 by Labor premier Carmen Lawrence to examine the dealings.

Connell alleged [in evidence to the Commission] that Hawke dropped a proposed gold tax after Connell and various Perth high-flyers donated $250,000 each to Labor during an infamous lunch in Brian Burke's office in 1987—a claim the former PM vigorously denied. Burke's loyalty to those who had donated their efforts (and money) to Labor was no less fervent. Taking the John Curtin Foundation axiom to the next level, Burke created the West Australian Development Corporation and installed fellow Catholic John Horgan (pictured second from left, top) on $800,000 a year, an extraordinary figure for a public servant not only then but now.—Journalist Tony Barrass, 2009.

In 1991, political scientist Paddy O'Brien identified the members of the government most associated with WA Inc deals as premier Burke and his successor Peter Dowding, deputy premier David Parker, industrial development minister Julian Grill and attorney-general Joe Berinson.

== Corporate failures ==
As an outcome of questionable business practices, precipitated by the 1987 stock market crash, several major businesses based in Perth found themselves in difficulties and ultimately went into bankruptcy. These included:

- Rothwells. Described as a merchant bank owned by Connell, but more accurately known in business circles as a 'lender of last resort', Rothwells had built up a stable of businesses it had acquired during the 1980s through aggressive takeovers. In October 1987, investors made a run on the bank and it had to close its doors. Burke, on behalf of the government, provided a $150 million government guarantee. Connell had previously been the adviser to the 1983 government purchase of Northern Mining from Bond Corporation for between $7 and $12 million over value but, as Burke knew at the time and concealed from parliament, Connell was also acting for Bond Corporation.
- Bell Group, Robert Holmes à Court's flagship company, encountered a cash crisis and Bond Corporation and the government, through the State Government Insurance Commission, acquired major stakes in the business in April 1988, allowing Holmes à Court to walk away with $350 million. Two years later, the SGIC had sold all the stocks at a loss of over $160 million.
- Bond Corporation
- Parry Corporation

A proposed petrochemical plant was to be built as a joint venture between Laurie Connell and Dallas Dempster, both being businessmen with close government connections. $100,000 was outlaid as a deposit on a block of land at Kwinana but otherwise the proposal did not proceed beyond designs and stood as a basis for fund-raising, loans, collateral transactions, development of proposed plant, management fees to Bond Corporation and, eventually, was sold for $400 million —$175 million being provided by a government agency, WA Government Holdings.

== Losses incurred by the government ==
The government had lent large sums of money, offered financial guarantees and acquired assets at inflated prices. Because of the connections between many of the deals and cross-ownership of businesses involved, it is difficult to say precisely where the government's fault started and ended. A minimum loss to the state of $600 million has been reported.

In 1991, barrister Bevan Lawrence published what he regarded as a conservative itemisation of the government's actual losses. The figures are summarised as follows:

Rothwells and Petrochemicals Plant	$408 million
Purchase of Bell Group shares from Robert Holmes à Court	$155 million
Unlisted bonds purchased from Holmes à Court, later assessed as having no value	$140 million
Westralia Square (Old Perth Technical School site redevelopment)	$74 million
Central Park property redevelopment	$100 million
Grand total	$877 million

== The WA Inc Royal Commission ==
On 19 November 1990, Carmen Lawrence, the then Labor premier, announced her government's intention to hold a royal commission to "inquire into certain matters". This decision followed more than a year of strong public advocacy by the activist group, People for Fair and Open Government headed by the premier's brother, barrister Bevan Lawrence, Professor Emeritus Martyn Webb and prominent political scientist Paddy O'Brien. O'Brien edited The Burke Ambush, subtitled Corporatism and Society in Western Australia, which was the first substantial exposé of Burke's pro-corporate government—a collection of articles by himself and other Western Australian writers, including Hal Colebatch, Robert Bennett, Joseph Poprzeczny, John Hyde, Paul Nichols, Michael McKinley, Anthony Dale and Tom Herzfeld.

The commission of three was headed by Geoffrey Kennedy and joined by Sir Ronald Wilson and Peter Brinsden, with a brief "To inquire into and report" whether there had been "corruption, illegal conduct, improper conduct, or bribery" on the part of any person or corporation in the "affairs, investment decisions and business dealings of the Government of Western Australia or its agencies".

=== Absence of important witnesses ===
In the introductory part of its report, the commission noted that it had

heard from 543 witnesses encompassing 847 appearances. [...] There were, however, some who may have been able to give valuable information to the Commission, who died before the Commission hearings commenced or after they had begun. There were others who were unwilling to assist and were beyond the reach of compulsory process.

The following had died or been incapable on health grounds: Peter Beckwith (Bond Corporation), Bill Burgess (Rothwells), Robert Holmes à Court, Thomas Hugall (Rothwells), Bruce Kirkwood (State Energy Commission of Western Australia), Andrew Mensaros (former Liberal state minister), Terence McDonnell (solicitor), and Jack Walsh (Rothwells). The following declined to give evidence: Yosse Goldberg (entrepreneur), Peter Mitchell (Bond Corporation), Tony Oates (Bond Corporation), and Ms Kim Rooney (wife of David Parker). Dr Shrian Oskar was serving a 6-year prison term in the UK. The witnesses whose testimony was received by the commission are listed in an appendix to the report.

=== Main findings ===
After approximately 21 months of enquiries and hearings, the commission's final report began:

1.1.1 The Commission has found conduct and practices on the part of certain persons involved in government in the period from 1983 to 1989 which were such as to place our governmental system at risk. Unfortunately, some of that conduct and some of those practices were peculiar to Western Australia; but there is no reason to believe that many of the fundamental questions raised by our inquiry were unique to this period or to this State. On the contrary, as detailed studies in other States and overseas clearly demonstrate, they have been raised elsewhere as a consequence of events similar to those which we have experienced.

1.1.2 Some ministers elevated personal or party advantage over their constitutional obligation to act in the public interest. The decision to lend Government support to the rescue of Rothwells in October 1987 was principally that of Mr Burke as Premier. Mr Burke's motives in supporting the rescue were not related solely to proper governmental concerns. They derived in part from his well-established relationship with Mr Connell, the chairman and major shareholder of Rothwells, and from his desire to preserve the standing of the Australian Labor Party in the eyes of those sections of the business community from which it had secured much financial support.

1.1.3 Subsequently, Mr Dowding, as Premier, presided over a disastrous series of decisions designed to support Rothwells when it was or should have been clear to him and to those ministers closely involved that Rothwells was no longer a viable financial institution. This culminated in the decision to involve the Government, through WAGH, in the Kwinana petrochemical project as a means of removing the Government's contingent liability for certain of the debts of Rothwells. Electoral advantage was preferred to the public interest.

1.1.4 Personal associations and the manner in which electoral contributions were obtained could only create the public perception that favour could be bought, that favour would be done.

In an earlier finding, the commission had summarised:

[The Government was not entitled] to risk the public resources of the State without its actions being subjected to critical scrutiny and review. Effective accountability was a casualty of its entrepreneurial zeal. Influence in the conduct of this State's public affairs was captured by a small group of self-interested businessmen.

The commission's report included a confidential appendix (not published) containing an "outline of matters to be referred to the Director of Public Prosecutions", and a list of recommendations impinging on open government, accountability, integrity in government, the Parliament, the administrative system, and a proposed Commission on Government

=== Summary of main issues ===
Report Volume I

- Government Employees Superannuation Board (formerly the Superannuation Board) involvement in the Halls Head development
- Financial assistance by Government to Bunbury Foods Limited
- Contracts relating to the Dampier to Perth Natural Gas Pipeline
- Natural gas sales agreements entered into by the State Energy Commission of Western Australia

Report Volume II

- Government Employees Superannuation Board (formerly the Superannuation Board) involvement in the Fremantle Anchorage development
- The acquisition of Northern Mining Corporation NL in 1983
- The Burswood Island Casino
- The sale of the Midland Abattoir site in 1986

Report Volume III

- The purchase of the Fremantle Gas and Coke Company by the State Energy Commission of Western Australia in 1986
- The Swan Building Society
- The Teachers' Credit Society

Report Volume IV

- The rescue of Rothwells Limited and continuing liquidity problems
- SGIC's acquisition of shares in BHP and the Bell Group
- The Kwinana petrochemical project (PICL)
- The 1988 sale of Westralia Square

Report Volume V

- The Kwinana petrochemical project to the settlement on 17 October 1988
- Central City property transactions entered into from 1984 onwards by the Western Australian Development Corporation, the Government Employees Superannuation Board (formerly the Superannuation Board) and the State Government Insurance Commission
- The old Perth Technical College site

Report Volume VI

- Allegations of bribery with respect to planning decisions in the City of Stirling for Observation City
- Role of Mr Ray O'Connor in alleged bribery
- Allegations arising from the trial of Robert Mark Smith and Robert Paul Martin, including those with respect to surveillance activities
- The adequacy of certain police investigations
- Political donations

=== Costs and outcomes ===
The royal commission cost $30 million, including $12.5 million in witness costs. Of the latter, $3.6 million funded Burke's own legal fees ($1.71 million) and those of David Parker ($1.92 million).

Burke and his predecessor, the Liberal premier Ray O'Connor ultimately served prison sentences as a result of convictions which arose from findings of the commission. The premier immediately after Burke, Peter Dowding, and public servant Len Brush were both found to have acted improperly.

The Western Australian Development Corporation's remit was reduced over time, and it was finally wound up in 1998.

== See also ==
- List of Australian political controversies
