= Fiennes Street, Toodyay =

Street in Toodyay, Western Australia

Fiennes Street Western Australia
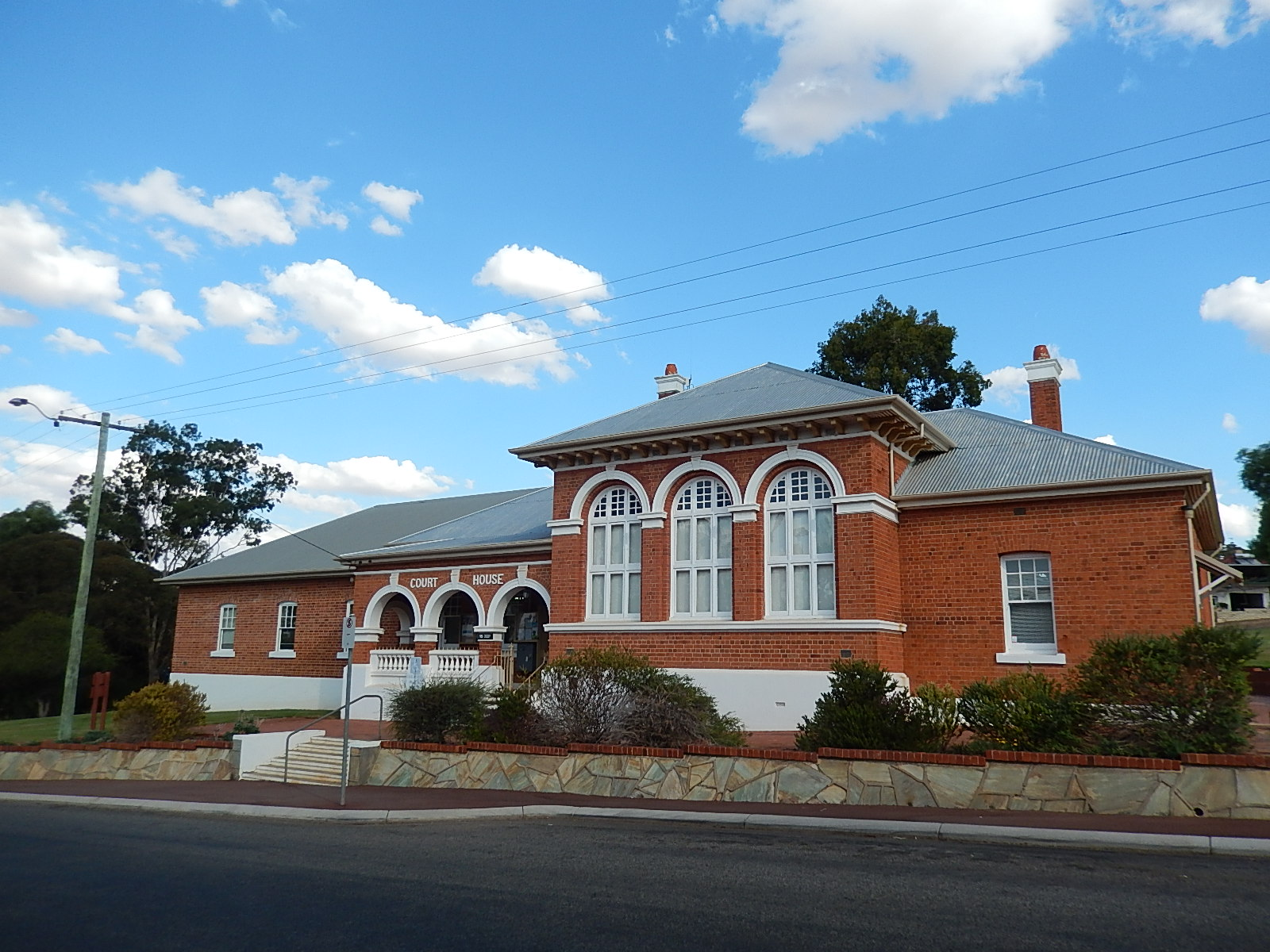
- Toodyay Court House from Fiennes Street

General information
- Type: Street
- Length: 350 m (1,100 ft)

Major junctions
- West end: Folewood Road; Pelham Street
- Clinton Street
- East end: Duke Street; Hamersley Street

Location(s)
- Suburb(s): Toodyay

Fiennes Street, in Toodyay, Western Australia, is a short street located to the south of the railway line that passes through Toodyay.

Fiennes Street is part of the Central Toodyay Heritage Area, and the location of a number of historic buildings included on the Shire of Toodyay’s Municipal Inventory. These include Lavender Cottage, Whitfield House, the former Green's Cottage, the Toodyay Shire Council offices, the court house, and Toodyay Lodge (also known as Freemasons Hall).
