= Freemasons' Hall (Toodyay) =

Building in Toodyay, Western Australia

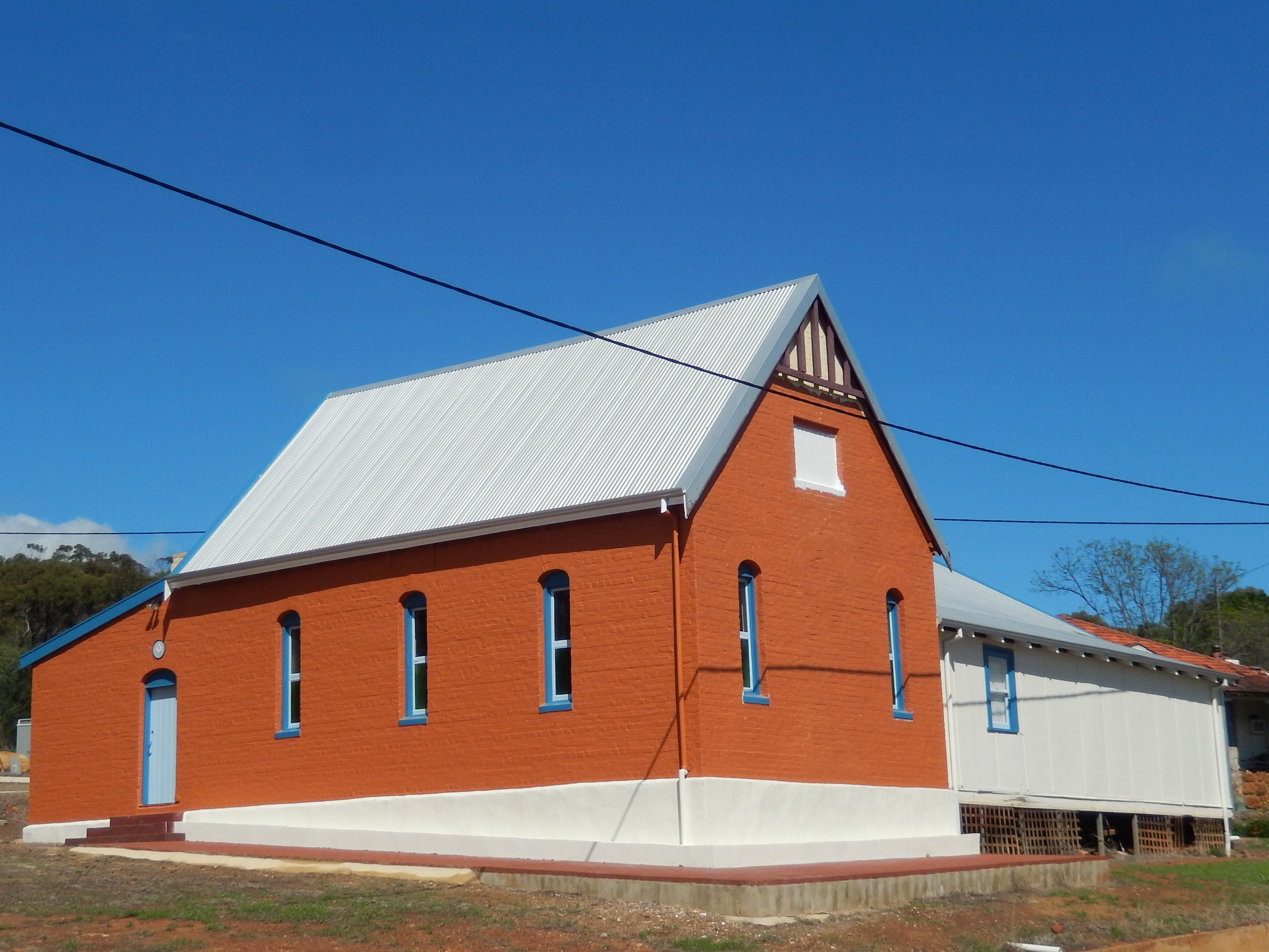
- Interactive map of the Freemasons' Hall area
- Former names: Temperance Hall, Templar Lodge
- Alternative names: Toodyay Lodge

General information
- Architectural style: Victorian Gothic
- Location: 19 Fiennes Street, Toodyay, Australia
- Coordinates: 31.552886°S 116.465179°E
- Completed: 1879
- Renovated: 1924

Design and construction
- Architect: Percy W. Harrison (1924)

References
- Toodyay municipal inventory

The Freemasons' Hall, often spelt Freemason's Hall, also known as the Toodyay Lodge, Templar Lodge, and Temperance Hall, on Fiennes Street, Toodyay, Western Australia, is a masonic hall built in 1879.

== History ==
The hall built on land donated by Charles Marris for the purpose of building a temple for the Temperance movement. The Templars used the place and it was also the venue for Methodist Church services until 1898. In 1899, the Rev E. Holiday purchased the building for the Freemasons.

On 20 November 1899, the building was consecrated and dedicated in Newcastle as No. 2803 (English Constitution). When the Grand Lodge of Western Australia was established some months later, its number changed to No. 37.

In 1924, an additional wing was constructed designed by architect Percy Harrison, also a Freemason. When the road was widened, the front steps were demolished and the front door bricked up.

The building was repainted to resemble the original colour of the bricks in 2014.

== Architecture ==
The building is described thus in its heritage listing by Toodyay Shire Council: "Tall Gothic style Mason hall with steep pitched iron roof and tall narrow windows set in recessed rounded arch openings. The extension to the rear with skillion roof is of a lean-to style. Painted brick and half timbering to gable apex are present. The front door is bricked in but the original dressings around the opening is still visible. The side extension of timber and iron on stumps adjoins a brick structure with shallower pitched gable roof and timber vented gable apex. There are high level small windows at rear."

== Heritage listings ==
The building was classified by the National Trust of Western Australia in 1977, listed on the municipal inventory in 2989, and heritage-listed in 2012, for both its historic and aesthetic value.

== See also ==
- Freemasons Hotel (Toodyay)
