= Lee Steere Classic =

Horse race in Perth, Western Australia

Sir Ernest Lee-Steere Classic
- Class: Listed Race
- Location: Ascot Racecourse
- Inaugurated: 1983
- Race type: Thoroughbred
- Sponsor: TABTouch (2016-25)

Race information
- Distance: 1,400 metres
- Surface: Turf
- Track: Left-handed
- Qualification: Three year old
- Weight: Set weights Colts and geldings – 56½ kg fillies – 54½ kg
- Purse: A$125,000 (2026)

The Sir Ernest Lee-Steere Classic is a Perth Racing Listed Thoroughbred horse race for three-year-olds at set weights held over 1400 metres at Ascot Racecourse in Perth, Western Australia each year in November.

== History ==
The race is named after Ernest Henry Lee-Steere, chairman of the Western Australian Turf Club 1963–1984.

There is also a Lee Steere Stakes raced at Ascot in November for horses aged three years old and older, over the distance of 1400 metres.

In 2005 and prior to 2000 the race was scheduled during the Perth Cup Carnival.

In 2003 the race was run at Belmont Park Racecourse.

The race was downgraded to a Listed race in 2016.

=== Grade ===
- 1983–1985 - Listed race
- 1986–2015 - Group 3
- 2016 - Listed race

== Winners ==
The following are past winners of the race.

- 2025 - Hot And High
- 2024 - Cashel Palace
- 2023 - Investmentstrategy
- 2022 - Saintorio
- 2021 - Liwa
- 2020 - Kissonallforcheeks
- 2019 - Sanabreanna
- 2018 - The Velvet King
- 2017 - War Room
- 2016 - Lusaha
- 2015 - Lite'n In My Veins
- 2014 - Liberty's Gem
- 2013 - Petrol Power
- 2012 - Hard Ball Get
- 2011 - Night War
- 2010 - Playcidium Mint
- 2009 - Dino Mak
- 2008 - Destino
- 2007 - Yuro
- 2006 - Mansion House
- 2005 (Dec.) - Stormy Nova
- 2005 (Jan.) - Secret Monarch
- 2003 - Changing Lanes
- 2002 - Early Express
- 2001 - Dexian
- 2000 - Master Park
- 1999 - Zedamoss
- 1999 - Fly My Kite
- 1998 - Wolf Pack
- 1997 - The Medic
- 1995 - Ned's Brother
- 1994 (Dec.) - Discussion
- 1994 (Jan.) - Mobile Link
- 1993 - Classy Dresser
- 1992 - Mount Angelo
- 1991 - Paklani
- 1990 - Stray Bullet
- 1989 - Lady Of Battle
- 1988 - Edge Of Darkness
- 1987 - Placid Ark
- 1986 - Fimiston
- 1985 - Renminbi
- 1984 - Top Post
- 1983 - Corona Miss

== See also ==
- Lee Steere Stakes
- Winterbottom Stakes
- List of Australian Group races
- Group races
