= Bankwest =

Australian bank

- Formerly: Rural and Industries Bank; Agricultural Bank of Western Australia
- Type: Subsidiary
- Industry: Financial services
- Founded: 1895
- Headquarters: Bankwest Place, Perth, Western Australia
- Area served: Australia
- Key people: Jason Chan, Executive General Manager
- Products: Home loans Transaction accounts Savings accounts Term deposits Credit cards
- Parent: Commonwealth Bank
- Website: www.bankwest.com.au

Bankwest is an Australian digital bank based in Perth, Western Australia. It was founded as the Agricultural Bank of Western Australia in 1895 by the Government of Western Australia being renamed the Rural and Industries Bank in 1944, and Bankwest in 1994 before being privatised. After a period of being a listed company on the Australian Securities Exchange, it was taken over by the Bank of Scotland, and since 2008 has been a subsidiary of the Commonwealth Bank.

Having expanded into the eastern states in the 1980s, it closed the last of these branches in October 2022. The remaining 60 branches in Western Australia were all closed by the end of 2024 with 15 of them being converted to Commonwealth Bank branches. Bankwest then became an online bank only.

== History ==
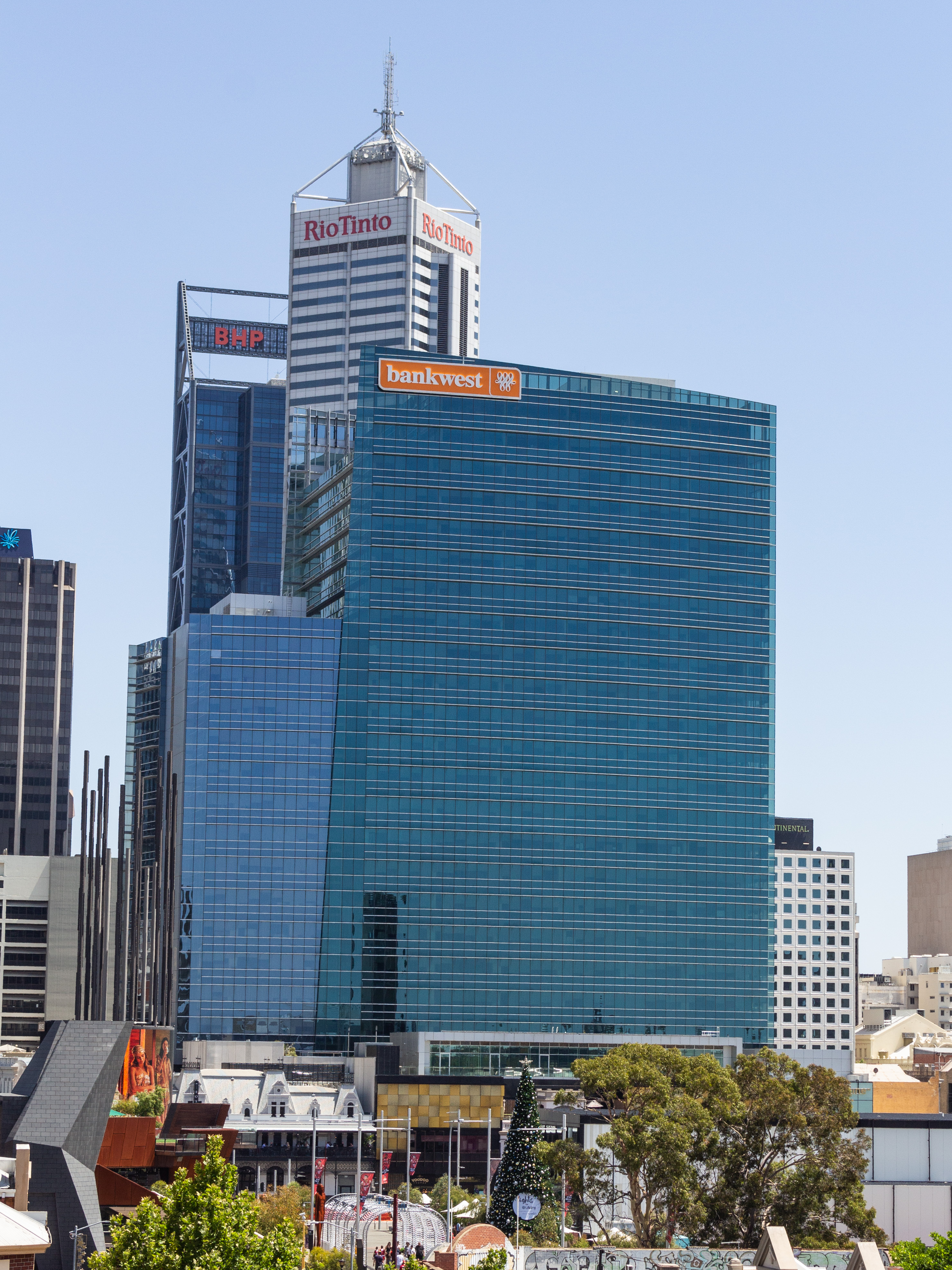
Bankwest Place headquarters in 2019

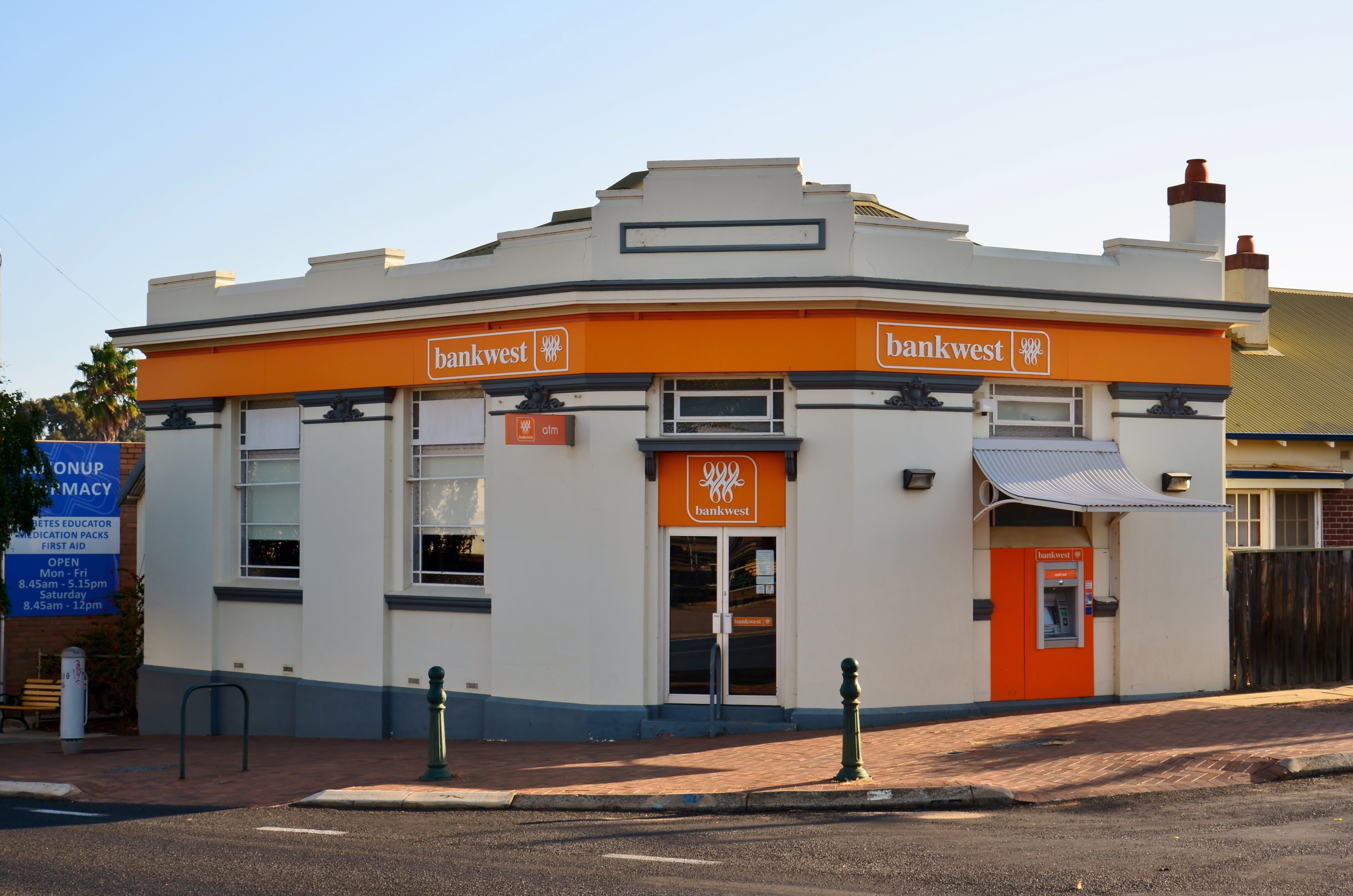
Bankwest branch in Kojonup in 2018

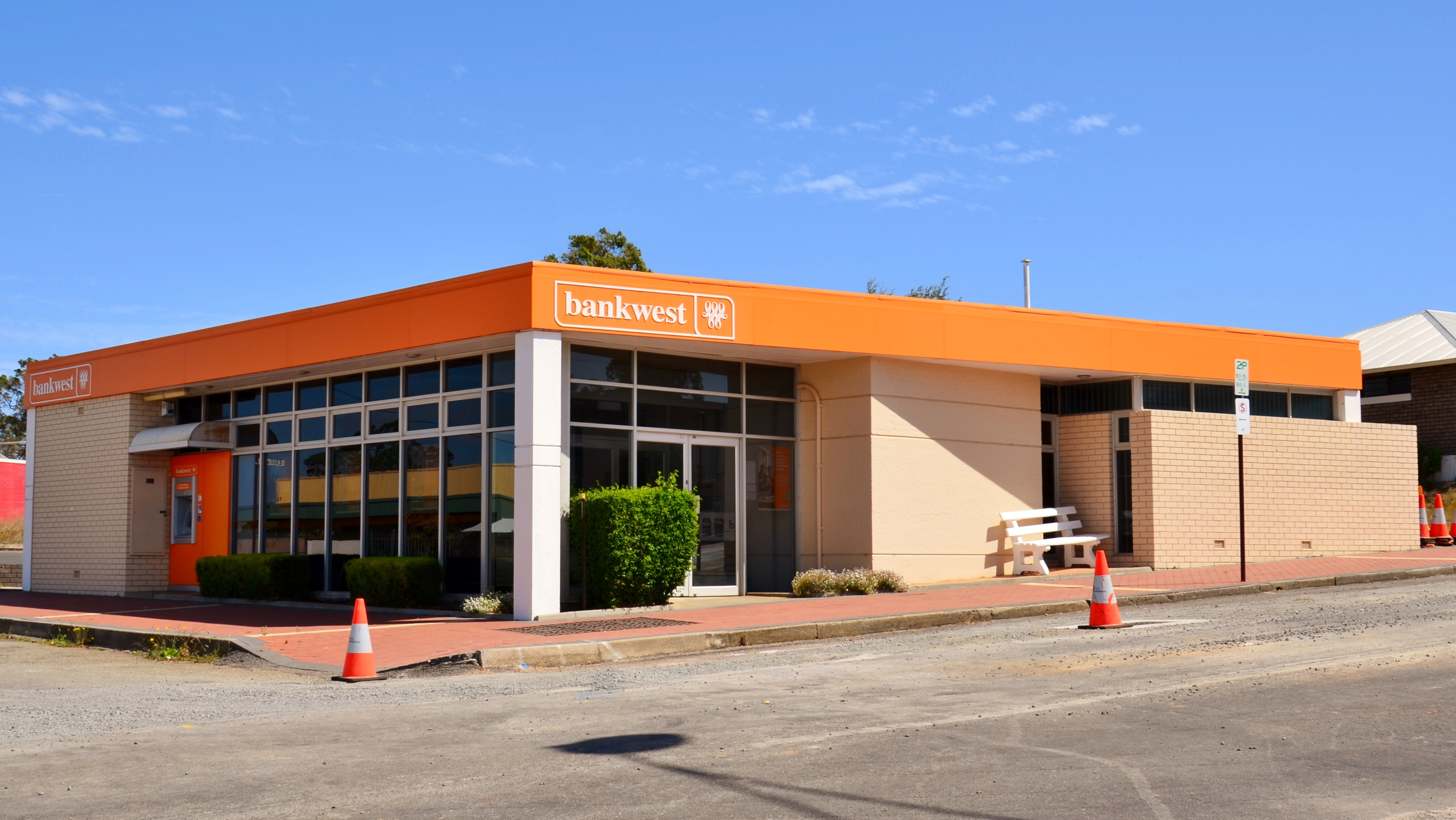
Bankwest branch in Mount Barker in 2018

=== Agricultural Bank era ===
In 1895, the Government of Western Australia established the Agricultural Bank of Western Australia as a rural lender to support the state's farming industries. Despite its name, it was not a bank, as it did not accept deposits from the public, its liabilities being government bonds. It was a government instrumentality that lent exclusively to farmers.

=== Rural & Industries Bank era ===
On 1 October 1945 pursuant to the Rural and Industries Bank Act 1944, the Agricultural Bank changed its name to the Rural and Industries Bank of Western Australia becoming a full trading bank. This enabled it to expand its retail and commercial banking services throughout the state. Its headquarters were at the former Agricultural Bank headquarters at 555 Hay Street, Perth.

In 1956 it became a savings bank. In March 1961, its headquarters moved to a purpose building in Barrack Street. In 1973, a 45% shareholding in Perpetual Finance Corporation was purchased increasing to 100% in 1978. A major shareholding in the Town & Country Permanent Building Society was also purchased in 1973.

In 1985, the first interstate branch was opened in Sydney. In June 1987, the Primary Industry Bank of Australia became a subsidiary. In August 1987, the Teachers' Credit Society was taken over in a bailout. In 1988, the headquarters moved to 108 St Georges Terrace, which was the tallest building in Perth at the time.

=== Bankwest era ===
The bank was incorporated in 1990, and in 1994 changed its name to the Bank of Western Australia with the trading name Bankwest, in preparation for privatisation. In December 1995, the Bank of Scotland acquired the bank, and as part of the sale agreement, offered 49 per cent of the shares in Bankwest to the public. Bankwest was listed on the Australian Securities Exchange (ASX) on 1 February 1996.

In May 2001, Bank of Scotland merged with Halifax to form HBOS. In August 2003, HBOS completed a successful takeover offer for the shares it did not own with Bankwest delisted from the ASX.

In 2003, Bankwest acquired API Finance from Australian Pharmaceutical Industries for $300 million in line with its industry specialisation growth strategy in the business banking segment.

In October 2006, Bankwest announced it would move its headquarters from 108 St Georges Terrace to 300 Murray Street. After lengthy delays, the move occurred in September 2012. Bankwest's lease expires in 2031.

In September 2008, Bankwest was included in the sale of HBOS to Lloyds TSB. The following month, with significant problems of its own during the 2008 financial crisis, Lloyds TSB agreed terms to sell Bankwest to the Commonwealth Bank for $2.1 billion. The sale was completed in December 2008.

Bankwest's business banking operation was closed and its customers moved to the Commonwealth Bank, sparking a senate inquiry.

In February 2022, Bankwest announced it would stop offering business products and services and eventually shift existing business customers to the Commonwealth Bank.

=== Branch closures ===
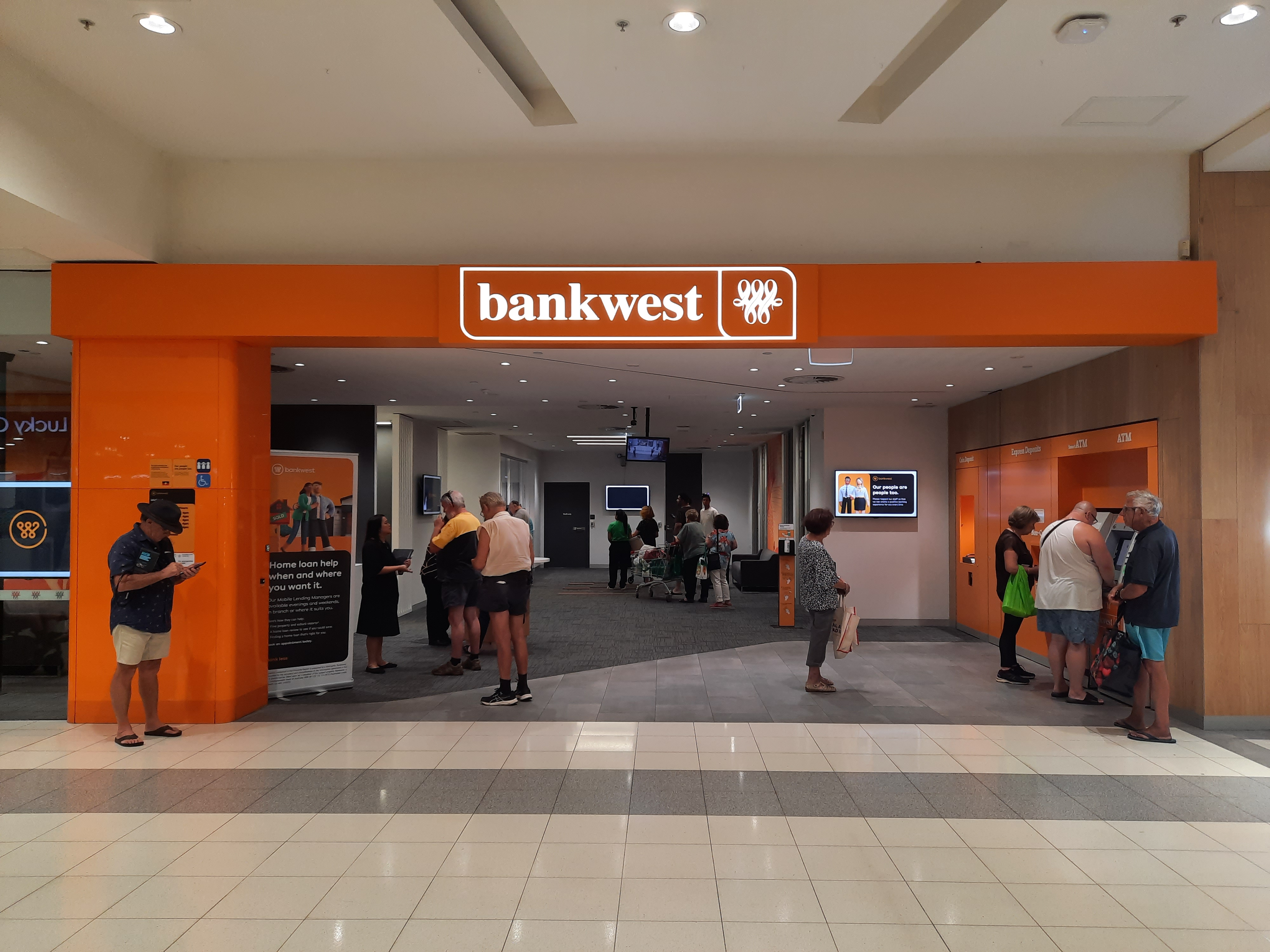
Bankwest branch at Midland Gate in March 2024

In July 2018, Bankwest announced plans to close 29 branches in New South Wales, Victoria and Queensland citing that an overwhelming number of its customers were choosing to bank online. In October 2022, Bankwest closed all its east coast branches.

In March 2024, Bankwest announced that it will close all remaining 60 branches and automated teller machines (ATMs) by the end of 2024 and become a digital bank. Fifteen regional branches will be converted to Commonwealth Bank branches and 45 closed. Cash transactions will be available via other banks' ATMs and Australia Post.

=== Digital Bank ===
As part of its digital transformation, Bankwest stated an ambition to become Australia’s favourite digital bank.

The Bankwest app allows customers to manage their finances and includes virtual cards, tools for viewing and managing transactions, and a subscriptions management feature that helps to identify recurring payments.

Bankwest’s online experiences are designed to meet a globally recognised standard for accessibility. The app received a Gold Award for App Design at the Good Design Australia Awards.

Bankwest has a strong broker proposition and is regularly ranked among the top lenders for its broker-focused policies and support in industry surveys and award recognition.

== Sponsorships ==
Bankwest was naming rights sponsor of the Fremantle Football Club in 2004 and 2005.

In 2018, Bankwest signed a seven-year contract to be the naming rights sponsor of Western Sydney Stadium. However, after only three years, the contract was taken over by the Commonwealth Bank and the stadium rebranded CommBank Stadium.

== See also ==
- Banking in Australia
- List of banks in Australia
- Timeline of banking in Western Australia
