= Lee Steere Stakes =

Horse race in Perth, Western Australia

Waroa-Lee Steere Stakes
- Class: Group 2
- Location: Ascot Racecourse
- Inaugurated: 1978
- Race type: Thoroughbred
- Sponsor: Afgri Equipment (2026)

Race information
- Distance: 1,400 metres
- Surface: Turf
- Track: Left-handed
- Qualification: Three year old and older
- Weight: Weight for age
- Purse: A$300,000 (2026)

The Lee Steere Stakes is a Perth Racing Group 2 Australian Thoroughbred horse race held under weight for age conditions, for horses aged three years old and older, over a distance of 1400 metres at Ascot Racecourse, Perth in November.

== History ==
The event is named after Ernest Augustus Lee Steere, former chairman of the Western Australian Turf Club and owner of the champion Eurythmic.

There is also a Lee Steere Classic raced at Ascot in November for three-year-olds over 1400 metres.

In 2003 the race was run at Belmont Park Racecourse.

Between 1989 and 2000 the race was held in mid December. Prior to 1989 the race was scheduled during the Perth Cup Carnival held close to New Year's Day.

== Name ==
- 1893–1938 - The All Aged Stakes
- 1939–2007 - Lee Steere Stakes
- 2008 onwards - Waroa-Lee Steere Stakes

=== Grade ===
- 1893–1978 - Principal race
- 1979 onwards - Group 2

=== Distance ===
- 1893–1938 - 1 mile (~1600 metres)
- 1938–1971 - 7 furlongs (~1400 metres)
- 1972–1984 – 1400 metres
- 1985–1992 – 1500 metres
- 1993 onwards - 1400 metres

== Winners ==
The following are past winners of the race.

- 2026 - King Of Light
- 2025 - Super Smink
- 2024 - Casino Seventeen
- 2023 - Valour Road
- 2022 - Massimo
- 2021 - Massimo
- 2020 - Kay Cee
- 2019 - Star Exhibit
- 2018 - Gatting
- 2017 - Silverstream
- 2016 - Perfect Reflection
- 2015 - Black Heart Bart
- 2014 - Magnifisio
- 2013 - Conservatorium
- 2012 - Luckygray
- 2011 - Ranger
- 2010 - Famous Roman
- 2009 - Idyllic Prince
- 2008 - Marasco
- 2007 - Grasspatch Girl
- 2006 - Belle Bizarre
- 2005 - Avenida Madero
- 2004 - Ellicorsam
- 2003 - Early Express
- 2002 - Hardrada
- 2001 - Tribula
- 2000 - Umrum
- 1999 - Slavonic
- 1998 - Pennyweight Point
- 1997 - Willoughby
- 1996 - Bradson
- 1995 - Century Blazer
- 1994 - Jacks Or Better
- 1993 - Wabasso
- 1992 - Welcome Knight
- 1991 - M'Lady's Jewel
- 1990 - Mister Till
- 1989 - Carry A Smile
- 1988 - Sky Filou
- 1987 - Denver Dame
- 1986 - Fair Sir
- 1985 - Concrete
- 1984 - Coal Pak
- 1983 - Argentine Gold
- 1982 - Getting Closer
- 1981 - Iko
- 1980 - Scarlet Gem
- 1979 - Asian Beau
- 1978 - Romantic Dream
- 1977 - Burgess Queen
- 1976 - Detonator
- 1976 - Sizzler
- 1975 - Merry Heart
- 1974 - Starglow
- 1972 - Millefleurs
- 1972 - La Trice
- 1971 - La Trice
- 1970 - Sherolythe
- 1969 - Chemech
- 1968 - Paper Cap
- 1967 - Railway Boy
- 1966 - Railway Boy
- 1965 - Norval Boy
- 1964 - All India
- 1963 - Big Bob
- 1962 - Big Bob
- 1961 - First Orl
- 1960 - Aquanita
- 1959 - Young Filipino
- 1958 - Ultramatic
- 1957 - Mcharry
- 1956 - Maniana
- 1955 - Chestnut Lady
- 1954 - Copper Beech
- 1953 - Winker
- 1952 - Letorna
- 1950 - Fawzia
- 1949 - St. Falcon
- 1949 - Garawind
- 1948 - Westralian
- 1947 - Santheine
- 1946 - Frangus
- 1944 - Lord Treat
- 1943 - Skyro
- 1942 - Dear Brutus
- 1941 - Azoth
- 1939 - Winbyie
- 1938 - Gay Gipsy
- 1938 - Tetreen
- 1936 - Cetotis
- 1935 - Old Story
- 1933 - Cetotis
- 1932 - no race
- 1931 - Einga
- 1930 - Pure Blend
- 1929 - Peggy Poet
- 1927 - Kongoni
- 1926 - Tich
- 1925 - Egyptian Idol
- 1924 - Honneur
- 1923 - Lilypond
- 1922 - Scorpius
- 1921 - Easingwold
- 1920 - Jolly Cosy
- 1920 - Mistico
- 1919 - Haud
- 1917 - Bardeur
- 1916 - Mistico
- 1916 - High Rock
- 1914 - Lucky Beggar
- 1914 - Tom Castro
- 1912 - Saturate
- 1911 - Artesian
- 1910 - Jolly Beggar
- 1910 - Annapolis
- 1908 - Lady Bobadil
- 1907 - May King
- 1907 - Enchanteur
- 1905 - Lady Agnes
- 1904 - Betsy Burke
- 1904 - Fifeness
- 1903 - Manlock
- 1901 - Cardinal
- 1901 - Reliance
- 1900 - Tarquin
- 1899 - Aqua
- 1898 - Tarquin
- 1897 - Tarquin
- 1896 - Carbonate
- 1895 - Scarpia
- 1894 - Scarpia
- 1893 - Scarpia

Note: The event has been raced several times in a calendar year because it was regularly scheduled during the Perth Cup Carnival which is held close to New Year's Day. Hence the event would sometimes be scheduled in late December.

== See also ==
- The Gold Rush (A J Scahill Stakes)
- Lee Steere Classic
- Northerly Stakes (Kingston Town Classic)
- Railway Stakes
- Ted Van Heemst Stakes
- WA Guineas
- List of Australian Group races
- Group races
