= Western Australian Development Corporation =

Historical Western Australian government entity

The Western Australian Development Corporation (WADC) was a trading corporation established in 1983 by the Burke ministry of Western Australia. It enabled the state Labor government to involve itself in large-scale business transactions without the normal transparency and accountability of government-guaranteed corporations, and was part of what became known as WA Inc. It appointed John Horgan chairman on a salary of $800,000 p.a., and formed subsidiaries including Exim Corporation which sought to create and exploit export markets for education and other products. The Western Australian Development Corporation Act 1983 provided that "(4.3) The Corporation is an agent of the Crown in right of the State and enjoys the status, immunities and privileges of the Crown..." while "(4.4) Notwithstanding subsection (3), the Corporation shall not be subject to direction by the Minister..."

[T]o make sure he kept secret the dealings of the WADC and its shady subsidiaries such as Exim Corporation, [Burke] pushed through legislation that not only gave them commercial confidentiality but unshackled them from ministerial accountability. The WADC was just one of many Burke creations synonymous with the corporatism of the WA Inc era – a failed political strategy that folded high-risk business into unethical government and led to financial and social upheaval still resonating a quarter of a century later.

— Tony Barrass (2009), Business and Labor at the birth of WA Inc, The Australian

The WADC's powers and accountability were heavily amended by succeeding governments. It was wound up on 30 June 1998.

== Origin of concept ==
The Australian Labor Party (WA Branch) state platform was amended at the party's August 1982 state conference to record a resolution that a Labor Government would "actively participate with private enterprise to establish a financial institution to be known as the Western Australian Development Corporation, for the purpose of attracting major inflows of capital to Western Australia and developing the Western Australia-based finance market". On the day after the 1983 state election, the incoming premier Brian Burke met with Laurie Connell, who was to become a regular financial adviser, and others, to whom he announced that he wanted to be involved with people in the local business community, and that the new government would set up the WADC.

== Property transactions ==
The central-Perth property and development transactions entered by the WADC between 1984 and 1988 were to become a specific term of reference for the WA Inc Royal Commission. In his role of state Treasurer, Burke had the statutory capacity to direct the financial affairs of substantial corporations including the State Government Insurance Commission (SGIC) and the Superannuation Board, later renamed the Government Employees' Superannuation Board (GESB), which was given sweeping new powers in 1987, enabling its extensive funds to be used for virtually any purpose approved by the Treasurer.

Burke was also able to control the day-to-day operations and decisions made by those bodies through the appointment of unqualified but compliant friends to senior positions. Persons so elevated included:

- Tony Lloyd, a local-government clerk who became the assistant under-treasurer, a commissioner of the SGIC and chairman of the GESB;
- Kevin Edwards, a trade-union official who became head of the Premier's Department and board member of both the SGIC and the GESB;
- Len Brush, the husband of Burke's private secretary, who became chairman of the GESB and also held a WADC managerial position

=== David Jones site ===
In early 1985, the central-Perth site of a former David Jones department store owned by the Midtown Property Trust, a unit trust in which the units were held by or on behalf of Bond Corporation and Connell, was offered for sale to the Superannuation Board, which contracted to spend $11,175,000 on a 50% interest in a joint redevelopment venture. However, the Superannuation Board was to bear the entire cost of the project, making an elaborate loan to materialise Midtown's share of the expenses. When the agreement was drafted, in April 1985, the two parties were also planning "to secure title to the Perth Technical College site".

=== Perth Technical College site ===
The Perth Technical College site was 1.15 hectares (2.8 acres) of Crown land in a prime central location on the main street, St Georges Terrace, and opposite the David Jones site. In May 1984, Burke requested the WADC to manage development of the site, on which stood one important heritage building, the 1910 Technical School designed by Hillson Beasley. It was the first property sale handled by the WADC and was converted to freehold title by the issue of a Crown grant, in return for which the state received $20.5 million. The new title took effect on 10 December 1985, but on 20 September, the WADC received a purchase offer of $33.5 million from the Superannuation Board, Bond Corporation and Laurie Connell. It was proposed to lease the property back to the Education Department for $2 million p.a.

== See also ==
- List of Australian political controversies
