= State Electricity Commission of Western Australia =

Former power provider in Western Australia

Agency overview
- Formed: 20 March 1946
- Dissolved: 31 December 1974
- Superseding agency: State Energy Commission of Western Australia
- Jurisdiction: Western Australia
- Headquarters: Perth

The State Electricity Commission of Western Australia was a Government of Western Australia owned and managed energy provider. It was constituted on 20 March 1946, purchasing the City of Perth Electricity and Gas Department.

The electricity undertaking of the Fremantle Municipal Tramways and Electric Lighting Board was purchased in 1952.

It saw the introduction of piped gas into the south west of Western Australia, as well as other infrastructure developments in its time.

It was superseded by the State Energy Commission of Western Australia on 1 January 1975.
