= Ernest Augustus Lee Steere =

Australian businessman (1866–1957)

Sir Ernest Augustus Lee Steere (19 March 1866 – 22 December 1957) was a prominent Australian businessman and pastoralist.

== Biography ==
Lee Steere was born on 19 March 1866 in Beverley and was the second son of Augustus Lee Steere. He worked in the Murchison on various stations during the 1880s and eventually bought Belele Station, near Meekatharra in 1888. The property was mostly undeveloped at the time but Lee Steere soon brought it to a state of high production. Later, he and his son Ernest would found the merino studs at Chilimony and Bowes near Northampton. In his time at Belele he expanded its size from 250,000 acres (101,171 ha) to 900,000 acres (364,217 ha) and acquired nearby Annean Station.

His interests later expanded and he was partly responsible for the freezing works at Fremantle and the woollen works in Albany. He had close ties with Elders, Smith and Co., The AMP Society and the WA Trustee, Executor and Agency company Ltd. Lee Steere was also on the committee of the Fairbridge Farm school in Pinjarra who sponsored the migration of British children to Australia.

In 1946 he donated a farm at Mingenew, worth £8000, for returning servicemen as part of a settlement scheme for sub-division.

== Family ==
Lee Steere was descended from one of the prominent so-called six hungry families of Perth, which included his uncle, Sir James George Lee Steere (1830-1903).

His wife was Bridget Yelverton O'Connor (the youngest daughter of C. Y. O'Connor), who was prominent in her own right, as Commissioner of Girl Guides in Western Australia from 1931 to 1953. She was awarded an OBE and Girl Guiding's highest honour for adults, the Silver Fish Award.

His son, Ernest Henry Lee-Steere was also a prominent businessman in Western Australia and served as Lord Mayor of Perth in the 1970s, while his grandson John Dawkins was federal treasurer in the 1990s.
