= C. Y. O'Connor =

Irish engineer in New Zealand and Western Australia (1843–1902)

Charles Yelverton O'Connor
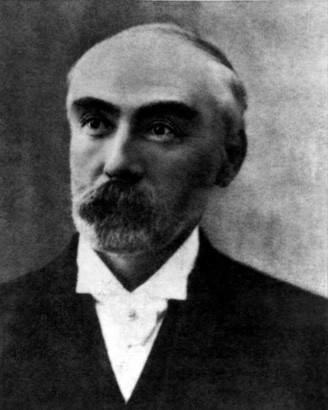
- C. Y. O'Connor, 1891
- Born: 11 January 1843; Gravelmount House, Castletown, County Meath, Ireland
- Died: 10 March 1902 (aged 59); Robb Jetty, South Fremantle, Western Australia
- Occupation: Engineer
- Spouse: Susan Laetitia Ness (m.1873–1902; his death)
- Children: 8, including Kathleen, Eva and Bridget

Charles Yelverton O'Connor, CMG (11 January 1843 – 10 March 1902), was an Irish engineer who is best known for his work in Western Australia, especially the construction of Fremantle Harbour, thought to be impossible, and the Goldfields Water Supply Scheme.

== Early life ==
O'Connor was born in Gravelmount House, a small country house in Castletown Kilpatrick, a parish located between Kells and Ardee in the north of County Meath in Ireland. He was the third and youngest son and fourth child of John O'Connor, a farmer and company secretary, and his wife Mary Elizabeth, née O'Keefe. O'Connor was home-schooled by his aunt before being educated at Waterford Endowed School (also known as Bishop Foy's School). In 1859 he was apprenticed to John Chaloner Smith as a railway engineer. At the age of 21 he emigrated to New Zealand, and on 6 September 1866 was appointed assistant engineer for Canterbury Province under Edward Dobson.

His first task was the construction of the Otira Gorge section of the road over Arthur's Pass, so that the gold fields on the West Coast became easier to access. After holding other positions, O'Connor became inspecting engineer for the mid-South Island. In 1873 he married Scottish-born Susan Laetitia Ness, and they had eight children, four girls (including Girl Guiding commissioner Bridget Yelverton Lee Steere and painter Kathleen O'Connor) and four boys while in New Zealand (their fifth child, Charles Goring Yelverton O'Connor, died aged 7 months in a home accident). In 1883 O'Connor was appointed Under-Secretary of Public Works in New Zealand, and in 1890 he was appointed Marine Engineer for the colony.

In April 1891, O'Connor resigned his position to become Engineer-in-Chief of Western Australia. His wife and children relocated with him to Australia. There he was responsible for constructing Fremantle Harbour and the Goldfields Water Supply Scheme project, which supplied water to the Eastern Goldfields. He was the inaugural Engineer in Chief of the Public Works Department.

== Fremantle Harbour ==
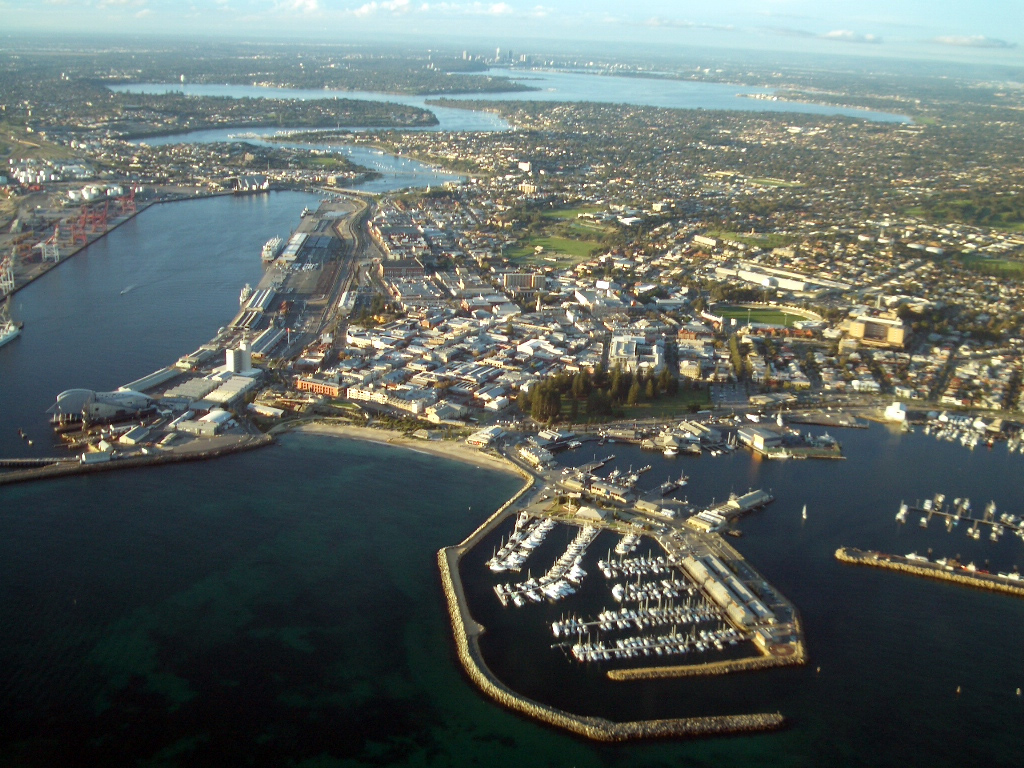
Aerial view of Fremantle Harbour

The construction of Fremantle Harbour was probably O'Connor's greatest personal triumph, as his proposal to build the harbour within the entrance to the Swan River was contrary to previous expert advice that this was impracticable and that the construction would require constant dredging. Work commenced in 1892 in removing a limestone bar and sand shoals at the mouth of the Swan River and was successfully completed in 1903. On 4 May 1897 the first ocean-going steamer, the Sultan, berthed at South Quay (renamed Victoria Quay on 26 July 1901 in honour of the late Queen Victoria). At age 54, O'Connor travelled to London to be inducted a Companion of the Order of St Michael and St George.

More than 100 years of continued use of Fremantle Harbour by heavy shipping has erased all doubt concerning O'Connor's technical judgement.

== Railways ==
O'Connor was engineer-in-chief and acting general manager of railways in Western Australia. Upgrades of existing lines and plans for new lines were made. The search for water for the Northam-Southern Cross route was initiated by O'Connor. He was in charge of the railway.

== Goldfields Water Supply Scheme ==
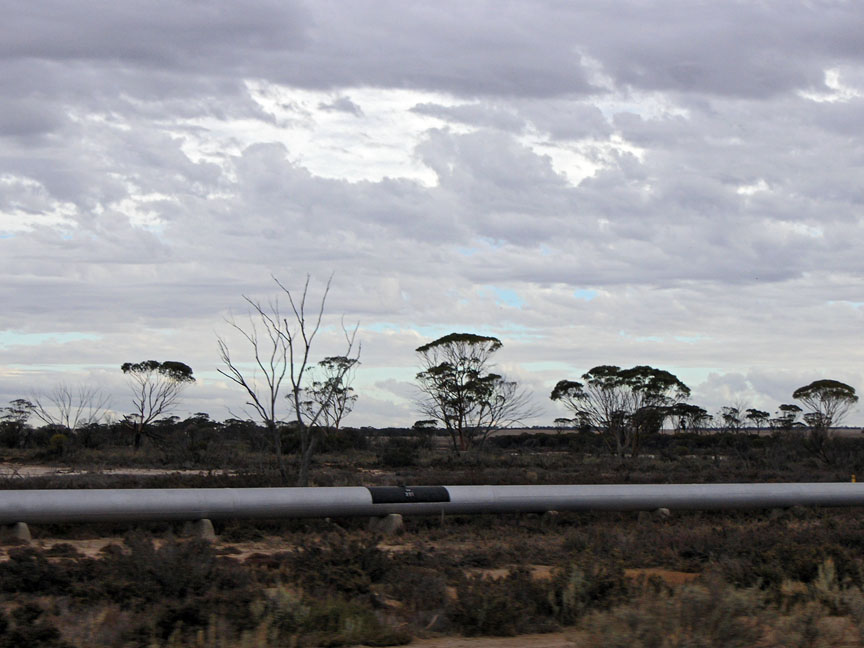
Goldfields Pipeline along Great Eastern Highway

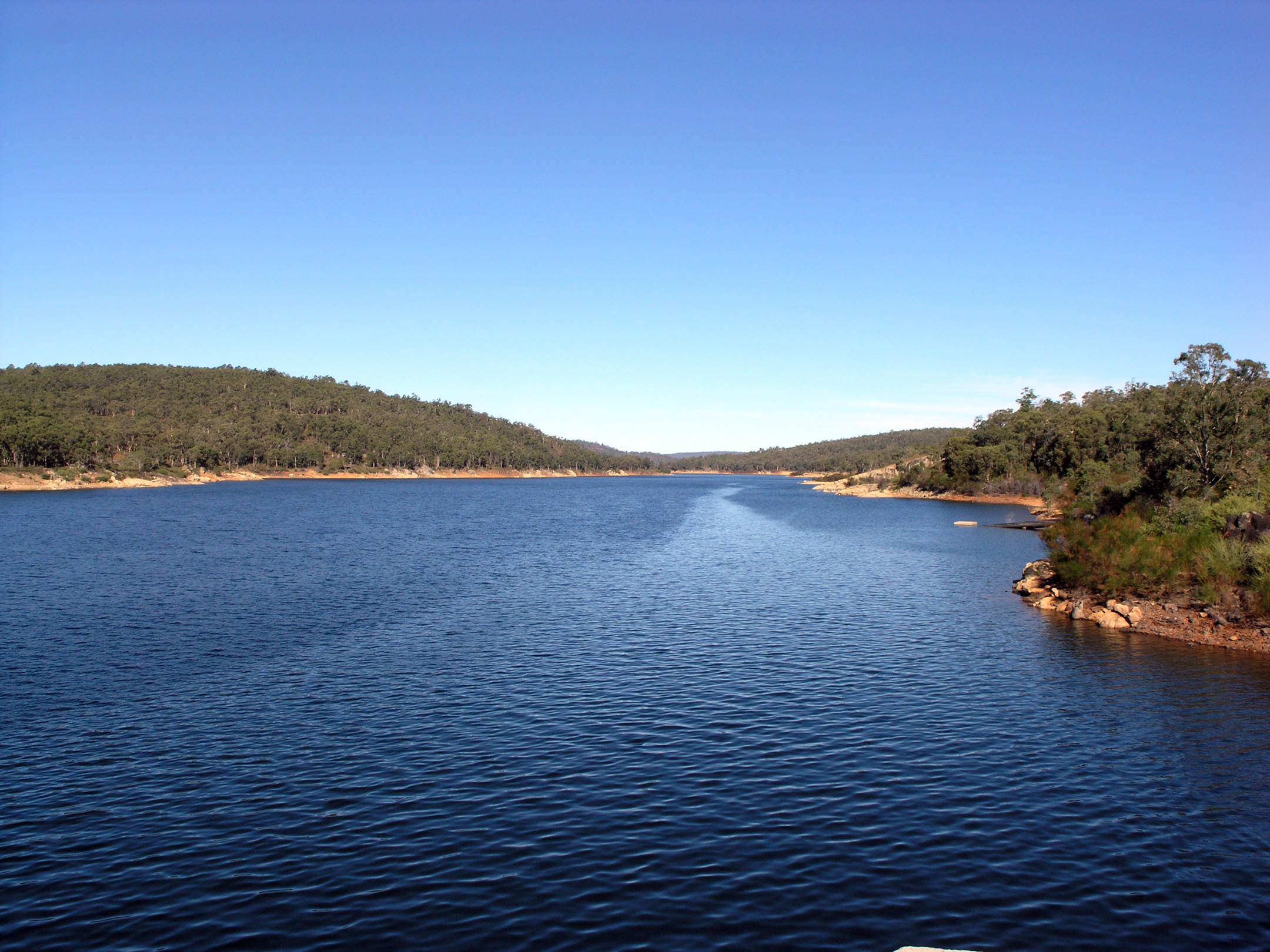
Lake O'Connor, Mundaring Weir

O'Connor is best known for his work on the Goldfields Water Supply Scheme, also known as the Goldfields Pipeline. The pipeline carries water 330 miles (530 km) from Perth to Kalgoorlie. A succession of gold rushes at Southern Cross in 1887, at Coolgardie in 1892, and at Kalgoorlie in 1893 caused a population explosion in the barren and dry desert centre of Western Australia, exemplified by towns like Cunderdin and Merredin. On 16 July 1896, John Forrest introduced to Western Australian Parliament a bill to authorise the raising of a loan of £2.5 million to construct the scheme: the pipeline would pump 5 million imperial gallons (23,000 m^{3}) of water per day to the Goldfields from a dam on the Helena River near Mundaring Weir in Perth, pumped in eight successive stages through 330 miles of 30-inch-diameter (760 mm) pipe to the Mount Charlotte Reservoir in Kalgoorlie. The water is then reticulated to various mining centres in the Goldfields.

The lake created by Mundaring Weir is now known as Lake O'Connor, and still provides drinking water for the towns along the pipeline to Kalgoorlie.

== Death ==
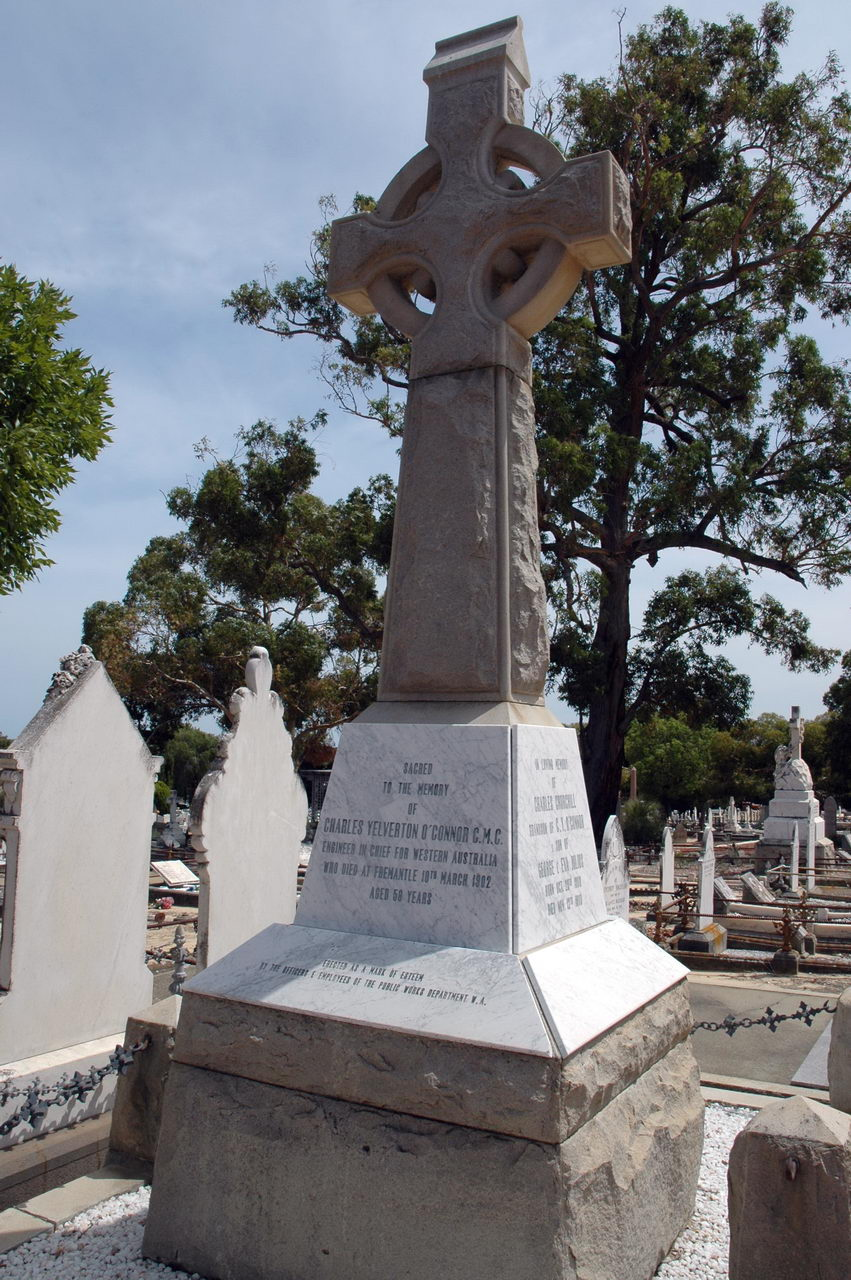
The grave of C. Y. O'Connor, Fremantle Cemetery

O'Connor was subjected to prolonged criticism by members of the press and also many members of the Western Australian Parliament over the scheme. John Forrest, always a supporter, had left Western Australian politics to become federal defence minister. Defamatory attacks by the press had wounded O'Connor.

Evans describes how political machinations and individual greed led to many libellous newspaper articles about O'Connor towards the end of the pipeline project. One article in particular in The Sunday Times, 9 February 1902, by its editor, Thomas Walker, continuing a campaign against O'Connor by Walker's deceased predecessor Frederick Vosper, is thought to have contributed to his death. Accusing O'Connor of corruption, it read, in part:

... And apart from any distinct charge of corruption this man has exhibited such gross blundering or something worse, in his management of great public works it is no exaggeration to say that he has robbed the taxpayer of this state of many millions of money ... This crocodile imposter has been backed up in all his reckless extravagant juggling with public funds, in all his nefarious machinations behind the scenes by the kindred-souled editor of The West Australian. —(Evans 2001:219)

The government conducted an inquiry into the scheme and found no basis for the press accusations of corruption or misdemeanours on the part of O'Connor. Thomas Walker claimed vindication as the Royal Commission into the Coolgardie Water Scheme found "of the degree to which his [O'Connor's] implicit trust had been misplaced [in Thomas C. Hodgson, the Engineer in Charge of the Coolgardie Water Scheme]... unbalanced an already overstrained mind".

It is claimed that local Noongar Aboriginal people, unhappy with his destruction of the limestone bar across the Swan River at Point Walter, placed a curse on O'Connor. and that "... they sang him to make him crazy", and his suicide was the result. O'Connor took his own life on 10 March 1902 by shooting himself at the water's edge after riding his horse to Robb Jetty, south of Fremantle. Less than a year later, Forrest officially commissioned the Goldfields Water Supply Scheme.

== Legacy ==
O'Connor's greatest legacies are the Fremantle Inner Harbour and the Goldfields Water supply Scheme, which ranks as one of Australia's greatest engineering achievements.

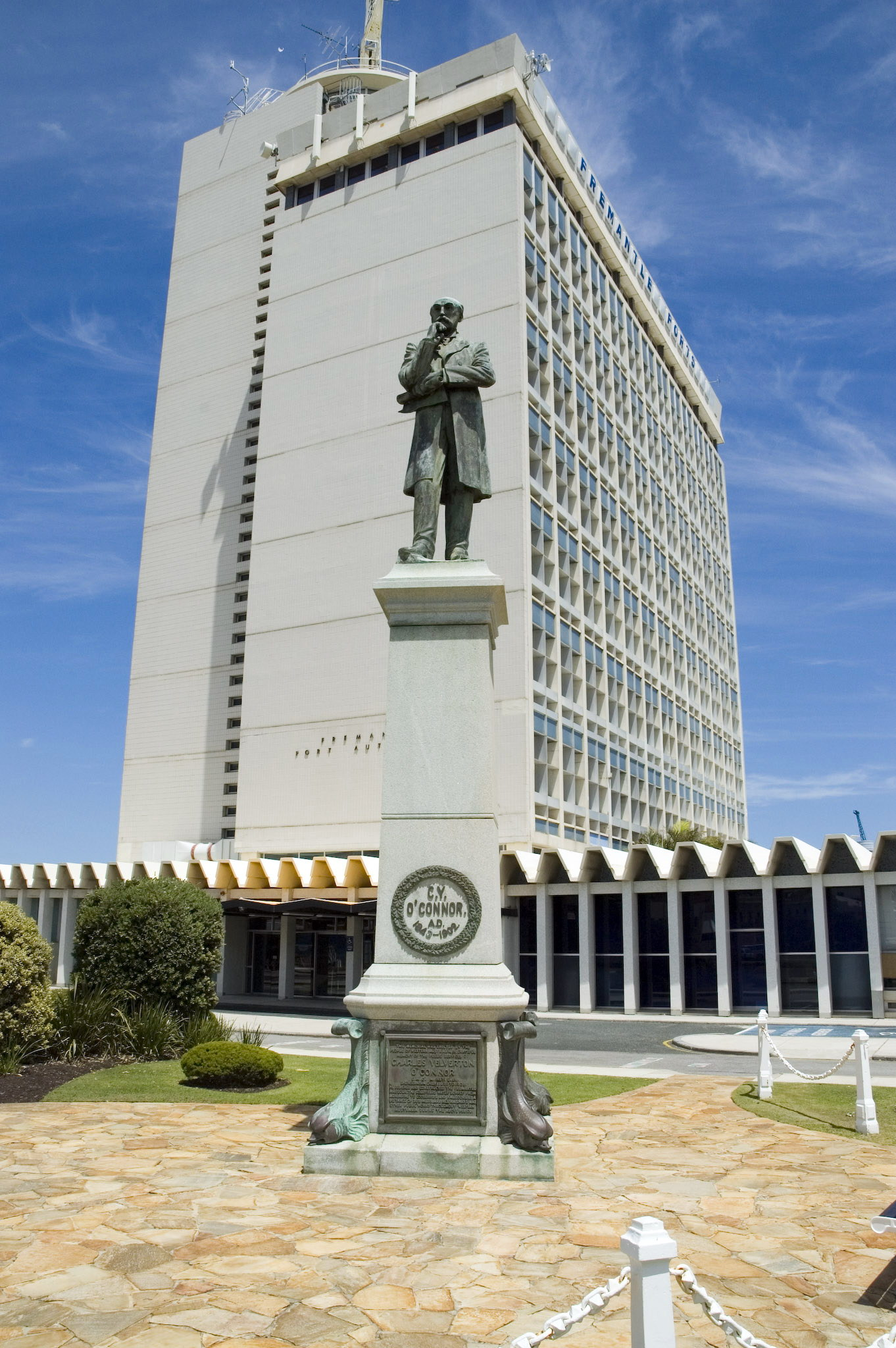
Pietro Porcelli's statue of O'Connor, Fremantle Port. The statue faces north-east towards Fremantle Harbour.

The beach where O'Connor died was named after him and there is also a statue sculpted by Tony Jones, of him in the water there.

The Monument to C. Y. O'Connor was built in 1911 and was designed by Pietro Porcelli.

The novel The Drowner by Robert Drewe provides a fictionalised account of O'Connor and the building of the pipeline.

On 7 December 1898, his daughter Eva married Sir George Julius at St John's Church, Fremantle. Julius was the first chairman of the Council for Scientific and Industrial Research (CSIR) which later became the CSIRO.

His daughter Kathleen O'Connor was a successful and respected painter.

The C. Y. O'Connor College of TAFE in Western Australia bears his in name.

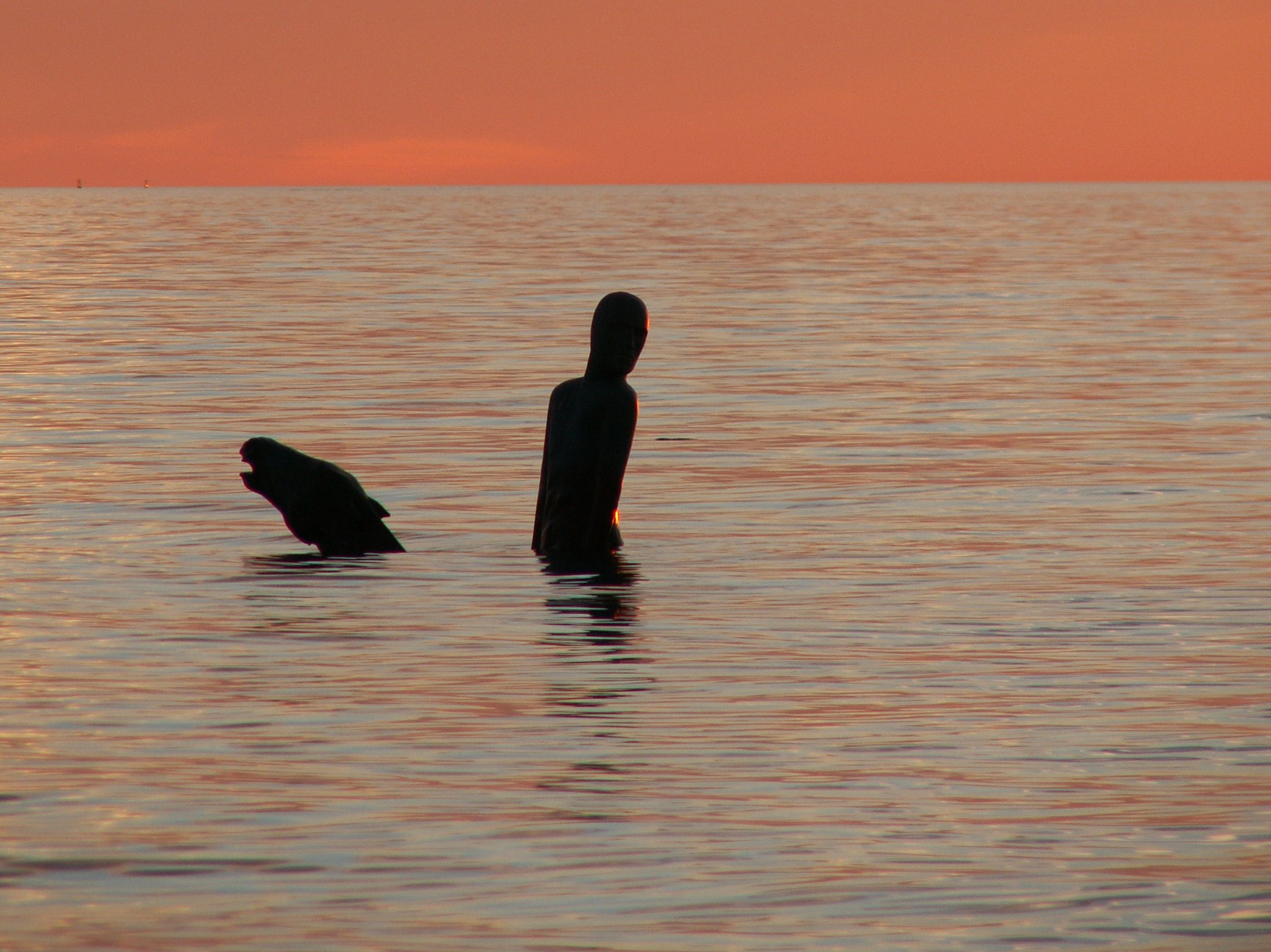
Statue of O'Connor and horse at C.Y. O'Connor beach

The Division of O'Connor, named after O'Connor, is an Australian Electoral Division in the state of Western Australia. Originally it encircled the area around Perth, from Geraldton on the Indian Ocean coast to Albany on the Southern Ocean coast. The electoral boundary was changed dramatically in 2008 (taking effect in 2010) and it now includes the Southern Wheatbelt and most of the Goldfields of Western Australia.

A bronze statue of O'Connor by Pietro Porcelli stands in front of the Fremantle Port Authority buildings, commemorating O'Connor's achievements. O'Connor has also had a school named after him called O'Connor Primary School, in Kalgoorlie-Boulder.

A song called 'C.Y. O'Connor' by a local Irish band based in Western Australian named The Healys was written in memory of the Irish engineer.
