= State Energy Commission of Western Australia =

Former power provider in Western Australia

Agency overview
- Formed: 1 July 1975
- Preceding agency: State Electricity Commission of Western Australia
- Dissolved: 31 December 1994
- Superseding agencies: AlintaGas; Western Power Corporation
- Jurisdiction: Western Australia
- Headquarters: Perth

The State Energy Commission of Western Australia was an Australian energy provider. It was established on 1 January 1975 as an amalgamation of the State Electricity Commission of Western Australia and the Fuel and Power Commission.

In 1986, it purchased the Fremantle Gas and Coke Company which later attracted the interest of the WA Inc royal commission. On 1 January 1995 it was split up into separate gas and electricity utilities AlintaGas and Western Power Corporation.
