= Ernest Henry Lee-Steere =

Australian businessman

Sir Ernest Henry Lee-Steere, KBE (22 December 1912 – 9 January 2011) was a prominent Australian businessman. He was particularly noted for his involvement in horse racing in Western Australia, becoming chairman of the Western Australian Turf Club from 1963 to 1984. He was also Lord Mayor of Perth from 1972 to 1978.

== Biography ==
Lee-Steere was born on 22 December 1912. He was a captain in the AIF in the Army/Air Liaison Group, serving with No. 1 Squadron, RAAF Beauforts, 31 Squadron Beaufighter, RAAF, South West Pacific Area, during World War II.

Lee-Steere's interest in the sport of horse racing followed his father's; the latter had been chairman of the Western Australian Turf Club (WATC) from 1919 to 1940. Lee-Steere joined the WATC in 1933 and was elected to the committee in 1948. He became vice-chairman in 1959 and was chairman for 21 years from 1963. The headquarters of the WATC, which is now part of Racing and Wagering Western Australia, were opened in 1986 and named Lee-Steere House after him, and the Lee Steere Stakes is a $200,000 Group 2, three-year-old 1,400-metre Feature race run annually at Ascot Racecourse in Perth. The Listed Lee Steere Classic is also named after him.

Lee-Steere died on 9 January 2011, aged 98.

== Family ==
Lee-Steere was descended from one of the prominent so-called six hungry families of Perth, which included his great uncle, Sir James George Lee Steere (1830–1903) and father Sir Ernest Augustus Lee Steere (1866–1957). His mother was Bridget Yelverton Lee Steere (1884–1979); the youngest daughter of C. Y. O'Connor, she was prominent in her own right, as Commissioner of Girl Guides in Western Australia for about 17 years. He was married to Jessica Lee-Steere (née Venn) for 60 years, and was predeceased by his wife in 2001.

Lee-Steere's two brothers died in WW2, and he created the sanctuary at St Stephen's Anglican Church, Toodyay in their memory.

Lee-Steere's daughter Jemma is noted for being partner to Perth businessman Ric Stowe for 10 years from 1980. After the relationship ended, she sued Stowe for A$250 million.

Lee-Steere's other daughter, Vynka, was briefly an actress, appearing in the Australian soap-opera Certain Women, before later attaining a Doctor of Philosophy in Psychology and operating a private practice in Perth.

== Honours ==
Lee-Steere was made a Knight Commander of the Order of the British Empire in the New Year's Honours of 1988.
