= Bridget Yelverton Lee Steere =

Australian Girl Guide leader

Bridget Yelverton Lee Steere OBE
- Lady Lee Steere (1948)
- Born: 24 February 1884; Wellington, New Zealand
- Died: 23 July 1979 (aged 95); Perth, Western Australia
- Other names: Lady Lee Steere; Biddy
- Occupation: Girl Guide leader

Bridget Yelverton Lee Steere, Lady Lee Steere OBE (née O'Connor; 24 February 1884 - 23 July 1979) was State Commissioner for Western Australia Girl Guides from 1931 to 1953. She was a recipient of the Silver Fish Award, Girl Guiding's highest adult honour. She was a lifetime member of the YWCA.

== Early life ==
Bridget Yelverton O'Connor was born in New Zealand to Susan Laetitia and Charles Yelverton O'Connor. She was one of seven children, including Lady Julius. The family moved to Western Australia in 1891.

== Girl Guides ==
Lee Steere was enrolled into Girl Guiding by Chief Guide Lady Baden-Powell during her visit to Australia in 1931.

From 1931 to 1953 she was Acting State Commissioner, and then State Commissioner for Western Australia Girl Guides. In 1934 she represented Australia at the 8th WAGGGS World Conference at Our Chalet, Switzerland. In 1935 she attended a Commissioner Training Camp at Foxlease, New Forest, England. In reference to her Guiding activity in 1937 she was called “one of the busiest women in the west” by The Australian Women's Weekly.

As part of her 1931 trip to Australia, Lady Baden-Powell brought a Cenotaph flag to present to Australia's Girl Guide Association. These were flags that had been retired from their role at the Cenotaph in London, donated to the Imperial War Museum and subsequently redistributed to relevant organisations around the world. Steere carried this flag to many parts of Australia during her tenure as State Commissioner.

During World War II she set up a War Time Work Party, to help Britain's bombed areas. She initiated fundraising towards the cost of two air ambulances, a lifeboat for Red Cross Polish Relief work, and the Australian Comforts Fund, an initiative to "Keep the Fit Man Fit" by providing items such as soap and razors for soldiers.

The Lady Lee Steere Training Centre was built in Boyup Brook, Western Australia.

Upon her retirement as State Commissioner in 1953, she was presented with a silver sugar spoon with a miniature Brownie on the top as a gift from the 1,600 Brownies in the state.

In 1958 the second phase of work began on Paxwold, Western Australia's Girl Guide campsite and training centre. The main training room was named after her and she formally opened the building on 19 March 1960.

== Other work ==
Lee Steere was a lifetime member of the YWCA. From 1922 to 1928 she was on the board of governors, from 1930 to 1939 she was President. She retired as Vice President in 1950.

She was a founder of the Flying Angel Guild, to work for Missions to Seamen.

In 1946 Lady and Sir Lee Steere donated £2,000 to the Flying Angel's Missions to Seamen to endow a chapel in memory of two of their sons who were killed in action in World War II. The Lee Steere Memorial Chapel was located at the Mariner's House in Fremantle, Perth.

In 1950 she became the patron of the Western Australia Women's Society of Fine Arts and Crafts.

== Personal life ==
She married Ernest Augustus Lee Steere (1866-1957) in 1910. They had five children: their son Ernest Henry Lee-Steere (1912-2011) was a prominent businessman and became Lord Mayor of Perth, and two other sons died in World War II. Her husband was knighted in 1948, making her Lady Lee Steere. She died in Perth, Western Australia, aged 95.

== Awards ==
- 1947 – Silver Fish Award Girl Guiding’s highest adult award, presented by Lady Baden-Powell
- 1953 – Coronation Medal awarded by Queen Elizabeth II
- 1960 – OBE in the 1960 New Year Honours for her work with Western Australian Girl Guides and YWCA
