= Laurie Connell =

Western Australian businessman

- Born: 2 April 1946; Perth, Western Australia, Australia
- Died: 27 February 1996 (aged 49); Peppermint Grove, Western Australia
- Occupation: Entrepreneur
- Conviction: Perverting the course of justice
- Penalty: 5 years imprisonment

Lawrence Robert "Laurie" Connell (2 April 1946 – 27 February 1996) was a Western Australian business entrepreneur. As chairman of the Rothwells merchant bank, he was well known for his dealings with the Government of Western Australia and his close relationships with a former premier of Western Australia, Brian Burke, and with entrepreneur Alan Bond, during the WA Inc period in the mid to late 1980s.

Laurie Connell was the grandson of a long-serving Western Australia Police Commissioner, Robert Connell (1867–1956) commissioner 1913–1933.

In 1994, Connell was jailed for conspiring to pervert the course of justice by paying a jockey to leave the country.

== Horse-racing scandals ==
=== 1975 disqualification ===
Connell was reportedly warned off by stewards in 1975 for involvement in a betting scam at the Kalgoorlie races. Despite that, he became well connected in the Perth racing establishment and, in 1984, he sought election to a position on the committee of The Western Australian Turf Club, with the support of the committee's retiring chairman Sir Ernest Lee-Steere.

=== Danny Hobby ===
At the January 1983 AHA Cup in Bunbury, jockey Danny Hobby jumped from his mount Strike Softly. Hobby later claimed he jumped after accepting a bribe of $5,000 from Connell to do so.

Almost a decade later, it was alleged that Hobby was paid over $1 million by Connell to travel around the world for several years to avoid returning to Australia and facing an inquiry. Ultimately Hobby did return and Connell was tried and sentenced to five years jail for conspiracy to pervert the course of justice during the investigation into the horse race. Hobby received a three-year term. Found not guilty of fixing the race, Connell served one year of his sentence in jail before being released.

=== Rocket Racer ===
In the 1987 3,200-metre (two-mile) Perth Cup, Connell's horse Rocket Racer, ridden by leading Western Australian jockey J. J. Miller, won the race by nine lengths and could not be pulled up, doing nearly another lap of the course. Connell had backed the horse, initially at long odds, down to a 2/1 favouritism, and was believed to have collected $500,000 from bookmakers, as well as the $210,000 prize money for the win.

The horse's performance, and subsequent collapse and death from unknown causes a few weeks later, was never fully investigated or explained, although it is generally assumed that it had been injected with etorphine ("elephant juice"). Rocket Racer was trained by Buster O'Malley, but another Connell-owned horse trained by George Way, had tested positive to etorphine a few weeks earlier, which had led to a long disqualification for Way.

== Rothwells ==
During the 1980s, Connell started acquiring numerous local businesses through aggressive takeovers, before setting himself up as a deposit taker for investors under the name of Rothwells Merchant Bank, which had begun its life as a Brisbane-based menswear chain. Immediately after the 1987 stock market crash, there was a run on the bank by local investors.

Connell put together a rescue package involving numerous Australian businessmen, and approached the premier, Brian Burke, who provided a A$150 million government guarantee to provide short-term relief. Despite that, after Burke's resignation on 25 February 1988, incoming premier Peter Dowding was required to enter very complicated and controversial dealings in an attempt to protect the government's interests.

Rothwells ultimately went into liquidation, resulting in heavy losses to the government and Rothwells investors. A royal commission later found that:

Mr Dowding, as premier, presided over a disastrous series of decisions designed to support Rothwells when it was or should have been clear to him and to those ministers closely involved that Rothwells was no longer a viable financial institution. This culminated in the decision to involve the Government, through WAGH, in the Kwinana petrochemical project as a means of removing the Government's contingent liability for certain of the debts of Rothwells. Electoral advantage was preferred to the public interest.

The political fallout from the collapse, as well as other government dealings during the period, dominated media and political discourse in Western Australia during 1990, and premier Carmen Lawrence ultimately called the royal commission in November 1990 to investigate. The inquiry became known as the WA Inc royal commission and resulted in the jailing of Connell and a number of other involved parties.

== Dispersal of estate ==
Connell died bankrupt. At the date of bankruptcy there was a deficiency of $341 million and additional pending claims of $60 million. In 1998, the trustee seized artworks which were sold for about $30,000. In 2000 the trustees raised a further $120,000 from sale of artworks.
