= Amelia Bunbury =

Australian artist and horse breeder (1863–1956)

Amelia Bunbury née Pries
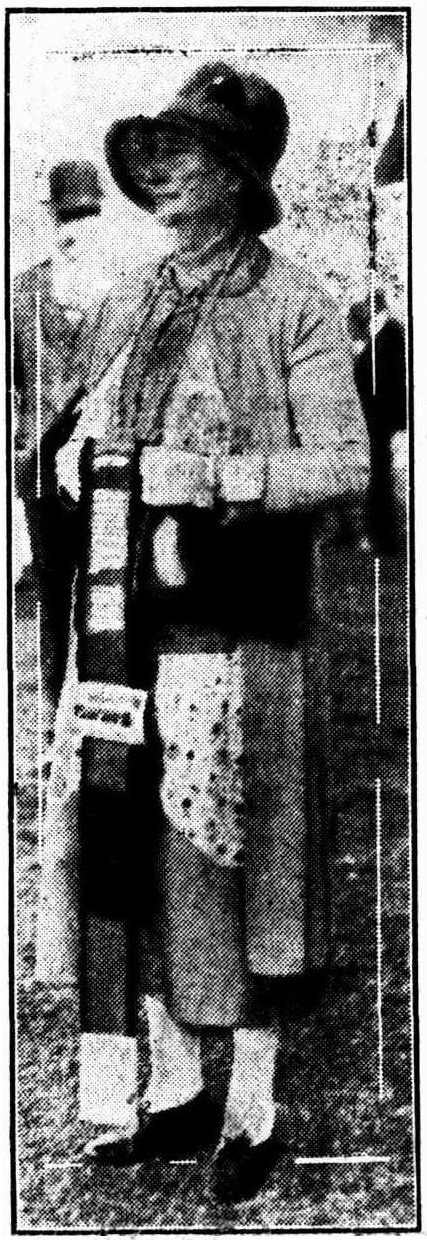
- Portrait of Amelia Bunbury in 1932.
- Born: 1863; Western Australia, Australia
- Died: 1956 (aged 92–93); Bunbury, Western Australia, Australia
- Occupations: Australian horse breeder, photographer, sculptor, and botanical collector
- Years active: 1894–1895 (botanical collector), 1900–1909 (wood carving), 1901–1910 (photography)

Amelia Matilda Richardson Pries Bunbury (1863–1956), better known as Amelia Bunbury, was a noted photographer, furniture carver, horse breeder, and botanical collector based in south-west and north-west Western Australia.

== Life ==
Amelia Matilda Richardson Pries was born in Western Australia to Robert Ferdinand Pries (1821-1905), horse breeder and merchant, and Matilda Pries (1825 - 1911). She spent her childhood at Prospect Villa in Busselton, which her father had purchased in 1860. Amelia eventually inherited the property and at her death in 1956, "the house was still furnished with much of the period furniture that the Pries family had brought out from England."

In 1897, Amelia married Mervyn Corry Richardson-Bunbury (1858-1910), and they moved to remote Williambury station, near Minilya in north-western Western Australia. Following the death of her husband in 1910, Amelia left Williambury and returned to her family home of Prospect Villa, Busselton. She died in Perth, at the age of 93 in 1956.

== Photography and furniture carving ==
After her move to Williambury, Amelia started to publish photographs in the Western Mail and other publications under the pseudonym Coyarre, including images of Indigenous people. She was featured in The Great North West and its Resources, published 1904. In 1905, her work was featured in the photographic booklet Busselton & District Illustrated, and she exhibited a set of picture postcards in the 1907 Exhibition of Women's Work in Melbourne. Examples of Amelia's photography are held by the State Library of Western Australia.

She won multiple photography competitions in the Western Mail, a weekly Western Australian newspaper, with a particular focus on depicting contemporary "station life," but also other topics in 1900, 1901, 1902, 1904, 1905, and 1906. Amelia's photography of Indigenous people has been criticised as being posed in the style "suggested by anthropological photographers of the day," that was created under "the instructions of the white woman in authority."

In the first decade of the 1900s, Amelia studied woodcarving at the Perth Technical School, who decorated her home with her hand-carved furniture.

Examples of work as Coyarre
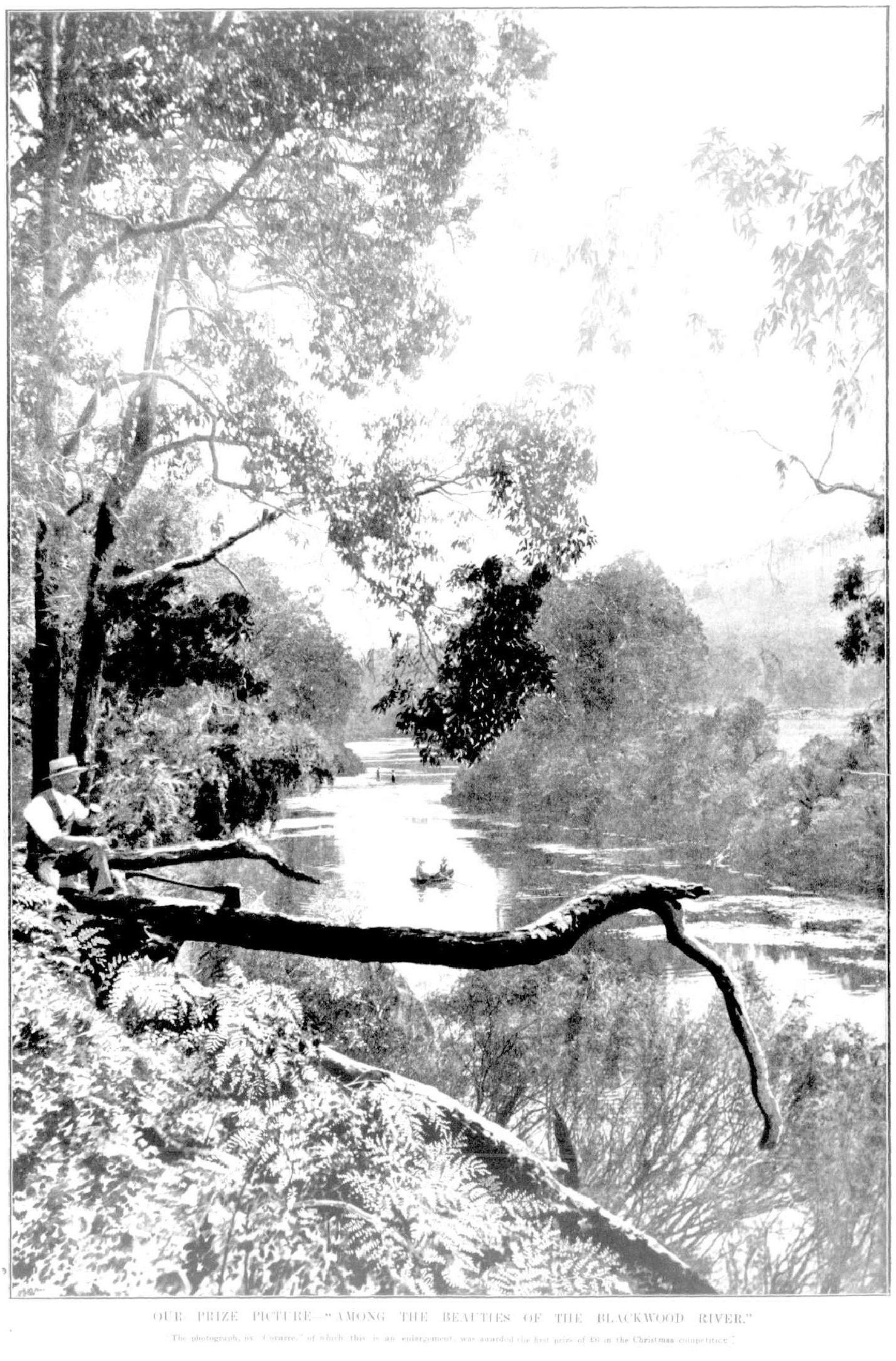
Our prize picture: Among the beauties of the Blackwood River, 1903

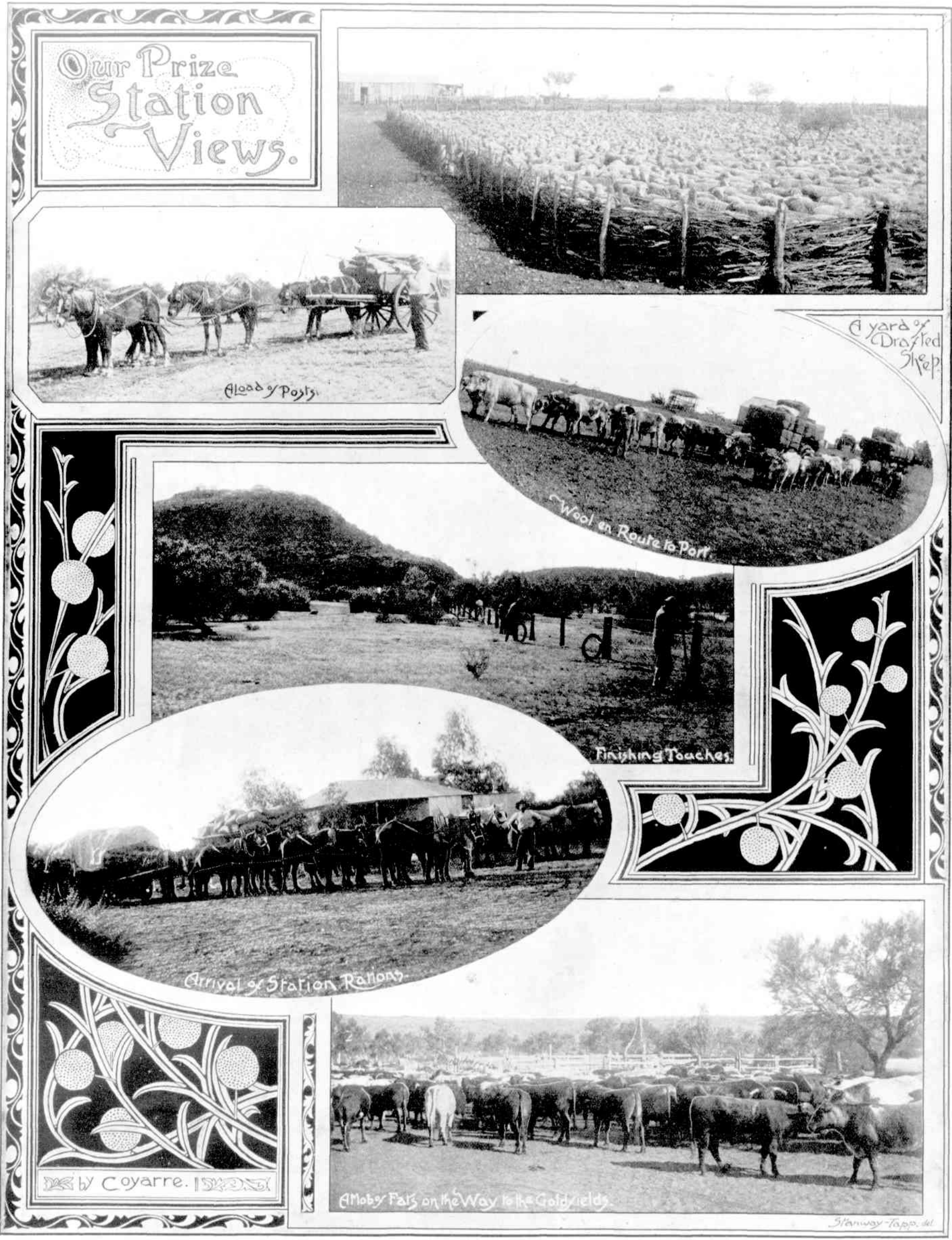
Our Prize Station Views, 1904

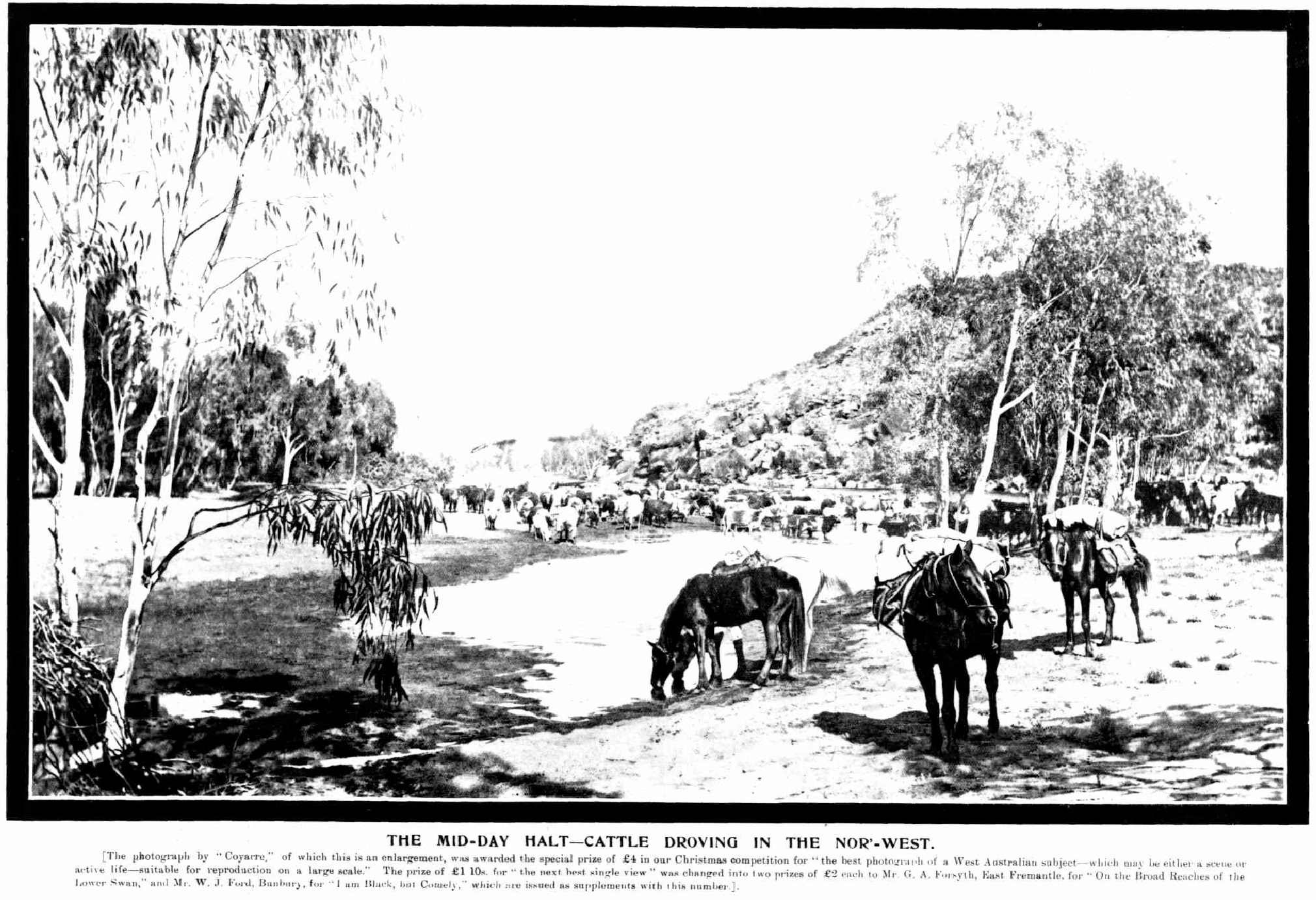
The mid-day halt: Cattle droving in the nor'west, 1905

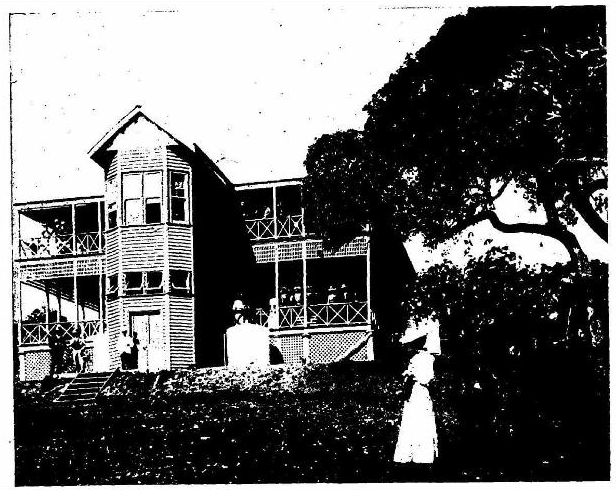
The Caves House, Yallingup, 1904

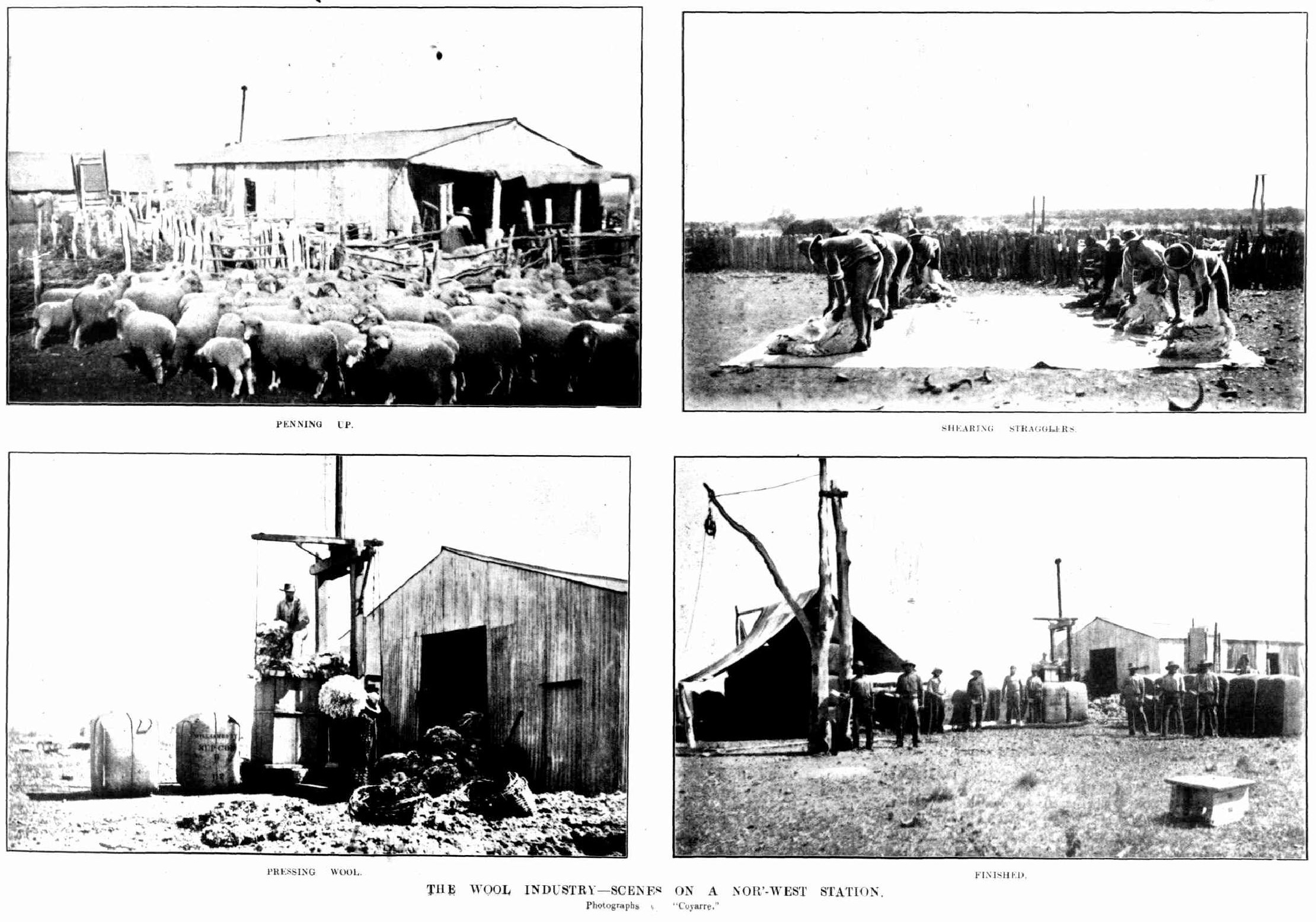
The Wool Industry, 1906
ca. 1903-1906

== Horse breeding and racing ==
Amelia's father and husband were interested in horse breeding, and she herself rode horses until she was 83 years old. Mervyn Bunbury was a successful racehorse owner with The Brewer, that ran in the Ascot Vale Stakes, and the Alma Stakes. Amelia purchased Spinilly After the death of her husband, Amelia raced the sister horses Beaunilly and Beaufiler in the 1930s. Beaunilly who won the Belmont Guineas and Western Australian Derby, while Beaufiler "won races and at the Perth Cup meeting ran second... in the Railway Stakes" and the Karrakatta Plate. She bred Beaufine who won the Railway stakes. Beaunilly foaled Glonilly who won the Intervening Handicap in January 1954, and Beau Vasse who won the Perth cup. Beauambury won the First Maiden Handicap in Perth in 1950.

When her death was announced in 1956, Amelia Bunbury was described as "one of Australia's oldest racehorse owners," and the "'Grandma' of turf."

Photographs of horses associated with the Bunbury family.
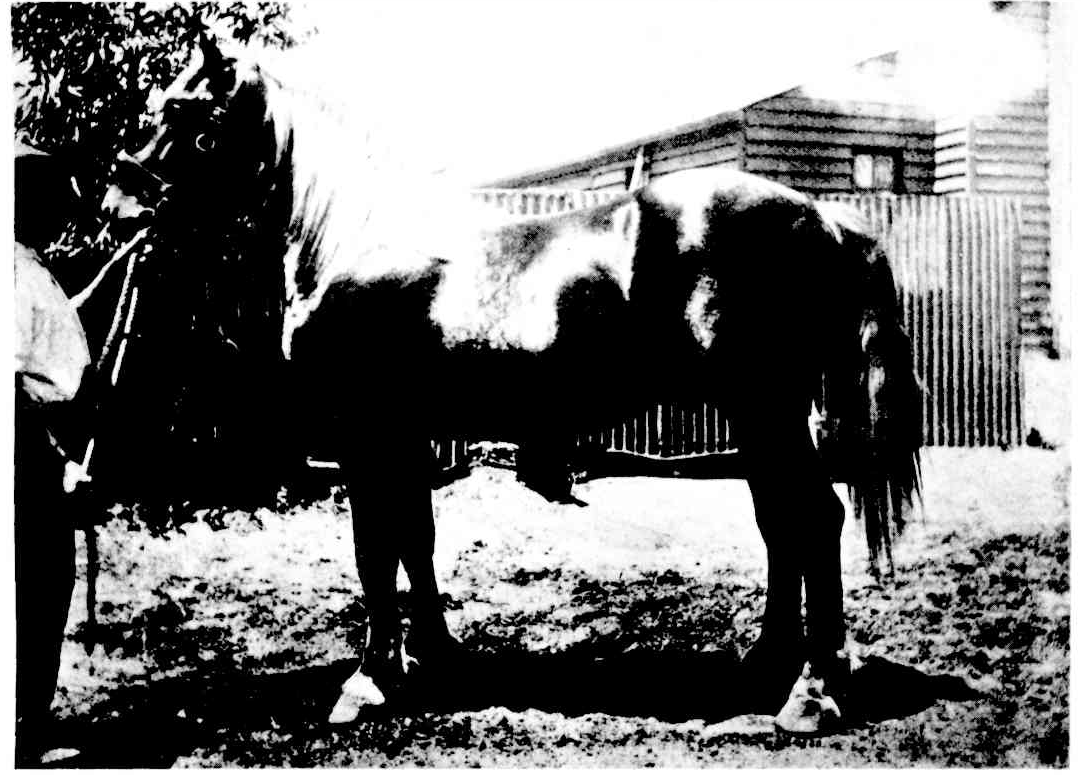
Mr M.C.R. Bunbury's champion Suffolk Punch stallion Ballistite 1905

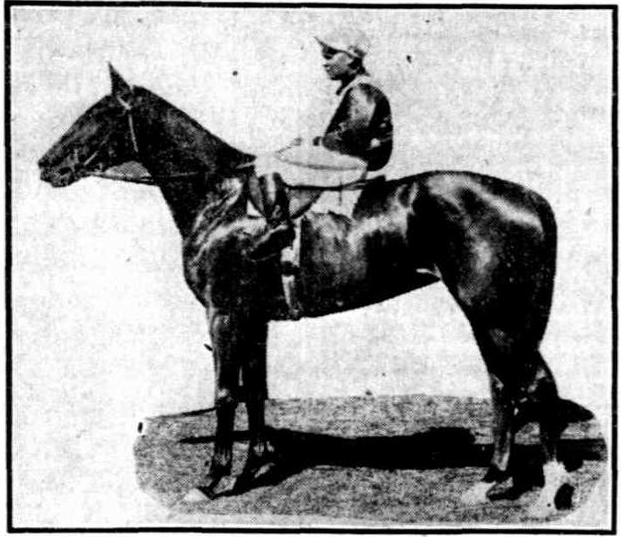
Beaunilly, 1930

== Botanical collecting ==
Amelia's family were keen botanical collectors. Her mother, father, and brothers Arthur Robert Pries (1850-1908) and Edward Adolphus Pries (1852-1916) corresponded with Ferdinand von Mueller and contributed to his botanical collection, that were incorporated into the National Herbarium of Victoria, Royal Botanic Gardens Victoria. Her husband Mervyn may have also collected herbarium specimens for Mueller at Gascoyne River and Shark Bay. She collected specimens at Geographe Bay in 1896, and her specimens are now cared for at herbaria including the National Herbarium of Victoria, the National Herbarium of New South Wales and the Swedish Museum of Natural History.
