= Sires' Produce Stakes (SAJC) =

SA Sires' Produce Stakes (SAJC)
- Class: Group 3
- Location: Morphettville Racecourse, South Australia
- Inaugurated: 1945
- Race type: Thoroughbred
- Sponsor: Sportsbet (2026)

Race information
- Distance: 1,400 metres
- Surface: Turf
- Track: Left-handed
- Qualification: Two-year-olds
- Weight: Set weights colts and geldings – 57 1/2 kg fillies – 55 1/2 kg
- Purse: $150,000 (2026)

The Sires' Produce Stakes is a South Australian Jockey Club Group 3 Thoroughbred horse race for horses aged two years old, at set weights, over a distance of 1400 metres at Morphettville Racecourse, Adelaide, Australia.

== History ==
The inaugural race was won by the filly Norwich, who won her sixth two-year-old race in 1945 in this race at the starting odds of 1/6on.

=== Distance ===
- 1945–1959 - 1 mile (~1600 metres)
- 1960–1965 - 7 furlongs (~1400 metres)
- 1966–1972 - 1 mile (~1600 metres)
- 1973–2009 – 1600 metres
- 2010 onwards - 1400 metres (held on the inner track at Morphettville)

=== Grade ===
- 1945–1978 - Principal Race
- 1979–1991 - Group 2
- 1992 onwards - Group 3

=== 1948 racebook ===
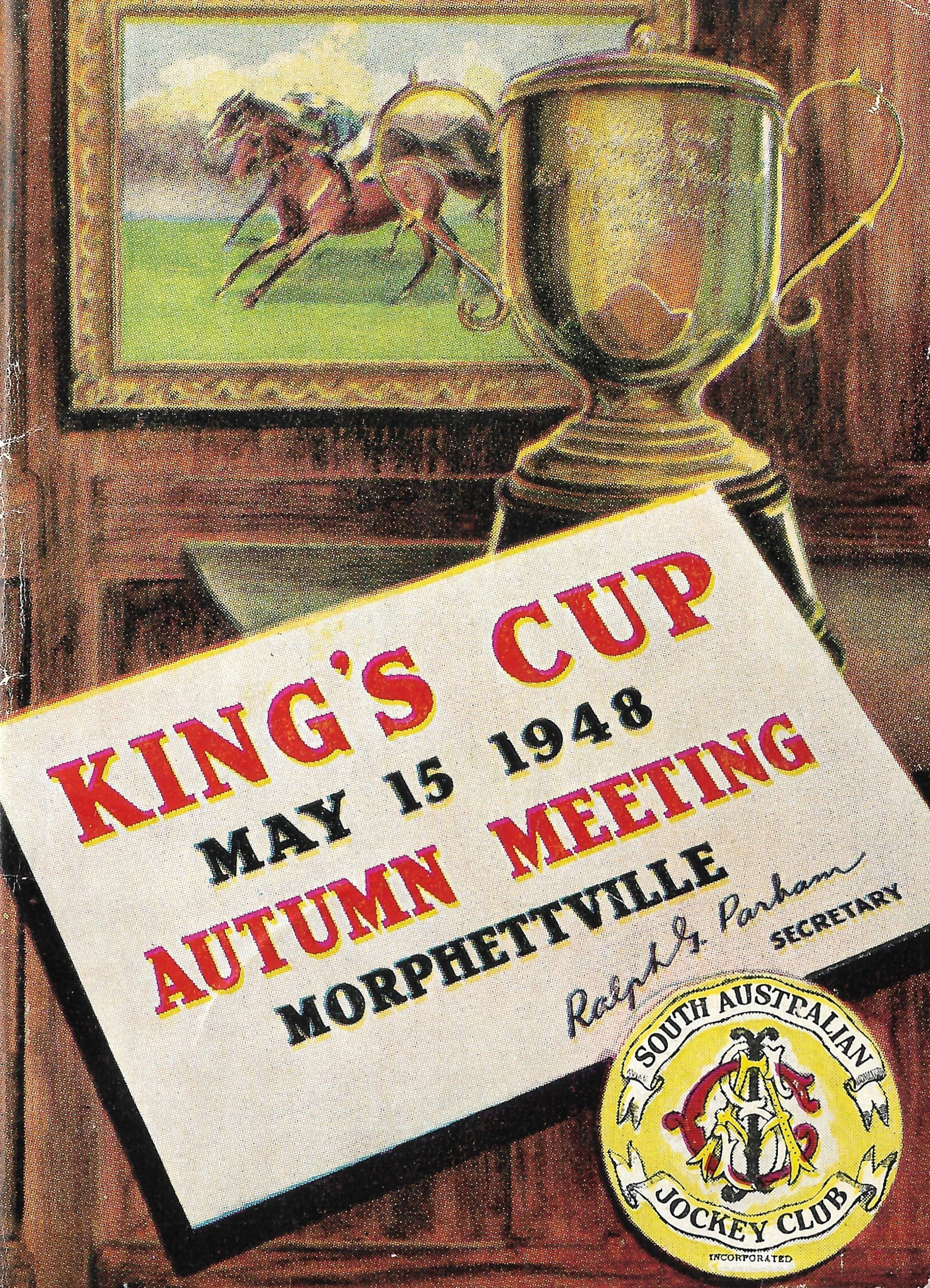
1948 SAJC Kings Cup racebook front cover

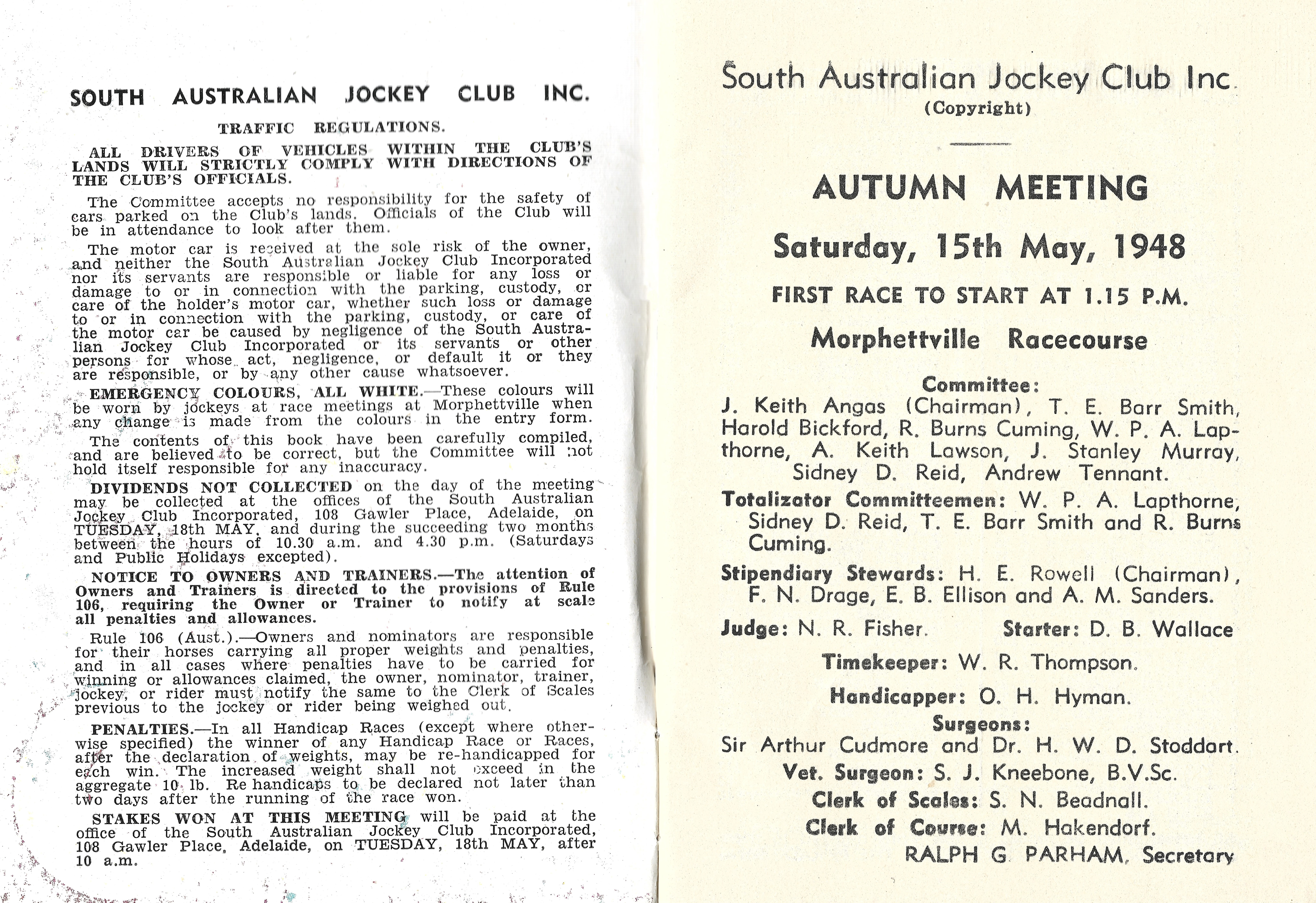
1948 SAJC Kings Cup showing raceday officials

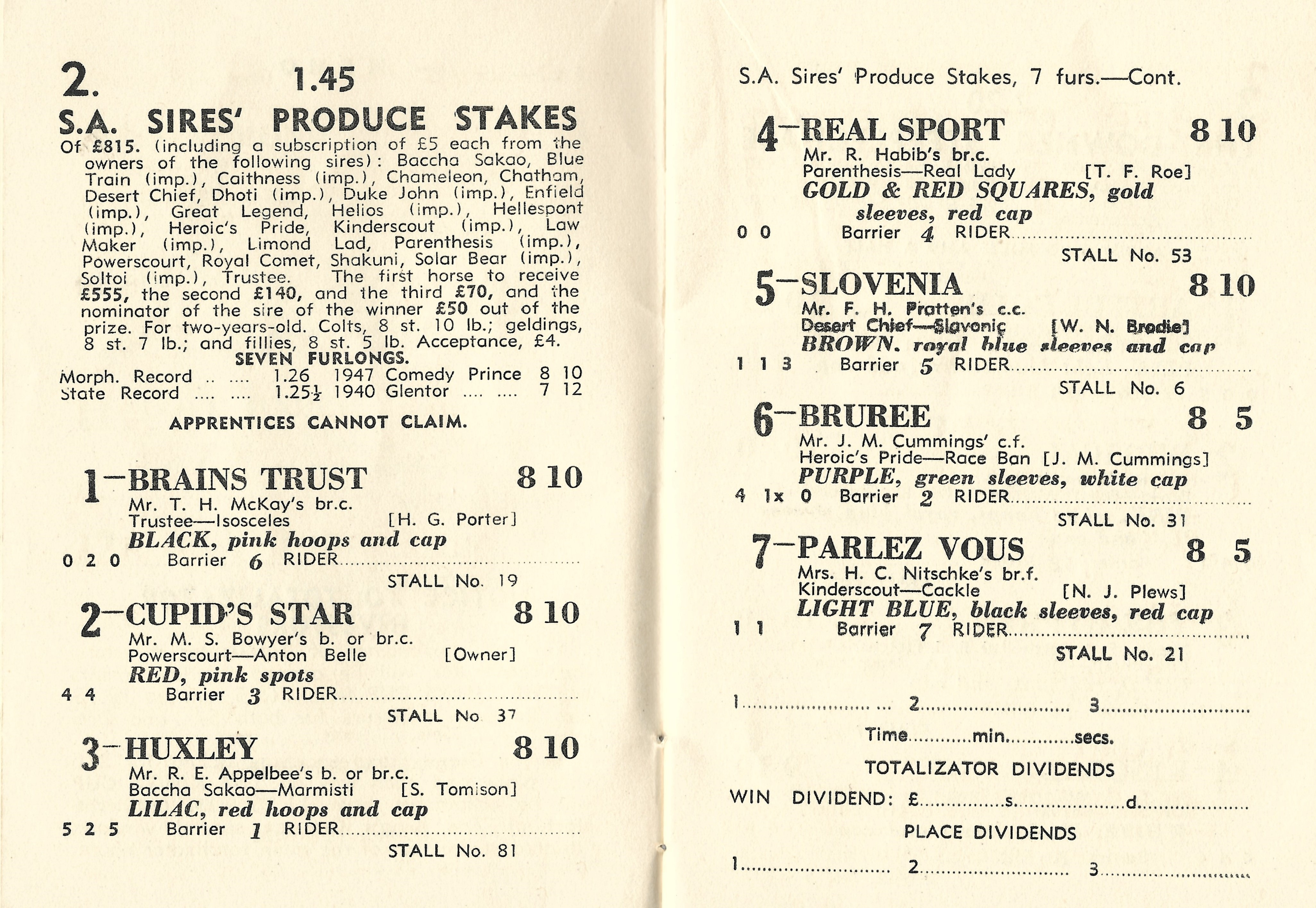
1948 SAJC Sires Produce Stakes page showing the winner, Parlez Vous

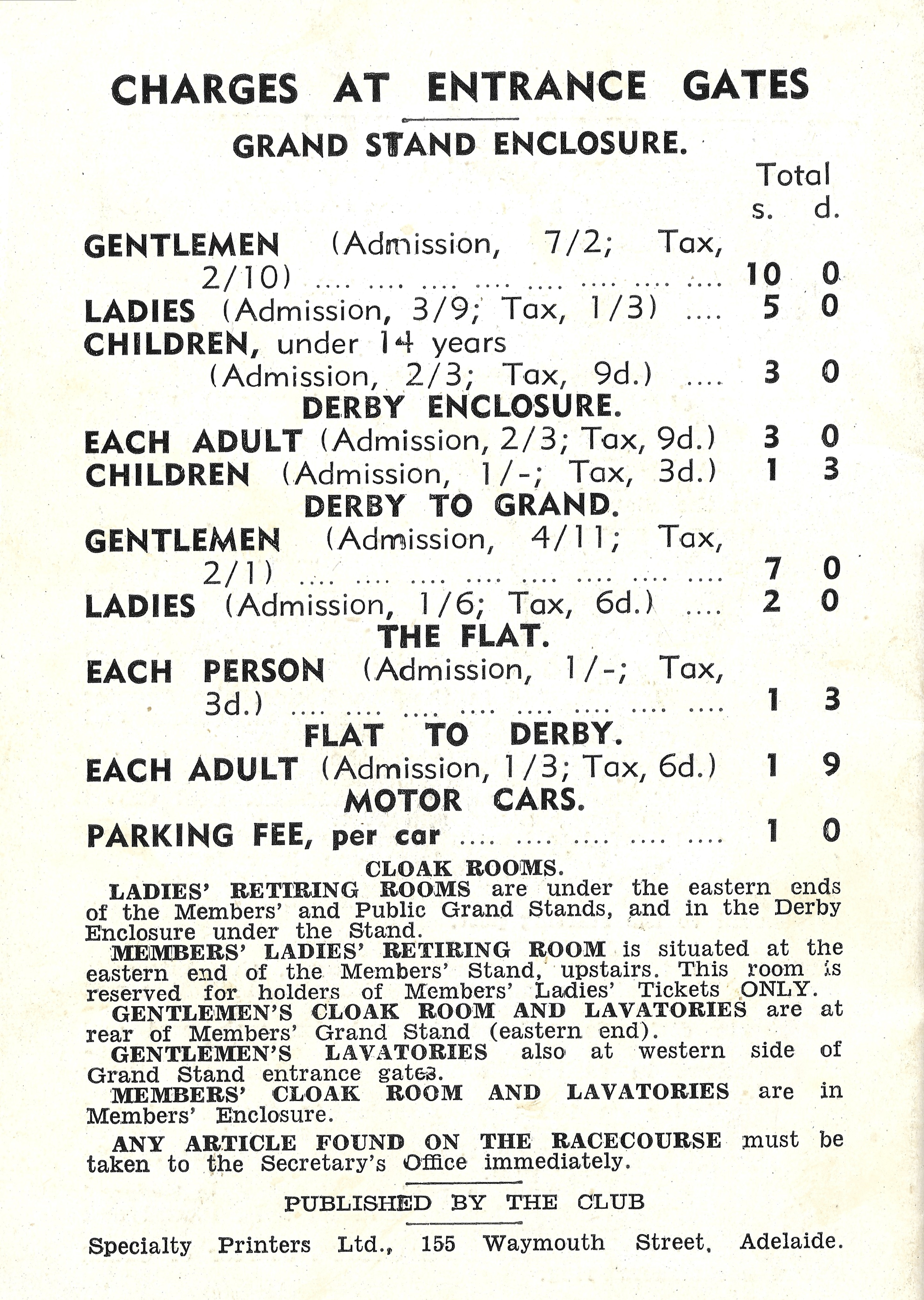
Back cover showing charges at the entrance gates

== Winners ==
The following are past winners of the race.

- 2026 - Neveu
- 2025 - Ethereum Girl
- 2024 - Colmar
- 2023 - Air Assault
- 2022 - Twin Stars
- 2021 - Biscayne Bay
- 2020 - Ringbolt
- 2019 - She Shao Fly
- 2018 - Tequila Time
- 2017 - Time Awaits
- 2016 - Flying Jess
- 2015 - The Grey Flash
- 2014 - Go Indy Go
- 2013 - The Voice
- 2012 - Molto Bene
- 2011 - Cute Emily
- 2010 - Stirling Grove
- 2009 - Silent Surround
- 2008 - Rebel Raider
- 2007 - Bantry Bay
- 2006 - Anamato
- 2005 - Isanami
- 2004 - Calorific
- 2003 - Under The Bridge
- 2002 - Lashed
- 2001 - Li Lo Lill
- 2000 - Ez
- 1999 - Smytzer's Rivalry
- 1998 - Clay Fighter
- 1997 - Umrum
- 1996 - Litmus
- 1995 - Niarchos
- 1994 - Zoffoff
- 1993 - Trivia Lass
- 1992 - Kingston Spirit
- 1991 - Charleston Party
- 1990 - Abandoned War
- 1989 - Interstellar
- 1988 - Almurtajaz
- 1987 - Cindy's Appeal
- 1986 - El Vaquero
- 1985 - Tristabelle
- 1984 - Unique Dancer
- 1983 - Taminor
- 1982 - Aree Lad
- 1981 - Top Of The Ladder
- 1980 - Who Can Say
- 1979 - Tell Fibs
- 1978 - Count Babylon
- 1977 - Kiwi Princess
- 1976 - Sir Sahib
- 1975 - Rondelay
- 1974 - Zasu
- 1973 - Bush Win
- 1972 - Roman Interlude
- 1971 - Odysseus
- 1970 - Eleazar
- 1969 - Cobbermine
- 1968 - Always There
- 1967 - Vitalis
- 1966 - Farmer's Daughter
- 1965 - Far Hills
- 1964 - Yangtze
- 1963 - Sunny Coronation
- 1962 - Proud Miss
- 1961 - Makmore
- 1960 - Beau Sabreur
- 1959 - Royal Artist
- 1958 - Jordan
- 1957 - Cherete
- 1956 - Newstone
- 1955 - Wine Lover
- 1954 - Fair Moon
- 1953 - Introibo
- 1952 - Cellar Master
- 1951 - Beau Cavalier
- 1950 - Miss Damper
- 1949 - Regal Gem
- 1948 - Parlez Vous
- 1947 - Comedy Prince
- 1946 - Conservator
- 1945 - Norwich

== See also ==
- Sires' Produce Stakes (ATC)
- Sires' Produce Stakes (BRC)
- Sires' Produce Stakes (WA)
- Sires' Produce Stakes (VRC)
- List of Australian Group races
- Group races
