= Sires' Produce Stakes (WA) =

Annual horse race in Perth, Western Australia

WA Sires' Produce Stakes
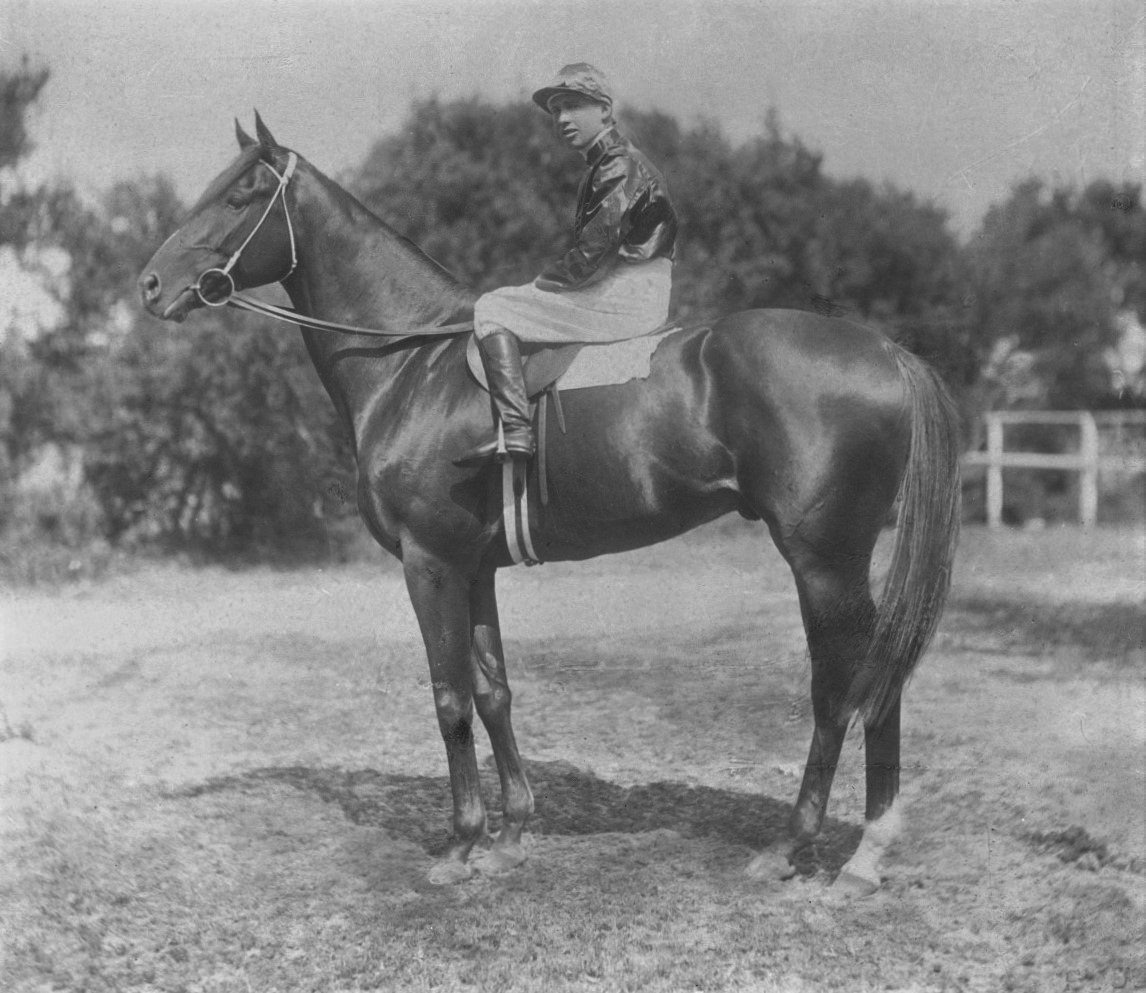
- Eurythmic, 1919 winner
- Class: Group 3
- Location: Ascot Racecourse, Perth, Western Australia
- Inaugurated: 1911
- Race type: Thoroughbred
- Sponsor: Quayclean (2023-25)

Race information
- Distance: 1,400 metres
- Surface: Turf
- Qualification: Two year old
- Weight: Set weights colts and geldings – 56 1/2 kg fillies – 54 1/2 kg
- Purse: $200,000 (2026)

The Sires' Produce Stakes is a Perth Racing Group 3 Thoroughbred horse race for two-year-olds, run at set weights, over a distance of 1400 metres at Ascot Racecourse, Perth, Western Australia in April.

== History ==
=== Grade ===
- 1911–1978 - Principal Race
- 1979–1990 - Group 2
- 1991 onwards - Group 3

=== Other venues ===
- In 2005 and 2010 the race was run at Belmont Park Racecourse.

=== Recent multiple winners ===
Trainers

- Daniel Morton in 2011, 2013, 2023 and 2024
- Fred Kersley in 2006, 2007 and 2017
- Neville Parnham in 2008, 2009 and 2022

Jockeys

- Paul Harvey in 2001, 2002, 2005 and 2009
- Shaun McGruddy in 2006, 2012, 2018 and 2020
- Brad Parnham in 2008, 2022, 2024 and 2025
- Peter Knuckey in 2007, 2016 and 2019
- William Pike in 2011, 2013 and 2026

== Winners ==
The following are past winners of the race.

- 2026 - Beatty
- 2025 - Just Too Fly
- 2024 - Bustling
- 2023 - Super Smink
- 2022 - Snowdome
- 2021 - Hoi An
- 2020 - Watch Me Dance
- 2019 - Tinsnip
- 2018 - Lordhelpmerun
- 2017 - Debellatio
- 2016 - Whispering Brook
- 2015 - Showy Chloe
- 2014 - Prentice
- 2013 - Camporella
- 2012 - Luke's Luck
- 2011 - Bliss Street
- 2010 - Motion Pictures
- 2009 - God Has Spoken
- 2008 - Brava Fortune
- 2007 - Roman Time
- 2006 - Paris Petard
- 2005 - Denmarket
- 2004 - Covertly
- 2003 - Diamond Dash
- 2002 - Hardrada
- 2001 - Miss Vandal
- 2000 - Simon Said
- 1999 - Paradise Park
- 1998 - Bomber Bill
- 1997 - Snooping
- 1996 - Clever Jev
- 1995 - Marooned Lady
- 1994 - Arabella
- 1993 - Starbaleta
- 1992 - Rapid Tripper
- 1991 - Time Frame
- 1990 - Pedantic
- 1989 - Send A Sign
- 1988 - Deluxe Model
- 1987 - Showy Gift
- 1986 - Sanhedrin's Pride
- 1985 - Just Begun
- 1984 - Don Remon
- 1983 - Shah-Anne
- 1982 - Corona Miss
- 1981 - Wild Side
- 1980 - Papermaker
- 1979 - Hakim Boy
- 1978 - Rare Sovereign
- 1977 - Rolera
- 1976 - Storm Star
- 1975 - Farranfore
- 1974 - Dawn Aptly
- 1973 - Our Pocket
- 1972 - Indian Law
- 1971 - Indian Shel
- 1970 - Red Crescent
- 1969 - Roman Hills
- 1968 - Hispano
- 1967 - Super Sam
- 1966 - Haze
- 1965 - Nanna Tale
- 1964 - Little Roderick
- 1963 - Son O' Minx
- 1962 - Nicopolis
- 1961 - Geike
- 1960 - Chestillion
- 1959 - Kuantan
- 1958 - Countess Blanche
- 1957 - Sanvista
- 1956 - Fairflow
- 1955 - Aldon Queen
- 1954 - Maniana
- 1953 - Queen Mark
- 1952 - Winker
- 1951 - Master Gordon
- 1950 - Beau Scot
- 1949 - Radiant Stream
- 1948 - Precedent
- 1947 - Westralian
- 1946 - Blue Stream
- 1945 - Flaming Monarch
- 1944 - New Hue
- 1943 - Kalamunda
- 1942 - Skyro
- 1941 - Ruby
- 1940 - Knight Brook
- 1939 - Loyalist
- 1938 - Gay Prince
- 1937 - Jungle Lady
- 1936 - Jongleur
- 1935 - First Consul
- 1934 - Hyperion
- 1933 - D'Artagnan
- 1932 - Riveret
- 1931 - Jolly Fair
- 1930 - Shining Colours
- 1929 - Lord Beggar
- 1928 - Dawn Of Youth
- 1927 - Ferric
- 1926 - Maple
- 1925 - Pica Pica
- 1924 - Neatfoot
- 1923 - Flimsy
- 1922 - Landon
- 1921 - Poondarra
- 1920 - Jolly Cosy
- 1919 - Eurythmic
- 1918 - Eudios
- 1917 - Ventrim
- 1916 - Yandil
- 1915 - Welkin Queen
- 1914 - Irish Knight
- 1913 - Pilbarra
- 1912 - Roserial
- 1911 - Florabel

== See also ==
- Karrakatta Plate
- Sires' Produce Stakes (ATC)
- Sires' Produce Stakes (BRC)
- Sires' Produce Stakes (SAJC)
- Sires' Produce Stakes (VRC)
- List of Australian Group races
- Group races
