= Eurythmic (horse) =

Australian-bred Thoroughbred racehorse

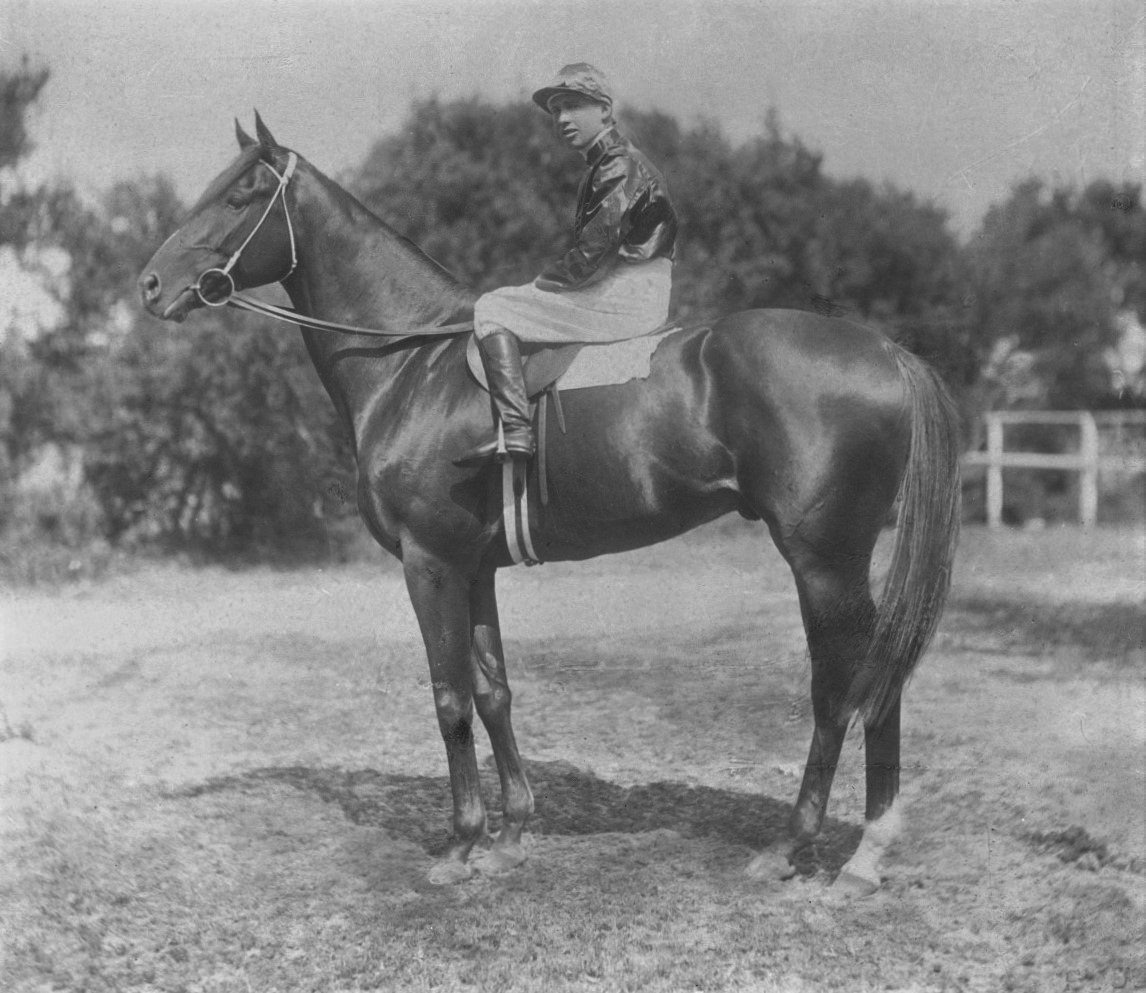
- Eurythmic & Frank Dempsey
- Sire: Eudoris (GB)
- Grandsire: Forfarshire
- Dam: Bob Cherry (1910)
- Damsire: Bobadil
- Sex: Stallion
- Foaled: 1916
- Died: 1925
- Country: Australia
- Colour: Chestnut
- Breeder: Noel Thompson
- Owner: Ernest Lee Steere (later Sir)
- Trainer: 1. John Kelly; 2. Jack Holt
- Record: 47:31.6.4
- Earnings: £36,891

Major wins
- Karrakatta Plate (1918); Sires' Produce Stakes (WA) (1919); WATC Derby (1919); Perth Cup (d.h.) (1919); CB Cox Stakes (1920); Caulfield Cup (1920); Melbourne Stakes (1920 & 1921); Memsie Stakes (1920, 1921, 1922); Caulfield Stakes (1920, 1921, 1922); C.B.Fisher Plate (1920); Sydney Cup (1921); AJC Autumn Stakes (1921); Herbert Power Stakes (1921); AJC Cumberland Stakes (1921); Futurity Stakes (1922); St George Stakes (1922)

Honours
- Australian Racing Hall of Fame; Eurythmic Stakes; WATC Eurythmic Cup
- Last updated on 8 June 2010

Eurythmic (1916–1925) was a versatile Australian-bred Thoroughbred racehorse who had the ability to produce a brilliant finishing run in staying races and he also won important sprint races, too. At four he won 12 of his 13 starts including the Caulfield Cup and Sydney Cup. When Eurythmic finished racing he was the greatest stake-winner in Australia. He was later inducted into the Australian Racing Hall of Fame.

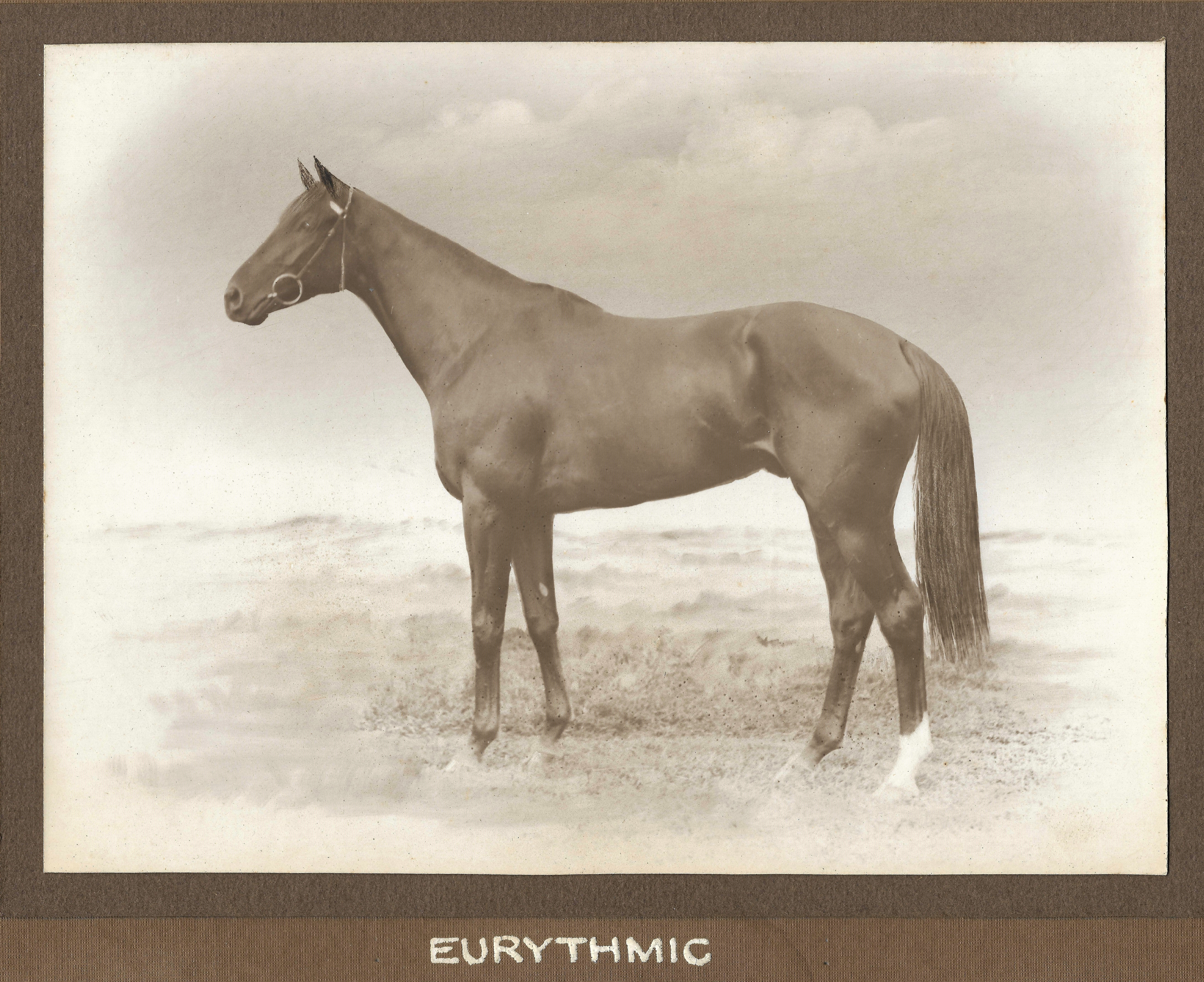
Eurythmic

== Breeding ==
He was bred by the young breeder, Noel Thompson at the Yarraman Stud, west of Scone, New South Wales. Eurythmic was by the good racehorse, Eudoris (GB), (won VATC Futurity Stakes and VRC All-Aged Stakes and sired 10 stakes-winners, which had 47 stakes-wins), his dam was the good racemare and useful broodmare, Bob Cherry by the good sire, Bobadil (won 12 stakes-races and was the sire of 39 stakeswinners with 69 stakeswins) from Ardea by Wallace (by Carbine). He was inbred to St Simon in the fourth generation of his pedigree (4m x 4f).

Eurythmic was offered at the 1918 Sydney yearling sales and sold to E. Lee Steere (later Sir Ernest Lee Steere) of Perth. He was then taken to Western Australia and trained by John Kelly for his two- and three-year-old racing in that state.

== 1922 racebook ==
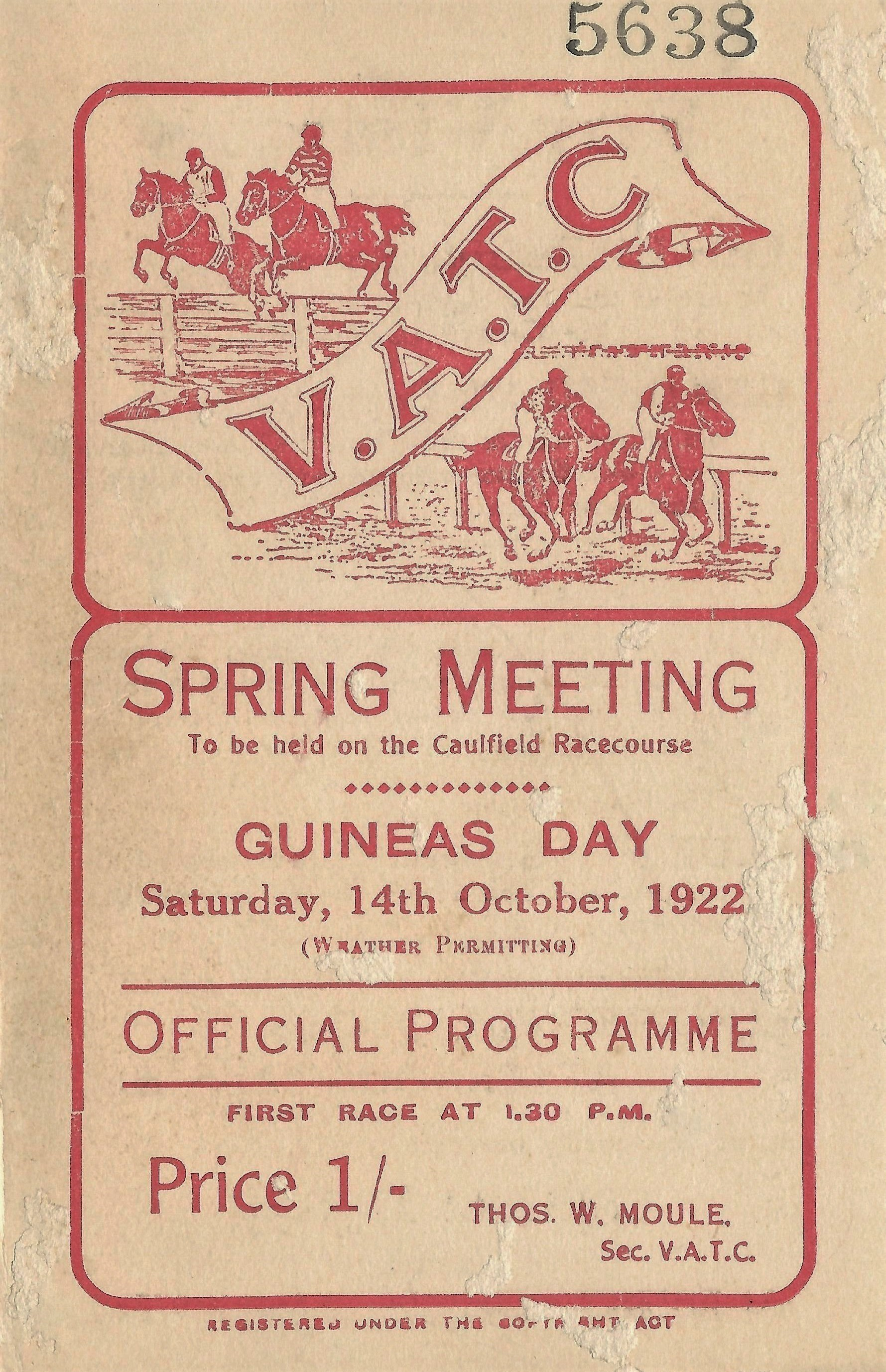
Front cover 1922 VATC Caulfield Stakes racebook

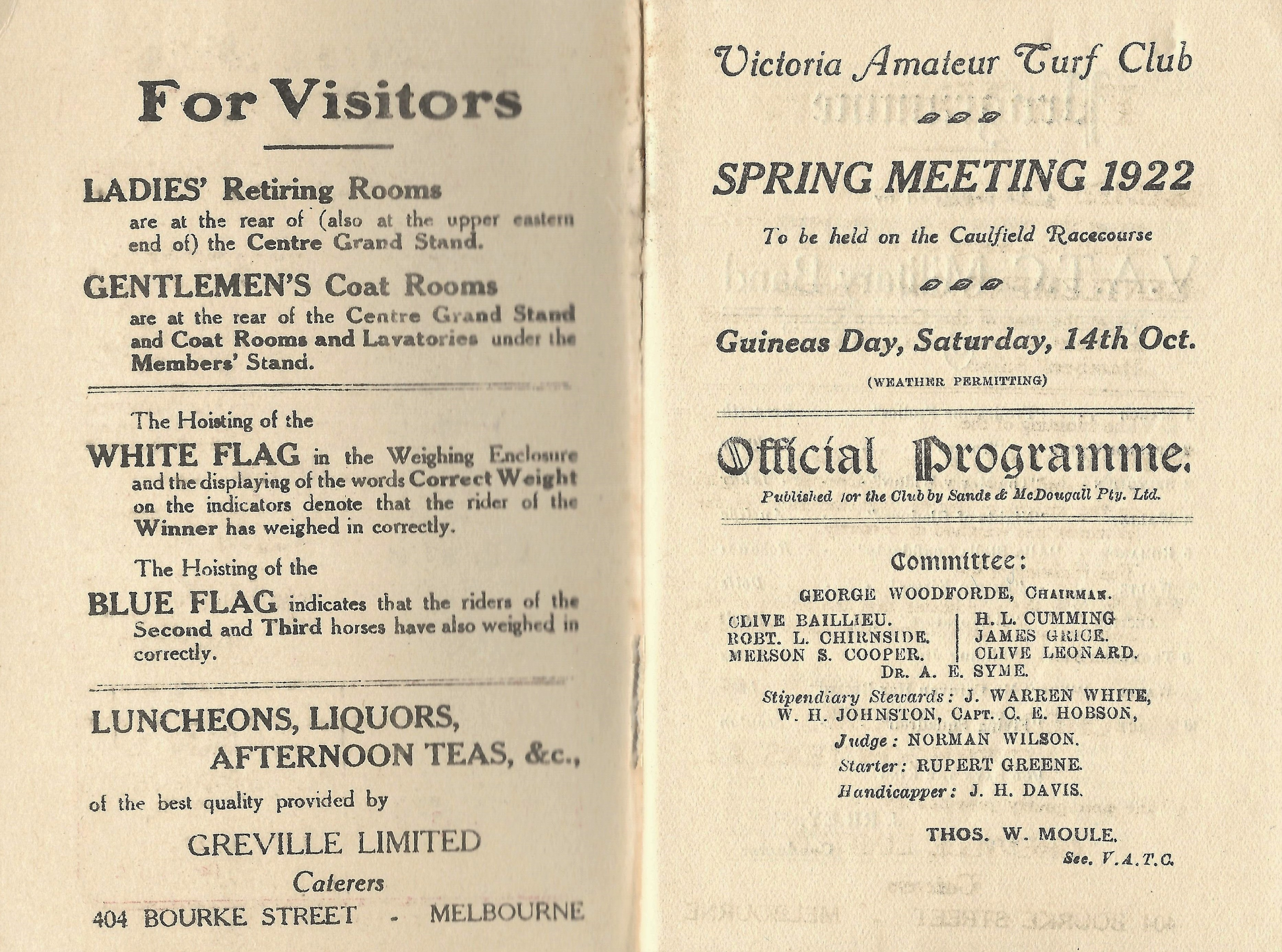
Inside cover showing raceday officials & visitor notices

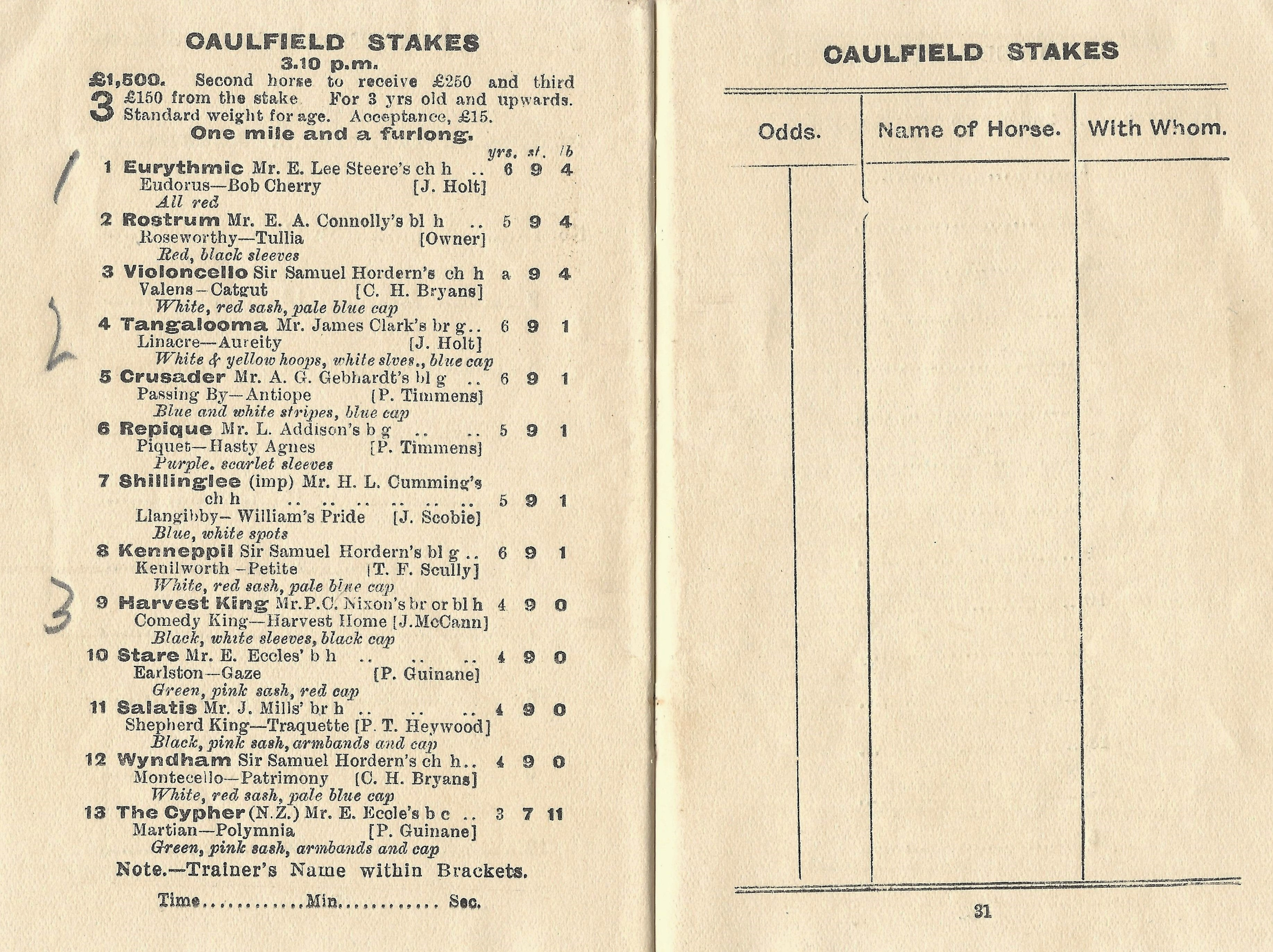
1922 VATC Caulfield Stakes showing the winner, Eurythmic

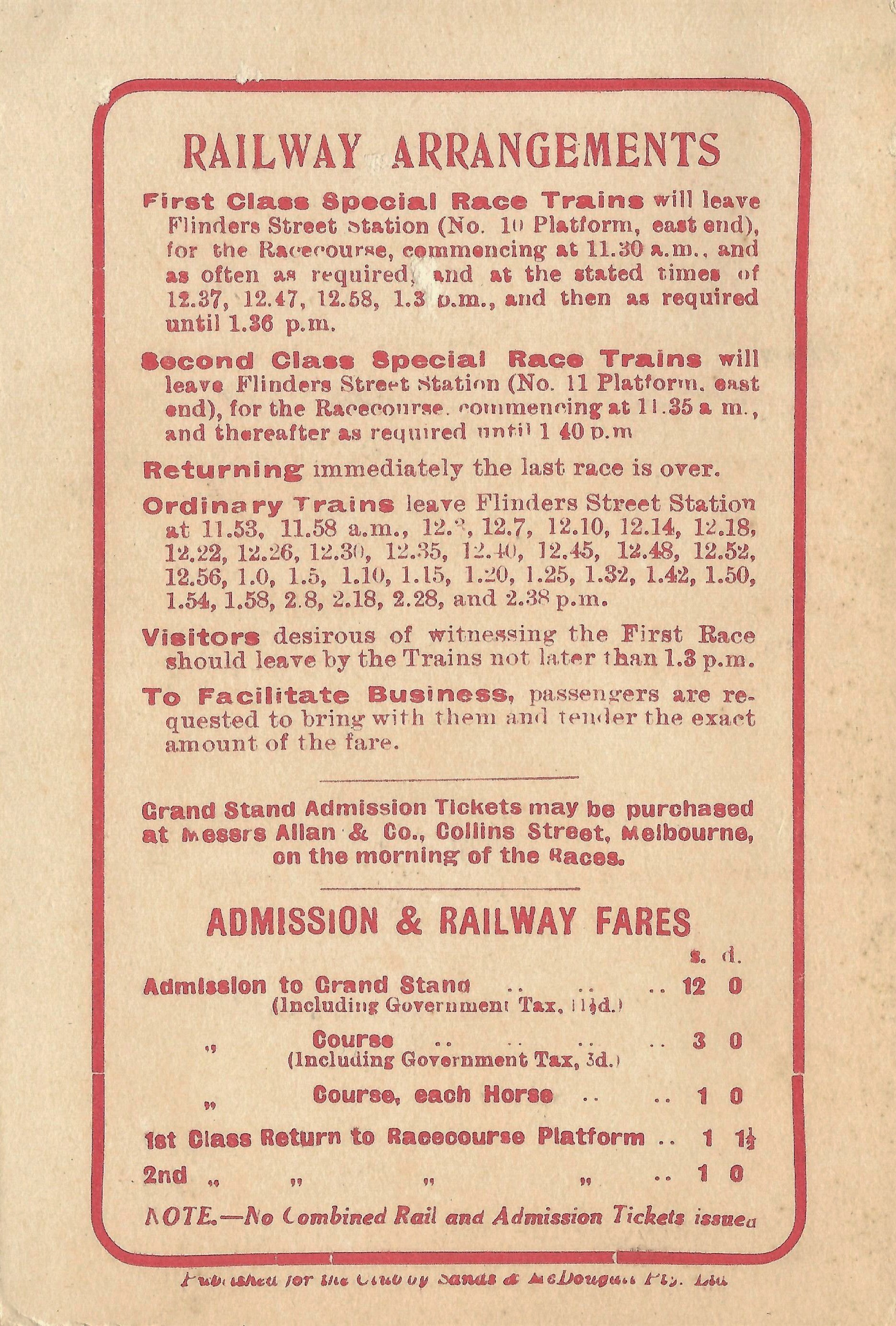
Back cover showing railway arrangements and admission fares

== Racing record ==
=== Two-year-old: 1918-1919 ===
His first start was in the WATC Initial Stakes, but he was unplaced to the two-year-old Eragoon, to whom he finished third at his next start. At their next meeting in the WATC Nursery Handicap Eurythmic was in receipt of two stone in weight and defeated his former victor by five lengths. This pair met again in the Karrakatta Plate over five furlongs, at equal weights, and Eurythmic won by 1½ lengths. Eurythmic was then unplaced in the Claremont Handicap and concluded his first season of racing by winning the WATC Sires Produce Stakes by 3½ lengths.

=== Three-year-old: 1919-1920 ===
Eurythmic won seven of his eight starts as a three-year-old, including the WATC Grove Handicap from a big field, the WATC Derby, and three days later dead-heated with the outsider Rivose (conceding her 10 pounds) in the Perth Cup. The pair covered the distance in 3:25 which was then a record for the 2 miles (3,200 metres). He then won the weight for age (wfa) C B Cox Stakes, WATC Osborne Stakes (the latter in course record time) and then finished the season with a win in the WATC St Leger. He had finished his three-year-old season as the undisputed champion of Western Australia.

=== Four-year-old: 1920-1921 ===
He was taken east at the beginning of his four-year-old career to be trained by Jack Holt in Melbourne. Eurythmic won the VATC Memsie Stakes, starting at 20 to 1, and was then installed as favourite for the VRC October Stakes, in which he beat Ethiopian (GB) by 1¼ lengths. During October he won the Caulfield Stakes, the Caulfield Cup (defeating a big field and giving each of the place-getters a stone in weight), and the Melbourne Stakes which was his eleventh consecutive victory. The following week he suffered his only defeat for the season, running fourth to Poitrel in the Melbourne Cup. Eurythmic won his next eight races: the CB Fisher Plate (defeating Poitrel), Essendon Stakes, VRC Governor's Plate and King's Plate, AJC Autumn Stakes, Sydney Cup (carrying 9 stone 8 pounds (61 kg)) and the Cumberland Stakes. He finished the season with a tally of 12 wins from 13 starts.

=== Five-year-old: 1921-1922 ===
Eurythmic won his first five-year-old race, the Memsie Stakes, a race which he would win for three consecutive years. In the October Stakes Tangalooma defeated Eurythmic by a short half-head. Next Eurythmic won the Caulfield Stakes (in race record time), Herbert Power Stakes and the VRC Melbourne Stakes. In the Melbourne Cup he suffered interference and was pulled up. In the VATC St George Stakes he conceded the second place-getter, Harvest King, more than 2 stone, and was penalised 20-pounds for his win when the weights were issued for the VATC Futurity Stakes, which he duly won carrying 10 stone 7 pounds (67 kg). Eurythmic's prize money for this race led to him overtaking Carbine as the greatest Australian stake winner to that time. He was unplaced in the Newmarket Handicap field, won the C. M. Lloyd Stakes at (wfa), and ran third in the (wfa) AJC Autumn Stakes (to Beauford and Sister Olive) and in the (wfa) Cumberland Stakes, (to David and Furious).

=== Six-year-old: 1922-1923 ===
In his last season of racing Eurythmic won both the Memsie Stakes and Caulfield Stakes for the third year in succession, ran second in the Herbert Power Stakes, and third in the Melbourne Stakes. In his final four starts he finished second in the VATC St George Stakes, VATC Futurity Stakes (carrying 10 st 7 lb (67 kg)), VRC Essendon Stakes, and C. M. Lloyd Stakes. By the time he had finished racing as a six-year-old he was one of the greatest stake-winners in Australia, with winnings of more than £36,000.

== Stud record ==
Eurythmic stood his first season in Victoria and was then relocated to Western Australia. He died there before the end of the spring in 1925, after spending less than two full seasons at stud. It was discovered that he had an enlarged heart which was attributed to heart strain caused from exertion during his racing. His skeleton was mounted and displayed in the Western Australian Museum.

Eurythmic was an indifferent sire that failed to produce any winners of principal races. Two of his daughters were successful broodmares though:

- Eumilia, 1924, by (alternative sire Comedy King) or Eurythmic was the dam of two stakes-winners, King's Knave and Tapestry
- Soaring, 1924, was the dam of Ethyia (dam of The Orb won VATC Futurity Stakes) and The Darter (third dam of Sharply (won Sydney Cup, Ipswich Cup, Chelmsford Stakes etc.))

== Honours ==
Eurythmic was inducted into the Australian Racing Hall of Fame in 2005. He was also inducted into the West Australian Racing Industry Hall of Fame. In 2022, the Group 3 Northerly Stakes in Perth was renamed the Eurythmic Stakes in his honour.

== See also ==
- List of leading Thoroughbred racehorses
- Repeat winners of horse races
