= Sires' Produce Stakes (VRC) =

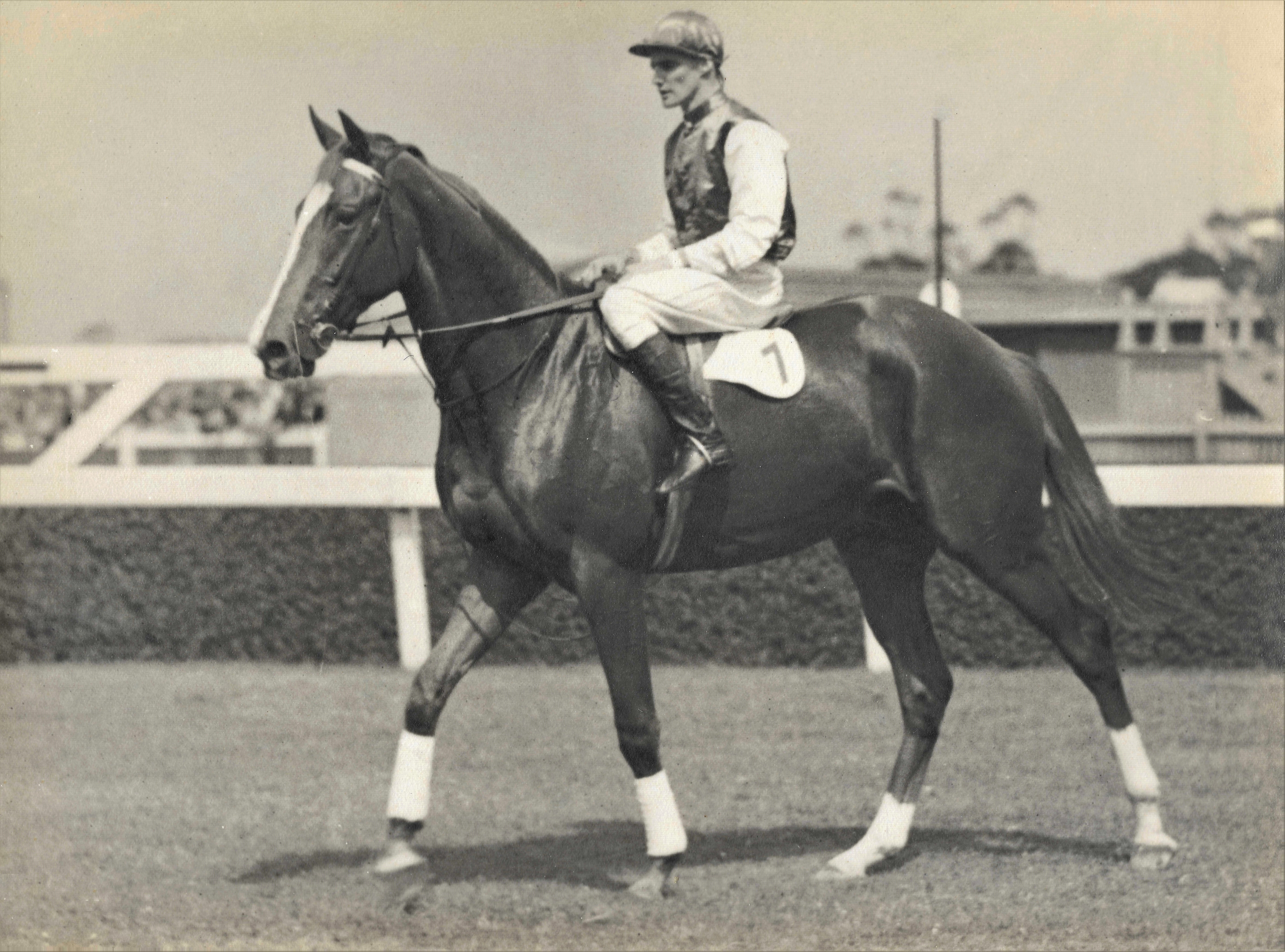
- Gold Rod, 1936 winner Jack Pratt
- Class: Group 2
- Location: Flemington Racecourse
- Inaugurated: 1862
- Race type: Thoroughbred
- Sponsor: Darley (2026)

Race information
- Distance: 1,400 metres
- Surface: Turf
- Qualification: Two year old
- Weight: Set weights colts and geldings – 57 kg fillies – 55 kg
- Purse: $300,000 (2026)

The Sires' Produce Stakes is a Victoria Racing Club Group 2 Thoroughbred horse race for two-year-olds, run at set weights, over a distance of 1400 metres, at Flemington Racecourse, Melbourne, Australia in March during the VRC Autumn Racing Carnival.

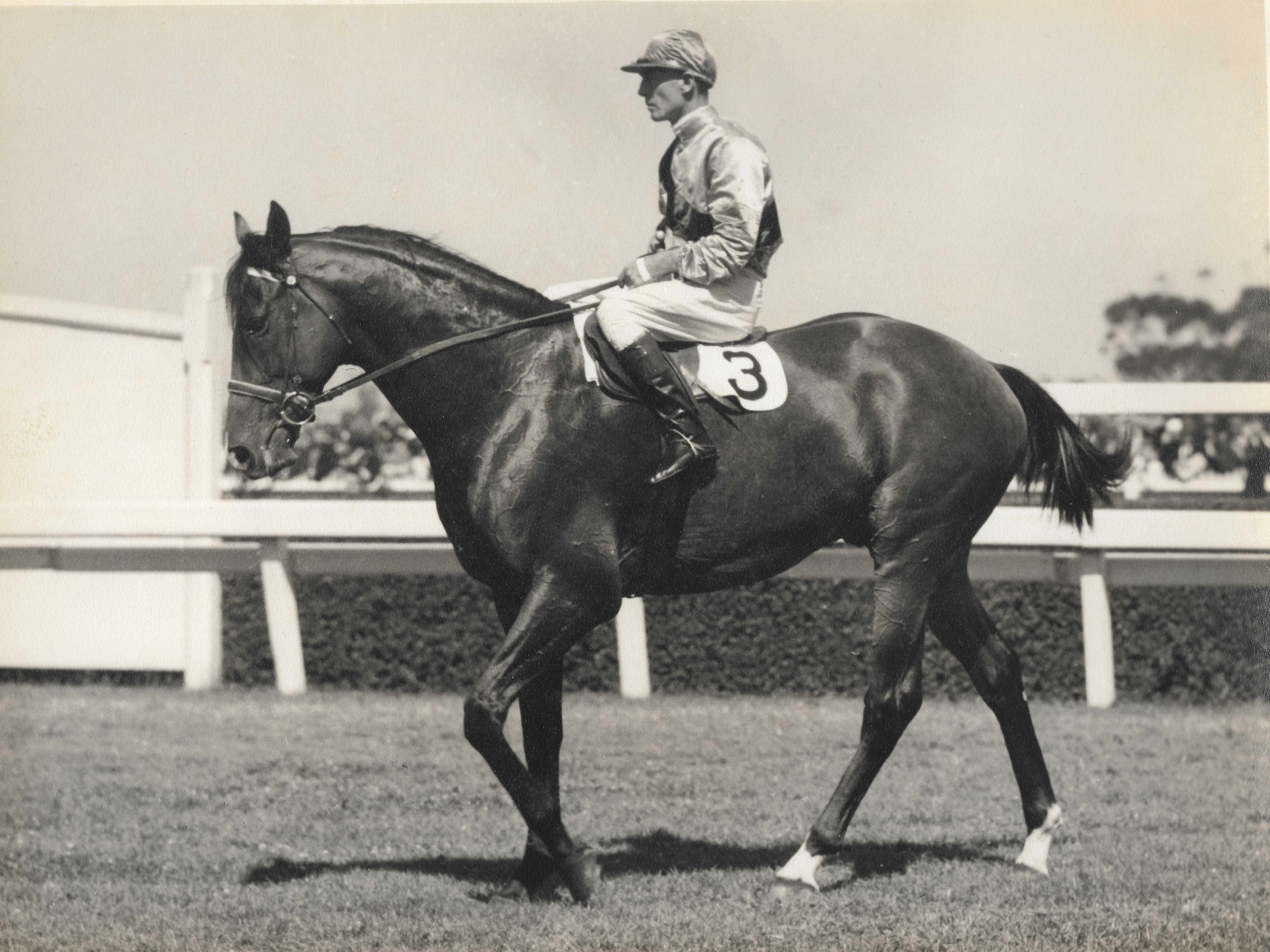
High Caste, 1939 winner

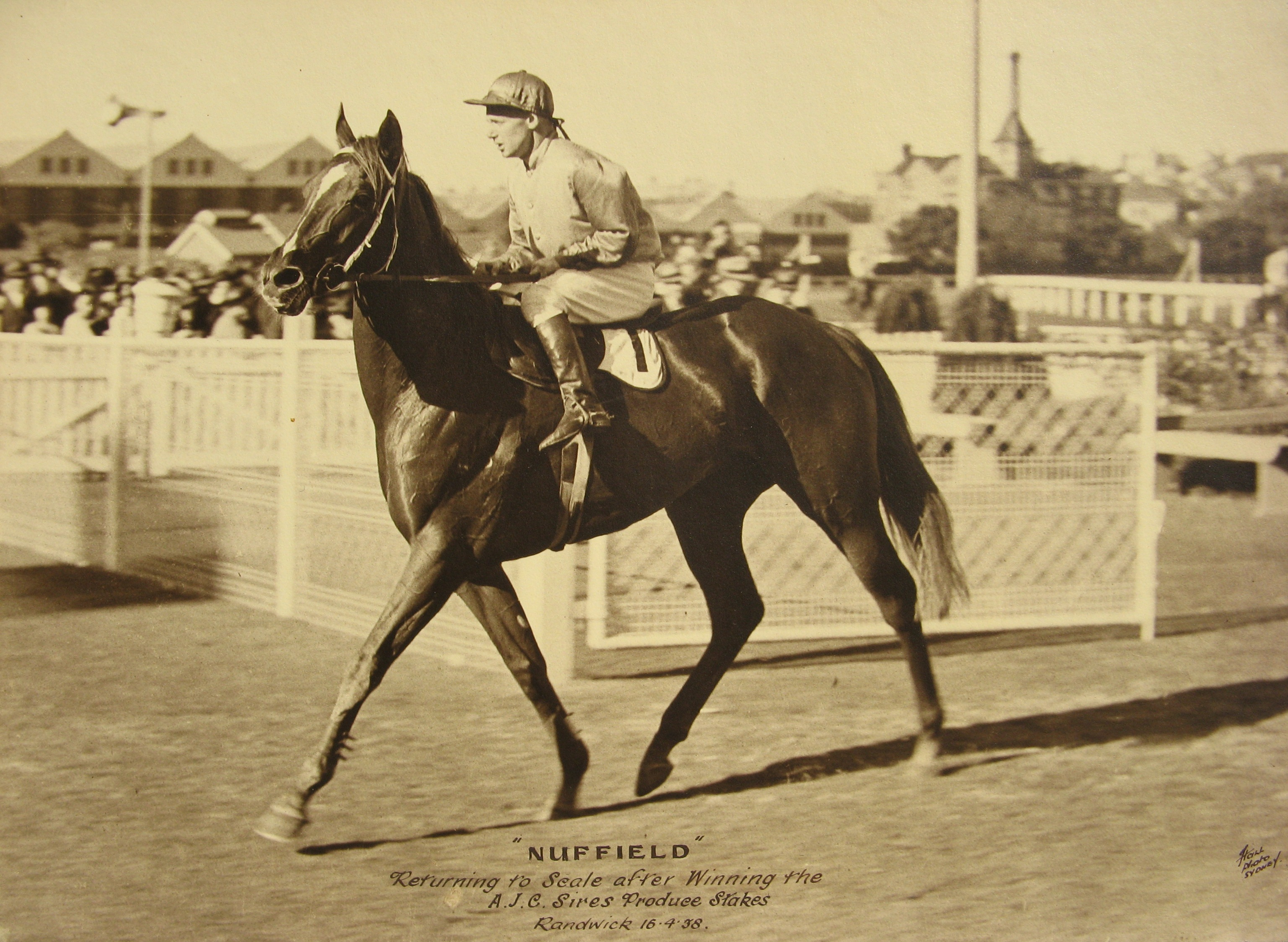
Nuffield, 1938 winner

== History ==
The race has had several changes in grade, name and in distance.

Among the past winners of this race are two of the very best performers in the history of the Australian turf in Tulloch in 1957 and Vain in 1969.

Mark Zahra was the winning jockey in 2016, 2018 and 2025.

=== 1954 racebook ===
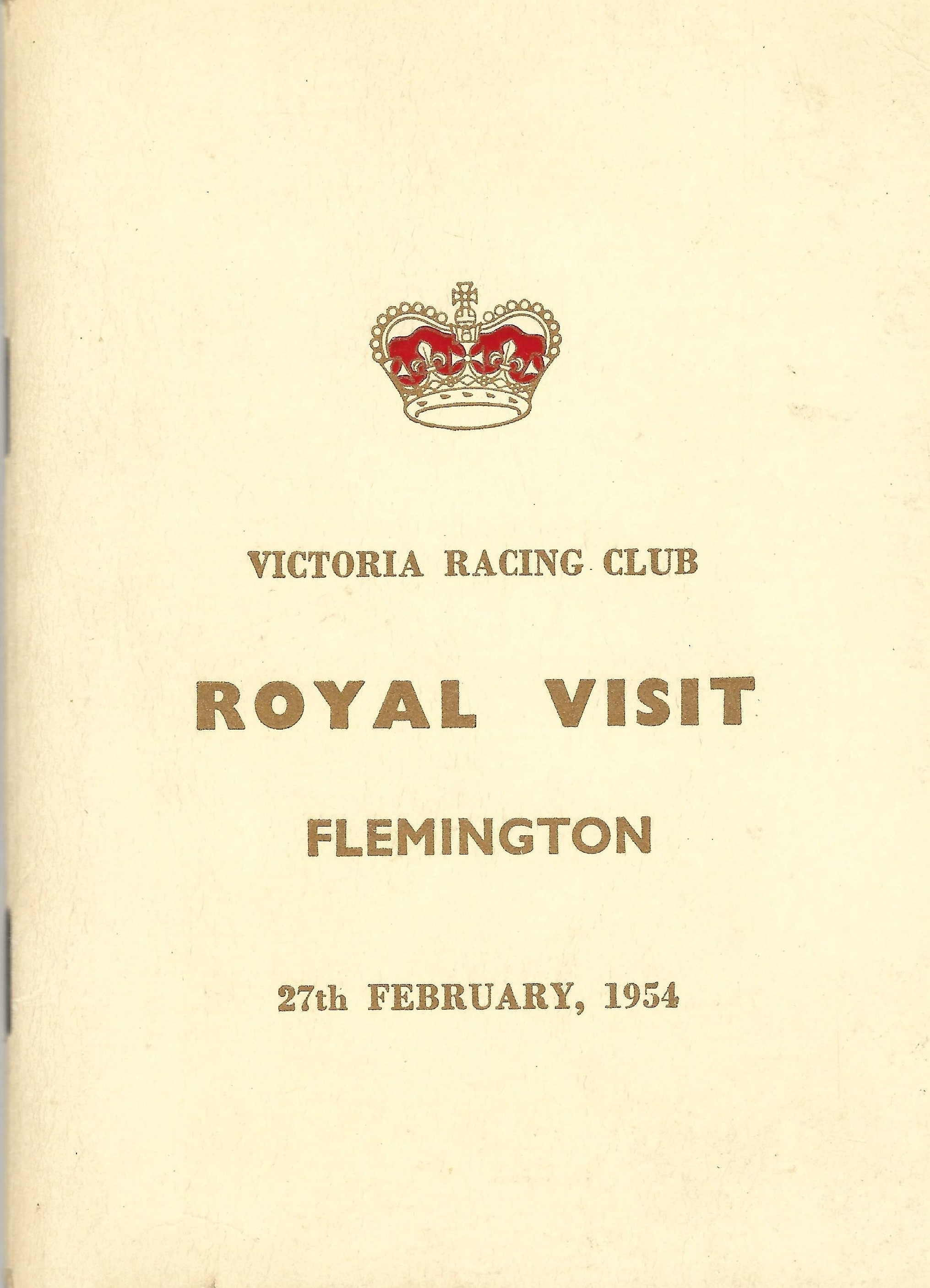
1954 VRC Australian Cup racebook front cover

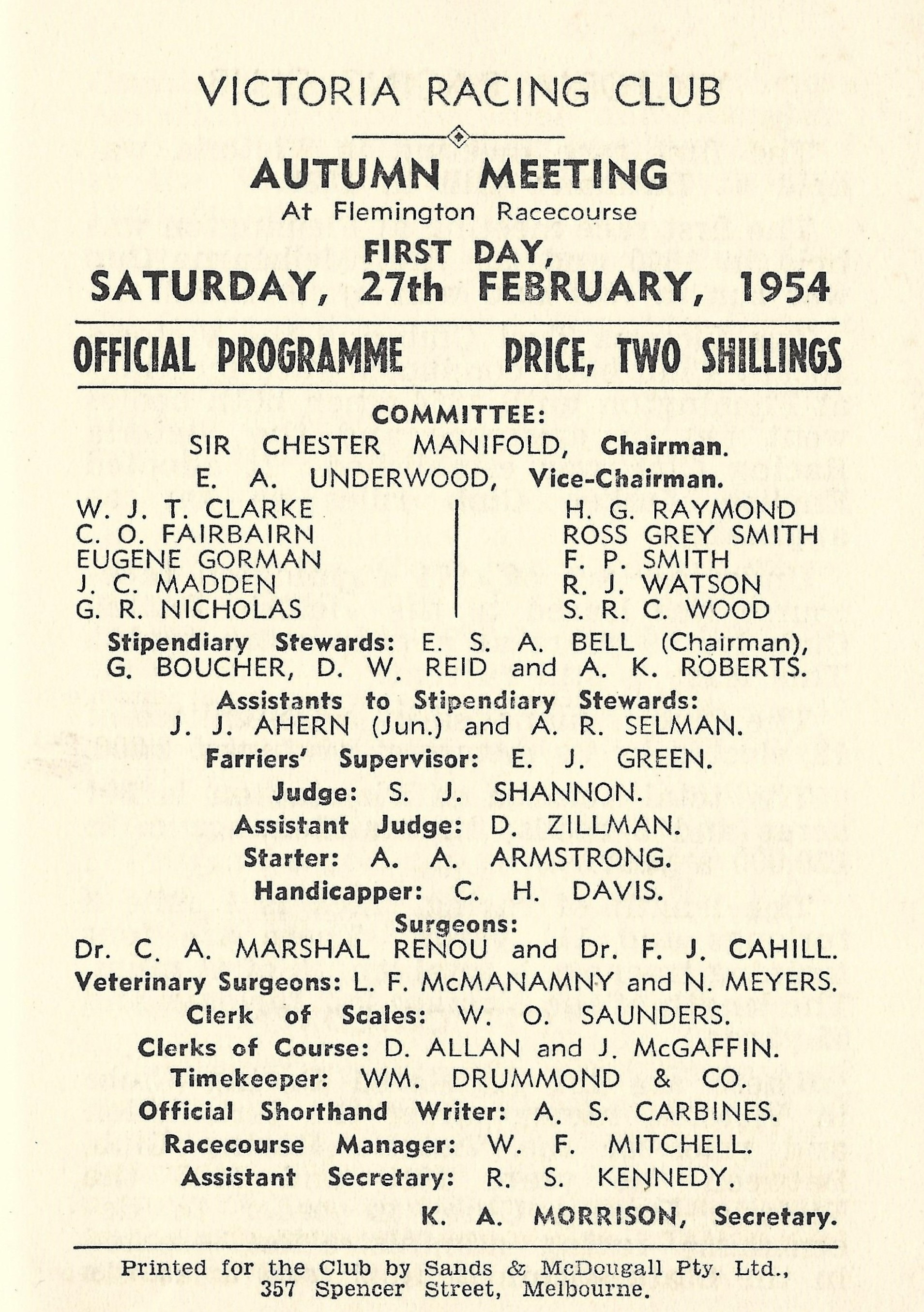
1954 VRC Australian Cup raceday officials

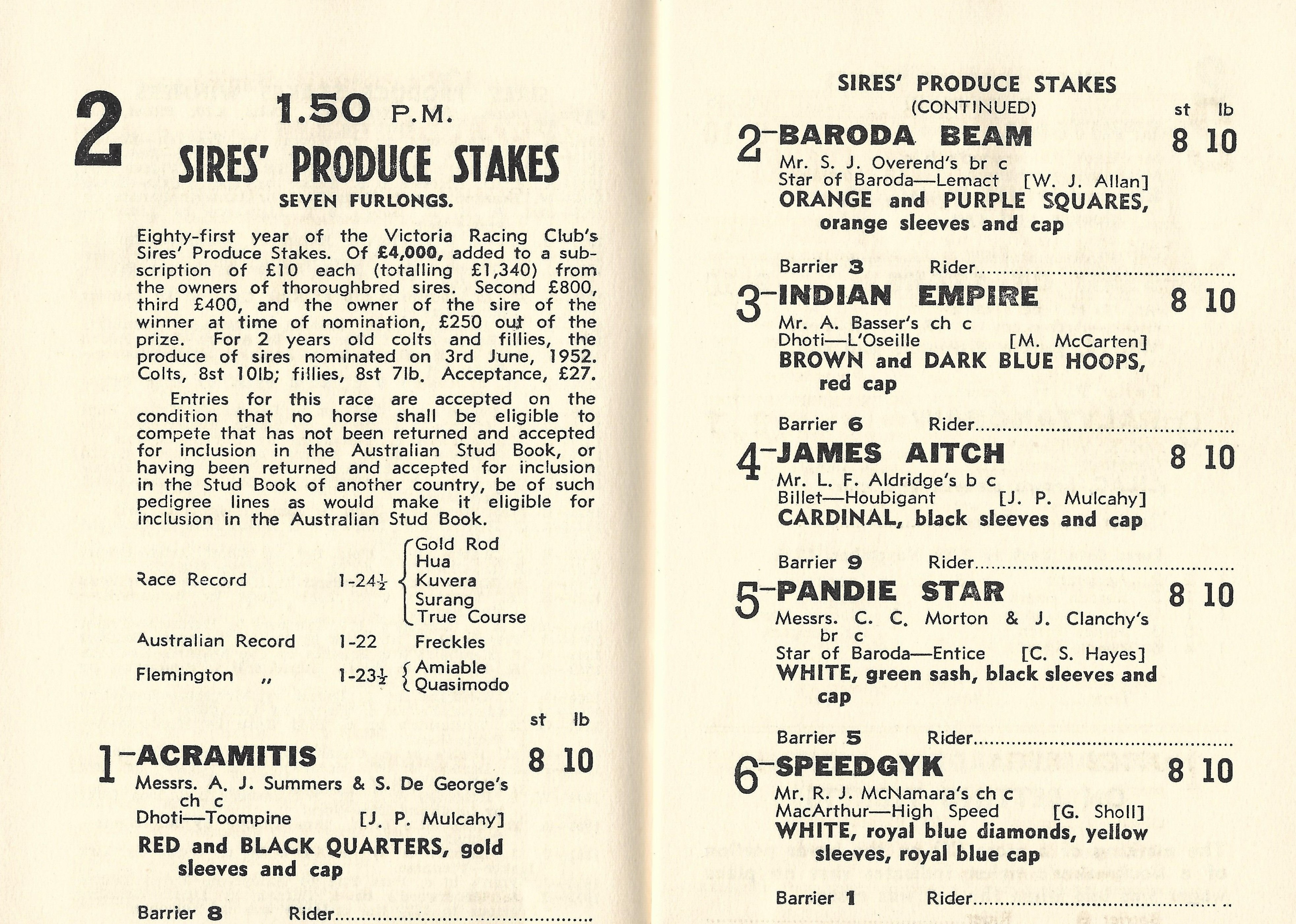
1954 VRC Sires Produce Stakes page showing the winner, Acramitis

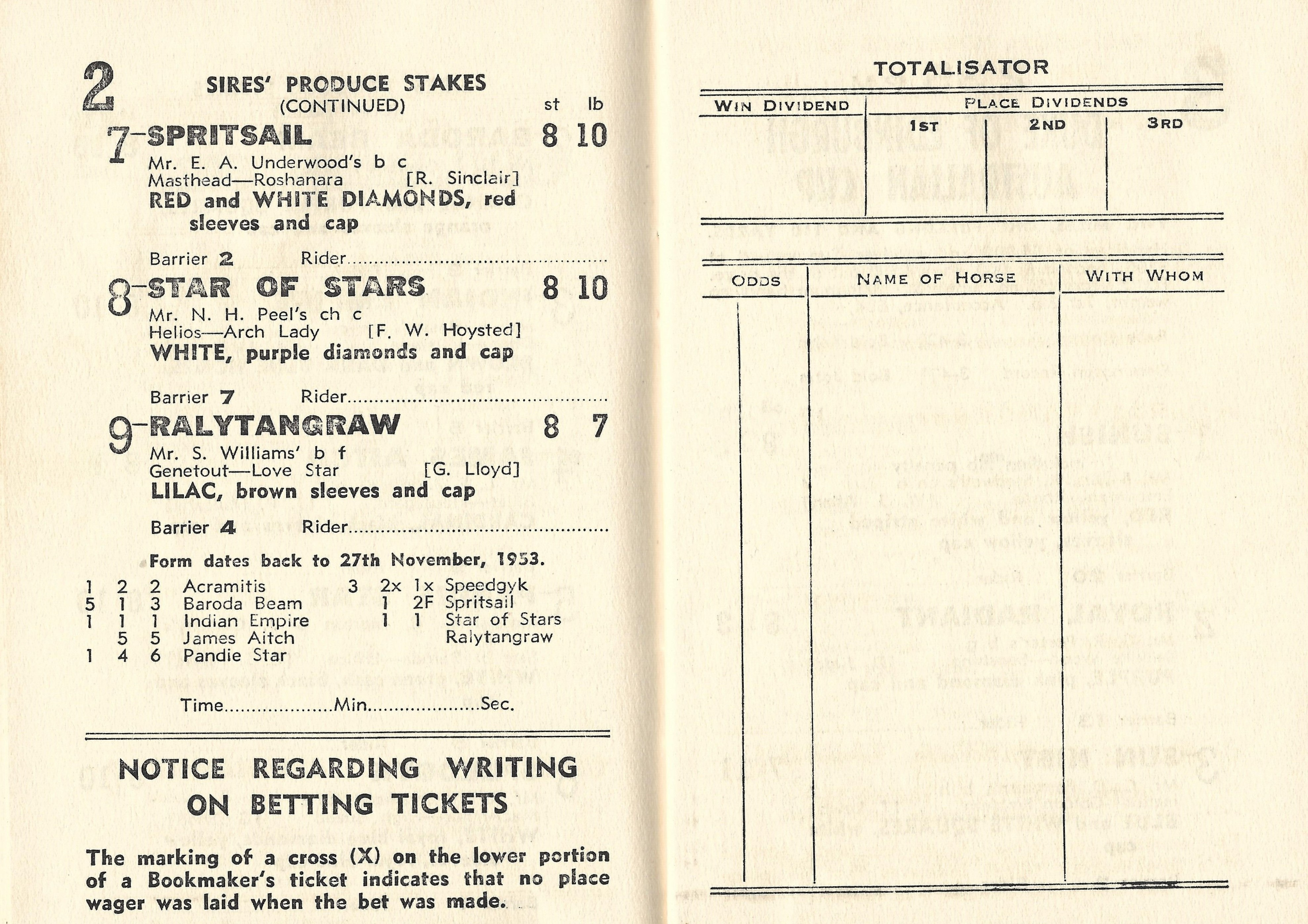
1954 VRC Sires Produce Stakes page starters and results

=== Distance ===
- In 1862–63 - 1 mile (~1600 metres)
- 1864–1919 - 6 furlongs (~1200 metres)
- 1920–1972 - 7 furlongs (~1400 metres)
- 1973 onwards - 1400 metres

=== Grade ===
- 1862–1979 - Principal Race
- 1979–2005 - Group 1
- 2005 onwards - Group 2

=== Name ===
- 1866–67 - Flemington Stakes
- 1868 - Sapling Stakes
- 1873 - Ascot Vale Stakes

== Winners ==
The following are past winners of the race.

- 2026 - Grinzinger Heart
- 2025 - Vinrock
- 2024 - Traffic Warden
- 2023 - Veight
- 2022 - Let'srollthedice
- 2021 - Lightsaber
- 2020 - Lunar Fox
- 2019 - La Tene
- 2018 - Not A Single Cent
- 2017 - Sircconi
- 2016 - Seaburge
- 2015 - Jameka
- 2014 - Zululand
- 2013 - Twilight Royale
- 2012 - All Too Hard
- 2011 - Running Tall
- 2010 - Shamrocker
- 2009 - Rostova
- 2008 - Von Costa De Hero
- 2007 - Incumbent
- 2006 - De Lago Mist
- 2005 - Danger Looms
- 2004 - Barely A Moment
- 2003 - Winestock
- 2002 - Pillaging
- 2001 - Spectatorial
- 2000 - Preserve
- 1999 - Testa Rossa
- 1998 - Coup De Grace
- 1997 - Millward
- 1996 - My Duke
- 1995 - Lochrae
- 1994 - Blevic
- 1993 - Pride Of Rancho
- 1992 - King Marauding
- 1991 - Not Related
- 1990 - Canny Lad
- 1989 - Rechabite
- 1988 - Wonder Dancer
- 1987 - Kaapstad
- 1986 - Simbolico
- 1985 - True Version
- 1984 - Street Cafe
- 1983 - Brave Show
- 1982 - Grosvenor
- 1981 - Full On Aces
- 1980 - Outward Bound
- 1979 - Mighty Kingdom
- 1978 - Pacifica
- 1977 - Bold Zest
- 1976 - Desirable
- 1975 - Lord Dudley
- 1974 - Skyjack
- 1973 - Imagele
- 1972 - Century
- 1971 - Tolerance
- 1970 - Dual Choice
- 1969 - Vain
- 1968 - Flying Fable
- 1967 - Pratten Park
- 1966 - Storm Queen
- 1965 - Citius
- 1964 - Boeing Boy
- 1963 - Pago Pago
- 1962 - Jan's Image
- 1961 - Emblem
- 1960 - Wenona Girl
- 1959 - Travel Boy
- 1958 - Misting
- 1957 - Tulloch
- 1956 - Starover
- 1955 - Knave
- 1954 - Acramitis
- 1953 - Surang
- 1952 - Pure Fire
- 1951 - Usage
- 1950 - True Course
- 1949 - Iron Duke
- 1948 - Ungar
- 1947 - Chanak
- 1946 - Bold Beau
- 1945 - Nestor
- 1944 - Delina
- 1943 - Simmering
- 1942 - Regency
- 1941 - All Love
- 1940 - Trueness
- 1939 - High Caste
- 1938 - Nuffield
- 1937 - Hua
- 1936 - Gold Rod
- 1935 - Young Idea
- 1934 - Sir John
- 1933 - L'Elite
- 1932 - Kuvera
- 1931 - Mulcra
- 1930 - Thurlstone
- 1929 - Nedda
- 1928 - Mollison
- 1927 - Royal Feast
- 1926 - Rampion
- 1925 - Poetaster
- 1924 - Arendal
- 1923 - King Carnival
- 1922 - Scarlet
- 1921 - Isa
- 1920 - Gossine Hatan
- 1919 - Lisnavane
- 1918 - Palm Leaf
- 1917 - Thrice
- 1916 - Wolaroi
- 1915 - Red Signal
- 1914 - Woorak
- 1913 - Eubulus
- 1912 - Sheriff Muir
- 1911 - Wilari
- 1910 - Beverage
- 1909 - Mala
- 1908 - Mother Goose
- 1907 - Tangaroa
- 1906 - Antonius
- 1905 - The Infanta
- 1904 - Impress
- 1903 - Sweet Nell
- 1902 - Eleanor
- 1901 - United States
- 1900 - Finland
- 1899 - Revenue
- 1898 - Cordite
- 1897 - Aurum
- 1896 - Coil
- 1895 - Creme D'Or
- 1894 - Forward
- 1893 - Patron
- 1892 - Autonomy
- 1891 - Stromboli
- 1890 - Titan
- 1889 - Richelieu
- 1888 - Volley
- 1887 - Abercorn
- 1886 - Maddelina
- 1885 - Monte Christo
- 1884 - The Broker
- 1883 - Warwick
- 1882 - Guesswork
- 1881 - Royal Maid
- 1880 - Grand Prix
- 1879 - Petrea
- 1878 - His Lordship
- 1877 - Rapidity
- 1876 - Newminster
- 1875 - Maid Of All Work
- 1874 - The Flying Fox
- 1873 - race not held
- 1872 - race not held
- 1871 - race not held
- 1870 - race not held
- 1869 - race not held
- 1868 - race not held
- 1867 - race not held
- 1866 - race not held
- 1865 - Frolic
- 1864 - Freestone
- 1863 - Aruma
- 1862 - Musidora

== See also ==
- Sires' Produce Stakes (ATC)
- Sires' Produce Stakes (BRC)
- Sires' Produce Stakes (SAJC)
- Sires' Produce Stakes (WA)
- List of Australian Group races
- Group races
