= Karrakatta Plate =

Horse race in Perth, Western Australia

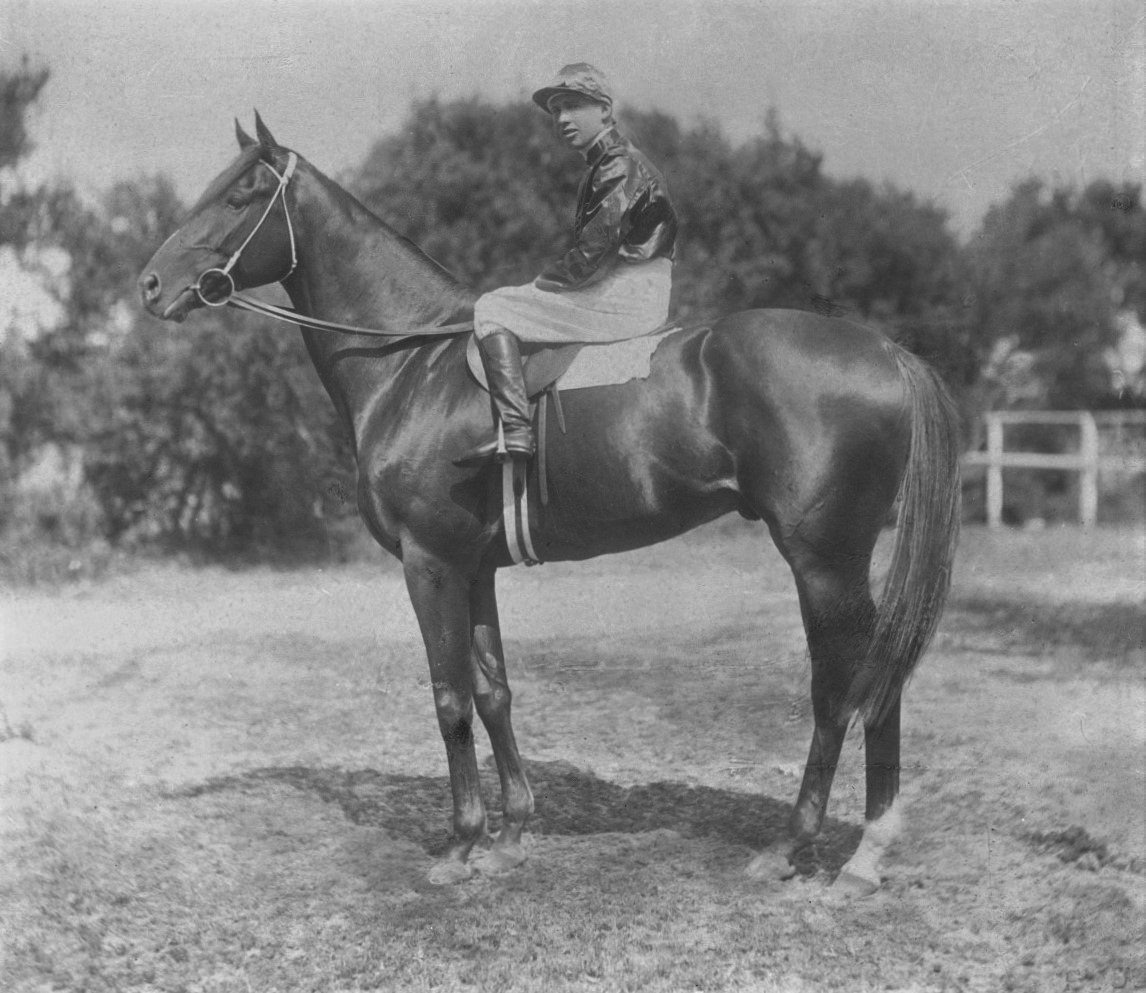
- Eurythmic, 1918 winner
- Class: Group 2
- Location: Ascot Racecourse, Perth, Western Australia
- Inaugurated: 1900
- Race type: Thoroughbred
- Sponsor: LawnPride Australia (2025 & 2026)

Race information
- Distance: 1,200 metres
- Surface: Turf
- Qualification: Two year old
- Weight: Set weights colts and geldings – 57 1/2 kg fillies – 55 1/2 kg
- Purse: $500,000 (2026)

The Karrakatta Plate is a Perth Racing Group 2 Thoroughbred horse race for two-year-olds, run at set weights, over a distance of 1200 metres at Ascot Racecourse, Perth, Western Australia in April.

== History ==
The race is considered the premier two-year-old race during the Perth racing season calendar. Originally the race was run in December in the racing calendar but today it is part of the Perth Racing Autumn Carnival.

=== 1953 racebook ===
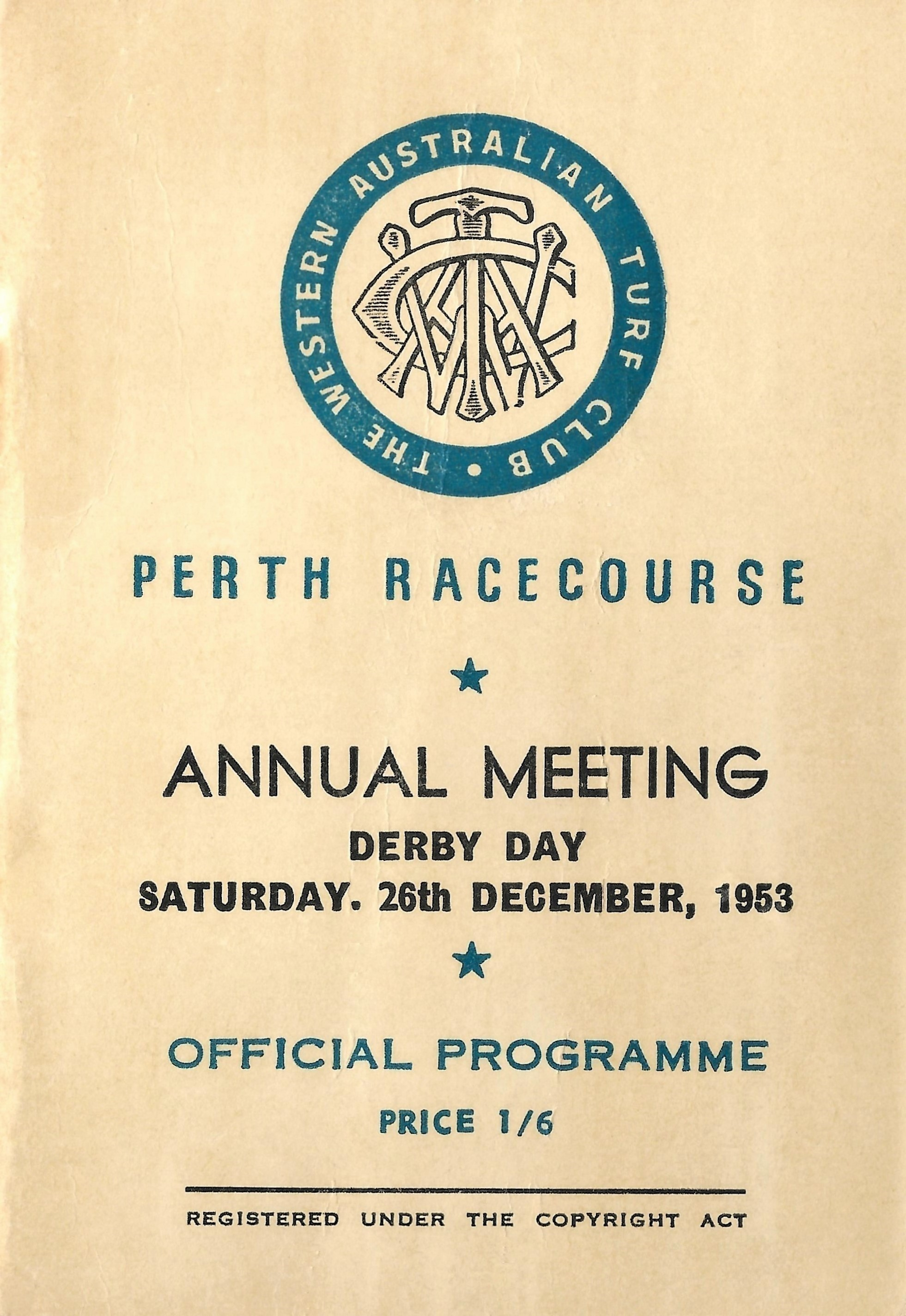
1953 WATC Derby racebook front cover

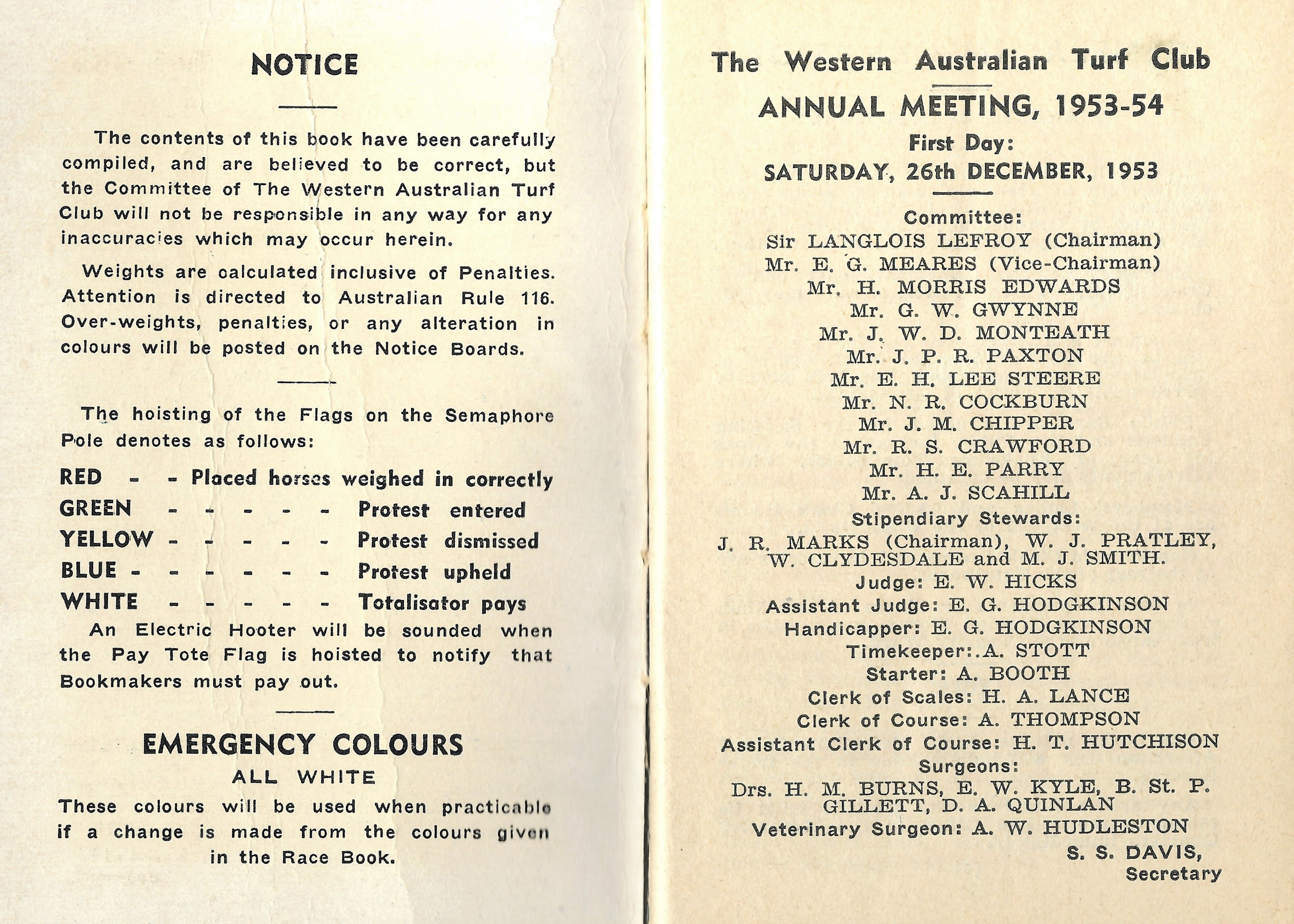
1953 WATC Derby showing raceday officials

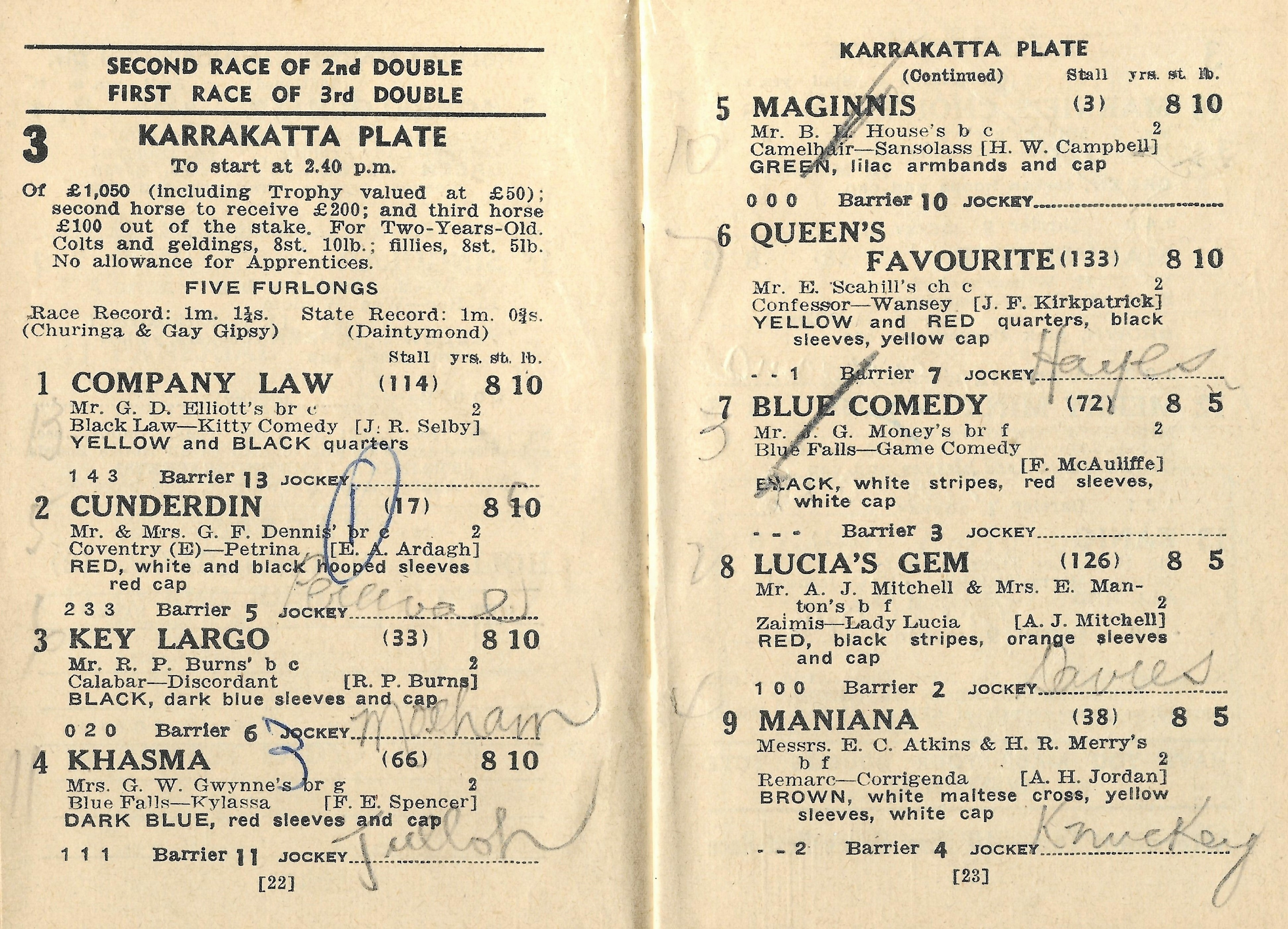
1953 WATC Karrakatta Plate page showing the winner, Cunderdin

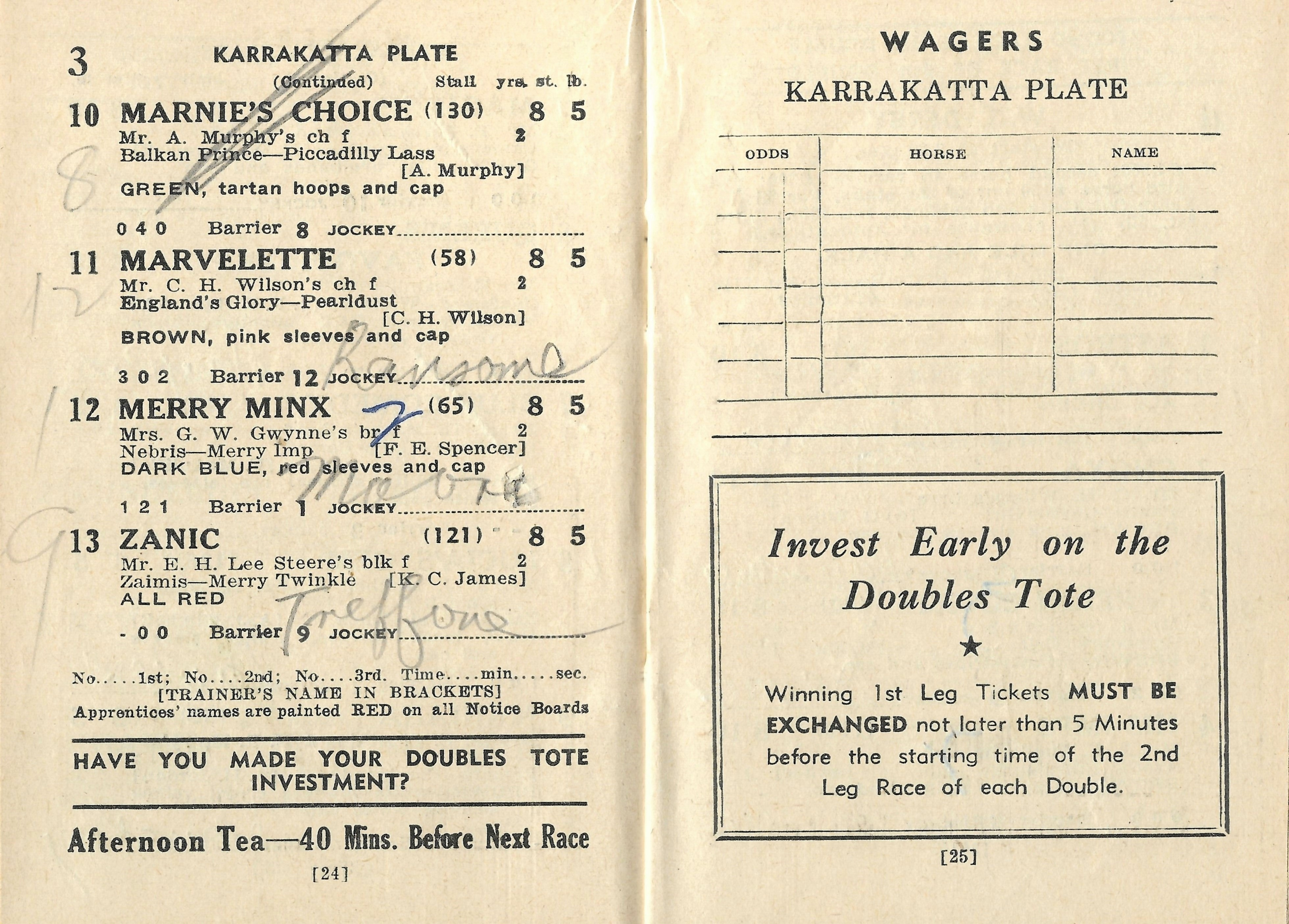
1953 WATC Karrakatta Plate page showing starters and results

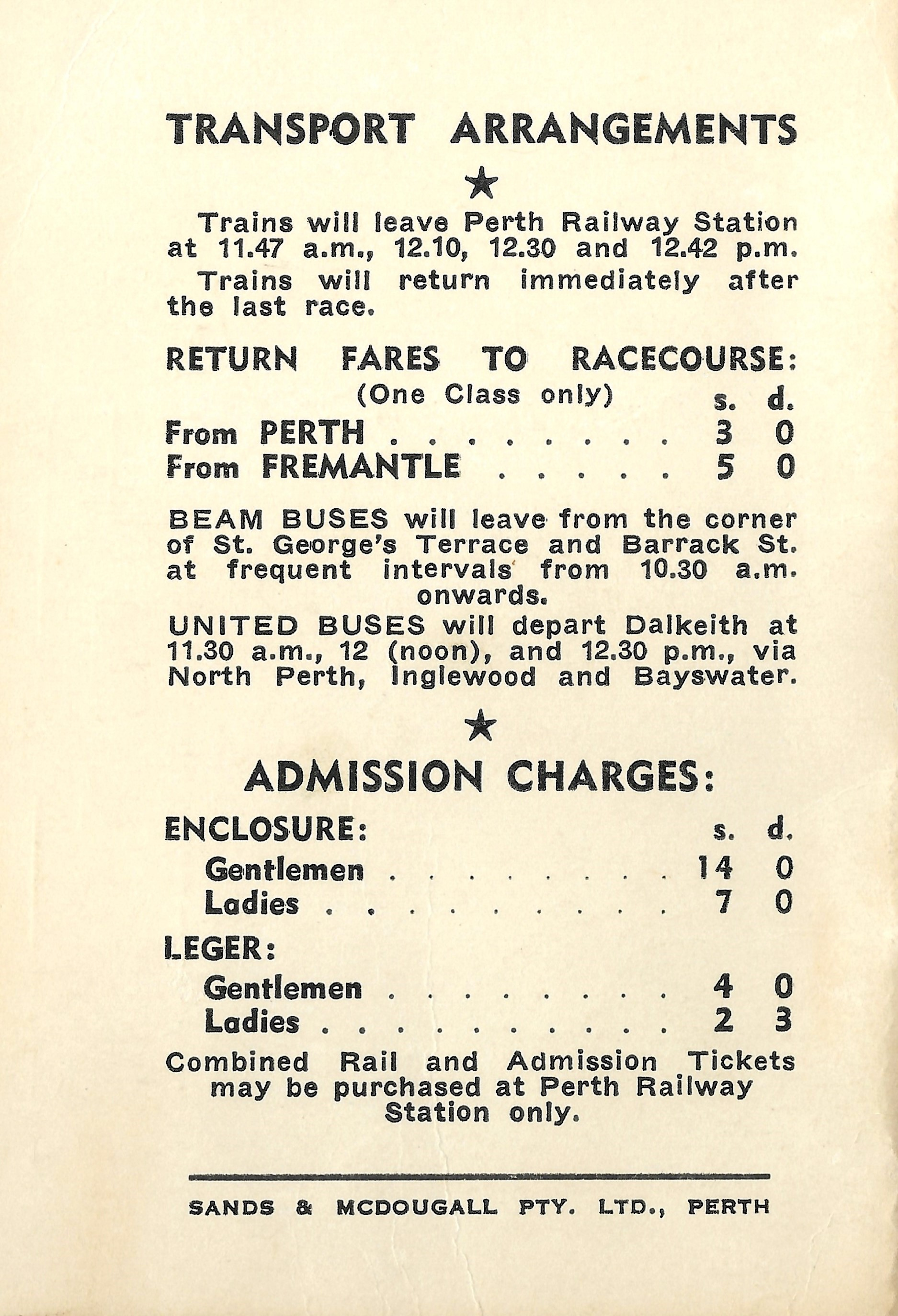
Back cover showing transport arrangements and admission charges

=== Distance ===
- 1900–1971 - 5 furlongs (~1000 metres)
- 1972–1979 – 1000 metres
- 1980 onwards - 1200 metres

=== Grade ===
- 1900–1978 - Principal Race
- 1979–1984 - Group 2
- 1985–1998 - Group 1
- 1999 onwards - Group 2

=== Venue ===
- In 2005 the race was run at Belmont Park Racecourse.
- 2006 onwards, the race has been run and won at Ascot Racecourse in April.

== Winners ==
The following are past winners of the race.

- 2026 - Afireofgidgeecoals
- 2025 - Talkanco
- 2024 - Bustling
- 2023 - Super Smink
- 2022 - Amelia's Jewel
- 2021 - Ex Sport Man
- 2020 - Ima Single Man
- 2019 - Dig Deep
- 2018 - Valour Road
- 2017 - Lucy Mae
- 2016 - Whispering Brook
- 2015 - Lucky Street
- 2014 - Hobart Jones
- 2013 - Ms Funovits
- 2012 - Luke's Luck
- 2011 - Night War
- 2010 - Motion Pictures
- 2009 - Gold Rocks
- 2008 - Brava Fortune
- 2007 - Roman Time
- 2006 - Canny Jack
- 2005 - No Questions
- 2004 - Redwoldt
- 2003 - Diffraction
- 2002 - Confront
- 2001 - Born Priceless
- 2000 - Metal Master
- 1999 - Climb The Vine
- 1998 - Bomber Bill
- 1997 - ¶Umah
- 1996 - Alabama Whirly
- 1995 - Daney Boy
- 1994 - Jacks Or Better
- 1993 - ‡race not held
- 1992 - Dynamic Beau
- 1991 - Lady Kariba
- 1990 - Umatilla
- 1989 - Highpak
- 1988 - Hold That Smile
- 1987 - Parlez Doux
- 1986 - Golden Unicorn
- 1985 - Blue Kristy
- 1984 - Vain Marceau
- 1983 - Scornvale
- 1982 - Top Post
- 1981 - Cheeky Trot
- 1980 - Anyone Home
- 1979 - Oaksana Boy
- 1978 - Elegant Shell
- 1977 - Rare Sovereign
- 1976 - Burgess Queen
- 1975 - Bodega
- 1974 - Super Red
- 1973 - Vain Prince
- 1972 - Miss Sunnytime
- 1971 - Solid Gold
- 1970 - Sans Sabre
- 1969 - Tricr
- 1968 - Par Avion
- 1967 - La Trice
- 1966 - Aquatic Star
- 1965 - Haze
- 1964 - Nanna Tale
- 1963 - Little Roderick
- 1962 - Son O' Minx
- 1961 - Astra Vista
- 1960 - Carol Vista
- 1959 - Autumn Vista
- 1958 - Queen Of The Nile
- 1957 - Spherical
- 1956 - Sanvista
- 1955 - Lady Orator
- 1954 - Hyperical
- 1953 - Cunderdin
- 1952 - Tangle
- 1951 - Copper Beech
- 1950 - Count Cimbrone
- 1949 - Fawzia
- 1948 - Nanette
- 1947 - Barlowerie
- 1946 - Churinga
- 1945 - Mayette
- 1945 - Beauperian
- 1944 - Dream Valley
- 1943 - race not held
- 1942 - Sky Borne
- 1941 - Jean James
- 1940 - Ruby
- 1939 - Romanette
- 1938 - Loyalist
- 1937 - Beaufiler
- 1936 - Gay Balkan
- 1935 - Casey
- 1934 - Modulus
- 1933 - Gay Gipsy
- 1932 - Esmeroic
- 1931 - Riveret
- 1930 - Chiliad
- 1929 - Gallant Airman
- 1928 - Three Stripes
- 1927 - Dawn Of Youth
- 1926 - Chrysene
- 1925 - Kongoni
- 1924 - Jolly Odd
- 1923 - Lace Girl
- 1922 - †His Double / Honneur
- 1921 - Yanda
- 1920 - Easingwold
- 1919 - Mount Prophecy
- 1918 - Eurythmic
- 1917 - Eudios
- 1916 - Green Lord
- 1915 - Bardeur
- 1914 - Welkin Queen
- 1913 - Hathor
- 1912 - Lucky Beggar
- 1911 - Miss Bob
- 1910 - Mousme
- 1909 - Louvima
- 1908 - Jolly Beggar
- 1908 - Blue Moon
- 1907 - Thorina
- 1906 - Romulus
- 1905 - Simelle
- 1904 - Betsy Burke
- 1903 - Hurley Burley
- 1902 - San Toy
- 1901 - race not held
- 1900 - Willie

¶ The race was run in December 1996 as part of the 1996–97 racing season.
‡ Race moved in the WATC racing calendar forward from summer (December) to late summer (February) of 1994
† Dead heat

== See also ==
- Sires' Produce Stakes (WA)
- The Quokka
- List of Australian Group races
- Group races
