= David Gould (rower) =

New Zealand rower and businessman (1925–2020)

Personal information
- Full name: David Churchill Gould
- Born: 19 October 1925 Christchurch, New Zealand
- Died: 28 April 2020 (aged 94) Christchurch, New Zealand
- Education: Christ's College
- Occupation: Businessman
- Relatives: Humphrey Gould (brother); George Gould (grandfather); Edward Elworthy (great-grandfather); Churchill Julius (great-grandfather); Awdry Julius (great-uncle); George Julius (great-uncle)

Sport
- Country: New Zealand
- Sport: Rowing
- Club: Avon Rowing Club
- Coached by: Rangi Thompson

Achievements and titles
- National finals: Coxless pair champion (1948)
Medal record
Men's rowing
Representing New Zealand
British Empire Games
Silver medal – second place	1950 Auckland	Coxless pair

David Churchill Gould (born 19 October 1925 – 28 April 2020) was a New Zealand rower and businessman. He won a silver medal representing his country in the men's coxless pair with his brother, Humphrey, at the 1950 British Empire Games.

== Early life and family ==
Born in the Christchurch suburb of Fendalton on 19 October 1925, Gould came from a well-connected Canterbury family. His father was Derrick William Joseph Gould, a prominent businessman, racehorse owner and captain of the New Zealand polo team, and his mother was Elisabeth Mary Gould (née Elworthy). His paternal grandfather was George Gould, whose father, also called George Gould, was one of the founders in 1851 of the financial agents Gould Beaumont and Company that in 1919 amalgamated with two other firms to become Pyne Gould Guinness, one of New Zealand's largest stock and station agents. Other notable relatives on his father's side of the family include his father's cousin, the historian George Macdonald, and former British Labour MP Bryan Gould, who is a descendant of the elder George Gould. David's mother was a granddaughter of both Churchill Julius, the first Anglican Archbishop of New Zealand, and Edward Elworthy, an important landowner in South Canterbury. She was thus a first cousin of Charles Elworthy, Baron Elworthy, and niece of Sir George Julius and Awdry Julius.

On 8 December 1925, David Gould was baptised by his great-uncle, Archdeacon Awdry Julius, at St Barnabas's Church, Fendalton. Gould was educated at Christ's College from 1939 to 1943. He married Jill Marye Featherston MacRae, daughter of noted Thoroughbred breeder Ian MacRae who bred the mare Leilani, which won the 1974 Caulfield Cup and finished second in the Melbourne Cup the same year.

== Rowing ==
Gould was a member of the Avon Rowing Club. With his younger brother Humphrey, he won the coxless pair title at the New Zealand national rowing championships in 1948. The following year, they did not defend their title at the national championships, but instead were members of Avon's crews in the fours and eights; combining with the Lindstrom brothers, they were runners-up in the fours. At the 1950 British Empire Games, raced at Lake Karapiro, Gould again joined with his brother Humphrey to contest the men's coxless pair. Coached by Rangi Thompson, they won the silver medal, finishing in a time of 8:10, four lengths behind the victorious Australian crew.

== Business ==
Gould joined the family firm, Pyne Gould Guinness, and worked his way up to be appointed a director in 1955, and sat as chairman of The Press.

== Other activities ==
Gould served as master of the Christchurch Hunt.
