= Humphrey Gould =

New Zealand rower

Personal information
- Full name: Arthur Humphrey Gould
- Born: 30 August 1927 Christchurch, New Zealand
- Died: 19 September 2000 (aged 73) Christchurch, New Zealand
- Education: Christ's College
- Occupation: Businessman
- Spouse: Betsy Simson (m. 1953)
- Relatives: David Gould (brother); George Gould (grandfather); Edward Elworthy (great-grandfather); Churchill Julius (great-grandfather); Awdry Julius (great-uncle); George Julius (great-uncle)

Sport
- Country: New Zealand
- Sport: Rowing
- Club: Avon Rowing Club
- Coached by: Rangi Thompson

Achievements and titles
- National finals: Coxless pair champion (1948)
Medal record
Men's rowing
Representing New Zealand
British Empire Games
Silver medal – second place	1950 Auckland	Coxless pair

Arthur Humphrey Gould (30 August 1927 – 19 September 2000) was a New Zealand rower who won a silver medal representing his country in the men's coxless pair with his brother, David, at the 1950 British Empire Games. Humphrey Gould was also a prominent businessman in Christchurch, rising to become managing director of the stock and station firm Pyne Gould Guinness.

== Early life and family ==
Born in Christchurch on 30 August 1927, Gould came from a well-connected Canterbury family. His father was Derrick William Joseph Gould, a prominent businessman, racehorse owner and captain of the New Zealand polo team, and his mother was Elisabeth Mary Gould (née Elworthy). His paternal grandfather was George Gould, whose father, also called George Gould, was one of the founders in 1851 of the financial agents Gould Beaumont and Company that in 1919 amalgamated with two other firms to become Pyne Gould Guinness, one of New Zealand's largest stock and station agents. Other notable relatives on his father's side of the family include his father's cousin, the historian George Macdonald, and former British Labour MP Bryan Gould, who is a descendant of the elder George Gould. Humphrey's mother was a granddaughter of both Churchill Julius, the first Anglican Archbishop of New Zealand, and Edward Elworthy, an important landowner in South Canterbury. She was thus a first cousin of Charles Elworthy, Baron Elworthy, and niece of Sir George Julius and Awdry Julius.

On 25 October 1927, Humphrey Gould and his twin brother, Robin, were baptised by their great-grandfather, Archbishop Julius, at St Barnabas's Church in Fendalton. Sir Charles Campbell, 12th Baronet of Auchinbreck was one of their godparents. Gould was educated at Christ's College from 1941 to 1945, where he was a prefect, captain of the rowing team, and played as a lock in the school's 1st XV rugby team.

In 1953, Gould married Betty Ann (Betsy) Simson from Hawke's Bay, and the couple went on to have two children.

== Rowing ==
Gould was a member of the Avon Rowing Club. With his older brother David, he won the coxless pair title at the New Zealand national rowing championships in 1948. The following year, they did not defend their title at the national championships, but instead were members of Avon's crews in the fours and eights; combining with the Lindstrom brothers, they were runners-up in the fours. At the 1950 British Empire Games, raced at Lake Karapiro, Gould again joined with his brother David to contest the men's coxless pair. Coached by Rangi Thompson, they won the silver medal, finishing in a time of 8:10, four lengths behind the victorious Australian crew.

During the 1960s, Gould was a rowing coach and administrator for Canterbury and the University of Canterbury.

== Business ==
After leaving school, Gould joined the family firm, Pyne Gould Guinness, beginning as a mailboy, and working his way up to become managing director in 1973. He also served on the boards of various companies, including Mount Cook Group, and The Press from 1984 to 1987.

== Other activities ==
Gould served as treasurer of the Canterbury Agricultural and Pastoral Association between 1963 and 1977, and was the organisation's president in 1978. He was also a committee member at the Canterbury Jockey Club, and was one of the founders of the Christchurch Squash Club. He became the honorary consul of Sweden in Christchurch in 1981.

== Death ==
Gould died in Christchurch on 19 September 2000. His wife, Betsy, died on 10 April 2012.
