= Elworthy (disambiguation) =

Elworthy may refer to:

== Places ==
- Elworthy, village in Somerset, England
- Elworthy Barrows, Iron Age hill fort about 2 km from Elworthy village

== People ==
- Charles Elworthy, Baron Elworthy (1911–1993), Royal Air Force senior officer, Chief of the UK Defence Staff
- Charles Elworthy (scientist) (born 1961), New Zealand economist and social scientist
- David Elworthy, British mathematician
- Edward Elworthy (1836–1899), New Zealand farmer and businessman
- Frank Elworthy (1893–1978), South African cricketer
- Frederick Thomas Elworthy (1830–1907), English philologist and antiquary
- Jonathan Elworthy (1936–2005), New Zealand politician
- Sir Peter Elworthy (1935–2004), New Zealand farmer and businessman
- Robert Pearce Elworthy (1845 – 1925), British entrepreneur
- Scilla Elworthy (born 1943), Scottish founder of the Oxford Research Group for dialogue on nuclear weapons policy and of Peace Direct supporting peace-builders in conflict areas
- Steve Elworthy (born 1965), South African former international cricketer, now a cricket administrator
