= Regent Street (disambiguation) =

Regent Street is a street in London, England.

Regent Street may also refer to:

- Regent Street, Cambridge, England
- Regent Street, Ltd.
