= Charles Elworthy =

Charles Elworthy may refer to:

- Charles Elworthy, Baron Elworthy (1911–1993), Chief of the Defence Staff
- Charles Elworthy (scientist) (1961–2023), New Zealand economist and social scientist
