= Eva Julius =

Australian Girl Guide leader

Eva Julius OBE
- Julius from a 1937 newspaper
- Born: Eva Drongsia Odierna O'Connor; 1878; Hokitika, New Zealand
- Died: 5 July 1972 (aged 93–94); Wahroonga, New South Wales, Australia
- Occupations: Girl Guide leader and child welfare worker
- Spouse: George Julius
- Children: 3 sons

Eva Drongsia Odierna Julius, Lady Julius OBE (née O'Connor; 1878 – 5 July 1972) was an Australian Girl Guide Commissioner and child welfare worker. She was a recipient of the Silver Fish Award, Girl Guiding's highest adult award.

== Early life and family ==
Eva Drongsia Odierna O'Connor was born in Hokitika, New Zealand, to Susan Laetitia and Charles Yelverton O'Connor. She was one of seven siblings, including Bridget Yelverton Lee Steere. The family moved to Western Australia in 1891. She married the inventor George Alfred Julius on 7 December 1898. They had three sons. George was knighted in 1929, at which point Eva became Lady Julius.

Julius was an ardent gardener. Her garden featured a scenic model railway, built during their children's adolescence; it was called "one of the mechanical wonders of the world" and featured waterways, functioning cranes and lighting. They held many garden fetes featuring the railway, with Lady Julius' charities often the beneficiaries.

Julius was "well versed in science, art and literature". A 1936 profile in The Sun, in a series "Leaders of Women", described her as "one of the most feminine of our feminists, this latter word being used in its most flattering sense."

After Sir George died in 1946 she moved into a modest flat in Killara, Sydney. She died on 5 July 1972 and was privately cremated.

== Girl Guides ==
Julius was associated with Girl Guiding in New South Wales for many years. She called it "the most important youth movement in the world."

She was a member of the Executive of the Australian Girl Guides Association for many years becoming State Commissioner of New South Wales from 1939 to 1949. When she stepped down from the role she was elected vice-president of the Association, a position she held until at least 1955. She received the Silver Fish Award, Girl Guiding's highest adult honour, presented by HRH the Duchess of Gloucester in 1946. She began working at the New South Wales Girl Guide Gift Shop in 1948, becoming its patron in 1960.

== Child welfare ==
=== Kindergartens and day nurseries ===
Julius was "actively interested in kindergartens, day nurseries and the Crippled Children's Society." She began working at Newtown Free Kindergarten, one of Australia's first kindergartens, in 1915 "as I had finished my own personal kindergarten at home." By 1930, she was president of the organisation.

She was involved in a successful 'adoption' scheme, where any member of the public could ‘adopt’ a child's early education, by covering their kindergarten fees of £6 a year.

In 1935 she organised an "old English fair" which raised enough money to wipe out the debts of the 16 free kindergartens that comprised the Kindergarten Union. The following year she was elected president of the Kindergarten Union. remaining a member until at least 1949.

In 1936 her aim was to achieve "co-operation between the day nurseries and kindergartens" such that children who had outgrown nursery could begin to receive 'training' rather than simply having their basic needs of food, hygiene and amusement met.

=== Disabled children's welfare ===
Julius was heavily involved in the welfare of disabled children. She was:

- on the board of the Darling Point-Woollahra branch of the Crippled Children's Society
- on the executive committee of the Citizens' Crippled Children Service Campaign
- on the executive committee of the Rotary Club's Crippled Children's Service Fund
- president of Crippled Children’s Silver Bridge Appeal
- on the board of the New South Wales Society for Crippled Children
- vice-president of the Women's Council of the New South Wales Society for Crippled Children

== Other community work ==
- 1930s:Member, Sydney Symphony Orchestra
- 1931: Patron, New Zealand Association
- 1934: President, Ladies' Committee for the International Concert in Aid of the Benevolent Society in Sydney
- 1935: Patron, Hopewood House Musicales
- 1936: President, RSPCA Ball
- 1937: Member, East Sydney Technical College Advisory Council
- 1940–45: Hon. Organiser of the Comforts Depot (Lord Mayor's Patriotic War Fund of New South Wales) and Hon. Advisor in 1945
- 1941–42: Chair, Women’s Committee of the Lord Mayor’s Patriotic War Fund
- 1942: Winner of the YWCA National Shilling Drive Popular Grandmother Competition, receiving 37,482 votes
- 1949: Vice-president, Lady Gowrie Model Centre
