= Rangi Thompson =

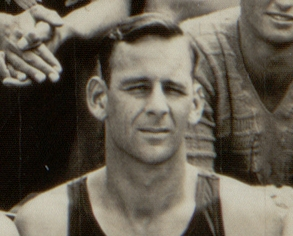
- Thompson at the 1932 Olympic Games

Personal information
- Born: Frederick Haughton Thompson; 31 March 1908 Christchurch, New Zealand
- Died: 15 December 1971 (aged 63)
- Height: 1.87 m (6 ft 1 1/2 in)
- Weight: 80 kg (176 lb)
- Spouse: Monica Roche (d. 1961)

Sport
- Country: New Zealand
- Sport: Rowing
- Club: Avon Rowing Club
Medal record
Men's rowing
Representing New Zealand
Olympic Games
Silver medal – second place	1932 Los Angeles	Coxless pair
British Empire Games
Silver medal – second place	1930 Hamilton	Eights
Bronze medal – third place	1938 Sydney	Eights

Frederick Haughton "Rangi" Thompson (31 March 1908 – 15 December 1971) was a New Zealand rower who represented his country at one Olympic and two British Empire Games, winning a medal at each.

== Biography ==
Born in Christchurch on 31 March 1908, Thompson was the son of Ellen and Frederick Thompson. A member of the Avon Rowing Club, he began rowing in 1926.

Thompson represented New Zealand at the 1930 British Empire Games in Hamilton, Ontario. He was a member of the men's eight that won the silver medal, finishing three-quarters of a length behind the victorious English crew.

At the 1932 Summer Olympics in Los Angeles, Thompson was a member of the New Zealand crews in the men's coxless pair and the men's eight. Partnered with Cyril Stiles in the coxless pair, he progressed to the final via the repêchage, and went on to win the silver medal. They finished half a length behind the gold medal crew from Great Britain after breaking a stay on the stroke rigger 600 m from the end of the race. The New Zealand eight was eliminated in the repêchage.

Thompson again competed for New Zealand in the men's eight at the 1938 British Empire Games in Sydney, where he was a member of the bronze medal-winning crew.

Thompson worked as a tanner at the Woolston Tanneries in Christchurch, where he was involved in a serious accident in July 1943. He caught his left arm in a machine used for stripping hides, and it took 45 minutes for him to be extricated. His arm was later amputated at Christchurch Hospital. He later became a greengrocer.

Despite his accident, Thompson continued his involvement with the Avon Rowing Club, and coached David and Humphrey Gould, who won the silver medal in the coxless pair at the 1950 British Empire Games in Auckland.

Thompson died on 15 December 1971, and he was buried at Ruru Lawn Cemetery, Christchurch.
