= Alice Julius =

New Zealand artist (1846-1918)

- Born: Alice Frances Rowlandson; 1846; Madras, India
- Died: 1918 (aged 71–72)
- Resting place: Linwood Cemetery
- Spouse: Churchill Julius (m. 1872; died 1918)
- Children: 7

Alice Frances Julius (née Rowlandson, 1846 – 30 September 1918) was a New Zealand artist and wife to the first Archbishop of New Zealand, Churchill Julius.

== Biography ==
Alice Julius was born Alice Frances Rowlandson in 1846, in Madras, India to Michael John Rowlandson and Mary Catherine Awdrey. She married Churchill Julius on 18 June 1872 in Bournemouth, Hampshire, England. They had five daughters and two sons, Awdry who went into the Church in New Zealand and George, engineer and prolific inventor of the Totalisator. Brown describes Julius as a shadowy figure, and states that "she was active in a variety of organisations, but seems to have been, perhaps because of ill health, a reserved person. Although she managed her household effectively she was, in public, overshadowed by her voluble and extroverted husband."

She died on 30 September 1918, predeceasing her husband by 20 years. She was buried in Linwood Cemetery, Christchurch, and in 1938, her husband was also interred there.

== Works ==
She has several drawings now housed within the Christchurch Art Gallery Te Puna o Waiwhetū. They are largely landscapes or studies of flora in pencil. They were donated by her grand-nieces to the gallery in 1975. Several of her works were in an exhibition Die Cuts and Derivations (11 March – 2 July 2023).
