= Robert Pearce Elworthy =

British entrepreneur

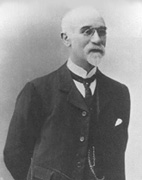
- Born: 28 March 1845; Wiveliscombe, Somerset, UK
- Died: 1 April 1925 (aged 80)
- Other names: Robert Elvorti
- Occupations: Engineer and entrepreneur
- Organization(s): R & T Elworthy

Robert Pearce Elworthy (28 March 1845 – 1 April 1925) was a British entrepreneur who, with his brother Thomas, founded R & T Elworthy (АТ «Ельворті Роберт і Томас»), an agricultural enterprise in pre-1914 Russia, with 42 branches throughout the Russian Empire. The business sold agricultural machinery made at its works in Elizabethgrad (later renamed Kirovograd, then Kropyvnytskyi), in Ukraine.

== Early life and education ==
Robert Elworthy was the eldest son of Edward Elworthy (1821–1872), a yeoman farmer of Wiveliscombe, Somerset. He had three brothers and three sisters, all of whom were educated in local schools. In 1865 Robert took out Articles of Apprenticeship with Boston engineers Tuxford & Sons, for a term of three years.

== Career in America ==
In 1868 he left for the United States. A year later he was appointed Inspector of Works by the Baltimore Bridge Company, then engaged in building the Wabash Bridge (St Charles, Missouri). During his three years in the US, Robert invested much of his savings in property, which was to provide the capital for his next enterprise, this time in partnership with his brother Thomas.

== Life in Ukraine ==
Encouraged by the support of Clayton of Clayton & Shuttleworth, agricultural engineers of Lincoln, the brothers established a foundry at Elizabethgrad in Ukraine, where from 1874 onwards the firm of R & T Elworthy manufactured seed drills and threshing machines. as well as importing ploughs and Blackmore oil engines from Germany. In 1887 Robert returned home to marry his cousin, Mary Pearce of Sampford Peverell. Over the next few years six children were born. The one cloud in his life was the sudden death from pneumonia, at the age of 44, of Thomas, Robert's brother and partner. In memory of his brother, Robert built a school, established an experimental farm for breeding horses and helped finance Elizabethgrad's theatre and tram service.

== R & T Elworthy Ltd ==
The family company was converted into a Joint Stock Company in 1908, registered in St Petersburg. The business had expanded to such an extent that by 1914 it employed over 2,500 workers and had 42 branches throughout the Russian Empire. The Omsk branch was run by Robert's eldest son, Edward, but on the outbreak of war Edward returned to England, where he joined the Royal Engineers. In 1915 his unit landed at Suvla Bay in Gallipoli and there he was posted as missing. It was to be many months before his death was confirmed. In 1917 his second son, Tom, was killed on the Western Front.

== Later events ==
Robert was in England when war broke out. He set up a head office in Victoria Street, London, and never again returned to Ukraine. The Elizabethgrad business was run by a team headed by the general manager, Alfred Youngman. In 1916 part of the factory was turned over to making trench mortars for the war effort. By the end of 1917 the plant employed more than 7,000 workers. Robert, meanwhile, lived in Hendon, London with his family.

From 1918 onwards the town was occupied successively by Austrian and German troops, the White Russian army and, finally the Red army. The factory was taken over at gunpoint and without compensation. Robert submitted a detailed claim for compensation to the British Foreign Office, but no compensation was paid.

In 1925 Robert travelled to Maribor, in Yugoslavia, to investigate a new business opportunity but died there on 1 April 1925.

== Postscript ==
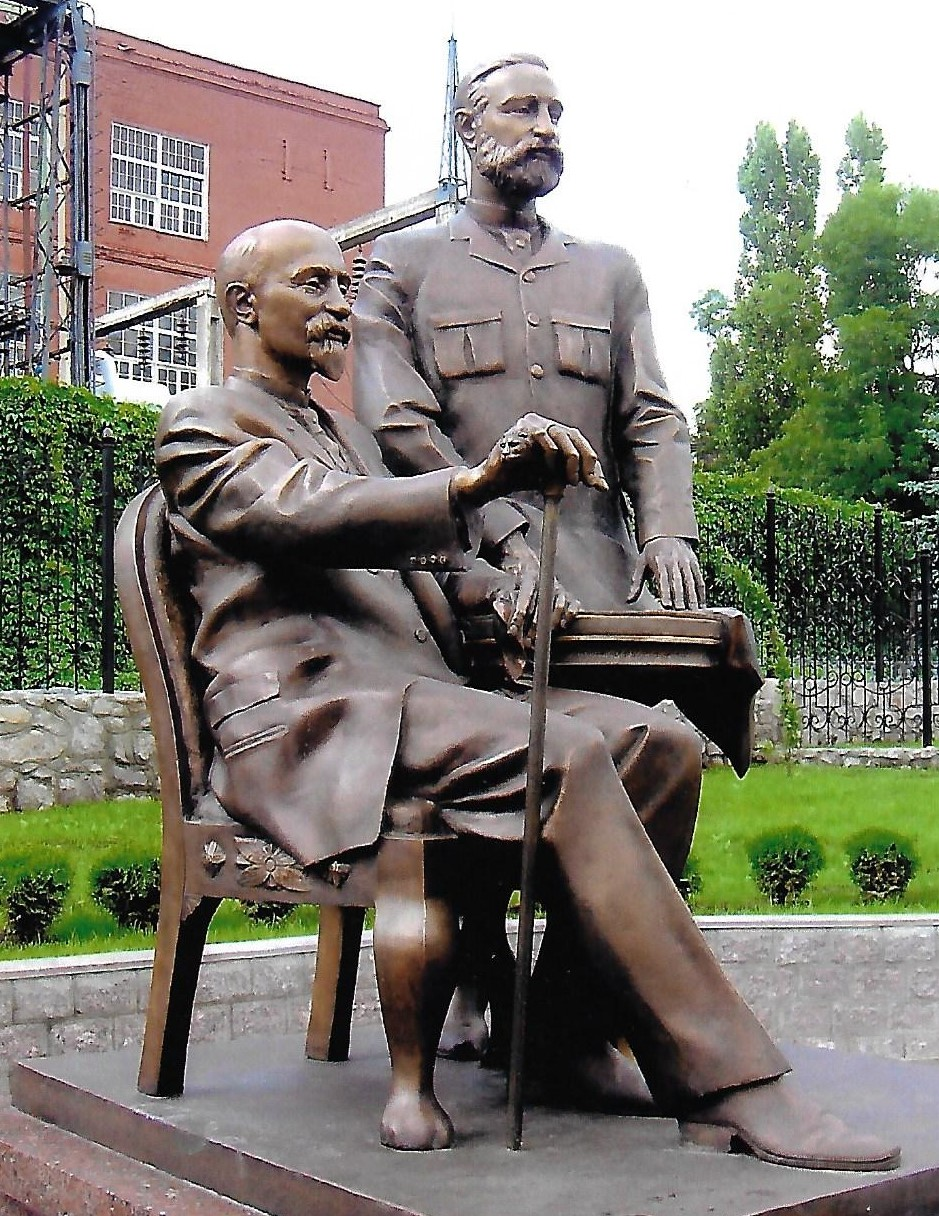
Statue of Robert and Thomas Elworthy in Kropyvnytskyi

The plant in Ukraine, renamed the Red Star Factory (Червона зірка), continued to make agricultural machinery under the Communist regime.

In 1987, the Berlin Wall fell and a new era opened. Tsarist money held by Barings Bank since 1917 was now released by the Bank of England and some of this was paid as compensation to the heirs and successors of R & T Elworthy. Michael Clarkson Webb, one of Robert Elworthy's grandsons, established the Elworthy Scholarship scheme which enabled 24 Ukrainian students to complete their education at boarding schools in Britain.

In 2016 the factory was renamed once again – to Elvorti (Ельворті, the Ukrainian equivalent of Elworthy).

In the city of Kropyvnytskyi, there is a statue of the brothers Robert and Thomas Elworthy, an Elvorti museum located in Robert Elworthy's former residence, and a Robert Elworthy Institute of Economics and Technology (formerly the Kirovograd Institute of Commerce).
