= New Regent Street =

Street in Christchurch, New Zealand

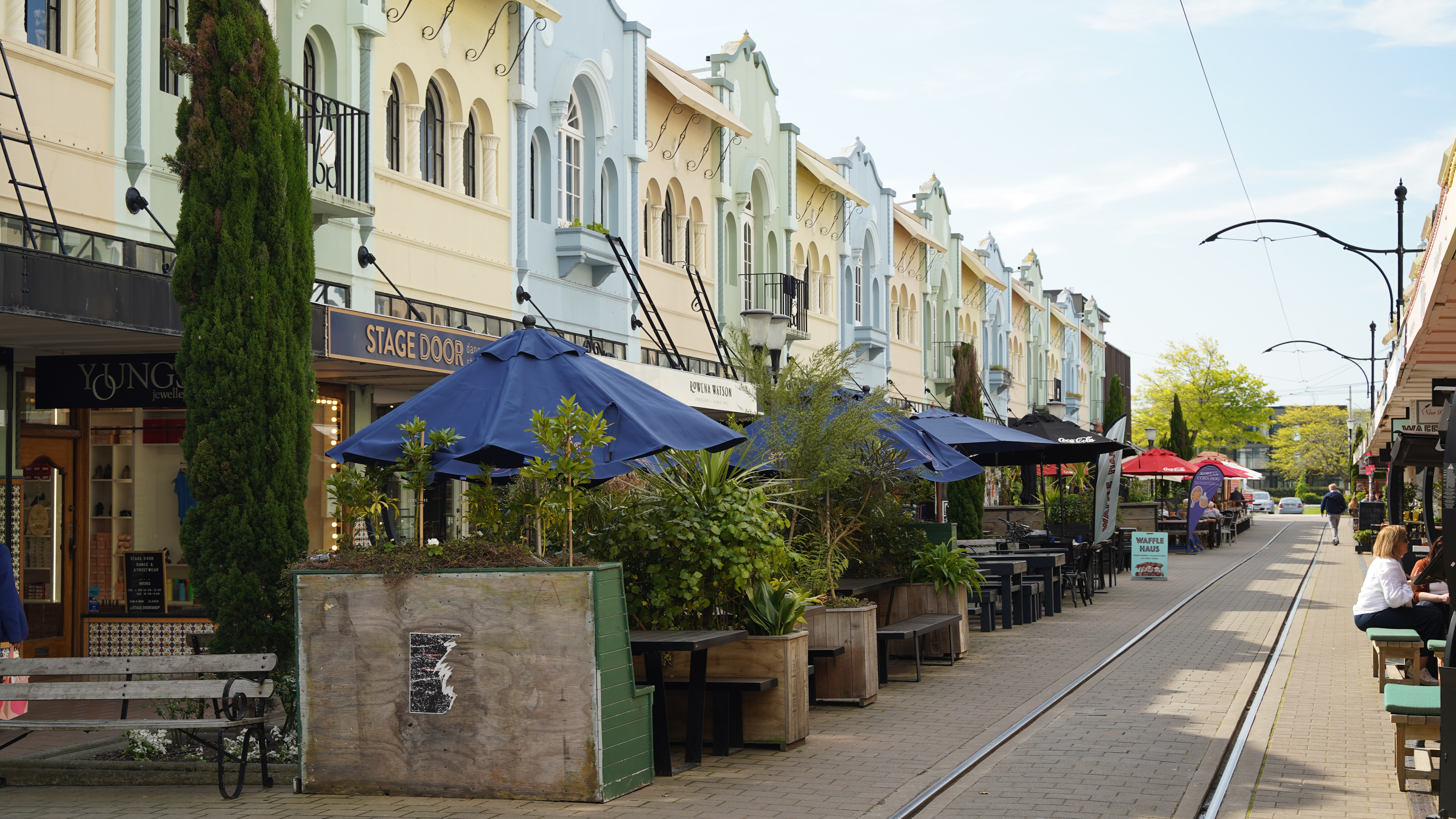
- Looking North along New Regent Street in 2023

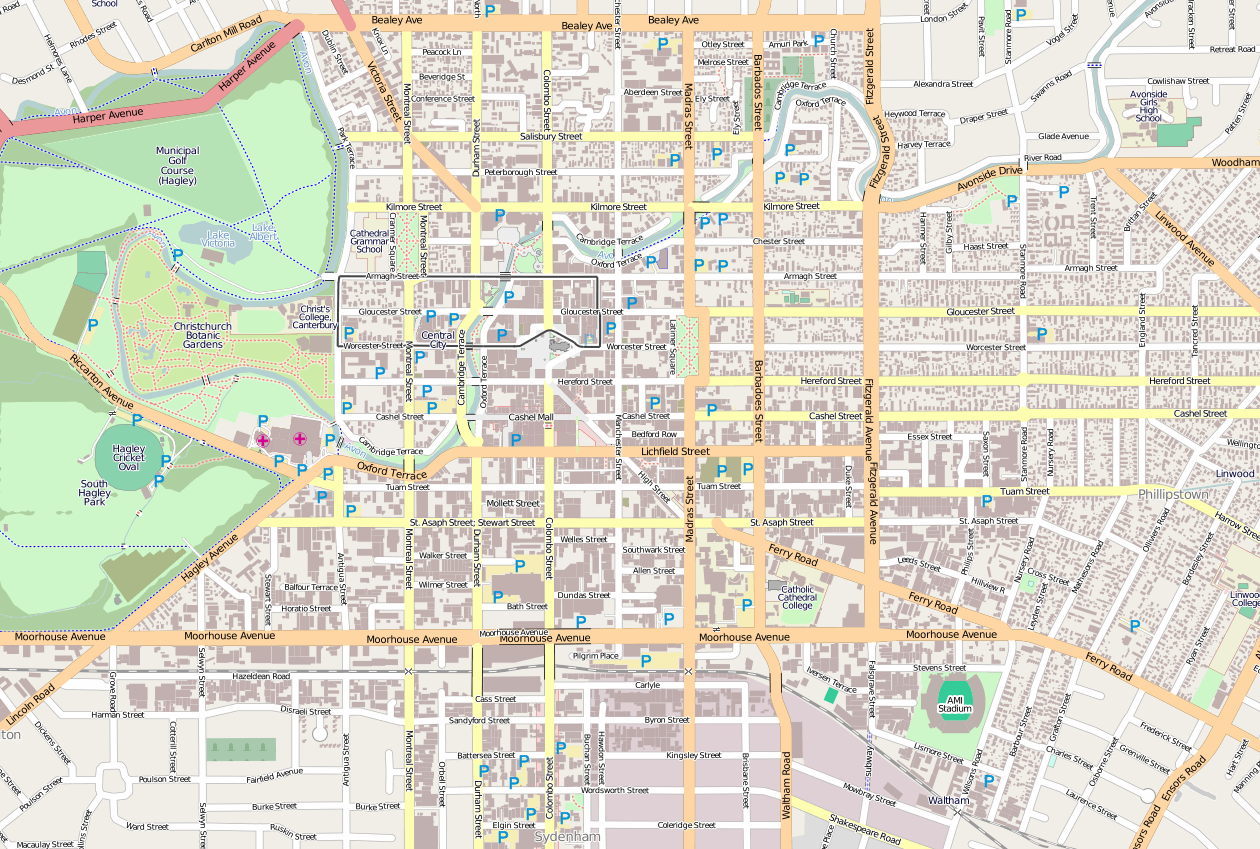
- Location within Christchurch

General information
- Type: Terrace shops
- Architectural style: Spanish Mission architecture
- Location: Christchurch Central City, New Regent Street, Christchurch, New Zealand
- Coordinates: 43°31′45.35″S 172°38′19.39″E
- Elevation: 9 m (30 ft)
- Current tenants: 40 buildings individually tenanted
- Construction started: January 1931
- Completed: 1 April 1932
- Renovated: 2012/13
- Client: Arthur Francis Stacey (1888–1952) for Regent Street Ltd
- Owner: 40 buildings individually owned

Technical details
- Floor count: two

Design and construction
- Architect: Francis Willis
- Main contractor: P. Graham and Son, Limited

Heritage New Zealand – Category 1
- Designated: 28 June 1990
- Reference no.: 4385

References
- "New Regent Street Terrace Shops". New Zealand Heritage List/Rārangi Kōrero. Heritage New Zealand.

New Regent Street is a pedestrian mall in Christchurch. Built as a private development in the early 1930s with 40 shops in Spanish Mission architectural style, it is one of the city's major tourist attractions. Providing a number of small shops as a comprehensive development was an advanced idea at the time, and New Regent Street is regarded as a forerunner to modern shopping malls. Due to its coherent architectural character, the buildings in the streets are listed as Category I heritage items by Heritage New Zealand, and in addition, the entire street has a historic area listing. The street was pedestrianised in 1994 in preparation for the introduction of the Christchurch heritage tram, which began operation in February 1995. Damaged in the February 2011 Christchurch earthquake, the street and buildings reopened in April 2013, and the tram returned from November of that year. Following the 2016 Valentine's Day earthquake, five of the buildings that had not been repaired after the previous earthquakes had been cordoned off, which stopped the tram from operating on its original heritage loop until May.

== Background and location ==
New Regent Street is located in the Christchurch Central City. It is oriented in a north–south direction and placed between Armagh Street at its north end, and Gloucester Street on its south side. Cathedral Square, the centre of Christchurch, is located one block over to the south-west. What is now New Regent Street was originally known as "The Circus paddock", as visiting circuses would make use of the land. From 1888, the land was occupied by a building called the Colosseum. The Colosseum was initially an ice skating rink, then used for a boot factory, became a taxi rank for some time and in 1908, it was Christchurch's first movie theatre. The Colosseum was demolished in January 1931.

== History ==
=== Development ===
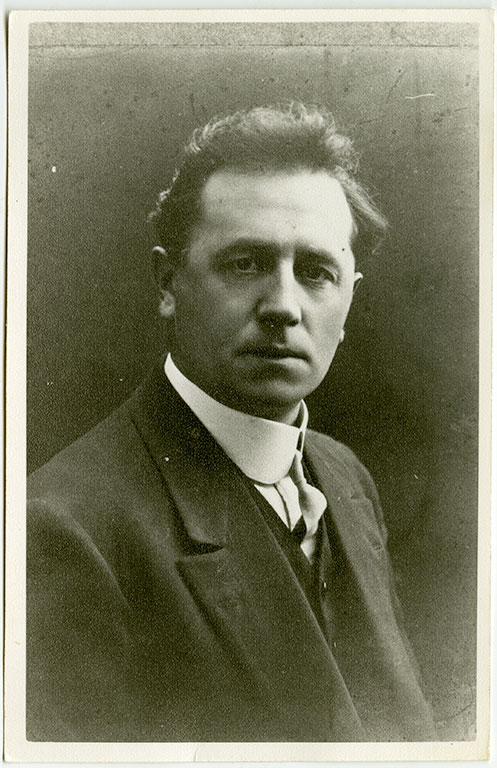
Arthur Stacey, the driving force behind the creation of New Regent Street

In 1929, businessman and chairman of The Press, George Gould, proposed a variety of measures to relieve traffic congestion in Colombo Street and Cathedral Square, including a new bridge over the Avon River connecting Oxford Terrace with Durham Street south, and a new diagonal street from the Armagh Street / Manchester Street intersection to Gloucester Street near its intersection with Colombo Street. The latter proposal would have required the demolition of the Colosseum. Gould suggested this diagonal street be called Little High Street, in reference to the diagonal High Street further south in the central city. Only two weeks after Gould's proposal, a group of businessman led by Arthur Francis Stacey put a proposal for a new street with a Spanish theme to Christchurch City Council's town planning committee. The group had secured options on the Colosseum and on those two properties that separated the Colosseum from access onto Armagh Street. The plans had been drawn by Francis Willis, who had previously been employed by Christchurch City Council as their architect, but who had since 1924 been self-employed. Stacey and his business partners had formed a company called Regent Street Limited in 1929; other company directors were David Manson, Alexander Hamilton Forbes (brother of Prime Minister George Forbes), and John Joseph Dougall. By February 1930, the project had been approved in principle by Christchurch City Council. The concept of a number of small shops all built as a comprehensive development was advanced for its time, and can be regarded as the forerunner of modern shopping malls.

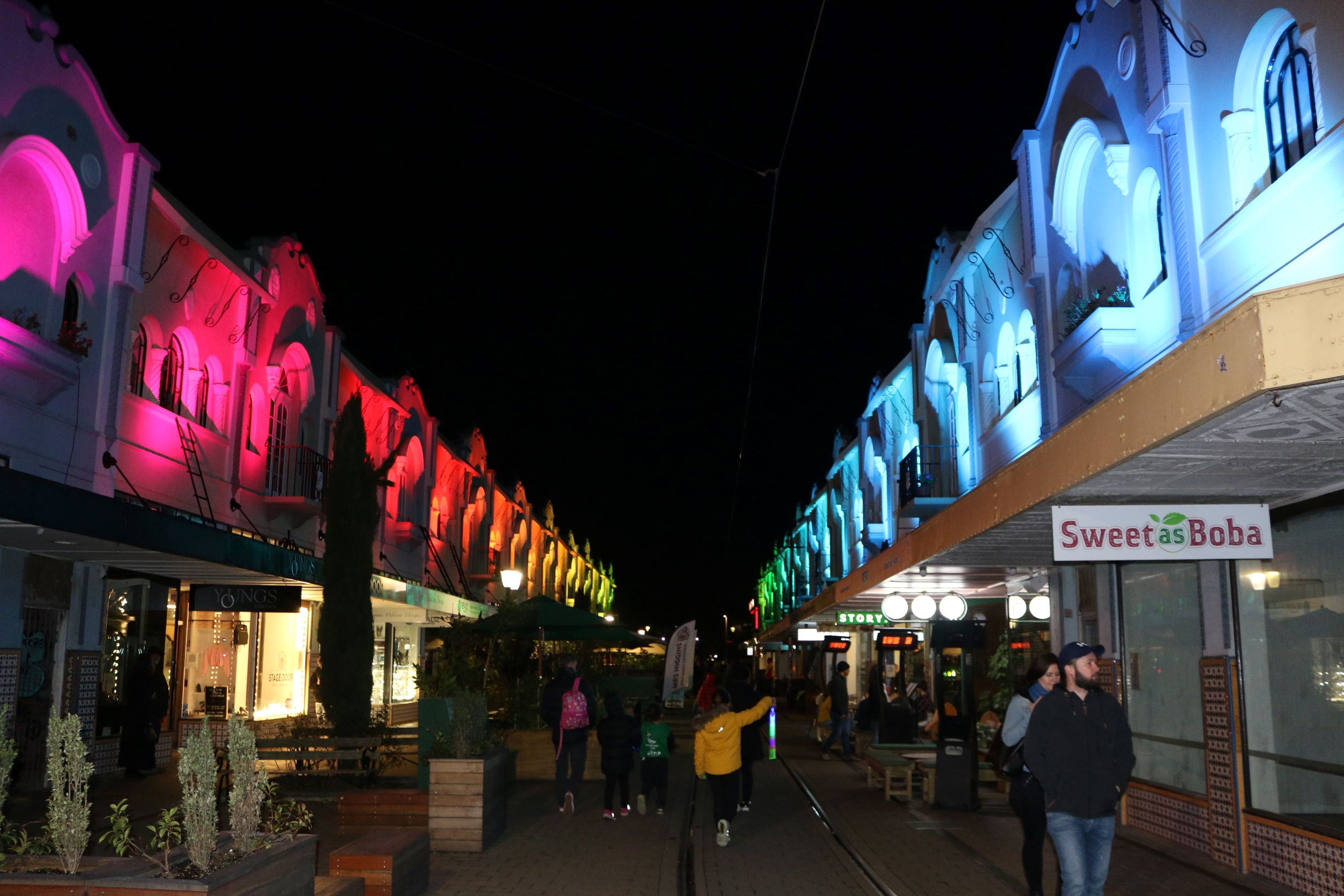
New Regent Street during the Matariki celebrations (June 2021)

A building permit for the construction of the buildings was imminent, but had not been issued by January 1931, while the demolition of the Colosseum was carried out. The contract for the construction of the 40 buildings and the roadway was let to the Boyle Brothers for NZ£32,000. The builder did not perform and the contract was retendered for approximately NZ£32,000, with P. Graham and Son, Limited, as the successful party. The overall cost of the project was NZ£90,000. The street was built at a width of 40 feet (12 m), and the north–south length of Christchurch Central City blocks is 330 feet (100 m). The sculptor William Trethewey carried out some of the interior decorations.

The company asked for the street to be named Regent Street, but the Christchurch City Council declined the request on the grounds that a street of that name already existed in Sydenham, and suggested New Regent Street instead. Regent Street in Sydenham was renamed Roxburgh Street in 1948. New Regent Street is named for London's Regent Street, itself that city's first planned street, and built between 1814 and 1825.

The street was finished in late March 1932. One of its features was a lighting system consisting of 400 lamps, and when this was first switch on for a trial on 24 March, hundreds of citizens went for a walk down the 100 metres (330 ft) long street. To make use of the lighting, the formal opening was held on the evening of 1 April 1932. The proceedings were chaired by Dan Sullivan, the Mayor of Christchurch, who also gave the first speech. Other speakers were David Manson (chairman of Regent Street Ltd), city councillor A. H. Andrews (chairman of the town planning committee), and Stacey. Mrs. Manson then cut the ribbon. During the opening speech of the mayor, the crowd was entertained by a person from the crowd warning of a man with a sword, reference to the de Groot incident that happened at the Sydney Harbour Bridge two weeks earlier where a protester cut the ribbon prior to the official ceremony.

The opening happened during the depth of the Great Depression, and it was one of only a few larger projects undertaken in the South Island at the time. Whilst Manson claimed in his speech at the opening that half the shops had been let, only three shops were actually occupied. Later in 1932, the contractor, P. Graham and Son, took two of the directors (Manson and Forbes) to court over outstanding payments of NZ£1,000. The contractor won the case and was awarded costs.

Problems with parking for extended periods of time occurred and in April 1933, parking of cars in New Regent Street was time-restricted to 20 minutes. Around the same time, Regent Street Limited was in financial difficulty and petition to wind up the company was filed, and the judge gave the company a fortnight to pay up, which resolved the issue. Regent Street Limited sold off individual shops in the 1940s until all 40 units were in private ownership. The roadway was transferred to Christchurch City Council, making it a public road, after World War II.

=== Pedestrian mall ===
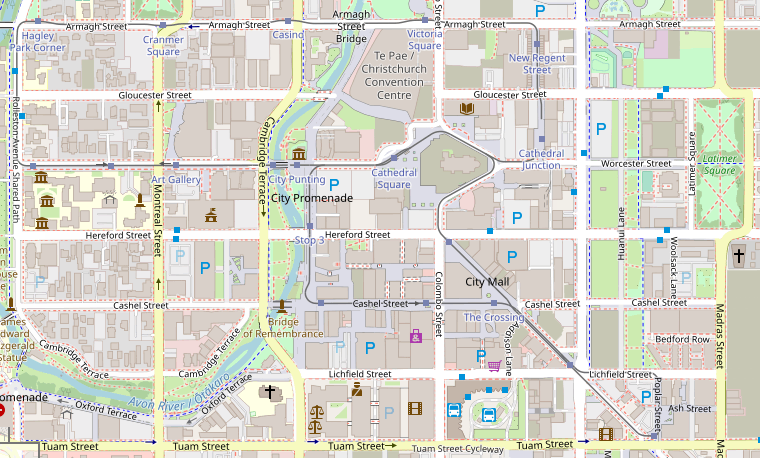
New Regent Street forms the north-eastern extent of the original Christchurch heritage tramway circuit

In 1986, a one-way restriction was imposed for driving on New Regent Street. This measure was in place for only eight years before the street was closed to automobile traffic in 1994 and turned into a pedestrian mall in preparation for the reintroduction of the Christchurch tram. Originally, it was intended for the tram to go back and forth along Worcester Street, but the plans were changed and a loop created, with Rolleston Avenue, Armagh Street, New Regent Street and the John Britten property known as Cathedral Junction making up the route. The tram began operating on 4 February 1995.

=== Earthquakes ===
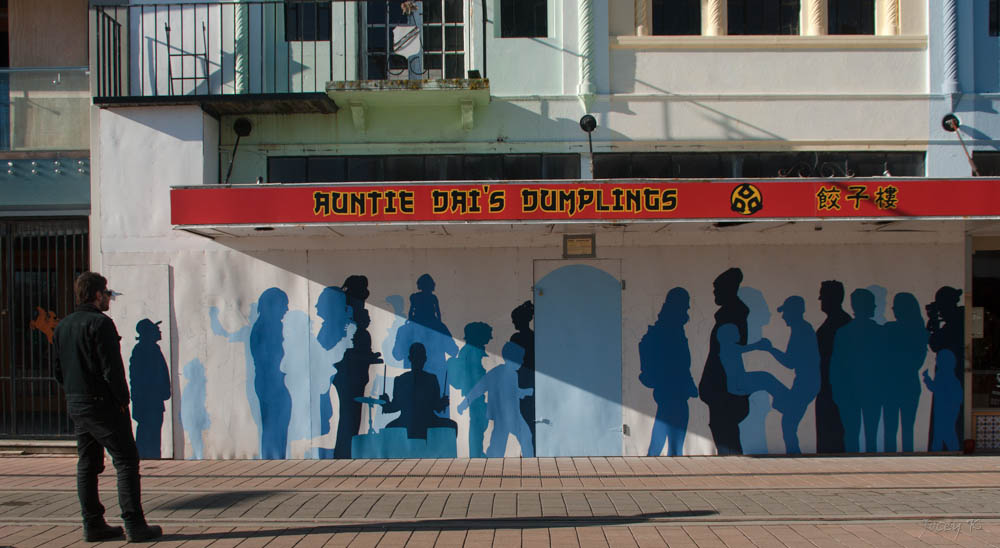
Two of Thacker's shops that are unrepaired and boarded up

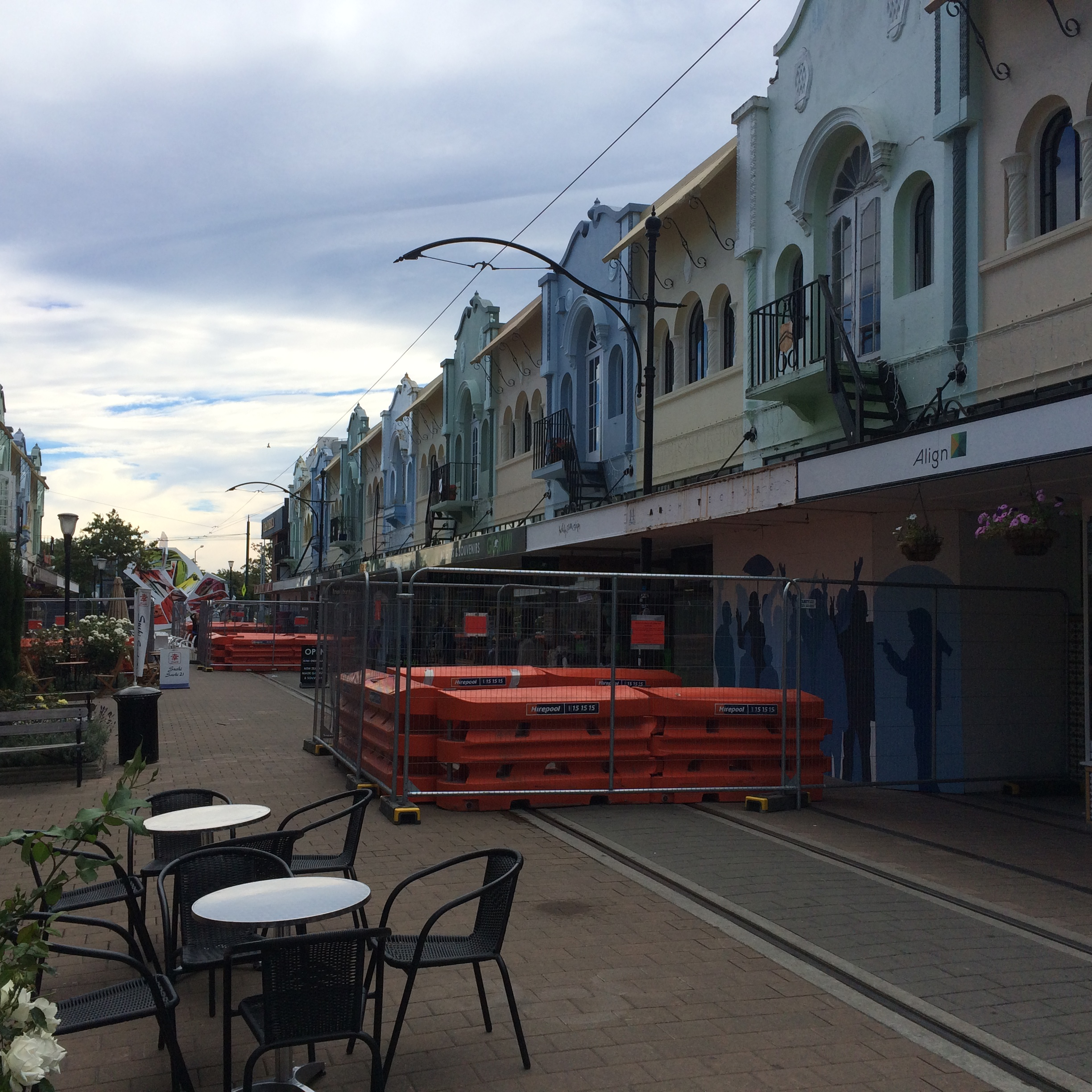
Thacker's five properties in New Regent Street were cordoned off after the 2016 Valentine's Day earthquake.

The buildings sustained damage during the 22 February 2011 Christchurch earthquake with structures "perform[ing] well" due to their design. The whole central city was cordoned off, and the public did not have access. Repairs to the street and buildings were carried out by Naylor Love Construction Limited for NZ$3,000,000, with Fulton Ross Team Architects providing the architectural inputs. New Regent Street was set to be reopened in December 2012, but this was delayed to February 2013, and then March, and it finally did open on Saturday, 20 April 2013. The Press described the opening as an "anti-climax", as only five of the shops were open for business. A further fourteen shops had been tenanted but were not ready, while tenants for seven shops had yet to be found. Five of the buildings, all owned by Helen Thacker, had not been repaired or earthquake strengthened. Two of those buildings were classed as earthquake-prone, and after months of negotiations by Canterbury Earthquake Recovery Authority staff, the owner agreed to have those two buildings earthquake strengthened. This allowed for safety fences to be removed from New Regent Street in December 2013.

The tram began operating again in November 2013 on a limited route from New Regent Street to Worcester Boulevard; the tracks in Armagh Street had to be repaired still. In November 2014, the pre-earthquake loop reopened. Some New Regent Street retailers claim that half their custom comes from tourist arriving there by tram.

Following the 2016 Valentine's Day earthquake, the five properties in New Regent Street owned by Helen Thacker were cordoned off due to risk of collapse of their façades, which stopped the tram from doing its traditional route through the pedestrian mall. Later on, a further two properties not owned by Thacker were cordoned off. The operator of the tramway, Michael Esposito from Welcome Aboard, claimed that the tram had so far brought 100,000 customers to New Regent Street during the 2015/16 summer. Tim Hunter, the chief executive of Christchurch & Canterbury Tourism, lamented that the inaction of one owner "will put us back in the world news as not being visitor friendly." The street's spokesperson stated that business had been "disappointing" while the tram was not operating. The barriers were removed and the tram began operating again on 1 May 2016.

== Heritage registrations ==
The buildings were classified as Category I heritage items by the New Zealand Historic Places Trust (since renamed Heritage New Zealand) on 28 June 1990, with registration number 4385. On 27 October 1994, the New Zealand Historic Places Trust registered the street as a historic area, with registration number 7057. The buildings are listed in the Christchurch District Plan as group 2 heritage buildings.

== See also ==
- List of historic places in Christchurch
