= St Barnabas Church, Christchurch =

St Barnabas Church
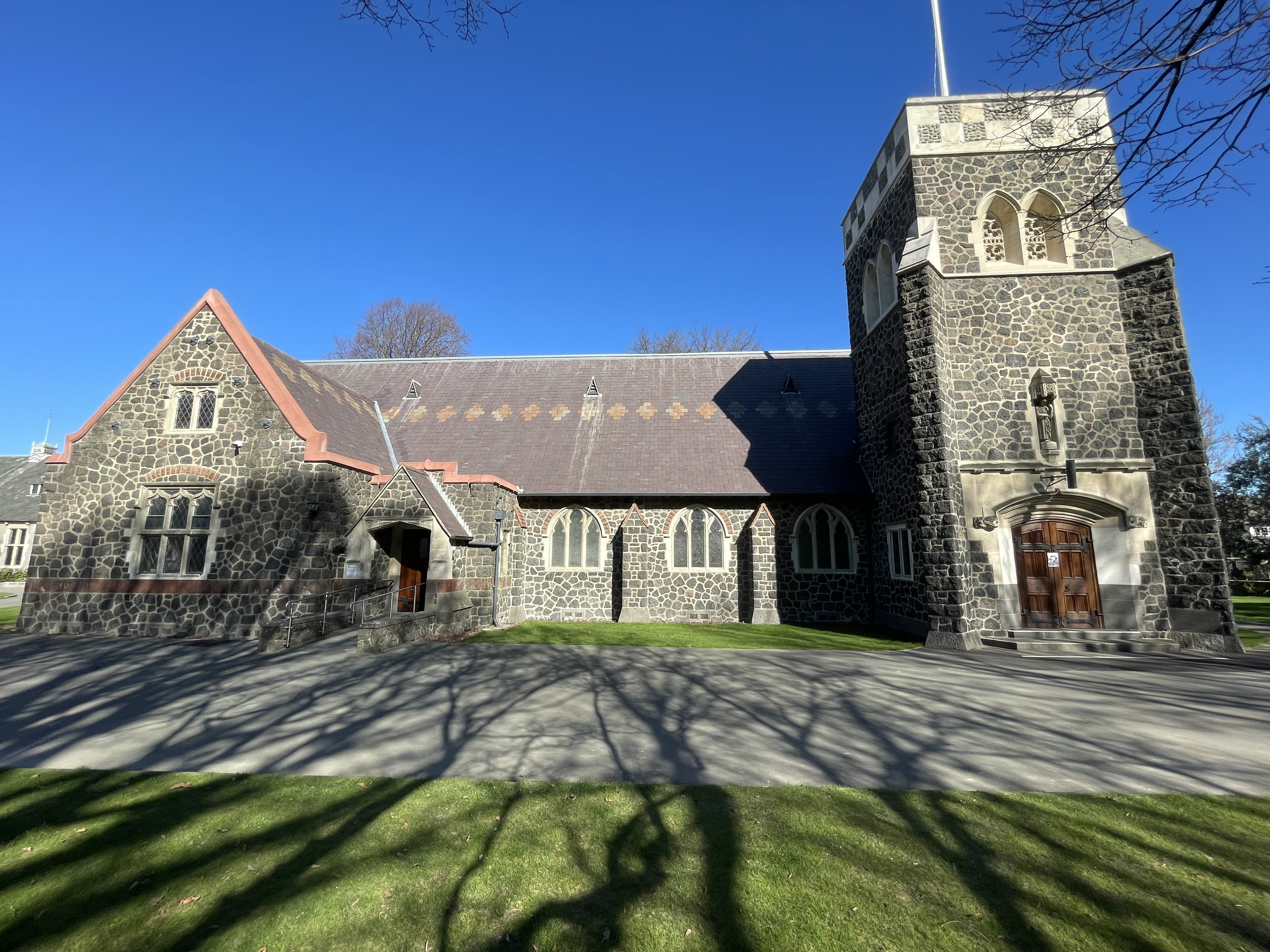
- St Barnabas Church in 2021
- St Barnabas Church
- 43.5195015°S 172.5965050°E
- Location: 8 Tui Street, Christchurch
- Address: 8 Tui Street, Fendalton, Christchurch 8052
- Country: New Zealand
- Denomination: Anglican
- Website: stbarnabas.org.nz

Architecture
- Architect: Cecil Wood
- Style: Arts and Crafts
- Years built: 1926

Administration
- Diocese: Diocese of Christchurch

Clergy
- Bishop: The Rt Rev’d Dr Peter R Carrell
- Vicar(s): Jenny Wilkens & Andrew Butcher

Heritage New Zealand – Category 1
- Designated: 2 April 1985
- Reference no.: 3681

St Barnabas Church is an Anglican church in Christchurch, New Zealand. It is registered as Category I by Heritage New Zealand.

== History ==
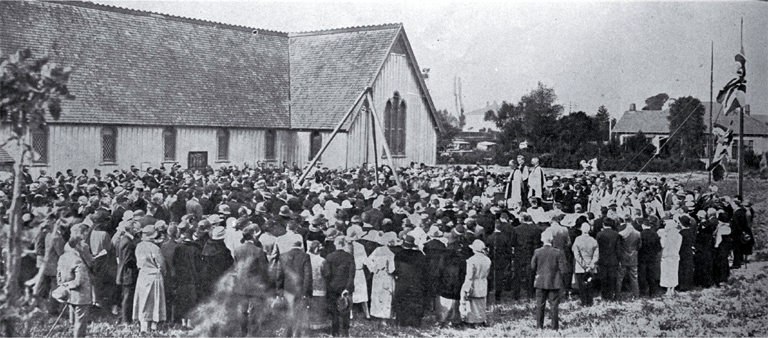
The laying of the foundation stone. The original wooden church is in the background.

The current stone church was designed to replace an earlier wooden church. The earlier wooden church was built in 1876. St Barnabas was originally part of St Peter's Riccarton and the parish of Riccarton. In 1883, Fendalton became its own parish and at this time the wooden church was enlarged. A new church built out of permanent materials was proposed in 1916. In 1918, the vicar at the time, Canon Thomas Hamilton, suggested that the church should be built as a memorial to those who died during World War I. Cecil Wood was chosen as the architect. Wood was known to be an admirer of the American architect Bertram Goodhue but he does not appear to have adopted any of Goodhue's common design elements other than the tabernacle at St Barnabas. The foundation stone was laid by Archbishop Julius in 1925. The new church was built one hundred feet behind the wooden church. On 20 November 1926 the Church was dedicated and consecrated by bishop Campbell West-Watson. It was registered as a historic place on 2 April 1985, with registration number 3681. The church has a longstanding relationship with Medbury School.

== Canterbury earthquakes and restoration ==
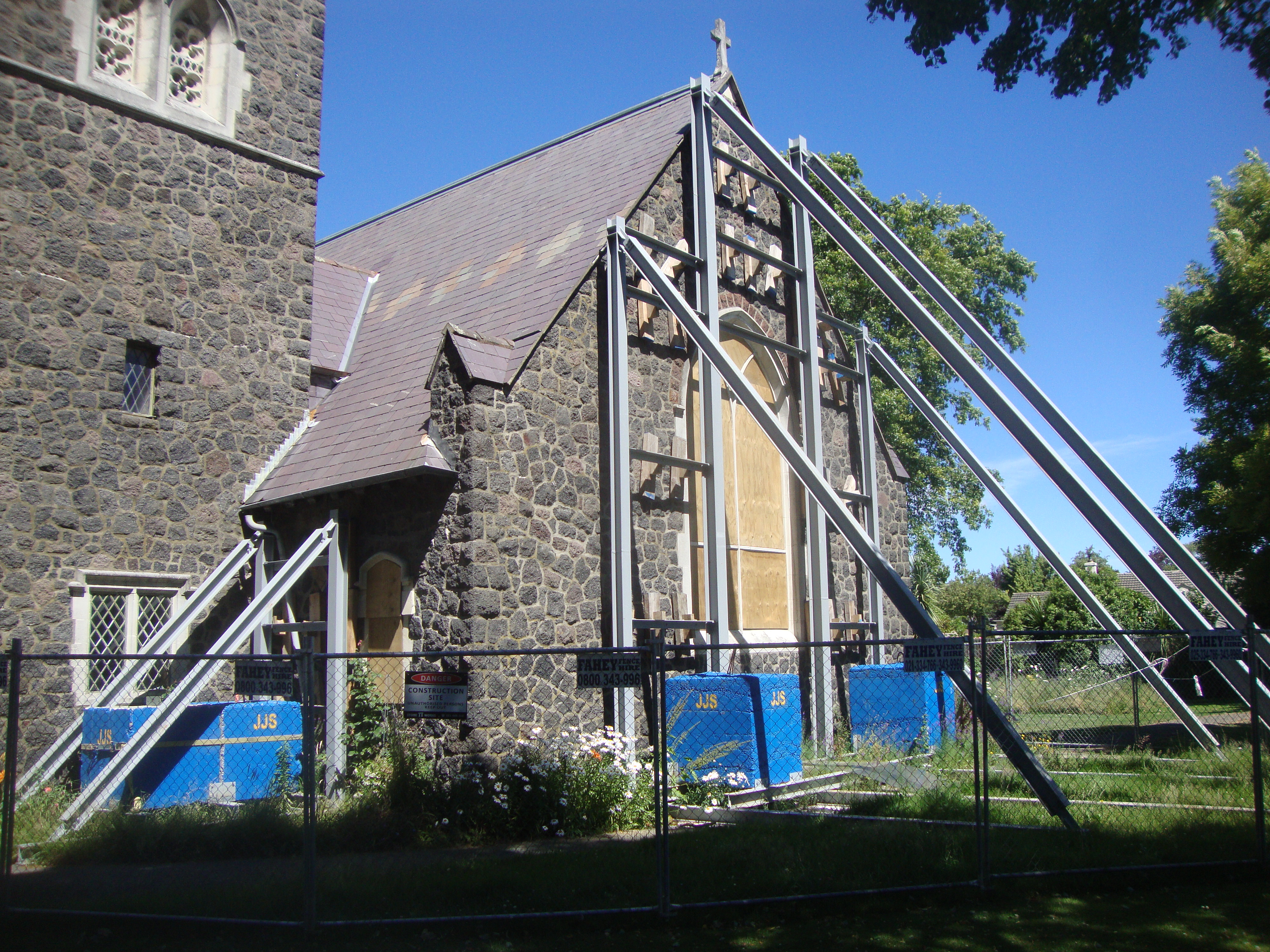
The north wall with supports after the 2011 earthquake

The church sustained damage during the February 2011 Christchurch earthquake and the June aftershock. The parish fundraised and also received funding from the Christchurch Earthquake Heritage Buildings Trust to restore the church and to strengthen the building up to 67% of the national building standard. The restored church was reopened by the Bishop of Christchurch, Victoria Matthews, on 19 February 2017. In February 2021 the St Barnabas Centre was reopened.
