= Edward Elworthy =

New Zealand farmer and businessman

Personal details
- Born: 30 January 1836 Somerset, England
- Died: 22 January 1899 (aged 62) South Canterbury, New Zealand
- Spouse: Sarah Shorrock
- Children: 11
- Profession: Farmer and businessman

Edward Elworthy (30 January 1836 – 22 January 1899) was a New Zealand farmer and businessman, and large landowner who at one point was estimated to have been one of the richest men in New Zealand.

== Early years ==
Elworthy was born in Wellington, Somerset, England, in 1836. He was the son of Jane Chorley and her husband, Thomas Elworthy, a woollen mill owner. He moved to Toowoomba, Australia, in 1860, at the age of 24 with the intention of settling in Queensland and making his living as a farmer, but when after several years of trying, this did not work out as planned, he then moved across the Tasman to the Timaru area in the South Island of New Zealand in 1864. Elworthy bought a large 42 000 acres (17 000 hectares) sheep run called Pareora, and the main property on this station and the place where Elworthy lived eventually came to be known as Holme Station. Holme Station, which was built as a farm manor in 1911 by the Elworthy family, after the original homestead burnt down and was replaced, was the heart of one of New Zealand's first and largest pioneer farms. Holme Station is located about 20 minutes inland from Timaru in South Canterbury and 2 hours 30 minutes south of Christchurch.

From the age of 28 when he arrived, Elworthy lived almost continuously on his land until his death in 1899.

== Career as farmer and businessman ==
Elworthy expanded the farm by aggressively acquiring neighbouring properties in the area inland from Timaru, and by 1872 he was running 46,000 sheep on 82,000 acres (33 000 hectares). Over the period 1864 to 1892, Elworthy expanded his land holdings significantly and by 1892 he and his family were the biggest land holders in all of South Canterbury.

Elworthy took a leading part in social, public and business matters in South Canterbury, serving at one time or another as chairman of the Waimate County Council and the Timaru Agricultural and Pastoral Association, and as founding director of the South Canterbury Refrigerating Company. He was also a member of the South Canterbury Acclimatisation Society and the South Canterbury Athletic Club. Horse-racing, steeplechasing and hunting were other interests.

A town house was maintained in Timaru, and on weekends the family would ride or travel by gig or trap into town in order to attend social functions and, of course, church on Sunday.

Edward Elworthy and his wife had a grand total of 11 children, four of whom died in infancy.

Of the 7 whom survived, there were three sons and four daughters.

Athur was the oldest of the three brothers and he sold land and moved to Christchurch. In 1900, Arthur married Ella Caroline Julius, the daughter of Churchill Julius who was the bishop of Christchurch. Churchill Julius was the second Bishop of Christchurch, NZ 1 May 1890 – 1925, Primate & First Archbishop of New Zealand 1902–1925. His biography A Power in the Land: Churchill Julius, 1847–1938, published 1971 was written by Anthony & Gertrude Elworthy. His youngest son, John Churchill Elworthy was a captain in the Royal New Zealand Navy and later a farmer.

Herbert was the middle brother. He was also the father of farmer and businessman Sir Peter Elworthy, former National Politician Jonathan Elworthy and writer David Elworthy who wrote a book with his wife about his grandfather, his life, and the life of his many descendants, called Edward's Legacy. The farm of Herbert Elworthy is called Craigmore and it remains in the family, now being run by leading New Zealand entrepreneur Forbes Elworthy who is the great-grandson of Edward Elworthy. Another great-grandson of Edward is Charles Elworthy, a leading New Zealand economist and social scientist.

Percy was the youngest of Edward's three sons and he was a farmer. He was also the father of Charles, Lord Elworthy who was a senior officer in the Royal Air Force both during and after World War 2. Elworthy was made a life peer as Lord Elworthy, of Timaru in New Zealand and of Elworthy in the County of Somerset, on 9 May 1972 and he was made Constable and Governor of Windsor Castle on 13 April 1971. He also became Lord Lieutenant of Greater London in 1973. He was the nephew of Edward Elworthy.

One of the great-great-grandsons of Edward Elworthy is Simon Maling, whose mother is an Elworthy and who played 11 tests as a lock for the New Zealand All Blacks in the late 1990s and early 2000s.

== Later life ==
Elworthy suffered from ill health in his later life and he died in 1899, a few days before his 63rd birthday.

After his death on 22 January 1899 from a heart attack, the land was divided among his three sons, Arthur, Herbert and Percy. By 1914 a substantial proportion of the original freehold land had been sold.

His wife, Sara, lived until 1933.

== Legacy ==
In 2000, Elworthy was posthumously inducted into the New Zealand Business Hall of Fame.

The Holme Station homestead, in which Elworthy descendants lived for much of their lives, was rebuilt and completed in 1912 after the original one burnt down in the 1910, still stands today and in 2009 it was the venue for a large Elworthy reunion featuring the Elworthy Family Reunion over one hundred of his descendants, some of whom had come from all over the world for the reunion.

The property, Holme Station Homestead has been fully renovated and has recently launched as South Canterbury's first and only Luxury Lodge. It is welcoming guests from May 2026.
