= Awdry Julius =

English clergyman (1874–1956)

John Awdry Julius
- Born: 1874; Norwich, Norfolk, England
- Died: 18 July 1956 (aged 81–82)
- Education: Melbourne Grammar School, Christ's College, Christchurch and Keble College, Oxford
- Occupation: Dean of Christchurch
- Parents: Churchill Julius (father); Alice Julius (mother)
- Relatives: George Julius (brother)

John Awdry Julius (1874–1956) was Dean of Christchurch from 1927 to 1940.

He was born in Norwich and educated at Melbourne Grammar School, Christ's College, Christchurch and Keble College, Oxford. He was ordained deacon in 1897 and priest in 1898. and began his ecclesiastical career with a curacy in Kettering. Emigrating to New Zealand, he was Vicar of Papanui, (1904–14); then Waimate, (1914–20); and Timaru, (1921–27). As well as his position as dean he was Archdeacon of Timaru, (1922–27); Rangiora, (1928–34); and Christchurch, (1934–37).

Awdry was the son of Churchill Julius and Alice Julius, and brother of George Julius. He died on 18 July 1956.
