= Peter Elworthy =

New Zealand farmer and businessman (1935–2004)

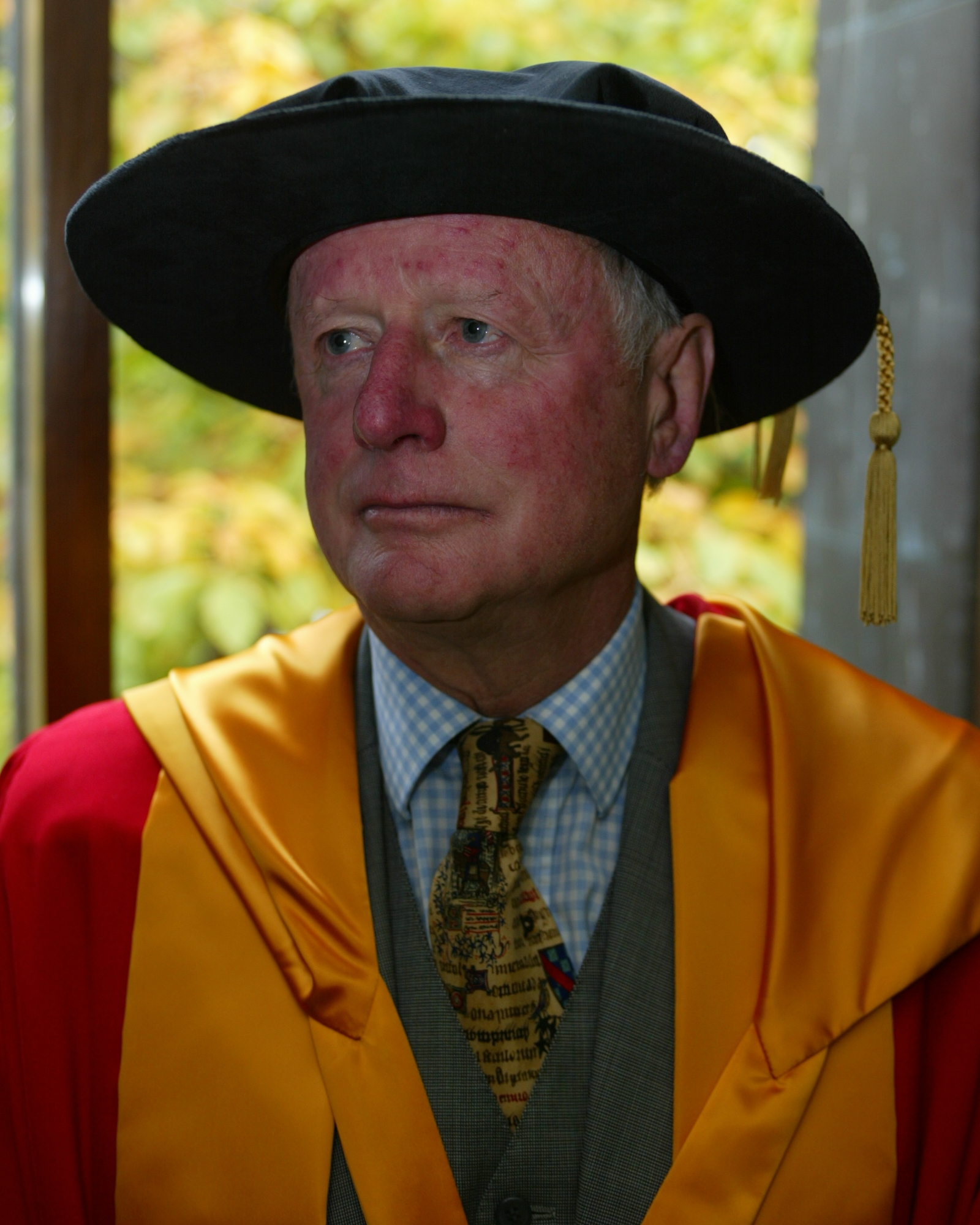
Elworthy in 2002

Sir Peter Herbert Elworthy (3 March 1935 – 11 January 2004) was a New Zealand farmer and businessman who came from an established South Canterbury farming family.

== Early life and family ==
Born in Timaru on 3 March 1935, Elworthy was the son of June Mary Elworthy (née Batchelor) and Harold Herbert Elworthy, and the grandson of Edward Elworthy. He had two brothers, Jonathan Elworthy, a New Zealand politician, and David Elworthy, a publisher.

Peter Elworthy was educated at Christ's College from 1949 to 1953, and then completed a diploma at Canterbury Agricultural College in 1955.

In 1960, Elworthy married Fiona Elizabeth McHardy, and the couple went on to have four children, including economist and social scientist Charles Elworthy.

== Career ==
Elworthy began his career as a farmer, and in 1971 he won a Nuffield New Zealand farming scholarship to the United Kingdom, where he studied British farmer cooperatives and agricultural politics. He was founding president of the New Zealand Deer Farmers' Association between 1974 and 1981, and served as president of Federated Farmers from 1984 to 1988, a period that included the market reforms of the fourth Labour government. From 1988 to 1989, he chaired the New Zealand Rural Trust, and was chairman of the Queen Elizabeth II National Trust between 1987 and 1992.

In the business sector, Elworthy held numerous company directorships, including Ravensdown Fertiliser Co-operative (1977–1982), Huttons Kiwi Ltd, BP New Zealand Ltd, Reserve Bank of New Zealand, Skycity Entertainment Group, Port of Timaru Ltd, and Skellerup. He was a member of the Institute of Directors.

In 1993 he was a founding member of the Association of Consumers and Taxpayers, a political group that grew into ACT New Zealand.

== Hobbies ==
Elworthy owned a Tiger Moth aeroplane, which he used to fly around New Zealand.

== Honours and awards ==
In 1987, Elworthy received the Bledisloe Medal for agriculture from Lincoln College. In the 1988 Queen's Birthday Honours, he was appointed a Knight Bachelor, for services to agriculture. In 1990, he was awarded the New Zealand 1990 Commemoration Medal.

In 2004, Elworthy was posthumously inducted into the New Zealand Business Hall of Fame.

== Death ==
On 11 January 2004, Elworthy died suddenly of a heart attack early in the morning. He was survived by his wife and their four children.
