= George Macdonald (historian) =

New Zealand farmer and historian

George Ranald Macdonald MC (4 October 1891 – 13 December 1967) was a New Zealand farmer and historian. He compiled the G R MacDonald Dictionary of Canterbury Biographies, a collection of 12,000 biographies held by the Canterbury Museum. The entire dictionary has been digitised and is available through Canterbury Museum's website.

== Biography ==
Macdonald was born in the Christchurch suburb of St Albans in 1891. His parents were Gertrude Gould and Ranald Macintosh Macdonald, and George Gould was his uncle. He attended school at French Farm on Banks Peninsula, and Christ's College in Christchurch. He was then sent to study history at Christ Church College at the University of Oxford in England, from where he graduated with a Bachelor of Arts in 1912, and a Master of Arts in 1919. He was a qualified lawyer but rarely practised in that profession. His education was interrupted by World War I, where he saw active service for the British Army after having been rejected by New Zealand forces due to his poor eyesight. After various assignments, he was with the Royal Tank Corps, was wounded on three occasions, and received the Military Cross in January 1919. His citation reads:

For conspicuous gallantry and devotion to duty. This officer, though wounded shortly after zero hours, continued to supervise the carrying-up of supplies to the battalion with which he was working, in one case reconnoitring a village which was still occupied by the enemy. He refused to be medically treated until his section was withdrawn.

When back in New Zealand, he married Beatrice Mary (Wina) Clifford of Stonyhurst Station at Waipara on 14 February 1922; they were to have four sons. She was the granddaughter of Sir Charles Clifford, 1st Baronet, one of the station's founders. His first farming venture failed. When his father died in 1928, he inherited Lowry Hills near Cheviot. Disillusioned with farming, he sold his farm, bought another, and then retired to Woodend.

In his retirement and encouraged by his friend, Roger Duff, Macdonald compiled the G R MacDonald Dictionary of Canterbury Biographies, a collection of 12,000 biographies held by the Canterbury Museum.
