= George Gould (businessman) =

New Zealand farmer and businessman

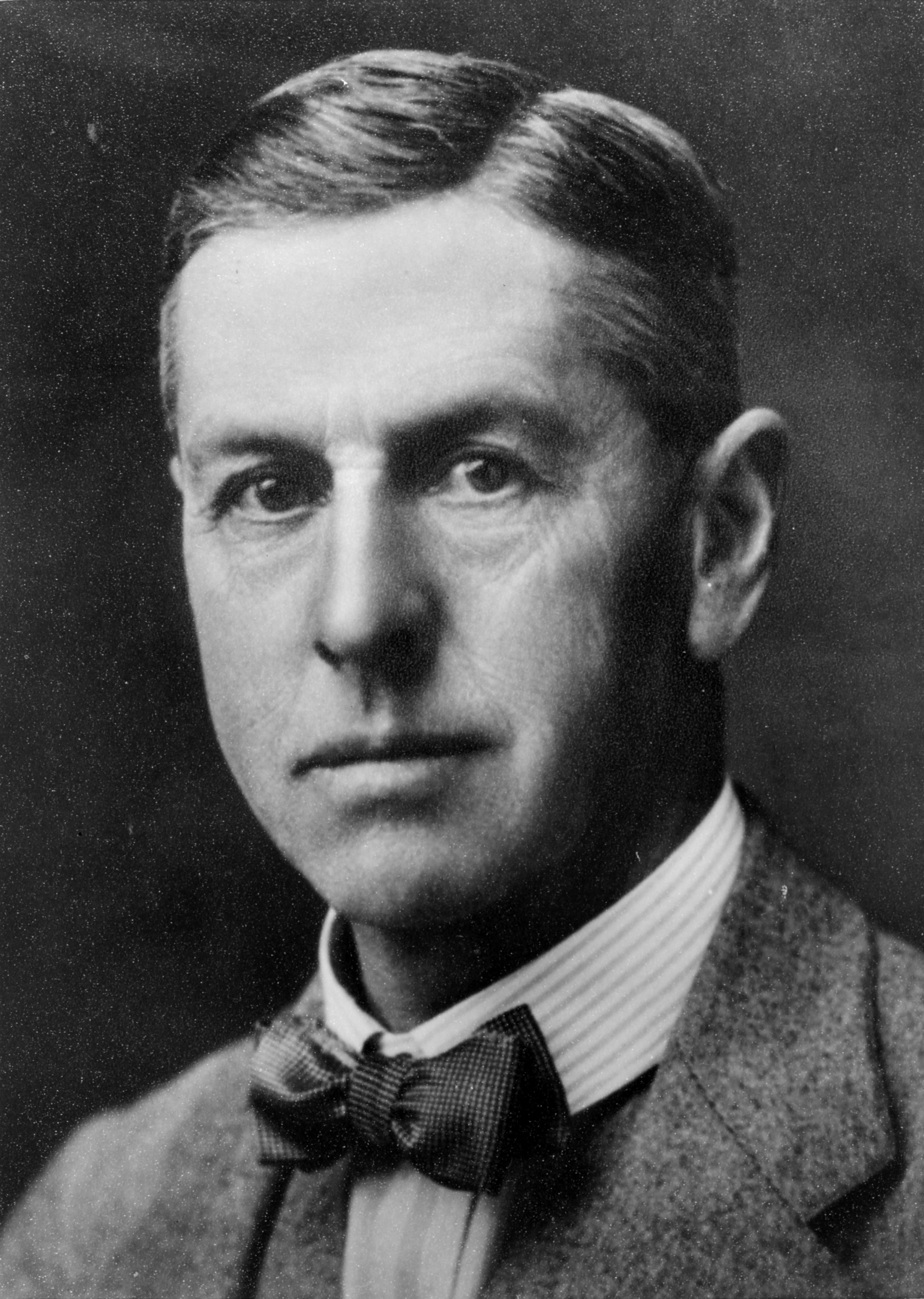
George Gould, c. 1923

George Gould (6 April 1865 – 26 May 1941) was a New Zealand farmer, businessman, stock breeder, racehorse owner and breeder, and racing administrator. He was born in Christchurch, New Zealand on 6 April 1865. His father (1823–1889), a prominent businessman, had the same name. He was the uncle of George Macdonald. He was the grandfather of British politician, Bryan Gould.

He was chairman of the New Zealand Shipping Company for some time. In 1929, he proposed a variety of measures to relieve traffic congestion in Colombo Street and Cathedral Square, including a new bridge over the Avon River / Ōtākaro connecting Oxford Terrace with Durham Street south, and a new diagonal street from the Armagh Street / Manchester Street intersection to Gloucester Street near its intersection with Colombo Street. The latter proposal would have required the demolition of the Colosseum. Gould suggested this diagonal street be called Little High Street, in reference to the diagonal High Street further south in the central city. Only two weeks after Gould's proposal, a group of businessman led by Arthur Francis Stacey put a proposal for a new street with a Spanish theme to Christchurch City Council's town planning committee. The group had secured options on the Colosseum and on those two properties that separated the Colosseum from access onto Armagh Street. New Regent Street is what came from Stacey's proposal.

He died on 26 May 1941 in Christchurch. His sister Mabel, the widow of the Hon. Henry A. Hannen (himself the son of James Hannen, Baron Hannen), died in the same week.
