= Charles Elworthy (scientist) =

New Zealand economist and social scientist (1961–2023)

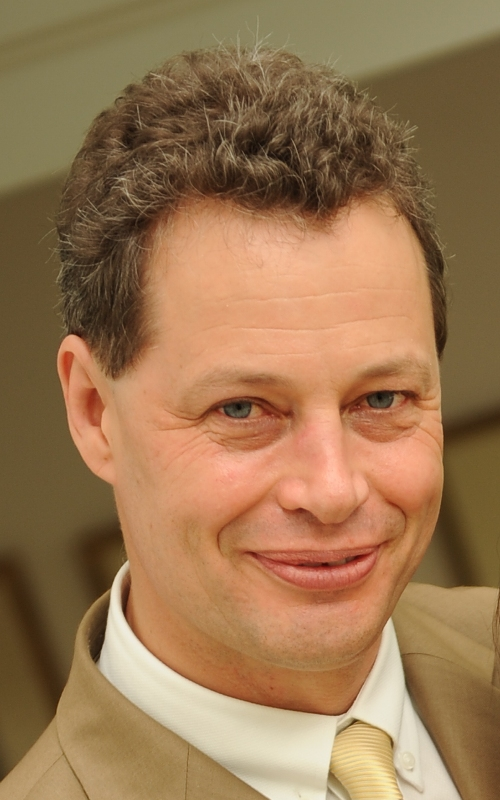
- Elworthy in 2010
- Born: Charles Herbert Elworthy; 5 November 1961; Timaru, New Zealand
- Died: 8 June 2023 (aged 61); Oxford, Oxfordshire, England
- Spouse: Sununtha Vaidyanuvatti
- Relatives: Peter Elworthy (father); Jonathan Elworthy (uncle)

Academic background
- Education: Free University of Berlin
- Thesis: Homo biologicus: an evolutionary model for the human sciences (1991)

Charles Herbert Elworthy (5 November 1961 – 8 June 2023) was a New Zealand economist and social scientist.

== Early life and family ==
Elworthy was born in Timaru on 5 November 1961, one of four children of Fiona Elizabeth Elworthy (née McHardy) and Peter Herbert Elworthy.

== Academic and professional activities ==
Elworthy was a visiting business fellow at the Smith School of Enterprise and the Environment at the University of Oxford, and the head of research at the Map of Agriculture. He taught as a professor at Chulalongkorn University (Thailand) and the University of Szczecin (Poland), and was a privatdozent at the Free University of Berlin (Germany).

Elworthy's research approach was fundamentally shaped while at Cambridge through Douglass North’s supervisions on the New Institutional Economics. This was complemented by an introduction to alternative psychological models and their implications for political behaviour and international relations at Yale. These foundations were combined in his doctoral research on the evolutionary foundations of human behaviour and his later work on the interaction between governance structures and behaviour.

In his dissertation, published in 1993 in Berlin, Elworthy created the model of Homo biologicus which explains human behaviour in terms of evolutionary theory and phylogenetic and ontogenetic development. Homo biologicus is linked to, but extends, the economic Homo economicus model, which describes man as a rational and self-interested being. The core hypothesis is derived from evolutionary psychology, and proposes that human psychological processes were shaped by natural and sexual selection to solve evolutionarily relevant problems. Some of these relate to somatic effort, and are economic in nature, while others relate to reproductive and social behaviour which are inexplicable within a conventional Homo economicus paradigm. Elworthy's theory stands in the tradition of authors like E. O. Wilson or Richard Dawkins, who are controversial among social scientists and frequently criticised for their alleged biologism. In later academic work, Elworthy examines the interactions between social institutions and human psychology and the behaviour that results. His habilitation analyses constitutional developments in New Zealand, and their enabling role in the dramatic liberalisation from 1984 to 1993.

Elworthy's later research concentrated on the governance and usage of natural resources. Elworthy was involved in the creation a "Map of Agriculture", a GIS application which provides financial returns, production yields and environmental information about agriculture around the world.

== Other ==
Following his experience at the COP15 Copenhagen climate conference, Elworthy established the Bhuu organisation as an example of ecological entrepreneurship. The objective was to develop simple devices that transmitted environmental measurements to a central database via the internet. The intention was that the data could then be visualised and analysed and made available to both the original collectors and the general public. The Bhuu initiative itself was overtaken by other technologies, but the intention of providing better economic and environmental information to enable better decision-making remained part of Elworthy's objectives.

Elworthy was the director of the European Academy charitable organisation in Schloss Wartin. The Collegium Wartinum Foundation supports the preservation of this manor house and its use as a cultural, artistic, and scientific centre in the Uckermark.

== Death ==
Elworthy died at a hospice in Oxford, England, on 8 June 2023, at the age of 61.

== Selected publications ==
- van Beers, Rik, Sander Bierman, Charles Elworthy, Dane Rook and Jérôme Schoumann "Farmland investment: Reaping the rewards of illiquidity?" VBA beleggingsprofessionals, Nr 114 (Summer 2013).
- Elworthy, Charles: Homo Biologicus: An Evolutionary Model for the Human Sciences. Duncker & Humblot, Berlin 1993, ISBN 3-428-07749-0
- Elworthy, Charles: The Reciprocal Influence of Institutions and Policies: The Evolution of Governance Structures in New Zealand, 1840–1993 Habilitationsshrift, Otto Suhr Institut für Politikwissenschaft, Freie Universität Berlin. February 2001.
- Elworthy, Charles: Evolutionary Psychology. The Appropriate Disciplinary Link between Evolutionary Theory and the Social Sciences. In: Dennen/Smillie/Wilson (eds.): The Darwinian Heritage and Sociobiology. Praeger, Westport 1999, ISBN 0-275-96436-1
