= George Julius =

New Zealand inventor and entrepreneur (1873-1946)

Sir George Julius
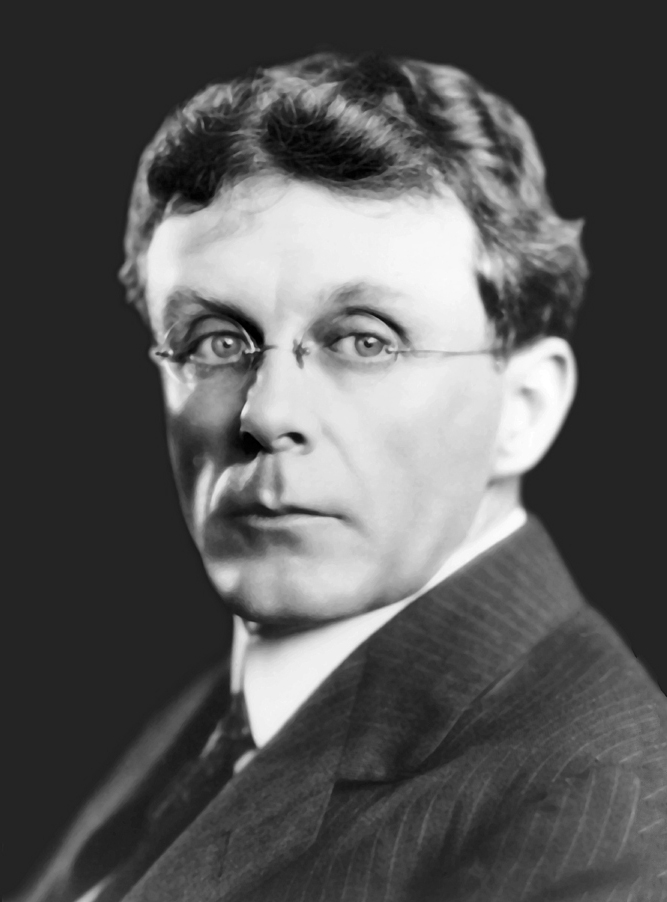

Chairman of the CSIRO
- In office 1 April 1926 – 31 December 1945
- Preceded by: Office established
- Succeeded by: David Rivett

Personal details
- Born: George Alfred Julius; 29 April 1873 Norwich, Norfolk, England
- Died: 28 June 1946 (aged 73)
- Spouse: Lady Eva Julius
- Parent(s): Churchill Julius, Bishop of Christchurch, Archbishop of New Zealand
- Education: Christchurch College, Christchurch, New Zealand
- Occupation: Mechanical engineer

Sir George Alfred Julius (29 April 1873 – 28 June 1946) was an English-born New Zealand inventor and entrepreneur. He was the founder of Julius Poole & Gibson Pty Ltd and Automatic Totalisators Ltd, and invented the world's first automatic totalisator.

== Early years ==
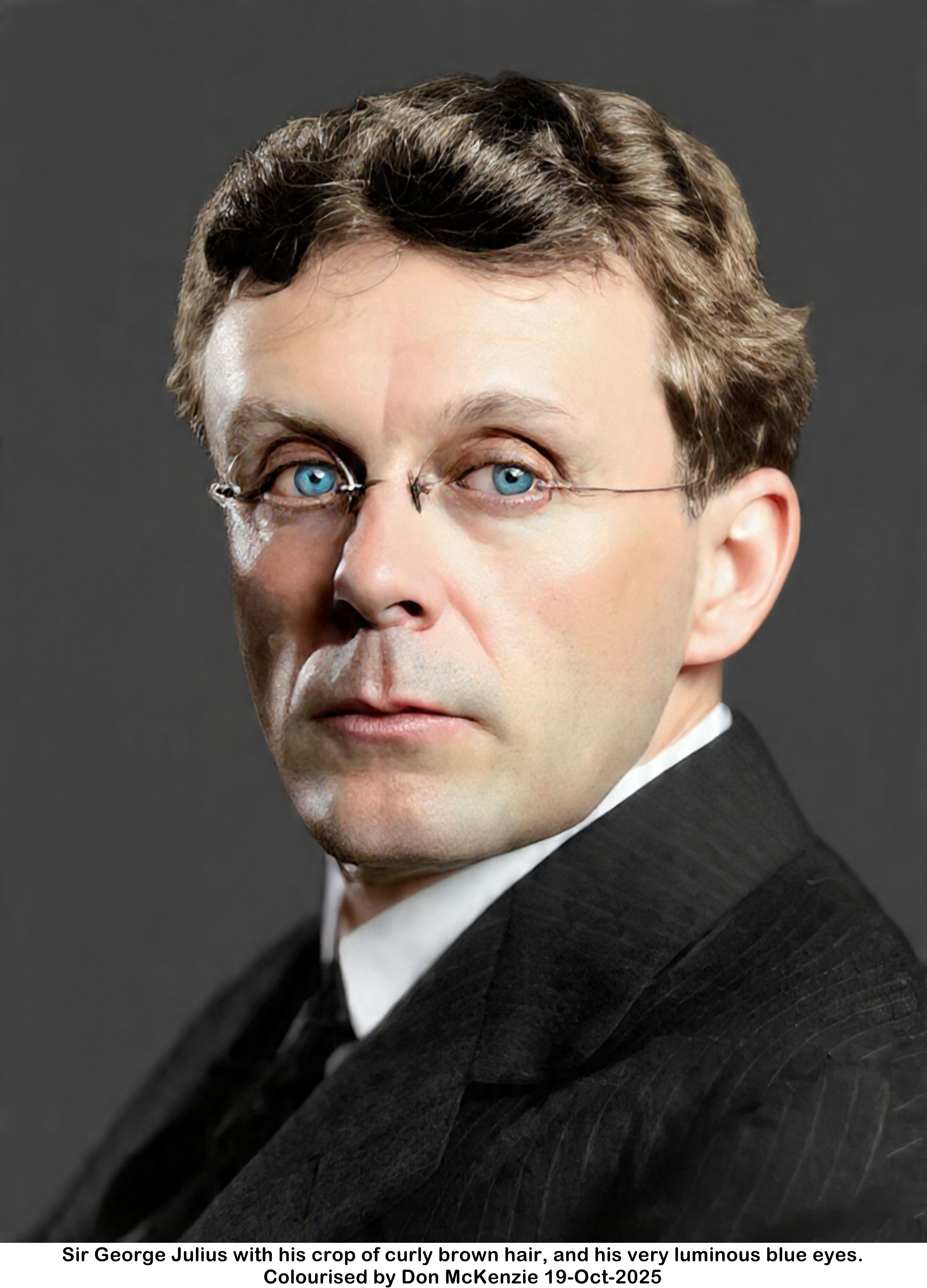
George Julius, Australia's Father Of Scientific & Industrial Research

George Alfred Julius was born in a small house in Bethel Street, Norwich, England, (demolished in the 1930s to make way for the new City Hall). At that time his father, Churchill Julius (1847–1938), was a curate at St. Giles in Norwich; his mother was Alice Julius. In 1873 the family moved firstly to the parishes of South Brent (now known as Brent Knoll) and thereafter to Shapwick and Ashcott in Somerset. Later, Churchill Julius became vicar of Holy Trinity, Islington, London; he subsequently accepted the appointment as Archdeacon of Ballarat, Australia, and it was here that the family travelled on the sailing ship South Australian in 1884. From an early age, George's mechanical inclination was obvious to his parents and he often helped his father to fix clocks, one of which survives (now decommissioned) in the tower at St. Michael's, Brent Knoll, although George would have been too young to have assisted with this particular repair.

The family moved to New Zealand when Churchill Julius was nominated to the Diocese of Christchurch in 1889; he was consecrated (first) Bishop of Christchurch in 1890, and made Anglican Primate and (first) Archbishop of New Zealand in 1922.

In 1890, George Julius enrolled in a BSc (Mechanical Engineering) degree course at Canterbury College. Because of the contemporary boom in railway construction, he specialised in railway engineering and was the first such engineering student to graduate from this university, at the same time as Ernest Rutherford, graduating through the University of New Zealand.

== Early career and the totalisator ==
Julius's professional career began in 1896. He travelled to Western Australia to accept an appointment as assistant engineer on the staff of the Locomotive Department of the Western Australian Government Railways (WAGR). He worked for the WAGR for eleven years and was promoted to chief draughtsman and then engineer in charge of tests.

While working for the WAGR, Julius conducted a series of tests on timber and wrote two learned papers on Western Australian hardwoods. This research led to a job offer from Allen Taylor & Company, a timber company in Sydney, as part-time engineer that Julius accepted in 1907.

In whatever spare time he had, George Julius worked on the design for an automatic totalisator. Helped by two of his sons, he built a prototype. However, the automatic totalisator was not originally conceived as a betting machine, but as a mechanical vote-counting machine. When the government rejected the voting machine concept, Julius adapted it as a racecourse totalisator. The first installation of the totalisator was at Ellerslie Racecourse, Auckland, New Zealand in 1913, which was entirely manual in operation, and the second at Gloucester Park Racetrack in Western Australia, electrically driven. The patent was lodged on 21 December 1914. Subsequent orders kept the firm of Julius, Poole & Gibson solvent throughout the Great Depression, with the first UK installation in 1928, for greyhound racing and in 1932 the first American installation at Hialeah Park, Florida.

== Career progression ==
One of the great contributions made by George Julius to the advancement of Australian technology resulted from his appointment, in 1926, as chairman to the Council for Scientific and Industrial Research (CSIR). This later became the Commonwealth Scientific and Industrial Research Organisation (CSIRO), modelled on the UK's DSIR. He lobbied for development of primary production and solution to issues in such areas as food storage and food preservation. Later, he turned his attention to issues in secondary production such as aeronautics and electronics. During World War II, he served on the Central Inventions Board, the Australian Council for Aeronautics (as chairman) and the Army Inventions Directorate.

George Julius was knighted in the 1929 New Years Honours List. He remained active as a committee representative until his death on 28 June 1946.

== Family and legacy ==
In 1898, he married Eva O'Connor (1878-1972), daughter of Charles Yelverton O'Connor. They had three sons.

The eldest, Awdry Francis Julius (born 1900), was later to become a partner in his father's firm.

Another, George Yelverton Julius, was known as "Gentleman George". However, he brought his good upbringing into a life of crime. In 1953 he went to jail for eight years for burglary. He was the father of Wendy Whiteley, wife of the Australian painter Brett Whiteley, and his granddaughter was Arkie Whiteley.

A third son, Roderick Herbert Julius, died during a flight around Australia in a single-seater aeroplane in 1939.

A road in the grounds of the CSIRO headquarters in Canberra is named in his honour along with a street in the Canberra suburb of Pearce.
