= Churchill Julius =

The Most Reverend Churchill Julius
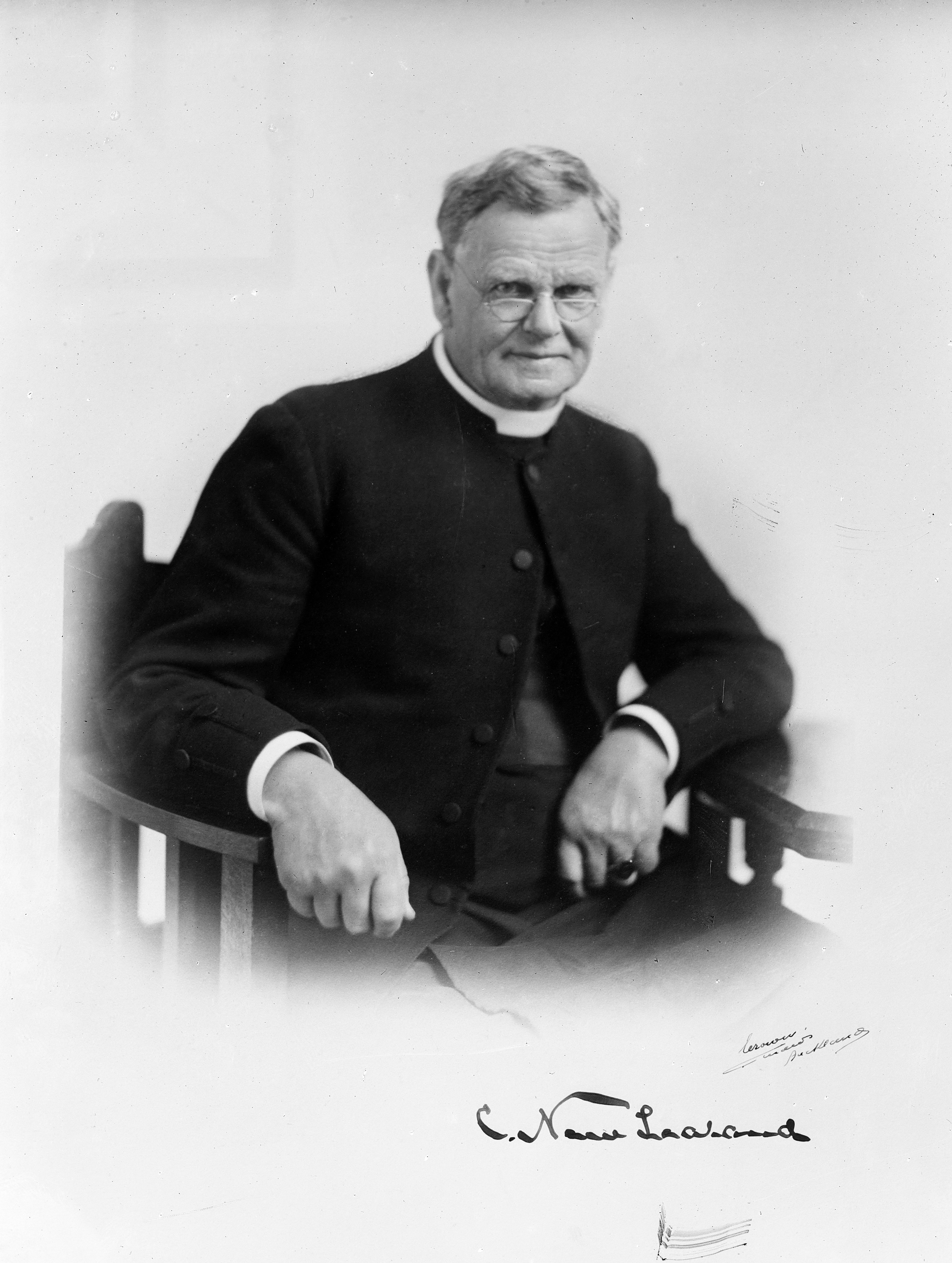
- Julius in 1922

Personal details
- Born: 15 October 1847 Richmond, London, England
- Died: 1 September 1938 (aged 90) Christchurch, New Zealand
- Buried: Linwood Cemetery
- Spouse: Alice Rowlandson
- Children: 7
- Occupation: Archbishop of New Zealand

Churchill Julius (15 October 1847 – 1 September 1938) was an Anglican cleric in England, then in Australia and New Zealand, becoming the first Archbishop of New Zealand.

== Biography ==
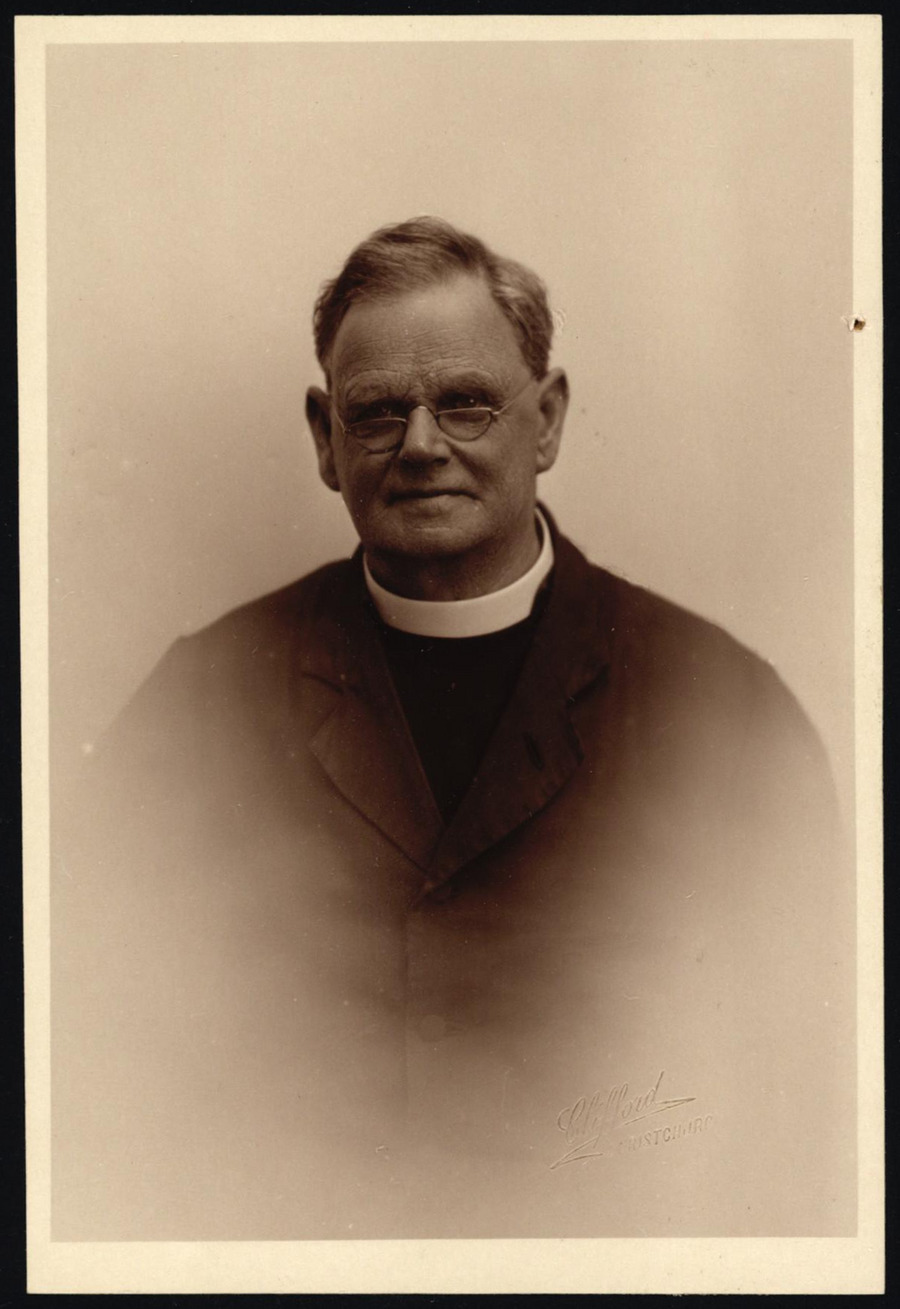
Churchill Julius passport photo (1925)

Julius was born at Richmond, London in 1847. He was educated at King's College London and Worcester College, Oxford, where he graduated BA in 1869 and MA in 1871. He was ordained a deacon in 1871 and priest in 1872. He was Curate, firstly at St Giles' Church, Norwich (1871) and subsequently at St. Michael's, South Brent, Somerset (subsequently renamed "Brent Knoll" to avoid confusion with the village of the same name in Devonshire). Julius then became Vicar at St. Mary's, Shapwick, Somerset, a post retained until 1878 and following which he was appointed to the cure of Holy Trinity, Islington. In 1884 he left England for Australia to become Archdeacon for the diocese of Ballarat, Victoria, a post he held until 1890.

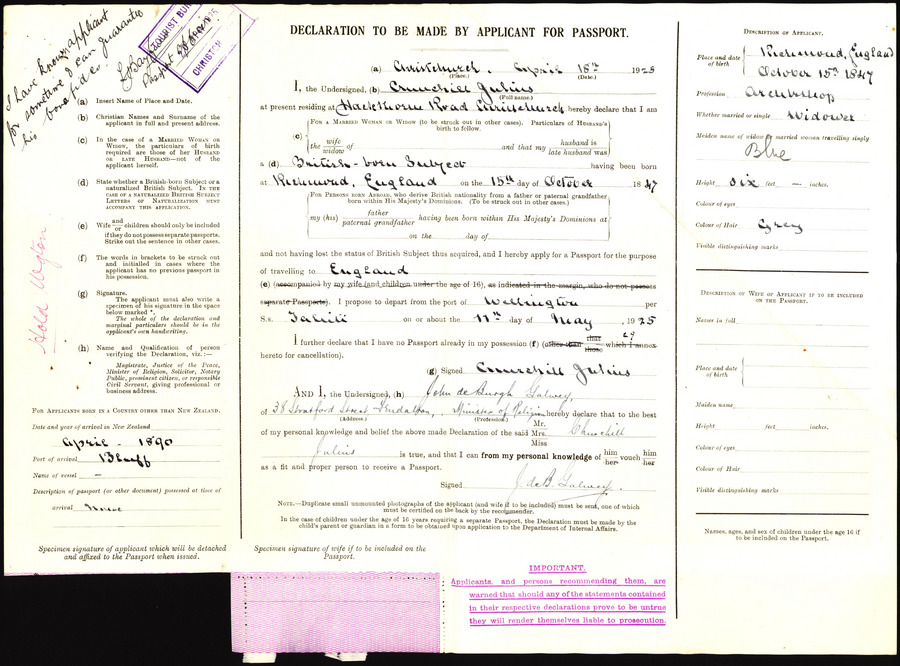
Churchill Julius passport application (1925)

In 1889 he was nominated to the Diocese of Christchurch, New Zealand, and became the second Bishop of Christchurch in 1890. He was active in completing the Christchurch Cathedral, and in support for education, which is remembered in the Bishop Julius Hostel for women students. In 1922, he was made the first Primate and Archbishop of New Zealand. He retired in 1925.

== Personal ==
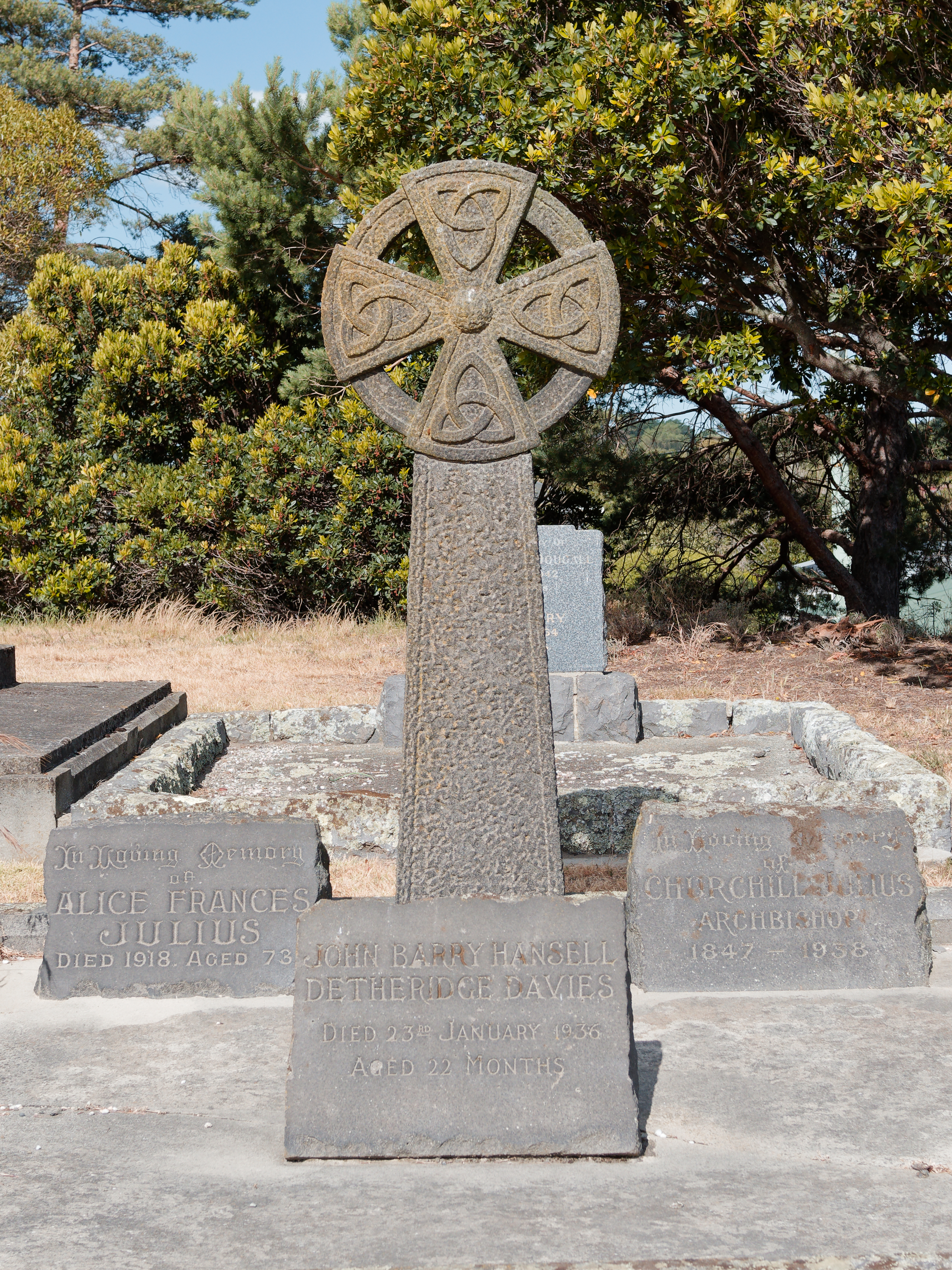
Gravestones of Archbishop Churchill Julius, his wife Alice, and a child named John Davies

Churchill Julius was born in Richmond Palace, Surrey, England in 1847, one of two sons born to Dr Frederic Gilder Julius (the President of the Church Association and whose father had been doctor to King William IV) and Ellen Hannah Smith. He died in Christchurch, New Zealand, in 1938. He married Alice Rowlandson in 1873; they had five daughters (two of whom, Ella and Bertha, married two brothers, Arthur and Percy of the Elworthy family) and two sons; Awdry who went into the Church in New Zealand (he became Archdeacon of Timaru) and George. George (later Dr Sir George Julius) became a distinguished engineer and prolific inventor of, inter alia, the Totalisator (for racecourse betting) who spent the bulk of his life in Australia.

Julius died on 1 September 1938 and was buried at Linwood Cemetery two days later.

Anglican Communion titles
Preceded by Henry Harper	Bishop of Christchurch; 1890–1925	Succeeded by Campbell West-Watson
