= Women in the Western Australian Legislative Assembly =

Women in politics in Western Australia

There have been 66 women in the Western Australian Legislative Assembly since its establishment in 1890. Women have had the right to vote since 1899 and the right to stand as candidates since 1920.

The first successful female candidate for the Legislative Assembly was Edith Cowan, who was elected as the member for West Perth in 1921 representing the Nationalist Party of Australia. This was the first time a woman had won election anywhere in Australia. Cowan was defeated in 1924 but in 1925 May Holman was elected to the seat of Forrest in a by-election, becoming the first successful Labor woman in Australia. Holman was joined by Florence Cardell-Oliver of the Nationalist Party in 1936, who would become the first female cabinet minister. Cardell-Oliver's retirement in 1956 led to a period of absence for women, until June Craig of the Liberal Party was elected in 1974, since which time women have been continuously represented in the Assembly.

Hilda Turnbull was the first National Party woman elected to the Assembly in 1989, and only two women – Liz Constable (1991–2013) and Janet Woollard (2001–2013) – have been elected as independents. Adele Carles became the first Greens member of the Assembly in 2009, although she later quit the party. Carol Martin was the first Indigenous woman elected to the Assembly in 2001.

== List of women in the Western Australian Legislative Assembly ==
Names in bold indicate women who have been appointed as Ministers and Parliamentary Secretaries during their time in Parliament. Names in italics indicate women who were first elected at a by-election. An asterisk (*) indicates that the member also served in the Legislative Council.

#	Name	Party	Electoral Division	Period of service
1	Edith Cowan	Nationalist	West Perth	12 March 1921 – 22 March 1924 (defeated)
2	May Holman	Labor	Forrest	3 April 1925 – 18 March 1939 (died)
3	**Florence Cardell-Oliver**	Nationalist/Liberal	Subiaco	15 February 1936 – 7 April 1956 (retired)
4	**June Craig**	Liberal	Wellington	30 March 1974 – 19 February 1983 (defeated)
5	**Pam Beggs**	Labor	Whitford	19 February 1983 – 6 February 1993 (defeated)
5	**Pam Buchanan**	Labor/Independent	Pilbara; Ashburton	19 February 1983 – 4 February 1989; 4 February 1989 – 3 March 1992
5	**Yvonne Henderson**	Labor	Gosnells; Thornlie	19 February 1983 – 4 February 1989; 4 February 1989 – 14 December 1996 (retired)
5	Jackie Watkins	Labor	Joondalup; Wanneroo	19 February 1983 – 4 February 1989; 4 February 1989 – 6 February 1993 (defeated)
9	**Carmen Lawrence**	Labor	Subiaco; Glendalough	8 February 1986 – 4 February 1989; 4 February 1989 – 14 February 1994 (resigned to contest HoR)
9	**Judyth Watson**	Labor	Canning; Kenwick	8 February 1986 – 4 February 1989; 4 February 1989 – 14 December 1996 (defeated)
11	**Cheryl Edwardes**	Liberal	Kingsley	4 February 1989 – 26 February 2005 (retired)
11	Hilda Turnbull	National	Collie	4 February 1989 – 10 February 2001 (defeated)
13	**Judy Edwards**	Labor	Maylands	26 May 1990 – 6 September 2008 (retired)
14	**Liz Constable**	Independent	Floreat; Churchlands	20 July 1991 – 14 December 1996; 14 December 1996 – 9 March 2013 (retired)
15	**Kay Hallahan***	Labor	Armadale	6 February 1993 – 14 December 1996 (retired)
15	**June van de Klashorst**	Liberal	Swan Hills	6 February 1993 – 10 February 2001 (defeated)
15	Diana Warnock	Labor	Perth	6 February 1993 – 10 February 2001 (retired)
18	**Michelle Roberts**	Labor	Glendalough; Midland	19 March 1994 – 14 December 1996; 14 December 1996 – 8 March 2025 (retired)
19	**Rhonda Parker**	Liberal	Helena; Ballajura	10 September 1994 – 14 December 1996; 14 December 1996 – 10 February 2001 (defeated)
20	Megan Anwyl	Labor	Kalgoorlie	14 December 1996 – 10 February 2001 (defeated)
20	**Katie Hodson-Thomas**	Liberal	Carine	14 December 1996 – 6 September 2008 (retired)
20	Monica Holmes	Liberal	Southern River	14 December 1996 – 10 February 2001 (defeated)
20	**Alannah MacTiernan***	Labor	Armadale	14 December 1996 – 19 July 2010 (resigned to contest HoR)
20	**Sheila McHale**	Labor	Thornlie	14 December 1996 – 6 September 2008 (retired)
25	Dianne Guise	Labor	Wanneroo	10 February 2001 – 6 September 2008 (defeated)
25	Carol Martin	Labor	Kimberley	10 February 2001 – 9 March 2013 (retired)
25	**Margaret Quirk**	Labor	Girrawheen; Landsdale	10 February 2001 – 13 March 2021; 13 March 2021 – 8 March 2025 (retired)
25	**Jaye Radisich**	Labor	Swan Hills	10 February 2001 – 6 September 2008 (retired)
25	Sue Walker	Liberal/Independent	Nedlands	10 February 2001 – 6 September 2008 (defeated)
25	Janet Woollard	Independent	Alfred Cove	10 February 2001 – 9 March 2013 (defeated)
31	Judy Hughes	Labor	Kingsley	26 February 2005 – 6 September 2008 (defeated)
32	Lisa Baker	Labor	Maylands	6 September 2008 – 8 March 2025 (retired)
32	Janine Freeman	Labor	Nollamara	6 September 2008 – 29 January 2021 (retired)
32	**Liza Harvey**	Liberal	Scarborough	6 September 2008 – 13 March 2021 (defeated)
32	**Andrea Mitchell**	Liberal	Kingsley	6 September 2008 – 11 March 2017 (defeated)
32	**Rita Saffioti**	Labor	West Swan	6 September 2008 –
37	Adele Carles	Greens/Independent	Fremantle	16 May 2009 – 9 March 2013 (defeated)
38	**Mia Davies***	National	Central Wheatbelt	9 March 2013 – 8 March 2025 (retired)
38	Wendy Duncan*	National	Kalgoorlie	9 March 2013 – 11 March 2017 (retired)
38	Eleni Evangel	Liberal	Perth	9 March 2013 – 11 March 2017 (defeated)
38	Josie Farrer	Labor	Kimberley	9 March 2013 – 29 January 2021 (retired)
38	Glenys Godfrey	Liberal	Belmont	9 March 2013 – 11 March 2017 (defeated)
38	**Simone McGurk**	Labor	Fremantle	9 March 2013 –
44	Libby Mettam	Liberal	Vasse	18 October 2014 –
45	Robyn Clarke	Labor	Murray-Wellington	11 March 2017 – 8 March 2025 (defeated)
45	Emily Hamilton	Labor	Joondalup	11 March 2017 –
45	Lisa O'Malley	Labor	Bicton	11 March 2017 –
45	Cassie Rowe	Labor	Belmont	11 March 2017 –
45	Amber-Jade Sanderson*	Labor	Morley	11 March 2017 –
45	Jessica Shaw	Labor	Swan Hills	11 March 2017 – 8 March 2025 (retired)
45	Jessica Stojkovski	Labor	Kingsley	11 March 2017 –
45	Sabine Winton	Labor	Wanneroo	11 March 2017 –
53	Alyssa Hayden*	Liberal	Darling Range	23 June 2018 – 13 March 2021 (defeated)
54	Hannah Beazley	Labor	Victoria Park	13 March 2021 –
54	Caitlin Collins	Labor	Hillarys	13 March 2021 –
54	Lara Dalton	Labor	Geraldton	13 March 2021 – 8 March 2025 (defeated)
54	Divina D'Anna	Labor	Kimberley	13 March 2021 –
54	Kim Giddens	Labor	Bateman	13 March 2021 –
54	Meredith Hammat	Labor	Mirrabooka	13 March 2021 –
54	Jodie Hanns	Labor	Collie-Preston	13 March 2021 –
54	Jane Kelsbie	Labor	Warren-Blackwood	13 March 2021 – 8 March 2025 (defeated)
54	Ali Kent	Labor	Kalgoorlie	13 March 2021 –
54	Lisa Munday	Labor	Dawesville	13 March 2021 –
54	Rebecca Stephens	Labor	Albany	13 March 2021 – 8 March 2025 (defeated)
54	Katrina Stratton	Labor	Nedlands	13 March 2021 – 5 February 2025 (resigned to contest LC)
54	Christine Tonkin	Labor	Churchlands	13 March 2021 – 8 March 2025 (defeated)
67	Merome Beard	National/Liberal	North West Central	17 September 2022 – 8 March 2025 (defeated)
68	Magenta Marshall	Labor	Rockingham	29 July 2023 –
69	Sandra Brewer	Liberal	Cottesloe	8 March 2025 –
69	Lorna Clarke	Labor	Butler	8 March 2025 –
69	Colleen Egan	Labor	Thornlie	8 March 2025 –
69	Michelle Maynard	Labor	Swan Hills	8 March 2025 –
69	Kirrilee Warr	National	Geraldton	8 March 2025 –
69	Sook Yee Lai	Labor	Bibra Lake	8 March 2025 –

== Proportion of women in the Assembly ==
Numbers and proportions are as they were directly after the relevant election and do not take into account by-elections, defections or other changes in membership. The Liberal column also includes that party's predecessors, the Nationalist and United parties and the Liberal and Country League. The National column includes the various National Party splinter groups in the 1920s and 1980s.

Term	Labor			Liberal			National			Others			Total		
Term	Women	Total	%	Women	Total	%	Women	Total	%	Women	Total	%	Women	Total	%
1921–1924	0	17	0.0%	1	10	10.0%	0	16	0.0%	0	7	0.0%	1	50	2.0%
1924–1927	0	27	0.0%	0	9	0.0%	0	13	0.0%	0	1	0.0%	0	50	0.0%
1927–1930	1	27	3.7%	0	16	0.0%	0	7	0.0%	0	0	0.0%	1	50	2.0%
1930–1933	1	23	4.3%	0	16	0.0%	0	10	0.0%	0	1	0.0%	1	50	2.0%
1933–1936	1	30	3.3%	0	8	0.0%	0	11	0.0%	0	1	0.0%	1	50	2.0%
1936–1939	1	26	3.8%	1	8	12.5%	0	13	0.0%	0	3	0.0%	2	50	4.0%
1939–1943	1	27	3.7%	1	7	14.2%	0	12	0.0%	0	4	0.0%	2	50	4.0%
1943–1947	0	30	0.0%	1	7	14.2%	0	10	0.0%	0	3	0.0%	1	50	2.0%
1947–1950	0	23	0.0%	1	13	7.7%	0	12	0.0%	0	1	0.0%	1	50	2.0%
1950–1953	0	23	0.0%	1	15	6.7%	0	9	0.0%	0	3	0.0%	1	50	2.0%
1953–1956	0	26	0.0%	1	15	6.7%	0	9	0.0%	0	0	0.0%	1	50	2.0%
1956–1959	0	29	0.0%	0	11	0.0%	0	8	0.0%	0	2	0.0%	0	50	0.0%
1959–1962	0	23	0.0%	0	17	0.0%	0	8	0.0%	0	2	0.0%	0	50	0.0%
1962–1965	0	24	0.0%	0	18	0.0%	0	8	0.0%	0	0	0.0%	0	50	0.0%
1965–1968	0	21	0.0%	0	21	0.0%	0	8	0.0%	0	0	0.0%	0	50	0.0%
1968–1971	0	23	0.0%	0	19	0.0%	0	9	0.0%	0	0	0.0%	0	51	0.0%
1971–1974	0	26	0.0%	0	17	0.0%	0	8	0.0%	0	0	0.0%	0	51	0.0%
1974–1977	0	22	0.0%	1	23	4.3%	0	6	0.0%	0	0	0.0%	1	51	2.0%
1977–1980	0	22	0.0%	1	27	3.7%	0	6	0.0%	0	0	0.0%	1	55	1.8%
1980–1983	0	23	0.0%	1	26	3.8%	0	6	0.0%	0	0	0.0%	1	55	1.8%
1983–1986	4	32	12.5%	0	20	0.0%	0	5	0.0%	0	0	0.0%	4	57	7.0%
1986–1989	6	32	18.8%	0	19	0.0%	0	6	0.0%	0	0	0.0%	6	57	10.5%
1989–1993	6	31	19.4%	1	20	5.0%	1	6	16.7%	0	0	0.0%	8	57	14.0%
1993–1996	6	24	25.0%	2	26	7.7%	1	6	16.7%	1	1	100.0%	10	57	17.5%
1996–2001	6	19	31.6%	5	29	17.2%	1	6	16.7%	1	3	33.3%	13	57	22.8%
2001–2005	8	32	25.0%	3	16	18.8%	0	5	0.0%	2	4	50.0%	13	57	22.8%
2005–2008	9	32	28.1%	2	18	11.1%	0	5	0.0%	2	2	100.0%	13	57	22.8%
2008–2013	7	28	25.0%	2	24	8.3%	0	4	0.0%	2	3	66.7%	11	59	18.6%
2013–2017	7	21	33.3%	4	31	12.9%	2	7	28.6%	0	0	0.0%	13	59	22.0%
2017–2021	15	41	36.6%	2	13	15.4%	1	5	20.0%	0	0	0.0%	18	59	30.5%
2021–2025	26	53	49.0%	1	2	50.0%	1	4	25.0%	0	0	0.0%	28	59	47.4%
2025–	21	46	45.7%	2	7	28.6%	1	6	16.7%	0	0	0.0%	24	59	40.7%
