= Electoral results for the district of Thornlie =

Australian district election results

This is a list of electoral results for the Thornlie in Western Australian state elections.

== Members for Thornlie ==
First incarnation (1989–2005)
Member	Party	Term
Yvonne Henderson	Labor	1989–1996
Sheila McHale	Labor	1996–2005
Second incarnation (2017–present)
Chris Tallentire	Labor	2017–present

== Election results ==
=== Elections in the 2020s ===
2025 Western Australian state election: Thornlie
Party	Candidate	Votes	%	±%
Labor	Colleen Egan	11,574	46.5	−27.4
Liberal	Mahesh Arumugam	3,761	15.1	+1.0
Greens	Adam Abdul Razak	2,644	10.6	+5.7
Independent	Kevin McDonald	2,548	10.2	+10.2
One Nation	Timothy Larcombe	2,072	8.3	+8.3
Christians	Madeleine Goiran	1,344	5.4	+1.1
Legalise Cannabis	Fred Mulholland	959	3.9	+3.9
Total formal votes		24,902	94.2	−1.7
Informal votes		1,544	5.8	+1.7
Turnout		26,446	82.7	+5.0
Notional two-party-preferred count
Labor	Colleen Egan	17,246	69.3	−11.2
Liberal	Mahesh Arumugam	7,630	30.7	+11.2
Two-candidate-preferred result
Labor	Colleen Egan	15,916	64.0	−16.6
Independent	Kevin McDonald	8,952	36.0	+36.0
Labor hold				

2021 Western Australian state election: Thornlie
Party	Candidate	Votes	%	±%
Labor	Chris Tallentire	17,501	74.2	+21.5
Liberal	Kevin McDonald	3,273	13.9	−11.1
Greens	Rachel Wright	1,159	4.9	−2.0
Christians	Madeleine Goiran	1,002	4.2	+0.7
No Mandatory Vaccination	Rachael Hall	488	2.1	+2.1
WAxit	J. S. Masih	177	0.8	−0.6
Total formal votes		23,600	95.8	+1.8
Informal votes		1,035	4.2	−1.8
Turnout		24,635	83.0	−2.2
Two-party-preferred result
Labor	Chris Tallentire	19,081	80.9	+15.1
Liberal	Kevin McDonald	4,508	19.1	−15.1
Labor hold		Swing	+15.1	

=== Elections in the 2010s ===
2017 Western Australian state election: Thornlie
Party	Candidate	Votes	%	±%
Labor	Chris Tallentire	11,983	52.6	+9.1
Liberal	Rob Coales	5,682	25.0	−14.2
One Nation	Sandy Baraiolo	1,747	7.7	+7.7
Greens	Donna McAleese	1,563	6.9	+1.1
Christians	Madeleine Goiran	798	3.5	−0.3
Shooters, Fishers, Farmers	Gary Hammond	526	2.3	+2.3
Micro Business	Sibel Bennett	309	1.4	+1.4
Flux the System!	Andrew van Dam	160	0.7	+0.7
Total formal votes		22,768	94.0	+1.8
Informal votes		1,451	6.0	−1.8
Turnout		24,219	85.7	−2.5
Two-party-preferred result
Labor	Chris Tallentire	14,965	65.8	+14.0
Liberal	Rob Coales	7,781	34.2	−14.0
Labor hold		Swing	+14.0	

=== Elections in the 2000s ===
2001 Western Australian state election: Thornlie
Party	Candidate	Votes	%	±%
Labor	Sheila McHale	10,268	48.2	+6.1
Liberal	Julie Brown	5,730	26.9	−16.2
One Nation	Kevin Koevort	2,305	10.8	+10.8
Greens	Tina McVicar	1,062	5.0	−2.6
Christian Democrats	Terry Ryan	876	4.1	+4.1
Democrats	Stephen Crabbe	636	3.0	−4.2
Independent	Anwar Sayed	441	2.1	+2.1
Total formal votes		21,318	94.5	−0.2
Informal votes		1,231	5.5	+0.2
Turnout		22,549	91.4	
Two-party-preferred result
Labor	Sheila McHale	12,740	60.4	+8.9
Liberal	Julie Brown	8,364	39.6	−8.9
Labor hold		Swing	+8.9	

=== Elections in the 1990s ===
1996 Western Australian state election: Thornlie
Party	Candidate	Votes	%	±%
Liberal	Brian Brand	9,077	43.1	+0.1
Labor	Sheila McHale	8,853	42.1	−6.1
Greens	Rebecca Byrne	1,602	7.6	+5.9
Democrats	Charlton Bailey	1,514	7.2	+4.2
Total formal votes		21,046	94.7	−1.0
Informal votes		1,174	5.3	+1.0
Turnout		22,220	91.6	
Two-party-preferred result
Labor	Sheila McHale	10,815	51.5	−1.2
Liberal	Brian Brand	10,191	48.5	+1.2
Labor hold		Swing	−1.2	

1993 Western Australian state election: Thornlie
Party	Candidate	Votes	%	±%
Labor	Yvonne Henderson	9,533	51.7	−2.2
Liberal	Monica Holmes	7,386	40.0	+4.1
Independent	Joseph Isherwood	938	5.1	+5.1
Democrats	Gordon Stapp	599	3.3	+3.3
Total formal votes		18,456	95.8	+6.1
Informal votes		803	4.2	−6.1
Turnout		19,259	94.7	+2.6
Two-party-preferred result
Labor	Yvonne Henderson	10,280	55.7	−1.7
Liberal	Monica Holmes	8,176	44.3	+1.7
Labor hold		Swing	−1.7	

=== Elections in the 1980s ===
1989 Western Australian state election: Thornlie
Party	Candidate	Votes	%	±%
Labor	Yvonne Henderson	8,174	53.9	−13.4
Liberal	Antony York	5,443	35.9	+3.2
Grey Power	Phillip Giblett	1,561	10.3	+10.3
Total formal votes		15,178	89.7	
Informal votes		1,738	10.3	
Turnout		16,916	92.1	
Two-party-preferred result
Labor	Yvonne Henderson	8,705	57.4	−9.9
Liberal	Antony York	6,473	42.6	+9.9
Labor hold		Swing	−9.9	
