= Electoral results for the district of Southern River =

Western Australian district election results

This is a list of electoral results for the electoral district of Southern River in Western Australian state elections.

== Members for Southern River ==
Member	Party	Term
Monica Holmes	Liberal	1996–2001
Paul Andrews	Labor	2001–2008
Peter Abetz	Liberal	2008–2017
Terry Healy	Labor	2017–present

== Election results ==
=== Elections in the 2020s ===
2025 Western Australian state election: Southern River
Party	Candidate	Votes	%	±%
Labor	Terry Healy	15,693	58.5	+12.6
Liberal	Sudhir Chowdhary	4,405	16.4	−19.5
Greens	Angela Hecquet	2,103	7.8	+2.0
Christians	Alvin Mathew Vadakkedathu	1,190	4.4	+4.4
One Nation	Ingrid Parkin	1,174	4.4	+4.4
Legalise Cannabis	Graham Pereira	1,068	4.0	+4.0
Independent	Glenn P. W. Dewhurst	637	2.4	+2.4
Independent	Simon Simson	295	1.1	+1.1
Shooters, Fishers, Farmers	Caleb Thomas	263	1.0	+1.0
Total formal votes		26,828	94.7	−1.3
Informal votes		1,504	5.3	+1.3
Turnout		28,332	86.6	+4.8
Two-party-preferred result
Labor	Terry Healy	19,338	73.3	−9.8
Liberal	Sudhir Chowdhary	7,034	26.7	+9.8
Labor hold		Swing	−9.8	

Results are not final. Last updated on 25 March 2025 at 7:00 PM AWST

2021 Western Australian state election: Southern River
Party	Candidate	Votes	%	±%
Labor	Terry Healy	18,718	76.0	+26.3
Liberal	Ruben Zandman	2,879	11.7	−27.2
Greens	Simone Collins	875	3.6	−2.8
Christians	Gerard Spoelstra	799	3.2	+3.2
One Nation	Malcolm Heffernan	334	1.4	+1.4
No Mandatory Vaccination	Katie Hawkes	307	1.2	+1.2
WAxit	Shazi Siddiqui	283	1.1	+0.2
Liberal Democrats	Wesley Du Preez	257	1.0	+0.4
Independent	Julia Walsh	188	0.8	+0.8
Total formal votes		24,640	96.0	+0.7
Informal votes		1,039	4.0	−0.7
Turnout		25,679	86.6	+1.0
Two-party-preferred result
Labor	Terry Healy	20,472	83.1	+25.3
Liberal	Ruben Zandman	4,155	16.9	−25.3
Labor hold		Swing	+25.3	

=== Elections in the 2010s ===
2017 Western Australian state election: Southern River
Party	Candidate	Votes	%	±%
Labor	Terry Healy	11,311	49.7	+15.7
Liberal	Peter Abetz	8,853	38.9	−17.1
Greens	Toni Pikos-Sallie	1,443	6.3	+0.5
Independent	Steven Secker	311	1.4	+1.4
Independent	Craig Harley	252	1.1	+1.1
Micro Business	Aman Singh	227	1.0	+1.0
Matheson for WA	Ash Srivastava	222	1.0	+1.0
Liberal Democrats	David Fishlock	146	0.6	+0.6
Total formal votes		22,765	95.2	+1.8
Informal votes		1,145	4.8	−1.8
Turnout		23,910	88.0	+1.9
Two-party-preferred result
Labor	Terry Healy	13,170	57.9	+18.8
Liberal	Peter Abetz	9,591	42.1	−18.8
Labor gain from Liberal		Swing	+18.8	

2013 Western Australian state election: Southern River
Party	Candidate	Votes	%	±%
Liberal	Peter Abetz	13,949	63.1	+18.2
Labor	Susy Thomas	6,421	29.0	–9.6
Greens	Kate Gnanapragasam	1,176	5.3	–4.8
Christians	Damian Posthuma	570	2.6	–0.3
Total formal votes		22,116	93.8	−0.2
Informal votes		1,464	6.2	+0.2
Turnout		23,580	90.8	
Two-party-preferred result
Liberal	Peter Abetz	14,777	67.0	+15.1
Labor	Susy Thomas	7,286	33.0	–15.1
Liberal hold		Swing	+15.1	

=== Elections in the 2000s ===
2008 Western Australian state election: Southern River
Party	Candidate	Votes	%	±%
Liberal	Peter Abetz	9,382	45.0	+7.4
Labor	Paul Andrews	8,119	39.0	−8.4
Greens	Nicola Wiseman	2,149	10.3	+5.5
Family First	Renise Judge	648	3.1	−0.7
Christian Democrats	Scott Kuipers	534	2.6	−0.4
Total formal votes		20,832	94.1	−0.7
Informal votes		1,299	5.9	+0.7
Turnout		22,131	89.8	
Two-party-preferred result
Liberal	Peter Abetz	10,759	51.6	+6.8
Labor	Paul Andrews	10,073	48.4	−6.8
Liberal gain from Labor		Swing	+6.8	

2005 Western Australian state election: Southern River
Party	Candidate	Votes	%	±%
Labor	Paul Andrews	12,190	52.5	+4.8
Liberal	Monica Holmes	6,845	29.5	+1.8
Greens	Mike Beilby	1,346	5.8	+0.8
Family First	Lisa Saladine	912	3.9	+3.9
Christian Democrats	Terry Ryan	911	3.9	−0.2
One Nation	Brian Deane	562	2.4	−7.6
Independent	Tim Dowsett	442	1.9	+1.9
Total formal votes		23,208	94.5	0.0
Informal votes		1,352	5.5	0.0
Turnout		24,560	91.5	
Two-party-preferred result
Labor	Paul Andrews	14,336	61.8	+1.4
Liberal	Monica Holmes	8,858	38.2	−1.4
Labor hold		Swing	+1.4	

2001 Western Australian state election: Southern River
Party	Candidate	Votes	%	±%
Labor	Paul Andrews	11,153	40.6	−0.2
Liberal	Monica Holmes	9,682	35.2	−8.4
One Nation	Peter Hopkins	2,562	9.3	+9.3
Greens	Luke Edmonds	1,413	5.1	+5.1
Christian Democrats	Michelle Shave	959	3.5	+0.1
Democrats	Dean Craig	678	2.5	−3.1
Seniors Party	Roger Davenport	576	2.1	+2.1
Independent	John Parker	467	1.7	+1.7
Total formal votes		27,490	95.0	−0.2
Informal votes		1,457	5.0	+0.2
Turnout		28,947	91.9	
Two-party-preferred result
Labor	Paul Andrews	14,563	53.4	+4.9
Liberal	Monica Holmes	12,718	46.6	−4.9
Labor gain from Liberal		Swing	+4.9	

=== Elections in the 1990s ===
1996 Western Australian state election: Southern River
Party	Candidate	Votes	%	±%
Liberal	Monica Holmes	9,528	43.6	+1.2
Labor	Judyth Watson	8,912	40.8	−6.1
Independent	Tim Dowsett	1,449	6.6	+6.6
Democrats	Celia Dines	1,226	5.6	+2.5
Call to Australia	Michelle Shave	733	3.4	+3.4
Total formal votes		21,848	95.2	−0.7
Informal votes		1,111	4.8	+0.7
Turnout		22,959	92.0	
Two-party-preferred result
Liberal	Monica Holmes	11,234	51.5	+4.1
Labor	Judyth Watson	10,574	48.5	−4.1
Liberal gain from Labor		Swing	+4.1	
