= Electoral results for the district of Gosnells =

Western Australian district election results

This is a list of electoral results for the electoral district of Gosnells in Western Australian state elections.

== Members for Gosnells ==
Gosnells (1977–1989)
Member	Party	Term
Bob Pearce	Labor	1977–1983
Yvonne Henderson	Labor	1983–1989
Gosnells (2008–present)
Chris Tallentire	Labor	2008–2017

== Election results ==
=== Elections in the 2010s ===
2013 Western Australian state election: Gosnells
Party	Candidate	Votes	%	±%
Labor	Chris Tallentire	9,237	44.8	+2.1
Liberal	David Goode	8,040	39.0	+2.6
Greens	Luke Edmonds	1,207	5.9	–6.4
Independent	Chris Fernandez	850	4.1	+4.1
Christians	Mark Staer	782	3.8	–0.7
Independent	Debbie Butler	501	2.4	+2.4
Total formal votes		20,617	92.5	−1.6
Informal votes		1,682	7.5	+1.6
Turnout		22,299	89.3	
Two-party-preferred result
Labor	Chris Tallentire	10,896	52.9	–1.9
Liberal	David Goode	9,701	47.1	+1.9
Labor hold		Swing	–1.9	

=== Elections in the 2000s ===
2008 Western Australian state election: Gosnells
Party	Candidate	Votes	%	±%
Labor	Chris Tallentire	7,874	42.9	−9.1
Liberal	Chris Fernandez	6,453	35.2	+6.1
Greens	Luke Edmonds	2,251	12.3	+6.1
Christian Democrats	Madeleine Goiran	923	5.0	+0.7
Family First	Dave Bolt	846	4.6	+0.7
Total formal votes		18,347	93.9	+0.2
Informal votes		1,183	6.1	−0.2
Turnout		19,530	86.8	
Two-party-preferred result
Labor	Chris Tallentire	10,172	55.5	−5.9
Liberal	Chris Fernandez	8,162	44.5	+5.9
Labor hold		Swing	−5.9	

=== Elections in the 1980s ===
1986 Western Australian state election: Gosnells
Party	Candidate	Votes	%	±%
Labor	Yvonne Henderson	12,112	64.8	+3.4
Liberal	Michael Smith	6,588	35.2	−0.1
Total formal votes		18,700	97.5	+0.8
Informal votes		482	2.5	−0.8
Turnout		19,182	92.9	+3.9
Labor hold		Swing	+1.7	

1983 Western Australian state election: Gosnells
Party	Candidate	Votes	%	±%
Labor	Yvonne Henderson	8,981	61.4	
Liberal	Michael Mitchell	5,158	35.3	
Independent	Gordon Stapp	487	3.3	
Total formal votes		14,626	96.7	
Informal votes		493	3.3	
Turnout		15,119	89.0	
Two-party-preferred result
Labor	Yvonne Henderson	9,229	63.1	
Liberal	Michael Mitchell	5,397	36.9	
Labor hold		Swing		

1980 Western Australian state election: Gosnells
Party	Candidate	Votes	%	±%
Labor	Bob Pearce	9,934	54.8	+5.9
Liberal	Nancye Jones	7,268	40.1	−7.8
Independent	Gordon Stapp	930	5.1	+1.9
Total formal votes		18,132	95.6	−0.4
Informal votes		831	4.4	+0.4
Turnout		18,963	89.2	−2.3
Two-party-preferred result
Labor	Bob Pearce	10,399	57.4	+6.6
Liberal	Nancye Jones	7,733	42.6	−6.6
Labor hold		Swing	+6.6	

=== Elections in the 1970s ===
1977 Western Australian state election: Gosnells
Party	Candidate	Votes	%	±%
Labor	Bob Pearce	6,840	48.9	
Liberal	Brian Piesse	6,712	47.9	
Independent	Gordon Stapp	450	3.2	
Total formal votes		14,002	96.0	
Informal votes		585	4.0	
Turnout		14,587	91.5	
Two-party-preferred result
Labor	Bob Pearce	7,120	50.9	
Liberal	Brian Piesse	6,882	49.1	
Labor hold		Swing		
