= Electoral results for the district of Kenwick =

Western Australian district election results

This is a list of electoral results for the Electoral district of Kenwick in Western Australian state elections.

== Members for Kenwick ==
Kenwick (1989–1996)
Member	Party	Term
Judyth Watson	Labor	1989–1996
Kenwick (2005–2008)
Member	Party	Term
Sheila McHale	Labor	2005–2008

== Election results ==
=== Elections in the 2000s ===
2005 Western Australian state election: Kenwick
Party	Candidate	Votes	%	±%
Labor	Sheila McHale	12,261	54.2	+5.9
Liberal	John Kennebury	6,095	26.9	+2.0
Greens	Camille Inifer	1,518	6.7	+0.9
One Nation	Lloyd Boon	962	4.3	−7.5
Christian Democrats	Lukas Butler	916	4.0	+0.3
Family First	Moyna Rapp	877	3.9	+3.9
Total formal votes		22,629	93.2	−0.4
Informal votes		1,664	6.8	+0.4
Turnout		24,293	89.3	
Two-party-preferred result
Labor	Sheila McHale	14,376	63.6	+0.4
Liberal	John Kennebury	8,228	36.4	−0.4
Labor hold		Swing	+0.4	

=== Elections in the 1990s ===
1993 Western Australian state election: Kenwick
Party	Candidate	Votes	%	±%
Labor	Judyth Watson	8,847	47.5	−2.0
Liberal	Leslie McMahon	7,616	40.9	+6.6
Greens	Jacqueline Robinson	857	4.6	+4.6
Independent	Paul Augustson	600	3.2	+3.2
Democrats	Valma Preston	428	2.3	−3.1
Independent	Jean Jeans	290	1.6	−0.9
Total formal votes		18,638	94.8	+5.9
Informal votes		1,024	5.2	−5.9
Turnout		19,662	93.9	+2.8
Two-party-preferred result
Labor	Judyth Watson	10,069	54.0	−2.9
Liberal	Leslie McMahon	8,569	46.0	+2.9
Labor hold		Swing	−2.9	

=== Elections in the 1980s ===
1989 Western Australian state election: Kenwick
Party	Candidate	Votes	%	±%
Labor	Judyth Watson	8,286	49.5	−16.3
Liberal	Joao Malta	5,739	34.3	+0.1
Grey Power	William Meadwell	1,412	8.4	+8.4
Democrats	Donald Bryant	895	5.4	+5.4
Independent	Jean Jeans	410	2.5	+2.5
Total formal votes		16,742	88.9	
Informal votes		2,087	11.1	
Turnout		18,829	91.1	
Two-party-preferred result
Labor	Judyth Watson	9,533	56.9	−8.9
Liberal	Joao Malta	7,209	43.1	+8.9
Labor hold		Swing	−8.9	
