= Abetz =

Abetz is a German surname. Notable people with this name include:

- Eric Abetz (born 1958), Australian politician
- Otto Abetz (1903–1958), German ambassador to Vichy France during World War II
- Peter Abetz (born 1952), Australian politician
