= Albany Prison =

Albany Prison may refer to:

- Albany Regional Prison, in Albany, Western Australia
- HM Prison Albany, on the Isle of Wight, England
