= Andrew Mallard =

Australian wrongfully convicted of murder (1962–2019)

Andrew Mark Mallard (16 August 1962 – 18 April 2019) was a British-born Australian who was wrongfully convicted of murder in 1995 and sentenced to life imprisonment. Almost 12 years later, after an appeal to the High Court of Australia, his conviction was quashed and a retrial ordered. However, the charges against him were dropped and Mallard was released. At the time, the director of public prosecutions stated that Mallard remained the prime suspect and that if further evidence became available he could still be prosecuted. He was paid $3.25 million compensation by the state government. The Western Australian Commission on Crime and Corruption investigated whether there was misconduct by any public officer (police, prosecutors or members of parliament) associated with this case and made findings against two policemen and a senior prosecutor.

Mallard died on 18 April 2019 in Los Angeles, the home area of his fiancée, after being involved in a hit and run.

== Early life ==
Andrew Mark Mallard was born in England on 16 August 1962 to parents Roy and Grace Mallard, who already had a 10-year-old daughter. The Mallards emigrated to Perth in 1967, and Andrew, unusually tall for his age, had trouble settling in to their new life, and was bullied throughout his school life. Leaving school at 16, by 18 he was unemployed and often spent his time smoking marijuana and at nightclubs, and unsuccessfully attempted to join the army, before briefly trying to return to the UK. His experiences affected him psychologically, and therapy helped him gain enough confidence to move out of home, but by May 1994 he was homeless and living temporarily at his girlfriend's flat in Mosman Park.

== Lawrence murder and trial ==
Pamela Lawrence, a business proprietor on Glyde Street, Mosman Park, was attacked at her jewellery shop, called "Flora Metallica", on the afternoon of 23 May 1994. A staff member had finished work at 3:00 pm, leaving Lawrence alone in the shop, and at 5:02 pm, the staff member's school-age daughter was passing by the shop and saw a stranger standing behind the counter, describing him as Caucasian, tall, with a bandanna and a ginger beard. At 6:15 pm Lawrence's husband, Peter, became worried when she had not returned home and tried unsuccessfully to call the shop, then drove to the premises and found her barely alive. Lawrence died of severe head wounds around 7:00 pm in the ambulance on the way to hospital.

Mallard quickly became a suspect in the murder. He had been arrested the same day as the murder for a break-in and theft (of his girlfriend's ex-boyfriend's apartment), had been released around 4:00 pm, before arriving via taxi in Mosman Park around 5:00 pm. Despite his personal issues and being unable to clearly account for his movements, Mallard had no history of violence, and no murder weapon connecting him was found. Furthermore, no blood was found on Mallard, despite the severity of the attack, nor was his DNA or trace evidence found. The evidence used in Mallard's trial was therefore scanty and obscure, and it was later revealed that police manipulated or withheld vital information (including an undercover operation) from his defence team. He was convicted chiefly on two pieces of evidence. The first was a set of police notes of interviews with Mallard during which, the police claimed, he had confessed. These notes had not been signed by Mallard. The second was a video recording of the last twenty minutes of Mallard's eleven hours of interviews. The video shows Mallard speculating as to how the murderer might have killed Lawrence; police claimed that, although it was given in third-person, it was a confession. He was convicted on the confessions purportedly given during unrecorded interviews and the partial video-recording of an interview.

== Investigation and appeals ==
Despite the issues in his conviction, Mallard's appeal to the Supreme Court of Western Australia in 1996 was dismissed. In 1998, Mallard's family enlisted the help of investigative journalist Colleen Egan, who in turn managed to get John Quigley MLA and Malcolm McCusker QC involved. National law firm Clayton Utz also took on the case pro bono. All were appalled at the manner in which Mallard's trial had been conducted and eventually came to be convinced that he was innocent. Based on fresh evidence uncovered by this team, including multiple police reports that, against standard practice, had never been passed to the defence team, the case was returned to the Court of Criminal Appeal in June 2003. Despite the fresh evidence and an uncontested claim that the DPP had deliberately concealed evidence from the defence, the Court of Criminal Appeal again dismissed the appeal.

In October 2004, Mallard's legal team was granted special leave to appeal to the High Court of Australia and on 6–7 September 2005, Mallard's appeal was heard in the High Court and the justices subsequently judged unanimously that his conviction be quashed and a retrial be ordered. Mallard was represented at the appeal by current High Court Justice James Edelman led by Malcolm McCusker. During the hearing, Justice Michael Kirby was reported to have said that on one of the pieces of evidence alone—a forensic report, not disclosed to the defence, showing that Mallard's theory about the weapon used in the murder could not have been true—a retrial should have been ordered. The Department of Public Prosecutions (DPP) did not immediately drop charges against Mallard but did so six months later immediately before a directions hearing was due. After almost 12 years in prison, Mallard was released on 20 February 2006. However, in announcing that the trial would not proceed the DPP stated:

"Finally, I note for the record and for the future that this decision is made on evidence presently available to the prosecution. The discharge of Mr. Andrew Mallard on this charge does not alter the fact that he remains the prime suspect for this murder. Should any credible evidence present in the future which again gives the state reasonable prospects of obtaining a conviction again, the state would again prosecute him."

== Review of the case ==
Following the discontinuation of the prosecution by the DPP, the Commissioner of Police instituted a review of the investigation to establish whether there were sufficient grounds for a "cold case" review. The review quickly located a record of a palm print which matched that of Simon Rochford, who had confessed to murdering his girlfriend, Brigitta Dickens, on 15 July 1994, seven weeks after Mrs. Lawrence was killed. The print had been found on the top of a display case in Lawrence's shop, which was significant, as it had been the practice of the shop staff to wipe the top of that case after each customer left. Rochford's appearance, in particular his beard, was more consistent with the original accounts of eyewitnesses than was Mallard's.

On this basis the review became a cold case review. The weapon used by Rochford to kill Dickens was a steel collar of the type used by weight lifters to secure weights to a bar. Rochford had attached the collar to a broom handle and used it to club Dickens to death. The actual collar could not be located in 2006 but its dimensions were known and a photograph was available. The shape and dimensions of the collar were consistent with the form of the wounds in Lawrence's skull. The photograph of the collar indicated that it was painted blue and a rucksack belonging to Rochford was found to contain blue paint flakes which were identical in chemical composition to those removed from Lawrence's wounds. Later, at about 7:45 am AWST on 19 May 2006, the body of Simon Rochford was discovered in his cell at Albany Maximum Security Prison by prison officers, just hours after he had been named as "a person of significant interest" in the Pamela Lawrence investigation.

On 12 May 2006, five police officers were stood down by the West Australian Police Commissioner in relation to the original investigation into the murder. On 11 October 2006, the commissioner announced that the cold case review was complete, that Mallard was no longer a person of interest in relation to the case; that there was sufficient evidence to implicate Simon Rochford and that, if he had still been living, the police would have prepared a brief of evidence against him for the WA Director of Public Prosecutions. The police commissioner apologised to Mallard for any part the police had played in his conviction. The Premier of Western Australia indicated that the government would be considering compensation, though the state's attorney general stated that no decision could be made until the Commission on Crime and Corruption had completed its investigation. However, on 22 November 2006, the Adelaide Advertiser carried an AAP story stating that Mallard had received a AUD$200,000 ex gratia payment as partial compensation.

In spring 1997, David Caporn, who was instrumental in Mallard's arrest and conviction, had taken over WA Macro Taskforce's "dud" investigation into the Claremont serial killings for two years and later rose to the rank of assistant police commissioner. He was removed in 2009 amid an inquiry into corruption and took a senior position in the state fire authority.

== Commission on Crime and Corruption hearings ==
The Commission on Crime and Corruption (CCC) announced that it was studying the report of the cold case review and would be holding public hearings in 2007. In the meantime it had asked the police to not release the full report, either to the public or within the police service, and in particular, to ensure that police involved in the original investigation had no access to it. The CCC hearings into whether police and/or prosecutors behaved unethically or illegally in the Mallard case began on 31 July 2007. On 7 October 2008 the CCC announced its recommendations that disciplinary action be taken against two assistant police commissioners, Mal Shervill and David Caporn and the deputy director of public prosecution Ken Bates who was asked to step down from the DPP's office in 2009 and was later reprimanded by the State Administrative Tribunal and fined $10,000 for professional misconduct. The two police officers subsequently resigned, thereby removing any chance of disciplinary proceedings going ahead.

In May 2009, Mallard was offered a payment of $3.25 million as settlement, though the premier of the state, Colin Barnett, said that were Mallard to take civil action against those he held responsible for his wrongful conviction, the government would support any servant of the state in that event.

Mallard pledged to spend it on his mother and sister and rebuilding his life, stating: "I want to be like everybody else. I want to have a wife and a family and to provide for my family through my own efforts."

== Media ==
A documentary titled Saving Andrew Mallard was directed by Michael Muntz and produced by Artemis International, focusing on Mallard's family, its struggle to have him freed, the deception undertaken by the original police investigation team and the evidence uncovered that eventually led to Mallard's freedom. It was first aired on ABC Television on 4 May 2006. It was short-listed for a Walkley Award, and Muntz won the Outstanding Achievement in Directing Award in the WA Screen Awards. The documentary's epilogue noted that the DPP still considered Mallard a prime suspect in its investigation at that time.

A book about the case, Murderer No More: Andrew Mallard and the Epic Fight that Proved his Innocence, was written by Colleen Egan, the journalist who campaigned on Mallard's behalf for eight years, was published by Allen & Unwin in June 2010. A Casefile True Crime Podcast detailing the case was released on 29 May 2016.

== Later life and death ==
Having completed a university degree in fine art, Mallard moved to London in 2010 to further his studies.

He was engaged to be married, and frequently travelled to Los Angeles where his fiancée lived. In the early hours of 18 April 2019, he was fatally struck by a car (as a victim of a hit and run) while crossing a road in Hollywood at the age of 56.

== See also ==
- Graham Stafford
- List of miscarriage of justice cases
