= Southern River College =

Location
- Gosnells, Western Australia; Australia; 32°05′06″S 115°58′53″E

Information
- Type: Independent public co-educational high day school
- Motto: Inspire
- Established: 1976; 50 years ago
- Educational authority: WA Department of Education
- Principal: Heath Dullard
- Years: 7–12
- Enrolment: 908 (2019)
- Campus type: Suburban
- Colours: Teal and blue
- Website: www.southernrivercollege.wa.edu.au

Southern River College is an independent public co-educational high day school in the City of Gosnells, located on Southern River Road in Gosnells, a suburb of Perth, Western Australia.

The school was established in 1976 as Gosnells Senior High School (renamed in 2003) and has an attendance of approximately 900 students from Year 7 to Year 12. It became an Independent Public School in 2015. The catchment area for the school is Gosnells, Huntingdale and Southern River. Feeder schools include Gosnells, Ashburton Drive, Seaforth, Huntingdale, Wirrabirra and Southern Grove Primary Schools.

== Overview ==
Southern River College runs an academic and general education program: this includes Academic En-richment 7 to 12, ATAR and Vocational Education Pathways and STEM option programs in mechatronics and electronics. The college operates Inspire programs in Music, Netball and Soccer. Southern River College provide support programs via their Teaching and Learning Centre (TLC), Literacy and Numeracy Development Classes and Specialist Autism Extension Program (SALP).

== Gallery ==
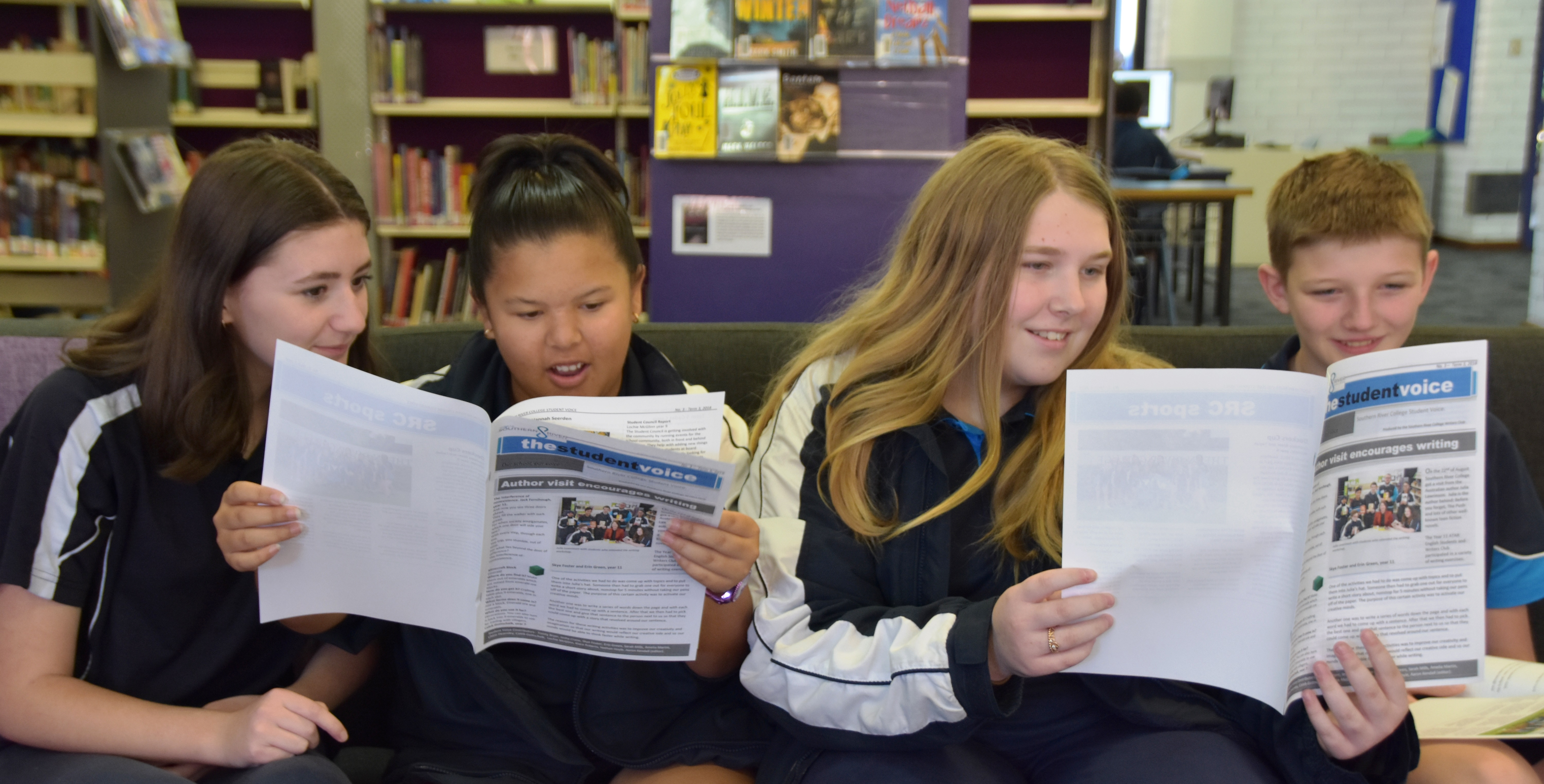

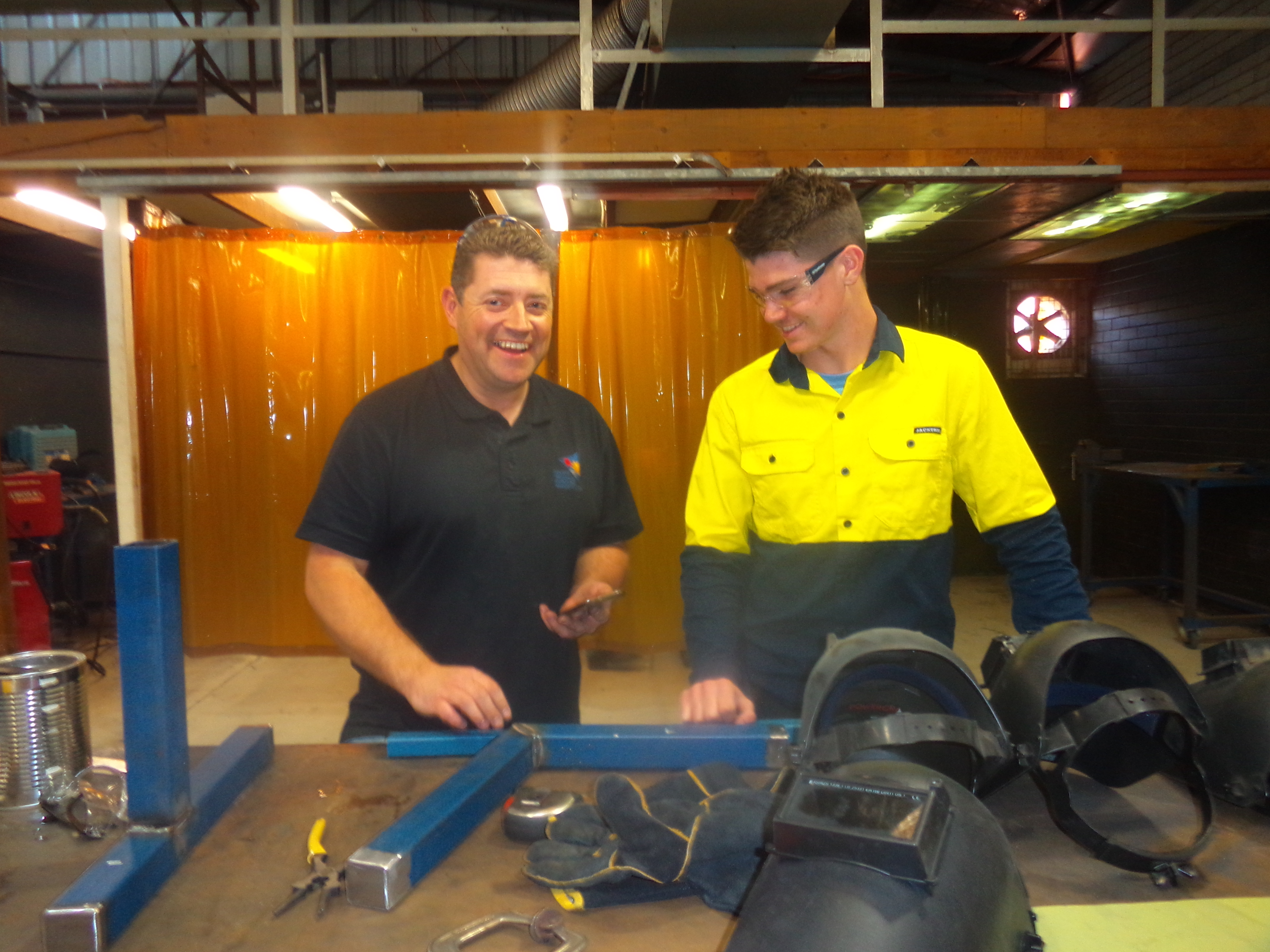

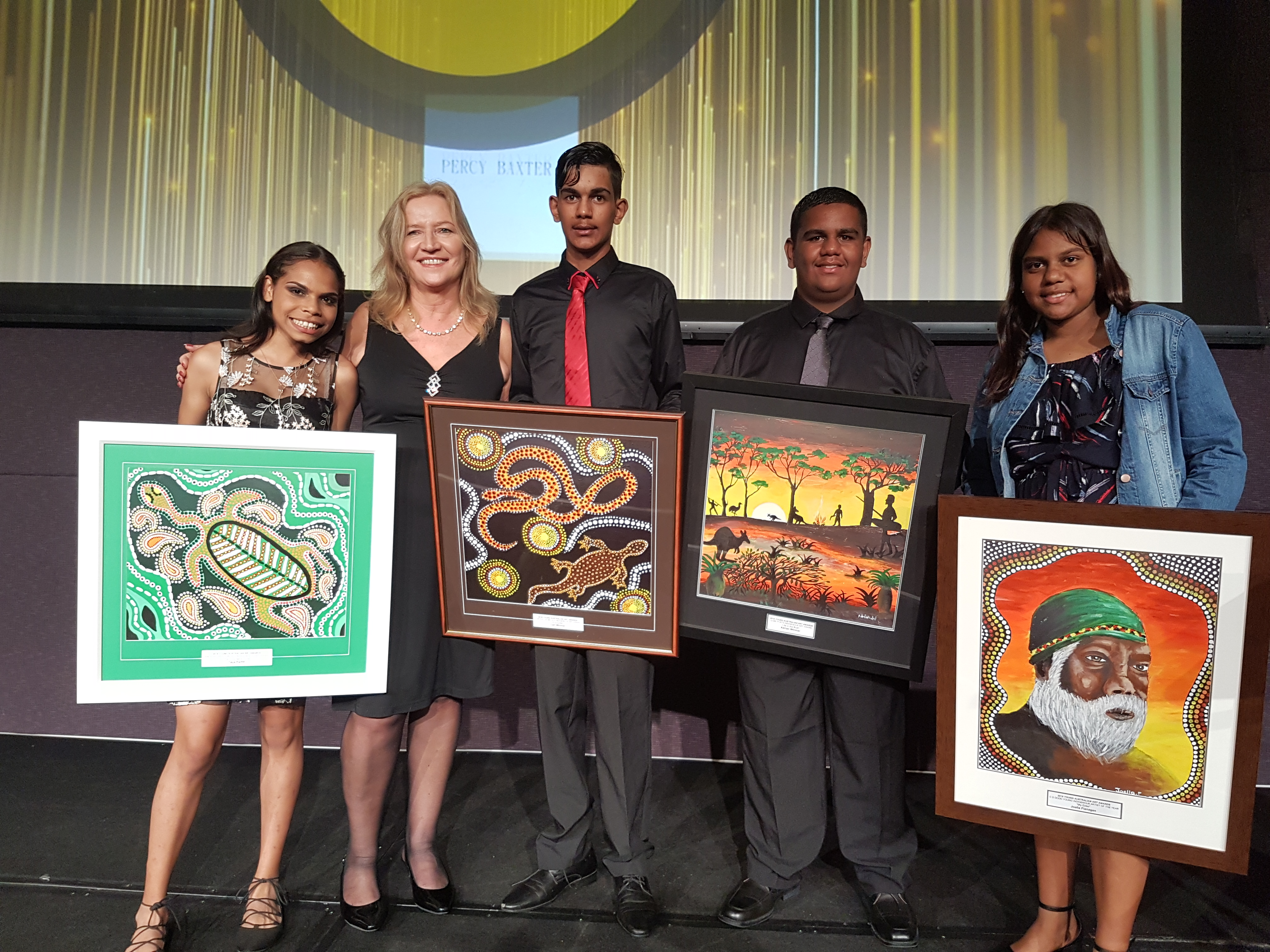

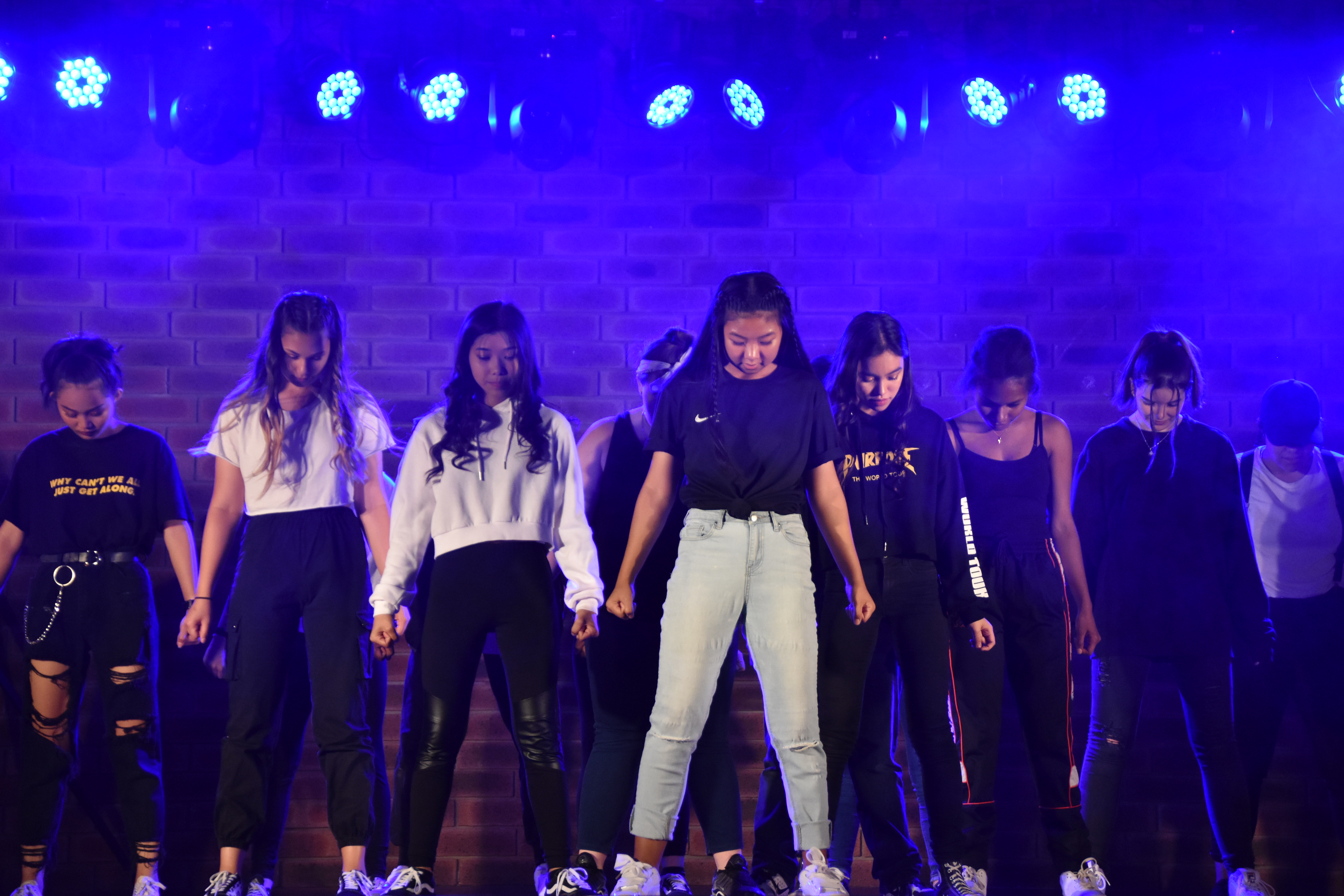

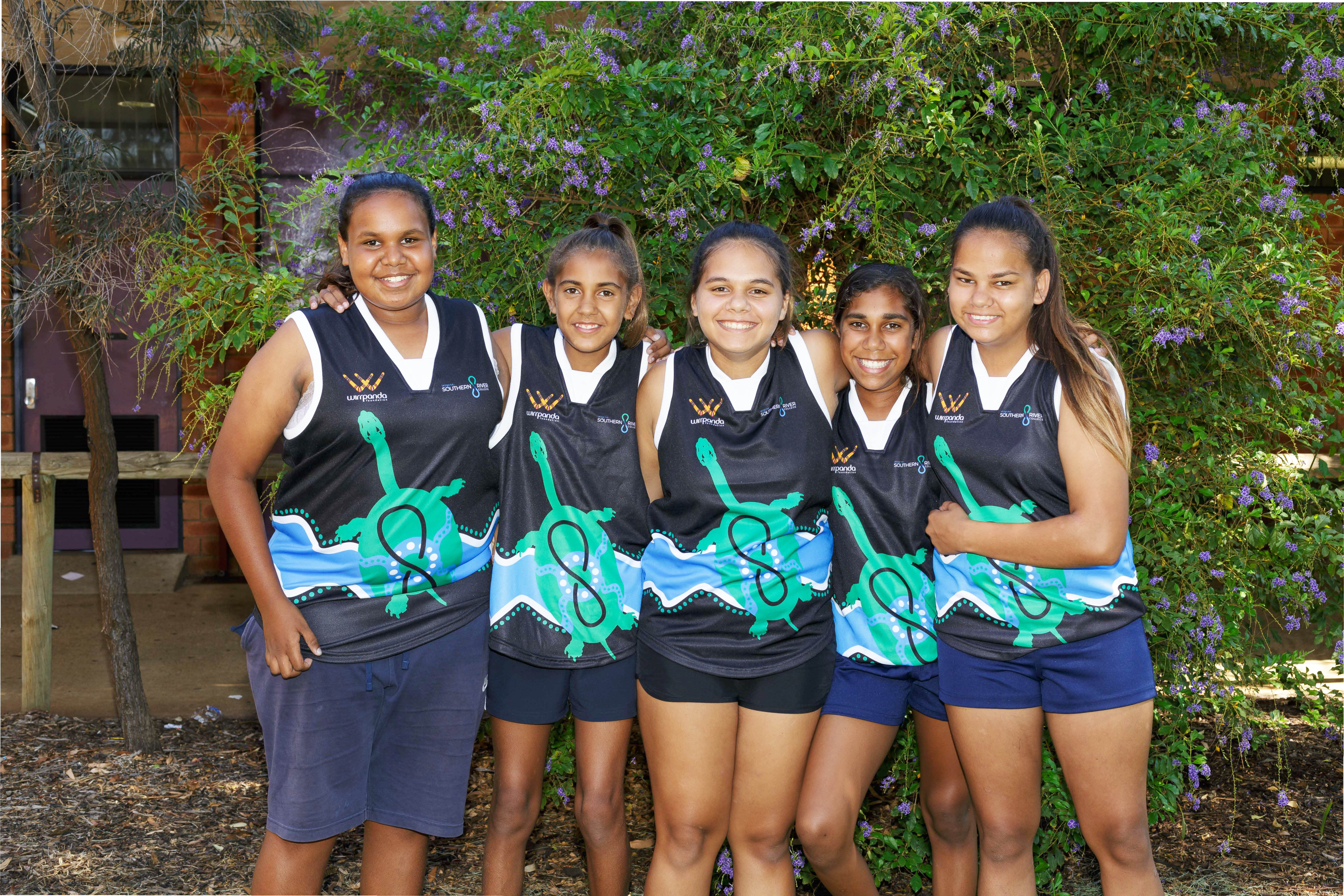

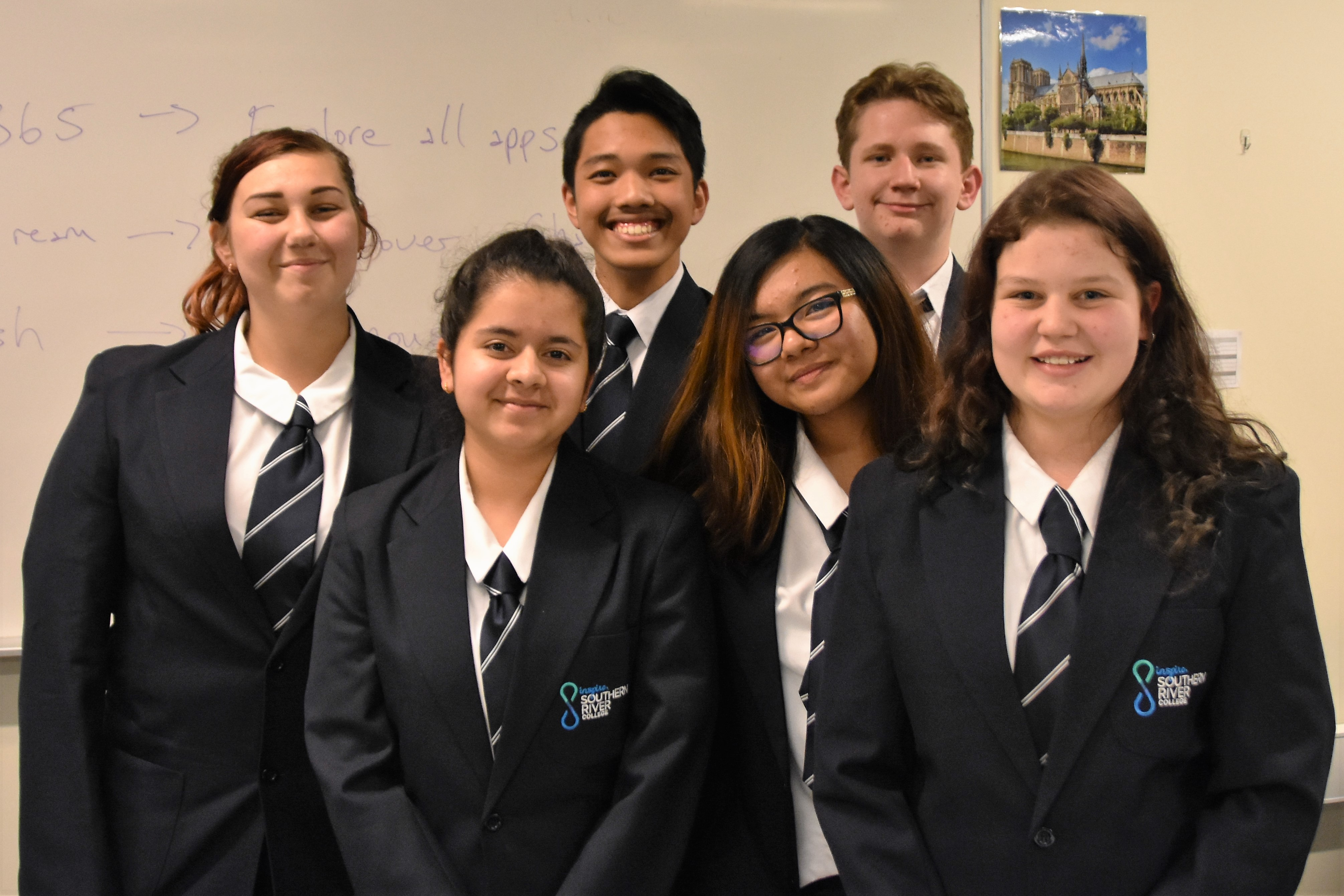

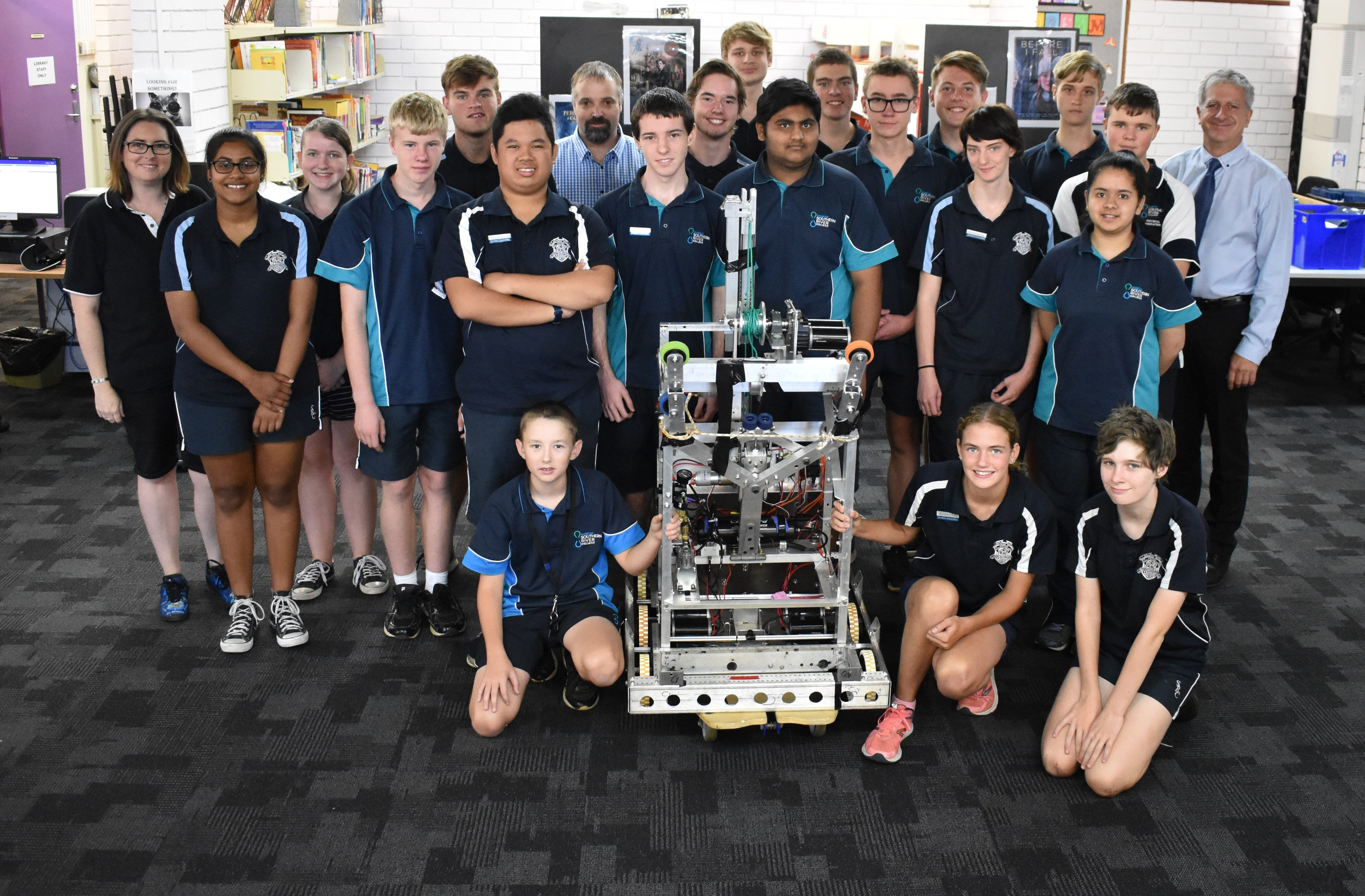

== See also ==
- List of schools in the Perth metropolitan area
