= Gerald Arthur =

Australian cricketer

Personal information
- Full name: Gerald Charles Arthur
- Born: 25 July 1913; Yarloop, Western Australia
- Died: 9 November 2008 (aged 95); Gosnells, Western Australia
- Batting: Right-handed
- Bowling: Wicket-keeper

Domestic team information
- Years: Team
- 1937/38: Western Australia

Career statistics
Competition	First-class
Matches	3
Runs scored	53
Batting average	8.83
100s/50s	0/0
Top score	27
Catches/stumpings	4/1
- Source: CricketArchive, 29 July 2011

Gerald Charles Arthur (25 July 1913 – 9 November 2008) was an Australian cricketer who played three first-class matches as a middle-order batsman and wicket-keeper for Western Australia in 1937. Arthur played one match for the Western Australia Colts against New South Wales in 1935 as a wicket-keeper. All of his first-class matches came on a tour of the Eastern states of Australia during the 1937–38 season. On debut against Victoria he scored 4 and 27, batting at #4 in both innings. In his second match, also against Victoria, he played as a wicket-keeper, effecting four dismissals – three catches and a stumping – as well as being involved in two run outs. Arthur was replaced by the usual keeper Ossie Lovelock for the final tour match, against South Australia at the Adelaide Oval. He made 10 and four batting at eight and nine in each innings respectively.
