= Bob Pearce =

Australian politician

- Constituency: Gosnells, Armadale

Personal details
- Born: 24 February 1946 (age 80) Perth, Western Australia
- Party: Labor
- Spouse: Barbara Collins
- Profession: School teacher

Robert John Pearce (born 24 February 1946) is a former Australian politician, who was a member of the Western Australian Legislative Assembly from 1977 until 1993 representing the seats of Gosnells and Armadale.

== Biography ==
Pearce was born in Perth to Ronald Malcolm Pearce, a professional fisherman, and Betty Pearce (née Crain). He was educated at Bayswater Primary School. During a three-year stay in Tasmania he attended Hobart High School for years 8–10, returning to Western Australia and Governor Stirling Senior High School for years 11 and 12 in 1962–1963, serving as school captain in his final year. He then completed a Bachelor of Arts at the University of Western Australia (UWA), and a Diploma of Education at Claremont Teachers' College, graduating in 1969. On 19 January 1969, he married Barbara Joy Collins at St Martin's Church in Kensington. Pearce then became a secondary school teacher, teaching at Eastern Goldfields Senior High School in Kalgoorlie (1970–1972); Bentley High School (1973–1974) and Lynwood Senior High School (1975–1976), where he became Senior Master in English.

Pearce was active in student politics. At UWA, he was secretary of the University of Western Australia Student Guild and served as vice-president on two occasions. In 1969 he became an honorary Life Associate of the Student Guild and also served as president of the National Union of Australian University Students (a predecessor to the National Union of Students) in 1969. He subsequently joined the State School Teachers Union of Western Australia, and was elected vice-president in 1976, and whilst in Kalgoorlie and Lynwood he served as secretary of local Labor party branches, serving on the party's State Executive in 1973. While in Kalgoorlie and Lynwood he served as secretary of local Labor party branches, as well as being a member of the party's State Executive in 1973.

== Political career ==
Pearce was preselected for the new seat of Gosnells ahead of the 1977 state election, beating Nick Clarke, a telecommunications technician, and narrowly won the seat, beating his Liberal rival by 238 votes. He was appointed Deputy Opposition Whip in 1977, and in June 1978, was commissioned to write a report into improving Labor's prospects at the 1980 election. He recommended that the party concentrate its energies on "middle class" seats. From 1980, he served as the Shadow Minister for Education and Women's Interests.

With Labor's election victory at the February 1983 election under leader Brian Burke, at which Pearce contested and won the new seat of Armadale, Pearce was promoted to the Ministry, serving as Minister for Education in the Burke ministry. On 20 December 1984 he was also given the Planning portfolio, and on 16 March 1987 the Intergovernmental Relations portfolio. From 12 May 1986 until 25 July 1986, he was also the Minister for Police and Emergency Services after Arthur Tonkin's departure from the Ministry. At this time he also became Leader of the House in the Legislative Assembly, responsible for managing government business, and held that position until his departure from the Ministry.

When Peter Dowding became premier in February 1988, in a cabinet reshuffle designed to move ministers from portfolios in which they had been controversial, Pearce moved to the Transport portfolio and took on the Parliamentary and Electoral Reform portfolio, overseeing the implementation of the Acts Amendment (Electoral Reform) Act 1987 which had been steered through by former deputy premier Mal Bryce. Following the February 1989 election, at which the Environment Minister Barry Hodge lost his seat, Pearce took on the portfolio.

When Carmen Lawrence became premier in February 1990, Pearce lost all roles except Environment and Leader of the House in the Legislative Assembly, but increased in seniority within the Cabinet.

On 20 October 1992, it was announced by the Premier, following the delivery of Part One of the Royal Commission into WA Inc, that a finding of improper conduct had been made against Pearce and that he would stand down from the Ministry and vacate his parliamentary seat after the next election. He was accused of acting improperly in making information public about the Liberal Party president's fund withdrawals from the Teachers' Credit Society, which failed in 1987. Pearce denied the allegations, but stated that Westminster conventions meant he was required to resign anyway. On 26 October 1992, he was replaced as Environment Minister by Jim McGinty, and as Leader of the House by Eric Ripper.

In 1998, he became Executive Director of the Forest Industries Federation of Western Australia and in March 2008, he became director of the National Association of Forest Industries.

Parliament of Western Australia
Preceded by New seat	Member for Gosnells; 1977–1983	Succeeded by Yvonne Henderson
Preceded by New seat	Member for Armadale; 1983–1993	Succeeded by Kay Hallahan
Preceded by Jim Clarko	Minister for Education; 1983–1988	Succeeded by Carmen Lawrence
Preceded by Gavan Troy	Minister for Transport; 1988–1990	Succeeded by Pam Beggs
Preceded by Barry Hodge	Minister for the Environment; 1989–1992	Succeeded by Jim McGinty
