= Southern River, Western Australia =

Southern River Perth, Western Australia
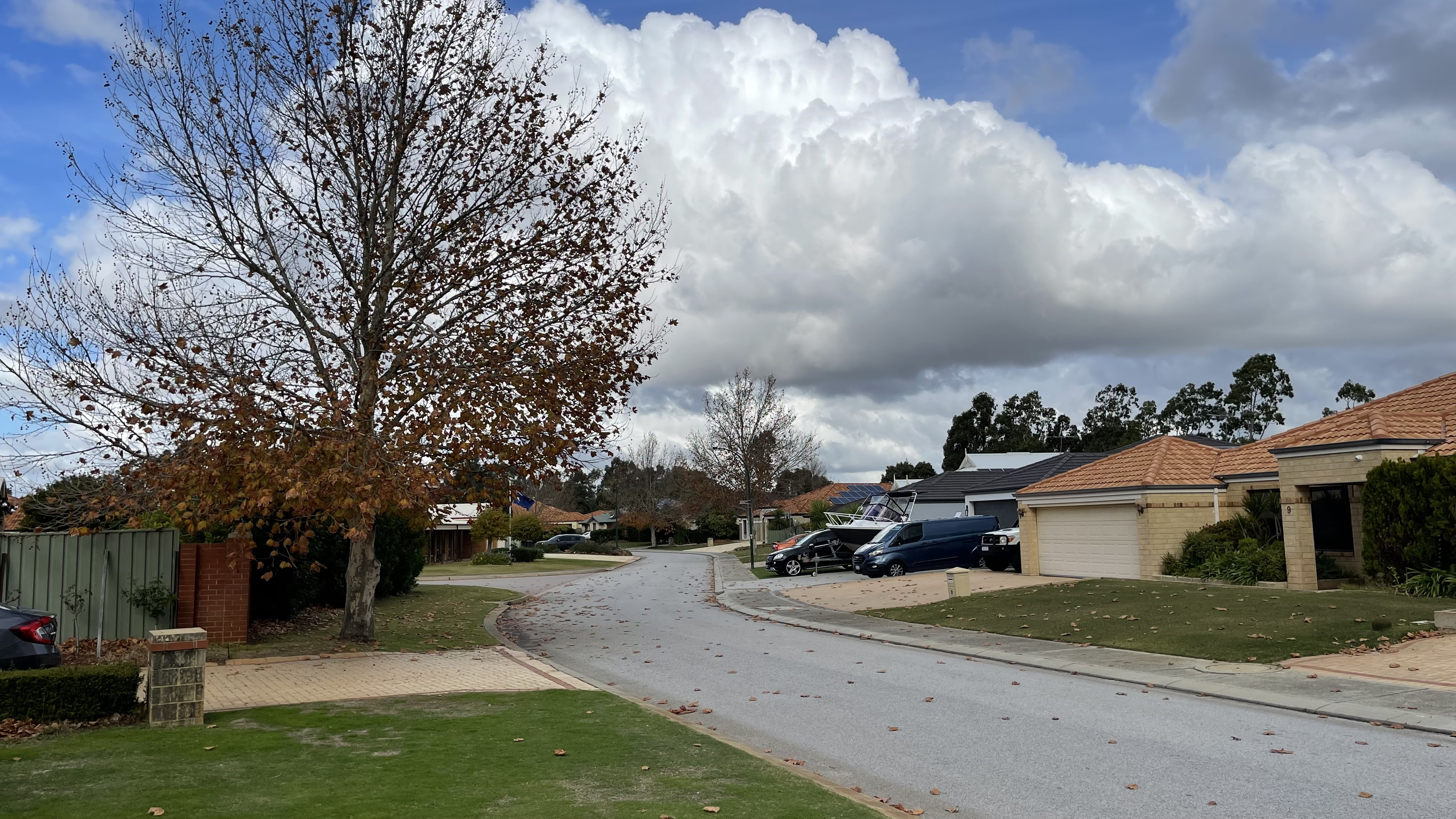
- Conder Way in Southern River, 2022
- Coordinates: 32°06′24″S 115°57′38″E
- Population: 12,852 (SAL 2021)
- Postcode(s): 6110
- LGA(s): City of Gosnells
- State electorate(s): Southern River
- Federal division(s): Burt
Suburbs around Southern River:
Canning Vale	Huntingdale	Gosnells
Canning Vale	Southern River	Camillo
Forrestdale	Forrestdale	Armadale

Southern River is a suburb of Perth, Western Australia, located within the City of Gosnells.

It was originally a rural area with farms for egg production, horse breeding properties and boarding kennels for cats and dogs. These farms combined gave the area a population of less than 500 people.

The current environment is just undergoing major changes; plans for the next five years will see the suburb totally redeveloped into medium-density residential properties with an average block size of 700 square metres (7,500 sq ft). The result will be a population increase to above 15,000; along with this will be the building of all the necessary infrastructure like shops, schools, parks and gardens.

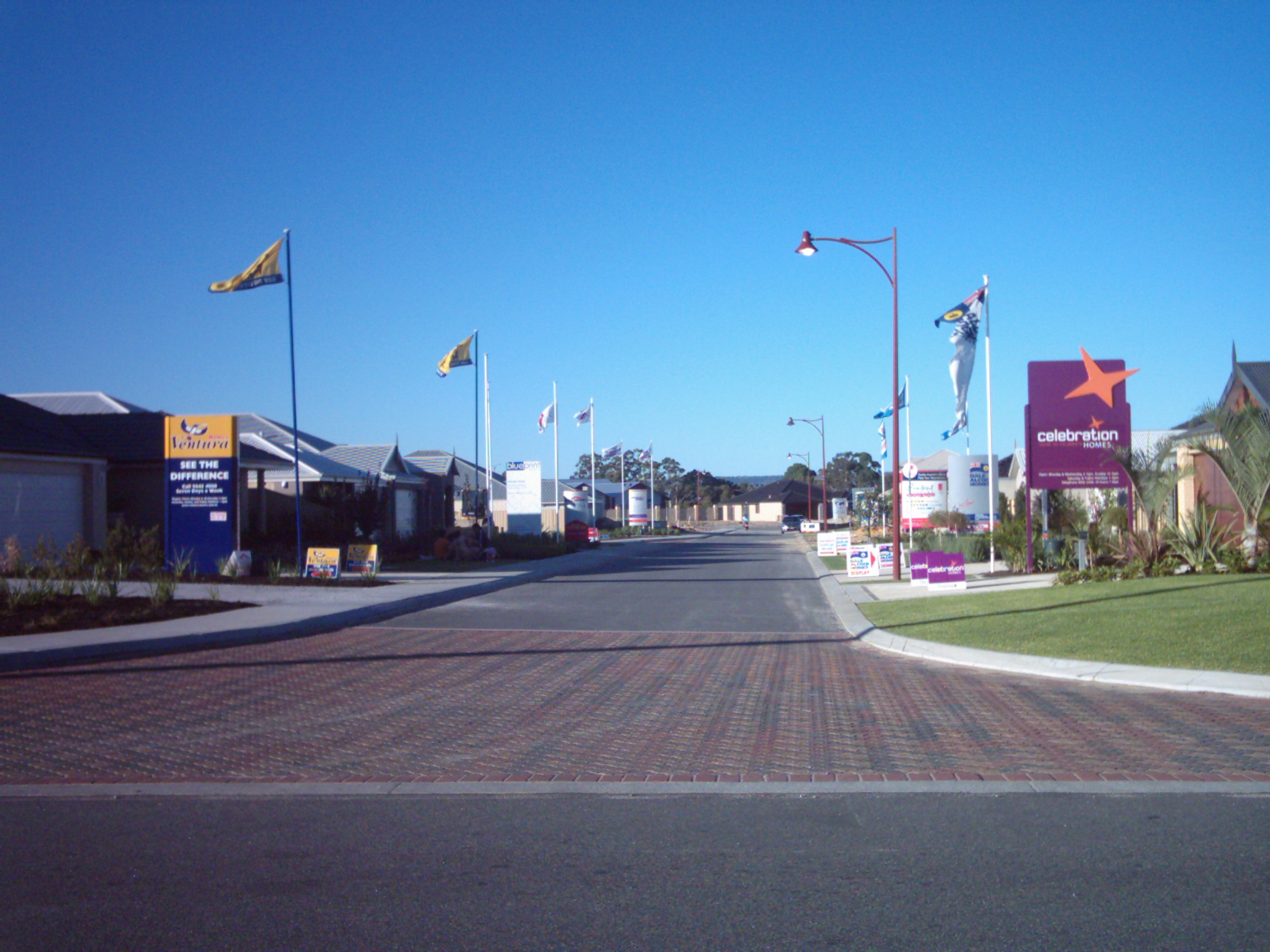
Display homes Southern River in 2006

The region bounded by Ranford Road, Passmore Street, Matison Street and Holmes Road, is likely to retain its special status and unique lifestyle for the foreseeable future. Most residents are involved in either greyhound racing or the breeding showing and trialling of pedigree dogs and/or cats. Several boarding catteries and kennels are found in the area, servicing a large proportion of the Perth metropolitan area.

== Facilities ==
There is a local shopping centre, Southern River Shopping Centre, along Bristle Avenue and Ranford Road. A Coles Supermarket anchors the precinct. Bunnings Harrisdale is opposite the shopping centre. The state public secondary college, Southern River College, is located along Southern River Road but in Gosnells proper. There is also a new shopping centre called Southern River East in the east of the suburb that opened in February 2022.

== Transport ==
=== Bus ===
- 204 Maddington Station to Murdoch University – serves Warton Road
- 212 Thornlie Station to Canning Vale – serves Harpenden Street and Holmes Street
- 233 Gosnells Station to Cockburn Central Station – serves Southern River Road
- 517 Thornlie Station to Murdoch TAFE – serves Southern River Road, Holmes Street, Balfour Street, Didcot Street, Castlewood Parkway, Edencourt Drive and Furley Road
- 518 to Cockburn Central Station to Murdoch TAFE – serves Ranford Road
