= Yvonne Henderson =

Australian politician (born 1948)

The Honourable Yvonne Henderson

Member of the Legislative Assembly of Western Australia
- In office 19 February 1983 – 4 February 1989
- Preceded by: Bob Pearce
- Succeeded by: None (abolished)
- Constituency: Gosnells
- In office 4 February 1989 – 14 December 1996
- Preceded by: None (new creation)
- Succeeded by: Sheila McHale
- Constituency: Thornlie

Personal details
- Born: Yvonne Daphne Finn; 16 May 1948 (age 78) Wakefield, Yorkshire, England
- Party: Labor
- Education: University of Western Australia

Yvonne Daphne Henderson (née Finn; born 16 May 1948) is a former Australian politician who was a Labor Party member of the Legislative Assembly of Western Australia from 1983 to 1996. She served as a minister in the governments of Peter Dowding and Carmen Lawrence.

Henderson was born in Wakefield, Yorkshire, England, but her family moved to Perth when she was an infant. She attended John Curtin Senior High School before going on to the University of Western Australia, where she studied to be a teacher. After stints at Melville Senior High School and Morley Senior High School, Henderson eventually became deputy principal of Mirrabooka Senior High School (from 1977 to 1982). An official of the State School Teachers Union and a member of the Labor Party since 1975, she stood for parliament at the 1983 state election, winning the safe Labor seat of Gosnells.

Following the retirement of Brian Burke in February 1988, Henderson was elevated to the new ministry formed by Peter Dowding, as Minister for Lands and Minister for the Arts. After the 1989 election, where she transferred to the new seat of Thornlie, she was instead made Minister for Consumer Affairs and Minister for Works and Services. Following Dowding's resignation in February 1990, Henderson was retained in the new ministry formed by Carmen Lawrence, as Minister for Consumer Affairs and Minister for Housing. Following a reshuffle in February 1991, she was additionally made Minister for Productivity and Labour Relations, with Jim McGinty replacing her as housing minister. During her period in cabinet, Henderson became the first minister to give birth while in office.

Following the defeat of the Labor government at the 1993 state election, Henderson continued on as a shadow minister, serving under four opposition leaders (Carmen Lawrence, Ian Taylor, Jim McGinty, and Geoff Gallop). She retired at the 1996 election. In June 2003, under the Gallop Labor government, Henderson was appointed head of the state government's Equal Opportunity Commission. She remained in the role until her retirement in June 2013.

== See also ==
- Women in the Western Australian Legislative Assembly

Parliament of Western Australia
Preceded by Bob Pearce	Member for Gosnells; 1983–1989	Abolished
New creation	Member for Thornlie; 1989–1996	Succeeded by Sheila McHale
Political offices
Preceded by Keith Wilson	Minister for Lands; 1988–1989	Succeeded by Kay Hallahan
Preceded by David Parker	Minister for the Arts; 1988–1989	Succeeded by David Parker
Preceded by Graham Edwards	Minister for Consumer Affairs; 1989–1993	Succeeded by Peter Foss
Preceded by Gavan Troy	Minister for Works and Services; 1989–1990	Succeeded by Pam Buchanan
Preceded by Pam Beggs	Minister for Housing; 1990–1991	Succeeded by Jim McGinty
Preceded by Gavan Troy	Minister for Productivity and Labour Relations; 1991–1993	Succeeded by Graham Kierath
