= Otto Abetz =

German ambassador in Vichy France (1903–1958)

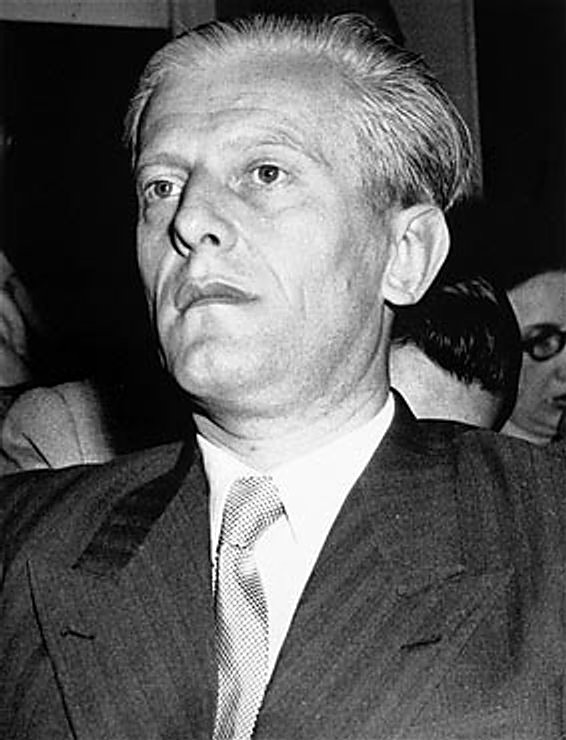
- Born: 26 March 1903; Schwetzingen, Baden, German Empire
- Died: 5 May 1958 (aged 55); Düsseldorf, West Germany
- Occupations: German Ambassador to France (1940–1944)
- Status: Deceased
- Conviction: Crimes against humanity
- Penalty: 20 years imprisonment
- SS service
- Allegiance: Nazi Germany
- Branch: Schutzstaffel
- Rank: SS-Brigadeführer

Otto Friedrich Abetz (26 March 1903 – 5 May 1958) was a German diplomat, a Nazi official and a convicted war criminal during World War II.

Abetz joined the Nazi Party and the SA in the early 1930s later becoming a member of the SS. In 1940, after the German occupation of France, he was appointed German ambassador to France and played a significant role in strengthening ties between Nazi Germany and the collaborationist Vichy government.

Abetz played a significant role in facilitating the persecution and deportation of Jews by the Nazi regime from France during the Holocaust. After Germany's defeat in 1945, Abetz was captured and later stood trial at the Nuremberg Trials. He was found guilty of war crimes and crimes against humanity, and was sentenced to 20 years in prison. He was released in 1954 for health reasons and died in a car crash in 1958.

== Early years ==
Abetz was born in Schwetzingen on 26 March 1903. He was the son of an estate manager, who died when he was 13. Abetz graduated in Karlsruhe, where he became an art teacher at a girls' school.

He joined the Hitler Youth where he became a close friend of Joachim von Ribbentrop. He was one of the founders of the Reichsbanner, the paramilitary arm of the Social Democrats, and was associated with groups such as the Black Front, a group of dissident National Socialists associated with Otto Strasser.

In his twenties Abetz started a Franco-German cultural group for youths, along with Jean Luchaire, known as the Sohlberg Congress. The group brought together German and French youth of all professions, social classes, political leanings, and religious affiliation. The group held their first conference in the Black Forest, and were frequently convened around ski slopes, campfires, and in hostels. The group maintained relations with the media through Luchaire's connection to Notre Temps, and Abetz started the Sohlberg Circle (Sohlbergkreis). In 1934 the Sohlberg Circle was reborn as the Franco-German Committee (Comité France-Allemagne), which included Pierre Drieu la Rochelle and Jacques Benoist-Mechin.

Abetz married Luchaire's French secretary, Susanne de Bruyker, in 1932.

== National Socialist period ==
Abetz "pledged his support" for the Nazi Party in 1931 and formally joined in 1937, the year he applied for the German Foreign Service. From 1938, he was representing Germany in Paris and joined the masonic lodge "Goethe" in 1939.

Abetz attended the Munich Conference in 1938, where he worked to inform and distract French journalists He was expelled from France in June 1939 following allegations he had bribed two French newspaper editors to write pro-German articles; his expulsion created a scandal in France when it emerged that the wife of the French Foreign Minister Georges Bonnet was a close friend of the two editors, which led to much lurid speculation in the French press that Bonnet had received bribes from Abetz, though no firm evidence has ever emerged to support the rumours.

Abetz was present in Adolf Hitler's entourage at the fall of Warsaw, and served as a translator for the German Führer. He returned to France in June 1940 following the German occupation and was assigned by Joachim von Ribbentrop to the embassy in Paris.

Following Hitler's June 30 directive, Abetz was assigned by Ribbentrop the looting of all objects of art, public, private, and especially Jewish-owned. Abetz announced to the Wehrmacht that the embassy had been "charged with the seizure of French works of art... and with the listing and seizure of works owned by Jews." On 17 September 1940 Hitler allowed Einsatzstab Rosenberg to take part and push Abetz out. The Pétain government protested Abetz's undertakings in late October, but by the end of October so much material had accumulated at the Louvre that it was decided more space was needed.

== Ambassador to Vichy France ==
In November 1940 Abetz was appointed to the German Embassy in Paris, in occupied France, at the age of 37 – a post he held until July 1944. He was also head of the French fifth columnists through Ribbentrop's special unit within the Foreign Service.

He advised the German military administration in Paris and was responsible for dealing with the Vichy Government. In May 1941, he negotiated the Paris Protocols to expand German access to French military facilities.

Abetz's antisemitic beliefs were a pivotal factor in his personal recruitment by Adolf Hitler. It was Abetz who proposed the deportation of stateless Jews to France's unoccupied zone and later to extermination camps in the East. Abetz assumed a prominent role in the deportation process, targeting both foreign Jewish refugees and French-born Jews, particularly after the occupation of southern France by Germany. On July 2, 1942, Abetz advocated for the deportation of 40,000 Jews from France to Auschwitz in a telegram, emphasising the need for comprehensive measures within both the occupied and unoccupied zones. This marked a turning point in his involvement in the Holocaust.

Abetz's primary objective was to secure complete collaboration from the French, through negotiations with Laval and Admiral Darlan. Abetz's function eventually evolved into becoming the catalyst for society, the arts, industry, education, and above all, propaganda. He played a pivotal role in the appointment of Pierre Drieu la Rochelle as director of La Nouvelle Revue française, which allowed him to exert direct influence in shaping French literature. In addition to running the German embassy in Paris, Abetz acquired the Château de Chantilly in the countryside. He often entertained guests in both these places, living and working like a self-styled autocrat. One of the guests, the French writer Louis-Ferdinand Céline, jokingly referred to him as "King Otto I", and France as "the Kingdom of Otto".

The Embassy was theoretically responsible for all political questions in occupied France, which included SD operations, and for advising the German police and military. Abetz advised the military, the Gestapo and the SD. As the official representative of the German Government with the rank of SS-Standartenführer (colonel), he created the German Institute headed by Karl Epting. Thirty thousand people signed up for the Institute's German language courses, the Institute's concerts featured Germany's best musicians, including Herbert von Karajan and the Berlin Philharmonic Orchestra.

Following the occupation of all France on 11 November 1942, von Ribbentrop's influence diminished as all of France was run by German military authorities, in conjunction with military police. A NSDAP Reichskommissariat of Belgien-Nordfrankreich held sway in several northern departments. Von Ribbentrop recalled Abetz in November following the occupation of all France. In his memoirs, Abetz assumed that he was considered "too francophile" and that his constant warnings about the loss of the French fleet and the loss of the French North Africa colonies were a thorn in the side of von Ribbentrop. The scuttling of the French fleet in Toulon on 27 November had ensured that the French would not join the Axis.

Abetz left France in September 1944 as the German armies withdrew, this despite claiming to Swedish consul-general Raoul Nordling on the seventh of the previous month that the Germans had neither killed political prisoners nor were making any plans to leave Paris.

== Trial, conviction and death ==
Abetz was arrested by Allied authorities in the Schwarzwald in October 1945. In the announcement of his arrest in France Soir, he was quoted as saying that Adolf Hitler was "certainly not dead", and "would return". A French court sentenced Abetz to 20 years' imprisonment for crimes against humanity. He was released from Loos prison on 17 April 1954.

He died on May 5, 1958, on the Cologne-Ruhr autobahn after being burned to death in an accident, involving his speeding car near Langenfeld. His wife also died in the accident. The car's steering failed and the ultimate cause of the accident could not be fully determined. The car had recently been given to him as a gift from a Frenchman.

== Relatives ==
A great-nephew, Eric Abetz, is an Australian conservative and a Liberal Party former member of the Australian Senate. He was at one time a cabinet minister in the government of Tony Abbott and has been a member of the Tasmanian Parliament since 2024. Another great-nephew of Otto, the Reverend Peter Abetz, a brother of Eric, was a member of the Western Australian Legislative Assembly, also representing the Liberal Party. Eric Abetz has publicly distanced himself from his Nazi relative.

== See also ==
- List SS-Brigadeführer
