= Ossie Lovelock =

Australian sportsman (1911–1981)

Personal information
- Full name: Oswald Ifould Lovelock
- Born: 28 August 1911; Highgate, Western Australia
- Died: 1 August 1981 (aged 69); Subiaco, Western Australia
- Batting: Right-handed
- Role: Wicket-keeper

Domestic team information
- Years: Team
- 1932/33–1939/40: Western Australia

Career statistics
Competition	First-class
Matches	22
Runs scored	750
Batting average	25.86
100s/50s	0/3
Top score	94*
Catches/stumpings	18/16
- Source: CricketArchive, 16 October 2011

Oswald Ifould Lovelock (28 August 1911 – 1 August 1981) was an Australian sportsman and sports administrator. He represented Western Australia at cricket and baseball, and also played football for West Perth in the West Australian National Football League (WANFL). In later life, he took up golf, winning several tournaments at clubs in Western Australia, and went on to serve as president of the Subiaco Football Club.

== Career ==
Born to Oswald Oliver Lovelock and his wife, Rose Janey (née Ifould), in Highgate on 28 August 1911, Lovelock played both cricket and football from an early age, representing Western Australia at a national schoolboys' carnival in 1926. He debuted for West Perth in the WANFL in 1932, and played in the club's 1932 premiership win. In total, he played 25 games for the club over three seasons from 1932 to 1934, kicking three goals, and also spent time with the club's reserve team in the West Australian National Football Association (WANFA).

He made his cricket debut for Western Australia in October 1932, against the touring MCC side, making 14 not out and recording two stumpings. He played another match six days later, this time for an Australian XI, featuring players such as Vic Richardson, Jack Fingleton and Don Bradman. He was Western Australia's first choice wicket-keeper throughout most of the 1930s, and served as vice-captain to Dick Bryant in most matches, captaining the side for one game against the MCC in 1936 when Bryant was unavailable. He played one match for a Western Australia Combined XI in 1936, featuring Jack Badcock, Stan McCabe and Clarrie Grimmett. In total, Lovelock played over 100 matches for West Perth and North Perth in the WACA District competition, making several centuries and captaining both clubs. As was common amongst Australian cricketers at the time, Lovelock played baseball during the winter to keep fit. A member of the Ramblers club in the Western Australia Baseball League, he played in the position of catcher, and was selected in the state team for Western Australia's first interstate match, against Victoria in September 19336.

In 1940, Lovelock was transferred first to Victoria for his job, where he played for Essendon in the Victorian Premier Cricket competition. In 1941, he was again transferred, to Tasmania, where he played for New Town in the TCA Grade Cricket competition. Returning to Western Australia in 1950, he took up golf, competing in several tournaments, and winning one, a stableford event held at Yokine. In 1951, he was elected to a position on the executive committee of the Western Australian Cricket Association. In 1952, he was appointed president of the Subiaco Football Club.
