= Electoral district of Gosnells =

Former state electoral district of Western Australia

Gosnells Western Australia—Legislative Assembly
- State: Western Australia
- Dates current: 1977–1989; 2008–2017
- Namesake: Gosnells
- Area: 24 km^{2} (9.3 sq mi)

Gosnells was an electoral district of the Legislative Assembly of Western Australia. It was in existence from 1977 to 1989 and from 2008 to 2017. The seat was named after the suburb of Gosnells, and was located in Perth's southeastern suburbs. Gosnells was a safe seat for the Labor Party for most of its existence.

== History ==
Gosnells was first created for the 1977 state election and abolished ahead of the 1989 state election. It was largely replaced by the district of Thornlie, which sitting Gosnells MP Yvonne Henderson contested and won. Gosnells was held at all times by the Labor Party.

A new seat named Gosnells was created for the 2008 state election when the number of metropolitan seats was increased in accordance with the new one vote one value legislation. The new district was drawn from large parts of the electorates of Kenwick, which was abolished, and Southern River, as well as a small part of Armadale. It included almost all of the suburb of Gosnells, large parts of the suburbs of Huntingdale and Thornlie and a small part of the suburb of Martin.

Gosnells was abolished for a second time in a redistribution prior to the 2017 state election. The sitting MP, Labor's Chris Tallentire, contested the new seat of Thornlie, while parts of Gosnells were also incorporated into Southern River.

== Members for Gosnells ==
Gosnells (1977–1989)
Member	Party	Term
Bob Pearce	Labor	1977–1983
Yvonne Henderson	Labor	1983–1989
Gosnells (2008–2017)
Chris Tallentire	Labor	2008–2017

== Election results ==
2013 Western Australian state election: Gosnells
Party	Candidate	Votes	%	±%
Labor	Chris Tallentire	9,237	44.8	+2.1
Liberal	David Goode	8,040	39.0	+2.6
Greens	Luke Edmonds	1,207	5.9	–6.4
Independent	Chris Fernandez	850	4.1	+4.1
Christians	Mark Staer	782	3.8	–0.7
Independent	Debbie Butler	501	2.4	+2.4
Total formal votes		20,617	92.5	−1.6
Informal votes		1,682	7.5	+1.6
Turnout		22,299	89.3	
Two-party-preferred result
Labor	Chris Tallentire	10,896	52.9	–1.9
Liberal	David Goode	9,701	47.1	+1.9
Labor hold		Swing	–1.9	
