= Terry Healy (politician) =

Australian politician

Terry Healy MLA

Member of the Western Australian Legislative Assembly for Southern River
- Incumbent
- Assumed office 11 March 2017
- Preceded by: Peter Abetz

Councillor for the City of Gosnells
- In office 17 October 2015 – 11 March 2017

Personal details
- Born: 1 September 1981 (age 44) South Perth, Western Australia
- Party: Labor
- Occupation: Teacher
- Website: www.terryhealy.com.au

Terence James Healy (born 1 September 1981) is an Australian politician. He has been a Labor member of the Western Australian Legislative Assembly since the 2017 state election, representing Southern River.

Healy worked as a teacher at Southern River College, and also served on Gosnells City Council.

Healy was re-elected in the 2025 Western Australian state election.

Western Australian Legislative Assembly
Preceded by Peter Abetz	Member for Southern River; 2017–present	Incumbent
