= Gosnells, Western Australia =

Gosnells
- Suburb
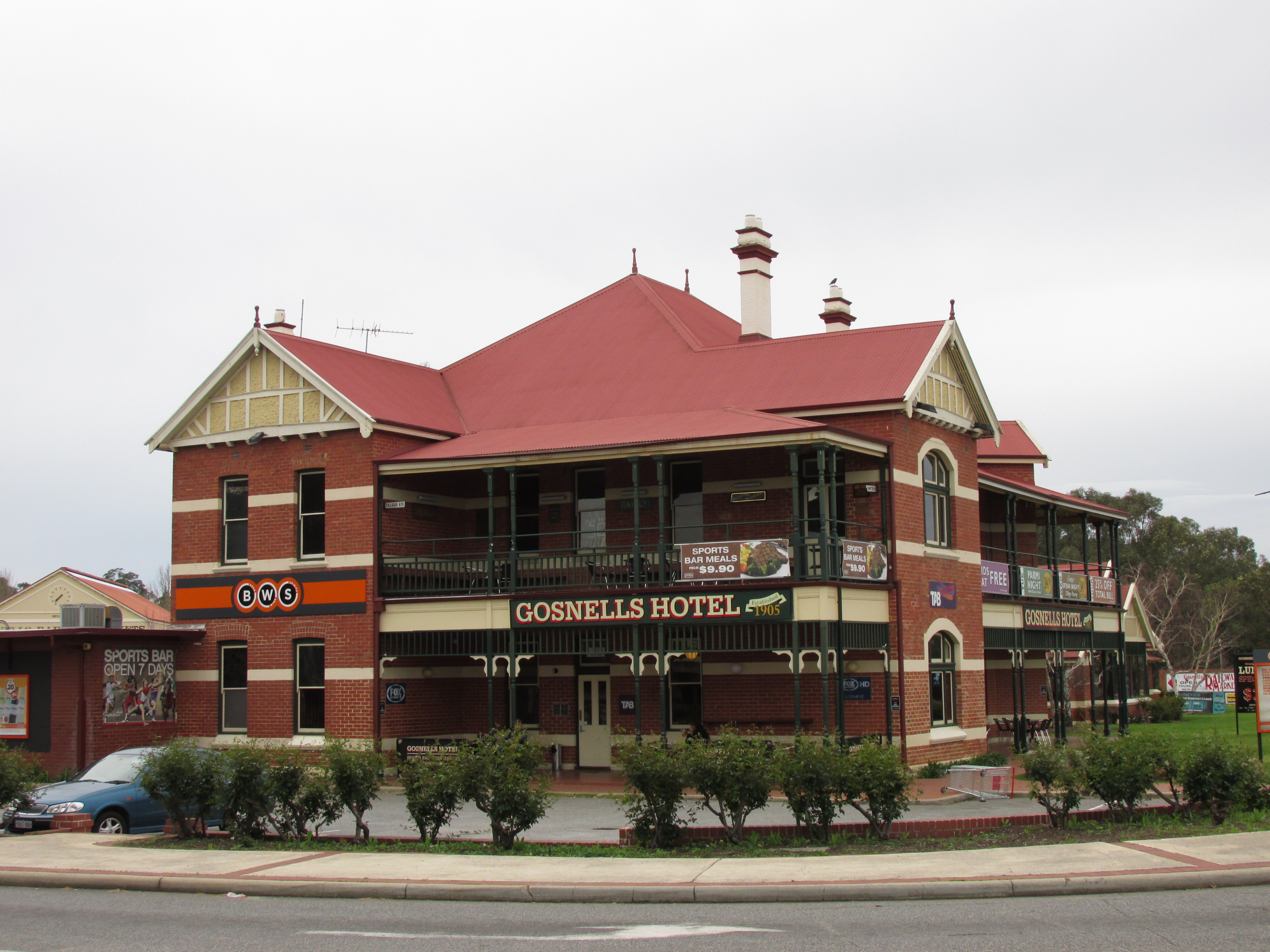
- Gosnells Hotel on Albany Highway
- Interactive map of Gosnells
- Coordinates: 32.072°S 115.995°E
- Country: Australia
- State: Western Australia
- City: Perth
- LGA: City of Gosnells
- Location: 20 km (12 mi) from Perth
- Established: 1890

Government
  - State electorates: Southern River; Thornlie
  - Federal division: Burt

Area
  - Total: 15.5 km^{2} (6.0 sq mi)

Population
  - Total: 21,149 (SAL 2021)
- Postcode: 6110
Suburbs around Gosnells
Thornlie	Maddington	Maddington
Huntingdale	Gosnells	Martin
Southern River	Champion Lakes	Kelmscott

Gosnells is a suburb located within the City of Gosnells. Gosnells is approximately 20 kilometres (12 mi) south-east of the Perth central business district. It contains the Gosnells town centre which includes the Council offices, library and the Gosnells Railway Station.

== History ==
The area where Gosnells is located was used by the Nyoongar Aboriginal people for thousands of years before European settlement. In 1829, when the European settlers arrived in Western Australia, farms were established along the Swan and Canning Rivers, significantly changing the landscape and terrain of Gosnells. In 1862, Charles Gosnell of London purchased the surrounding lands of Gosnells from the Davis Family. In 1890, Western Australia experienced an influx of residents from overseas and interstate due to the gold rush in Kalgoorlie and Coolgardie. This resulted in an increased demand for land on the outskirts of Perth and subsequently a group of developers bought the land (named "Canning Location 16") from the deceased estate of Gosnell. In 1907, the name "Gosnells" was adopted for the area.

Since 2000, government investment in the declining town centre has included new Council offices, a library and civic centre, the relocation of the Gosnells train station and the acquisition of blighted commercial properties. These projects have led to a revitalisation of commercial activity and a decline in crime and anti-social behaviour.

== Transport ==
=== Rail ===
Gosnells is served by Gosnells and Seaforth railway stations. These stations are on the suburban Perth to Armadale railway line, with trains departing approximately every 15 minutes to the city. Train services are more frequent during peak periods, with trains departing approximately every 5 to 10 minutes. These services are operated by the state-owned public transport company, Transperth. It takes approximately 23 minutes to travel from Gosnells to Perth by train.

- Armadale Line
  - Gosnells Station
  - Seaforth Station

=== Road ===
Albany Highway is the main link to Gosnells from the Perth central business district, and carries traffic northwest into the city, or southeast to Albany.

=== Bus ===
Gosnells has six bus routes, the 215, 216, 220, 228, 231 and the 232. The 215 and 216 goes to Thornlie. The 228 goes to Thornlie, via Maddington. The 231 and 232 goes around Gosnells, also known as the "Gosnells Loop". The 220 from Armadale travel to Gosnells from Perth.

- 215 Gosnells Station to Thornlie Station – serves Dorothy Street and Corfield Street
- 216 Gosnells Station to Thornlie Station – serves Wheatley Street and Fremantle Road
- 220 Perth Busport to Armadale Station – serves Albany Highway, Gosnells Station and Seaforth Station
- 228 Gosnells Station to Thornlie Station – serves Albany Highway, Fremantle Road and Wheatley Street
- 231 Gosnells Station to Gosnells Station – Anti-Clockwise Circular Route, serves Stalker Road, Eudoria Street, King Street, Anaconda Drive, Chamberlain Street, Verna Street, Harry Street, Ilma Street and Hicks Street
- 232 Gosnells Station to Gosnells Station – Clockwise Circular Route, serves Hicks Street, Verna Street, Ilma Street, Harry Street, Ashburton Drive, Southern River Road, Chamberlain Street, Anaconda Drive, King Street, Eudoria Street and Stalker Road
- 233 Gosnells Station to Cockburn Central Station – serves Dorothy Street and Southern River Road

== Climate ==
Gosnells has a Mediterranean climate (Köppen climate classification Csa), like the rest of Perth.

Climate data for Gosnells
Month	Jan	Feb	Mar	Apr	May	Jun	Jul	Aug	Sep	Oct	Nov	Dec	Year
Record high °C (°F)	44.4 (111.9)	46.0 (114.8)	43.3 (109.9)	39.5 (103.1)	35.5 (95.9)	26.1 (79.0)	27.0 (80.6)	28.0 (82.4)	34.8 (94.6)	38.2 (100.8)	41.5 (106.7)	44.2 (111.6)	46.0 (114.8)
Mean maximum °C (°F)	41.5 (106.7)	40.9 (105.6)	39.2 (102.6)	34.1 (93.4)	29.0 (84.2)	24.3 (75.7)	23.3 (73.9)	24.9 (76.8)	27.9 (82.2)	33.4 (92.1)	37.5 (99.5)	40.2 (104.4)	42.7 (108.9)
Mean daily maximum °C (°F)	33.0 (91.4)	33.0 (91.4)	30.5 (86.9)	26.5 (79.7)	22.7 (72.9)	19.8 (67.6)	18.7 (65.7)	19.4 (66.9)	20.9 (69.6)	24.1 (75.4)	27.7 (81.9)	30.5 (86.9)	25.6 (78.1)
Mean daily minimum °C (°F)	18.5 (65.3)	18.8 (65.8)	17.3 (63.1)	14.8 (58.6)	11.7 (53.1)	9.9 (49.8)	8.8 (47.8)	9.0 (48.2)	10.0 (50.0)	11.8 (53.2)	14.5 (58.1)	16.4 (61.5)	13.5 (56.3)
Mean minimum °C (°F)	12.3 (54.1)	13.1 (55.6)	10.9 (51.6)	8.7 (47.7)	6.0 (42.8)	4.4 (39.9)	3.3 (37.9)	3.7 (38.7)	4.6 (40.3)	6.0 (42.8)	9.2 (48.6)	10.8 (51.4)	2.4 (36.3)
Record low °C (°F)	9.5 (49.1)	9.8 (49.6)	6.5 (43.7)	4.0 (39.2)	2.5 (36.5)	0.5 (32.9)	0.5 (32.9)	2.2 (36.0)	2.0 (35.6)	3.2 (37.8)	6.5 (43.7)	8.0 (46.4)	0.5 (32.9)
Average rainfall mm (inches)	10.8 (0.43)	15.6 (0.61)	16.5 (0.65)	41.7 (1.64)	101.6 (4.00)	164.8 (6.49)	159.9 (6.30)	125.5 (4.94)	79.8 (3.14)	45.2 (1.78)	28.5 (1.12)	11.4 (0.45)	804.3 (31.67)
Average precipitation days	1.9	2.2	3.5	6.3	10.9	14.4	16.2	14.2	11.6	7.7	4.8	2.8	96.5
Average afternoon relative humidity (%) (at 15:00)	38	37	41	48	53	61	61	60	56	49	46	41	49
Source: Bureau of Meteorology; Temperatures: 1991–2020; Rain data: 1961–2020; Relative humidity: 1992–2010

== Notable residents ==
- Gerald Arthur - cricketer
- Chris Tallentire - politician
- Mitch Wishnowsky - American football player
