= Paul Andrews (Australian politician) =

Australian politician

Member of the Western Australian Parliament for Southern River
- In office 10 February 2001 – 6 September 2008
- Preceded by: Monica Holmes
- Succeeded by: Peter Abetz

Personal details
- Born: 11 November 1955 Bunbury, Western Australia
- Died: 22 October 2009 (aged 53)
- Party: Labor Party
- Spouse: Gim-Hoon Andrews
- Profession: Teacher

Paul William Andrews (11 November 1955 – 22 October 2009) was an Australian politician. He was a Labor member of the Western Australian Legislative Assembly from 2001 to 2008, representing the electorate of Southern River.

Andrews entered parliament at the 2001 state election by defeating sitting Liberal MP Monica Holmes. He won re-election at the 2005 state election by defeating Holmes a second time. Seeking a third term at the 2008 state election, Andrews lost his seat to Liberal candidate Peter Abetz.

Andrews had also battled kidney disease for years and championed organ transplant in the Western Australian State Parliament for his two terms. Andrews also voiced his passion for reform to the organ donation transplant laws in Western Australia.

Andrews died on 22 October 2009 from cancer at the age of 53, leaving behind a wife and three adult children.

Parliament of Western Australia
Preceded by Monica Holmes	Member for Southern River; 2001–2008	Succeeded by Peter Abetz
