= Electoral district of Kenwick =

Former federal electoral district of Perth, Western Australia

Kenwick Western Australia—Legislative Assembly
- State: Western Australia
- Dates current: 1989–1996; 2005–2008
- Namesake: Kenwick

Kenwick was an electoral district of the Legislative Assembly in the Australian state of Western Australia from 1989 to 1996 and again from 2005 to 2008.

Both incarnations of the district were based in the south-eastern suburbs of Perth and were safe for the Labor Party.

== History ==
Kenwick was first contested at the 1989 state election. The seat was won by Labor candidate Judyth Watson. It was abolished two terms later and Watson unsuccessfully contested the new seat of Southern River at the 1996 state election.

A new seat called Kenwick was created for the 2005 state election. The new district was created from territory formerly belonging to Belmont, Southern River, Roleystone and Thornlie; the latter two of which were abolished. Kenwick was itself abolished one term later, ahead of the 2008 state election. Its member for that term was Labor MP Sheila McHale, formerly the member for Thornlie. At its abolition, Kenwick's former territory was divided between the new seats of Cannington, Forrestfield, Gosnells and Kalamunda. McHale retired at the 2008 election.

== Geography ==
Kenwick, in its second and most recent incarnation, spanned both sides of the Canning River in the south-eastern part of Perth. The district included the suburbs of Kenwick, Beckenham, Maddington, and parts of the suburbs of East Cannington, Wattle Grove, Langford, Thornlie, Gosnells and Martin.

== Members for Kenwick ==
Kenwick (1989–1996)
| Member | Party | Term |
|---|---|---|
| Judyth Watson | Labor | 1989–1996 |
Kenwick (2005–2008)
| Member | Party | Term |
| Sheila McHale | Labor | 2005–2008 |
