= Electoral district of Thornlie =

State electoral district of Perth, Western Australia

Thornlie Western Australia—Legislative Assembly
- Interactive map of electoral district boundaries from the 2025 state election
- State: Western Australia
- Dates current: 1989–2005, 2017–present
- MP: Colleen Egan
- Party: Labor
- Namesake: Thornlie
- Electors: 31,959 (2025)
- Area: 69 km^{2} (26.6 sq mi)
- Demographic: Metropolitan
- Coordinates: 32.06°S 115.97°E
Electorates around Thornlie:
Cannington	Forrestfield	Kalamunda
Jandakot	Thornlie	Kalamunda
Southern River	Armadale	Darling Range

Thornlie is an electoral district of the Legislative Assembly of Western Australia. It is located in Perth's southeastern suburbs, and is named after the suburb of Thornlie.

Thornlie was first created for the 1989 state election. It was abolished in a redistribution prior to the 2005 election, but was recreated for the 2017 election to replace the abolished seat of Gosnells. When Thornlie recreated it had a notional 1.8-point majority for the Labor Party (based on the results of the 2013 election), and was considered a marginal seat.

== History ==
Thornlie was first created for the 1989 state election. It largely replaced the abolished district of Gosnells and was won by incumbent Gosnells MP Yvonne Henderson. It was held at all times by the Labor Party.

The district was abolished ahead of the 2005 state election. At that time, it included the entirety of the suburbs of Thornlie and Langford as well as parts of the suburbs of Canning Vale, Ferndale, Kenwick, Lynwood and Maddington. Its territory was divided between the existing districts of Riverton and Southern River, as well as the new district of Kenwick. Sitting MP Sheila McHale contested and won the seat of Kenwick.

Upon its recreation prior to the 2017 state election, Thornlie had a notional 1.8-point majority for the Labor Party. Incumbent Gosnells MP Chris Tallentire contested Thornlie and won the seat with a 14% swing in his favour, thus making Thornlie a safe Labor seat.

== Members for Thornlie ==
First incarnation (1989–2005)
Member	Party	Term
Yvonne Henderson	Labor	1989–1996
Sheila McHale	Labor	1996–2005
Second incarnation (2017–present)
Chris Tallentire	Labor	2017–2025
Colleen Egan	Labor	2025–present

== Election results ==
2025 Western Australian state election: Thornlie
Party	Candidate	Votes	%	±%
Labor	Colleen Egan	11,574	46.5	−27.4
Liberal	Mahesh Arumugam	3,761	15.1	+1.0
Greens	Adam Abdul Razak	2,644	10.6	+5.7
Independent	Kevin McDonald	2,548	10.2	+10.2
One Nation	Timothy Larcombe	2,072	8.3	+8.3
Christians	Madeleine Goiran	1,344	5.4	+1.1
Legalise Cannabis	Fred Mulholland	959	3.9	+3.9
Total formal votes		24,902	94.2	−1.7
Informal votes		1,544	5.8	+1.7
Turnout		26,446	82.7	+5.0
Notional two-party-preferred count (Note: Estimated two-party-preferred count by Antony Green.)
Labor	Colleen Egan	17,246	69.3	−11.2
Liberal	Mahesh Arumugam	7,630	30.7	+11.2
Two-candidate-preferred result
Labor	Colleen Egan	15,916	64.0	−16.6
Independent	Kevin McDonald	8,952	36.0	+36.0
Labor hold				
