= Peter Abetz =

Australian former politician

The Reverend Cr Peter Abetz

Councillor for the City of Gosnells
- Incumbent
- Assumed office 16 October 2017

Deputy Mayor of Gosnells
- In office 21 October 2019 – 18 October 2021
- Mayor: Terresa Lynes
- Preceded by: Terresa Lynes
- Succeeded by: Adam Hort

Member of the Western Australian Parliament for Southern River
- In office 6 September 2008 – 11 March 2017
- Preceded by: Paul Andrews
- Succeeded by: Terry Healy

Personal details
- Born: 17 December 1952 (age 73) Stuttgart, Germany
- Party: Liberal Party (state politics); Independent (local politics)
- Relations: Eric Abetz; Otto Abetz
- Occupation: Minister of religion
- Website: http://www.peterabetz.com

Peter Abetz (born 17 December 1952) is an Australian former politician who was a Liberal member of the Western Australian Legislative Assembly from 2008 to 2017, representing Southern River.

== Biography ==
Abetz is one of six children. His parents migrated to Tasmania from Germany in 1961. His father, a radio technician, decided to emigrate after reading in a newspaper that a trade mission led by the minister responsible for the Tasmanian Hydro-Electric Commission was visiting Stuttgart in search of skilled workers for employment in "The Hydro's" power projects, on which his father subsequently worked. Abetz's younger brother, Eric Abetz has represented the state of Tasmania in the Australian Senate since 1994, serving as a minister in the Howard and Abbott governments. Abetz is the great-nephew of convicted Nazi war criminal, SS-Brigadeführer Otto Abetz, Nazi German ambassador to Vichy France from 1940 to 1944. He is also related on his mother's side to German field marshal Erwin Rommel.

Abetz attended Moonah and Blackmans Bay State Schools, completed his high schooling at Taroona High School and matriculated in one year at Hobart Matriculation College in 1969. He holds a Bachelor of Agricultural Science (Hons) degree from the University of Tasmania and a Bachelor of Divinity from the Reformed Theological College in Geelong. He is married to Jenny (née Hoogenhout) and has five adult children.

In 1974, Peter Abetz worked as a farm advisory officer in the Tasmanian Department of Agriculture based in Huonville, before running a small statewide rural supplies business. After completing a Bachelor of Divinity, he was ordained as a pastor in the Christian Reformed Churches of Australia and served in that capacity for 25 years before entering Parliament. He served congregations in Dandenong, Victoria, Willetton, Western Australia and North Beach, Western Australia. On being elected to parliament he took up residence in the electorate of Southern River.

== State political career ==
Abetz ran as a candidate for the Labor-held Legislative Assembly seat of Southern River in the 2008 Western Australian state election. He defeated the sitting member, Paul Andrews.

Abetz served as a member of the Education & Health Standing Committee of the Legislative Assembly in his first term. From 2013, he served as the Chair of the Joint Standing Committee on Delegation Legislation.

In November 2009 Abetz supported legislation to give police the power to search individuals for illicit weapons or drugs, without suspicion or belief that a crime had been committed. Abetz referenced Adolf Hitler's rise to power as an example of people's preference for security, later saying "When it comes to the crunch, people prefer to be safe than to have freedom". Premier of Western Australia Colin Barnett said that Abetz was making a valid point.

In 2010 he introduced a private member's bill for the purpose of providing additional protection to franchisees. The Bill proceeded to the second reading stage, but was defeated in November 2011 on the casting vote of the Speaker. As a Christian, Abetz has been called one of "God's squad" in the WA Parliament for his eagerness to mention his faith in his public life.

At the 2013 state election he achieved a 15% swing, holding his seat with 67% of the two-party-preferred vote. Following redistributed boundaries, he suffered a defeat the 2017 state election he suffered a swing of 20.8%, the largest against any sitting member.

Abetz opposed same-sex marriage.

== After state politics ==
Abetz was elected as a Councillor for the City of Gosnells in 2017, and became Deputy Mayor of the City in 2019.

In 2018, Abetz was appointed as the WA State Director for the Australian Christian Lobby. Abetz raised concerns regarding surrogacy and specifically the deprivation for children of a mother or father.

== See also ==
- Australian Christian Lobby

Western Australian Legislative Assembly
Preceded by Paul Andrews	Member for Southern River; 2008–2017	Succeeded by Terry Healy
