= Albany Regional Prison =

Prison in Western Australia

Coordinates: 35°02′38″S 117°49′4″E

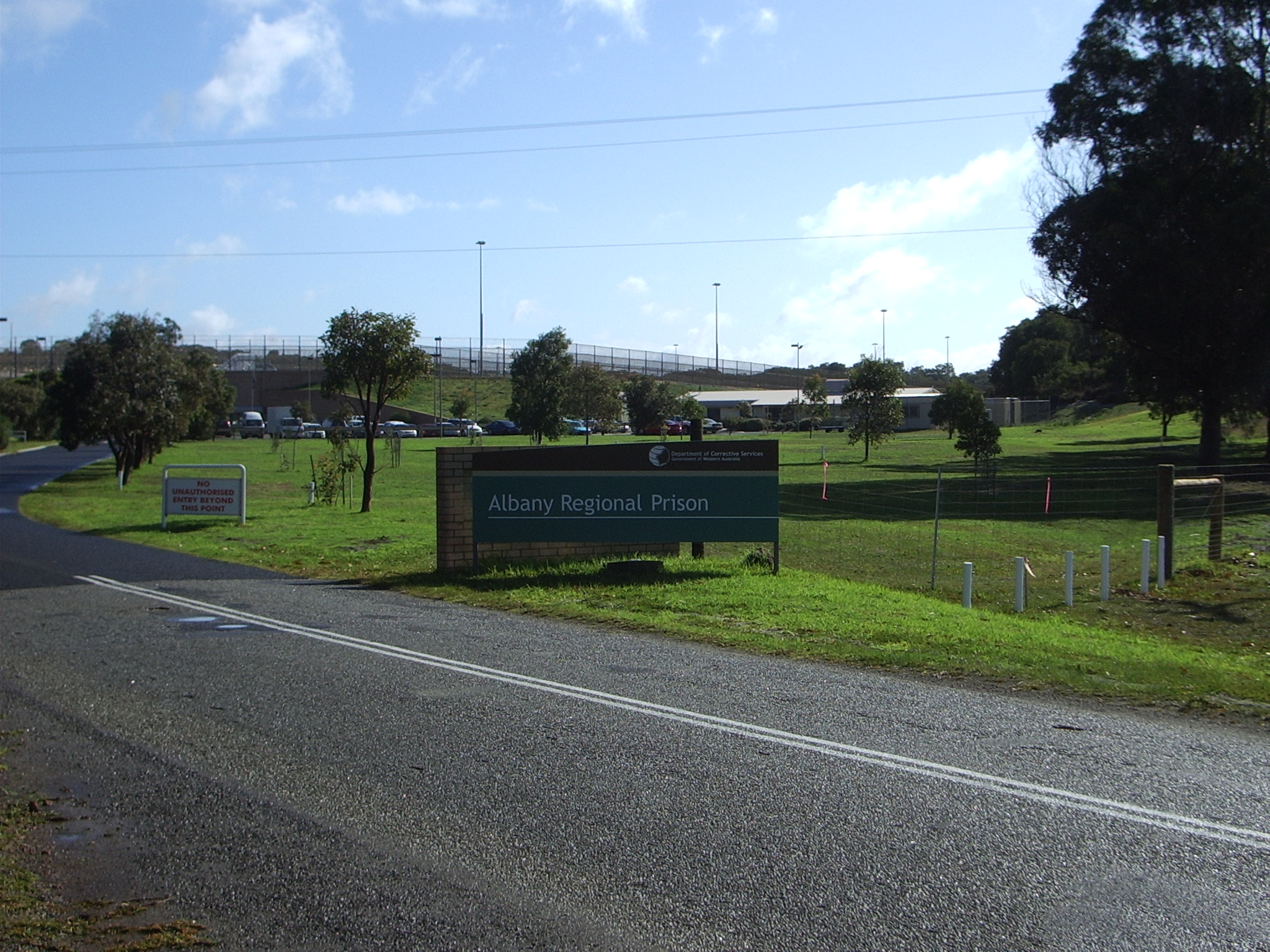
- Interactive map of Albany Regional Prison
- Location: Albany, Western Australia
- Status: Operational
- Security class: Mixed (male)
- Capacity: 310, plus work camp
- Opened: 16 September 1966
- Managed by: Department of Justice, Western Australia

Albany Regional Prison is a maximum security prison located 8 km West of Albany, Western Australia. Albany Prison was commissioned in 1966 with a capacity of 72 minimum security cells. In 1979 it was upgraded to maximum security and in 1988 expanded to a capacity of 126. In 1993 it expanded again, to 186 standard-bed cells and by 2013 to 310.

Albany Prison is the only maximum-security prison outside Perth and manages maximum, medium and minimum-security prisoners and holds a significant number of long-term prisoners originally from other countries.

Since 1996 Albany prison has been responsible for administering the nearby the Pardelup and Walpole work camps.

The prisoners are able to study full-time in various subjects or work in one of the various workshops that are part of the prison.

A prison officer, Anthony Daniels, was stabbed four times during an escape attempt by two prisoners in 1994. Officer Daniels received a Prison Service Bravery Award in 2000.

On 29 December 2010, minimum security inmate Shane Gibbs escaped by driving off in a utility vehicle.

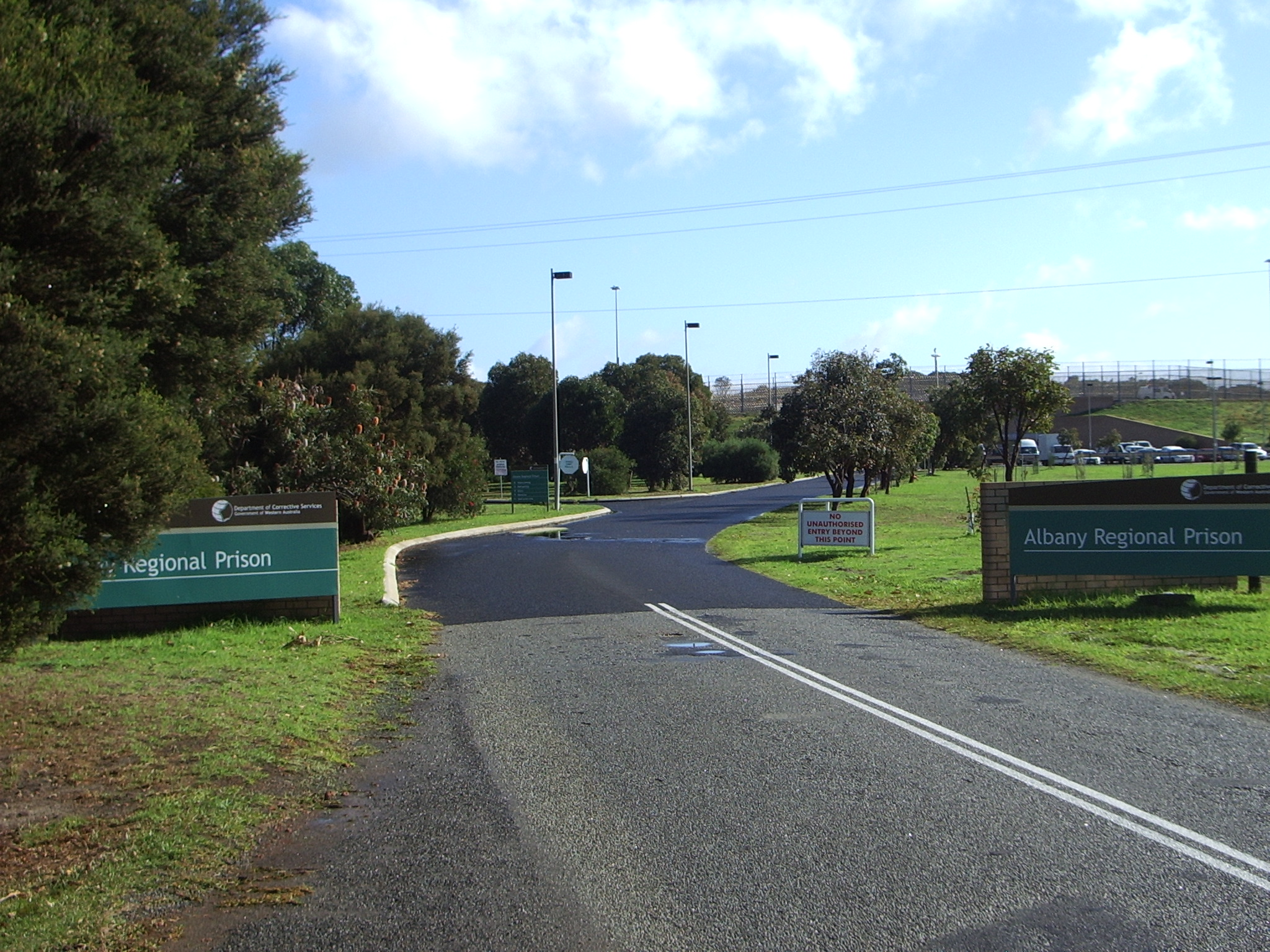
View to entrance of Albany Regional Prison

In an inspection in 2024 it was found that the prison had staffing shortages that affected daily operations. The report also said that the prison had aging infrastructure that was under pressure.
