= Colleen Egan =

Australian journalist and politician

Colleen Egan MLA

Member of the Western Australian Legislative Assembly for Thornlie
- Incumbent
- Assumed office 8 March 2025
- Preceded by: Chris Tallentire

Personal details
- Born: 1966 or 1967 (age 58–59) Perth, Western Australia
- Party: Labor
- Occupation: Politician; journalist; political staffer

Colleen Egan is an Australian politician and former journalist. She is member of the Western Australian Legislative Assembly for the electoral district of Thornlie. A member of the Labor Party, she won her seat at the 2025 Western Australian state election. Egan was editor at The West Australian newspaper and notably played a role in obtaining the acquittal of Andrew Mallard, who had been wrongfully convicted of murder, for which she won a Walkley Award in 2006. She also unwittingly contributed to the political downfall of Western Australian Liberal powerbroker Noel Crichton-Browne when he made inappropriate sexual comments to her at a Liberal Party conference.

== History ==
Egan, who has principally been employed as a print journalist by The Sunday Times, first established herself as an investigative journalist in 2000 when her exclusive interviews with terrorist Jack Roche were published in The Australian. Her work has since taken her to London, covering trials at the Old Bailey, and back to Perth as a weekly columnist for The Sunday Times. She is now Chief of Staff for WA Attorney General John Quigley.

Egan was approached in 1998 by the family of Andrew Mallard who had been convicted and detained in 1995 for the murder of jeweller Pamela Lawrence. Her subsequent investigations revealed that Mallard's conviction had been largely based on a forced confession. Her book on the case, Murderer No More: Andrew Mallard and the Epic Fight that Proved his Innocence, was published by Allen & Unwin in June 2010.

Egan worked as chief of staff for Western Australian Attorney-General John Quigley from 2017 to 2023, and ran a candidate for the seat of Thornlie in the 2025 Western Australian state election. In the 2025 Western Australian state election, she was elected in Thornlie, succeeding Chris Tallentire.

== Awards ==
- Walkley Award for Most Outstanding Contribution to Journalism for 2006 for her role in the acquittal of Andrew Mallard.
- News Limited's 2007 Sir Keith Murdoch Award for Journalism, also for the eight-year investigation that led to the acquittal of Andrew Mallard.
- 2011, Davitt Award for Murderer No More

== See also ==
- Estelle Blackburn
