= State School Teachers Union of Western Australia =

Western Australian teachers trade union

State School Teachers' Union of Western Australia
- SSTUWA Logo

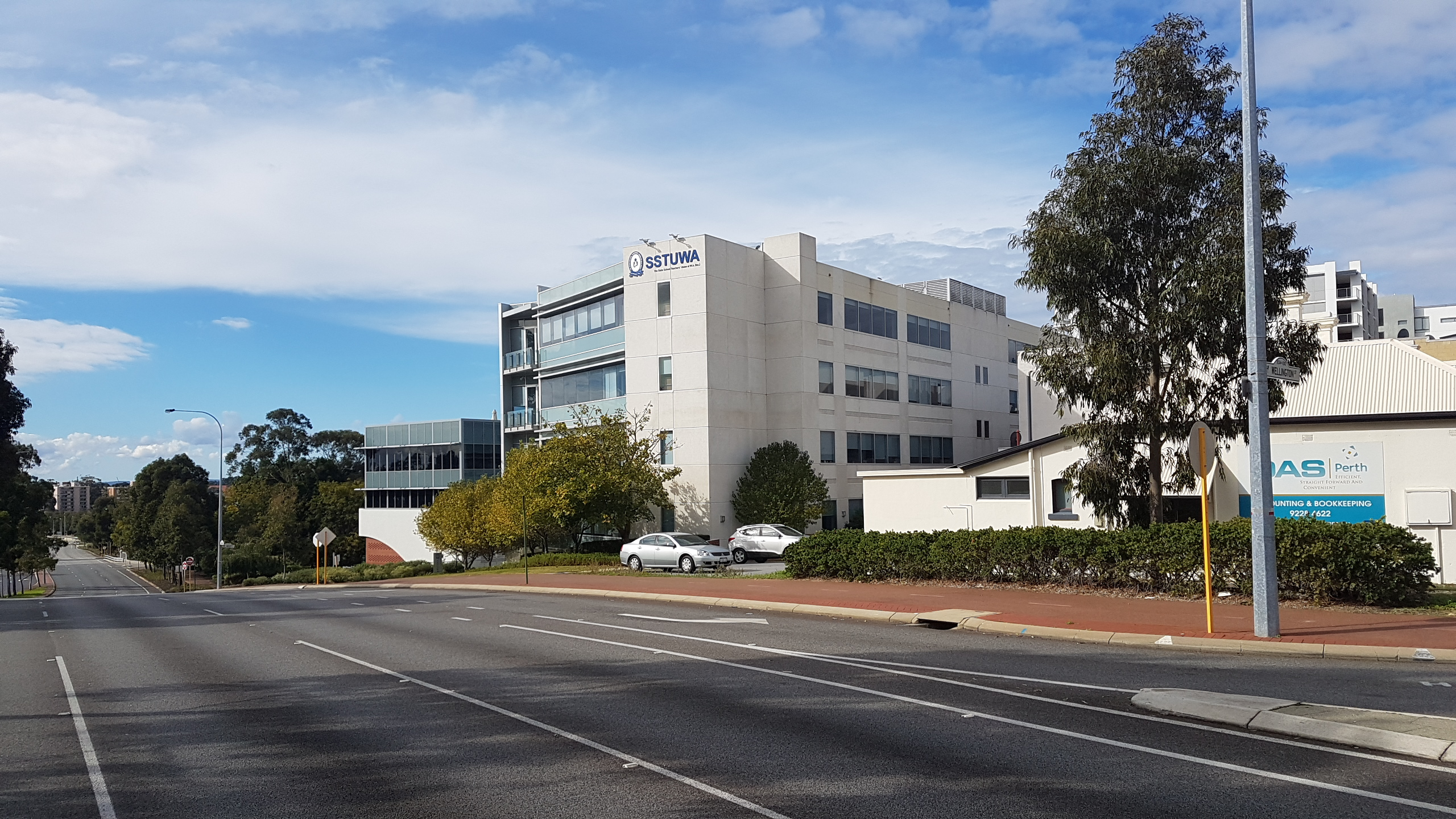
- SSTUWA Building in West Perth
- Trade name: SSTUWA
- Company type: Industrial Union
- Founded: 1898
- Headquarters: 1 West St, West Perth, Western Australia 6005
- Key people: Matt Jarman (President); Sally Dennis (General Secretary)
- Website: www.sstuwa.org.au

The State School Teachers' Union of W.A. (SSTUWA) is an Australian trade union. It represents teachers working in the Western Australian state school system, which includes public schools and TAFE institutes, and is affiliated with the federal Australian Education Union.

The union has been in continuous existence since 1898.

== Purpose ==
The SSTUWA has a number of roles, including

- Negotiating conditions of employment and salaries, with the Department of Education, for public school teachers working under the School Education Act Employees' Agreement (Teachers and Administrators).
- Negotiating conditions of employment and salaries for TAFE lecturers working under the Western Australian TAFE Lectures' General Agreement.
- Advocating for improvements in the Western Australian state school system at a local, state and federal level.
