= Monica Holmes =

Australian politician

- Born: Monica Rose Blagrove; 25 June 1944 (age 81); Bushey, Hertfordshire, England
- Occupation: Politician

Monica Rose Holmes, née Blagrove (born 1944) is an English-born Australian politician.

== Biography ==
=== Early life ===
Monica Holmes was born in Bushey in Hertfordshire, England on 25 June 1944. She emigrated to Western Australia in 1983.

=== Career ===
She worked as a self-employed hotelier and an executive with the Chamber of Commerce and Industry.

In 1996, she was elected to the Western Australian Legislative Assembly as the Liberal member for the new seat of Southern River. She was Deputy Chairman of Committees from 1997 to 1999 and Acting Speaker from 1999 to 2001, when she lost her seat.

Western Australian Legislative Assembly
New seat	Member for Southern River; 1996–2001	Succeeded by Paul Andrews
