= Chris Tallentire =

Australian politician

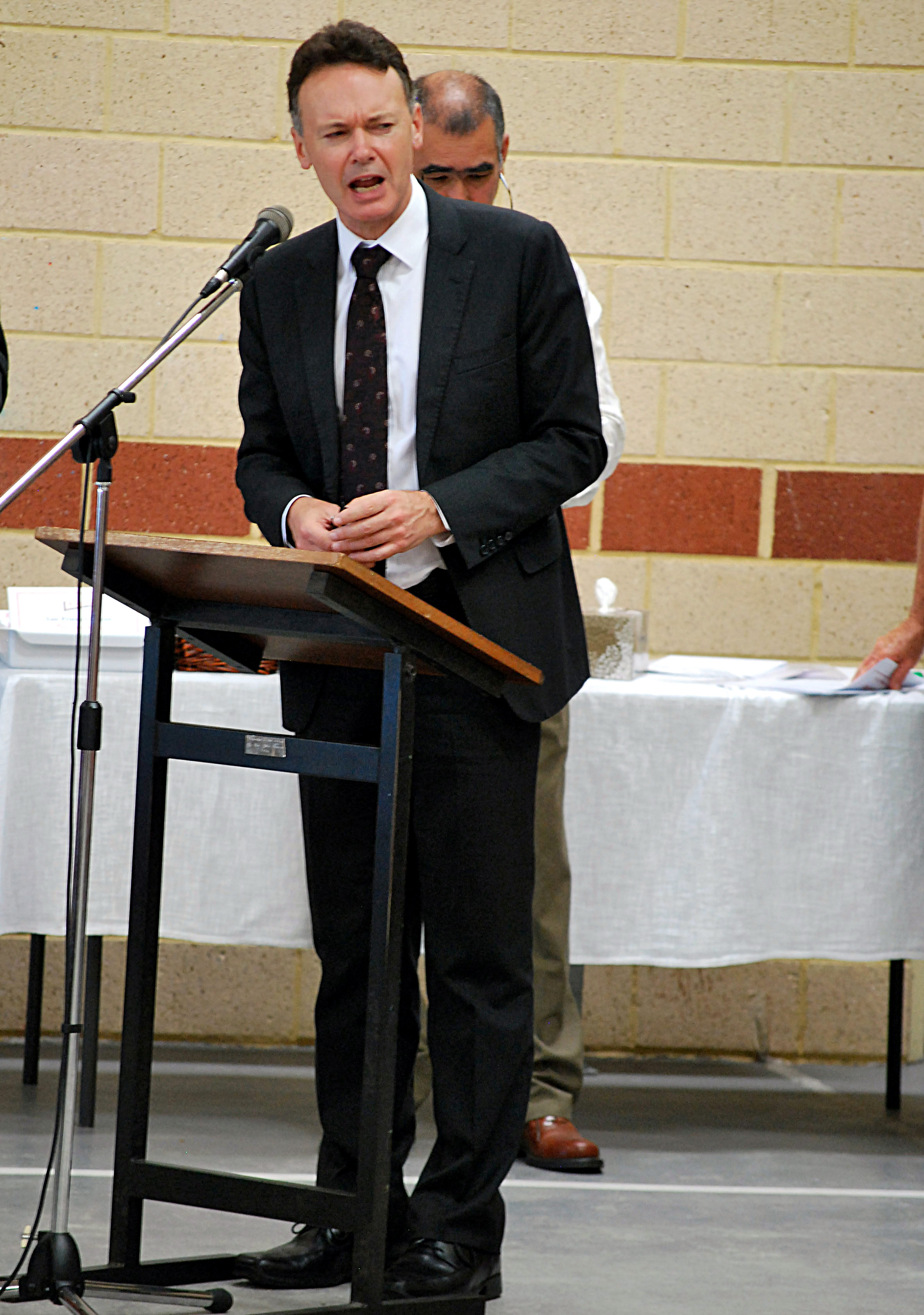

Member of the Western Australian Parliament for Gosnells
- In office 6 September 2008 – 11 March 2017
- Preceded by: New seat
- Succeeded by: Seat abolished

Member of the Western Australian Parliament for Thornlie
- In office 11 March 2017 – 6 February 2025
- Preceded by: New seat
- Succeeded by: Colleen Egan

Personal details
- Born: Christopher John Tallentire; 11 October 1963 (age 63) Middlesbrough, England
- Citizenship: Australian
- Party: Labor
- Website: www.christallentire.com

Christopher John Tallentire (born 11 October 1963) is an Australian politician. He was a Labor Party member of the Western Australian Legislative Assembly from the 2008 state election, representing Gosnells until 2017 and Thornlie from 2017 until 2025. Prior to his election, Tallentire was the director of the Conservation Council of Western Australia from March 2004 to April 2008. He holds a Bachelor of Agribusiness Marketing.

In September 2024, Tallentire raised concerns regarding amendments to legislation relating to the Environmental Protection Authority.

In February 2024, Tallentire announced he would not be re-contesting his seat at the 2025 state election.

Tallentire is a member of the United Workers Union and the Labor Left faction.

Western Australian Legislative Assembly
New seat	Member for Gosnells; 2008–2017	Abolished
New seat	Member for Thornlie; 2017–2025	Succeeded by Colleen Egan
