= Judyth Watson =

Australian politician

The Honourable Judyth Watson OAM, PhD

Minister for Aboriginal Affairs; Multicultural and Ethnic Affairs; Seniors
- In office 27 February 1991 – 16 February 1993
- Premier: Carmen Lawrence
- Preceded by: Pam Buchanan; Carmen Lawrence
- Succeeded by: Kevin Minson; Graham Kierath

Minister for Women's Interests
- In office 7 September 1992 – 16 February 1993
- Premier: Carmen Lawrence
- Preceded by: Carmen Lawrence
- Succeeded by: Cheryl Edwardes

Member of the Western Australian Parliament for Kenwick
- In office 4 February 1989 – 14 December 1996
- Preceded by: New creation
- Succeeded by: Seat abolished

Member of the Western Australian Parliament for Canning
- In office 8 February 1986 – 4 February 1989
- Preceded by: Tom Bateman
- Succeeded by: Seat abolished

Personal details
- Born: Judyth Watson; 8 March 1940 Burton on Trent, England
- Died: 9 July 2023 (aged 83) Perth, Western Australia
- Citizenship: Australia
- Party: Labor Party
- Education: University of Western Australia
- Occupation: Nurse

Judyth Watson OAM (8 March 1940 – 9 July 2023) was an Australian politician.

== Early life ==
Watson was born in Burton-on-Trent, England to Cecil and Hylda Watson in 1940. She emigrated to Australia in 1949 and went to school at Perth Modern School. After working as a nurse, Watson completed a Bachelor of Science degree in 1977. In 1981 she completed a PhD studying workers compensation.

== Political career ==
In 1986 Watson was elected to the Western Australian Legislative Assembly for the electorate of Canning. On election she and Carmen Lawrence were the first female members of the WA Parliament to hold a PhD.

Watson was appointed Minister for Aboriginal Affairs; Multicultural and Ethnic Affairs; and Seniors in February 1991 under Premier Carmen Lawrence. She was appointed Minister for Women's Interests in September 1992. She served in Cabinet until February 1993.

When the electorate was dissolved in 1989 she was elected to the electorate of Kenwick. After serving two terms, the seat was abolished and she unsuccessfully stood for the new electorate of Southern River.

Watson was awarded the Medal of the Order of Australia (OAM) in the 2019 Queen's Birthday Honours for "service to the community of Western Australia, and to social justice".
