= Electoral district of Southern River =

State electoral district of Perth, Western Australia

Southern River Western Australia—Legislative Assembly
- Interactive map of electoral district boundaries from the 2025 state election
- State: Western Australia
- Dates current: 1996–present
- MP: Terry Healy
- Party: Labor
- Namesake: Southern River
- Electors: 32,711 (2025)
- Area: 35 km^{2} (13.5 sq mi)
- Demographic: Metropolitan
- Coordinates: 32.08°S 115.87°E
Electorates around Southern River:
Cannington	Thornlie	Thornlie
Jandakot	Southern River	Armadale
Oakford	Oakford	Armadale

Southern River is an electoral district of the Legislative Assembly in the state of Western Australia.

The district is a marginal seat based in the southern suburbs of Perth.

== Geography ==
Southern River is an electorate situated in Perth's southern suburbs. The district includes the suburbs of Southern River and Huntingdale, as well as parts of the suburbs of Canning Vale and Gosnells.

== History ==
Southern River was first contested at the 1996 state election. The seat was won by Liberal Party candidate Monica Holmes who defeated Labor candidate Judyth Watson, the latter being at the time member for the abolished Kenwick. Holmes was defeated at the 2001 state election by Labor candidate Paul Andrews.

The redistribution ahead of the 2005 state election shifted Southern River eastward, making the seat safer for the Labor Party. That election saw Paul Andrews defeat Monica Holmes a second time, with a much wider margin in large part due to the redistribution changes. The next redistribution saw much of the previous changes reversed, making Southern River once again a marginal seat. With Labor's hold on the seat now much more tenuous, Andrews was defeated at the 2008 state election by Liberal candidate Peter Abetz. Abetz held the seat through the 2013 state election but lost to Labor's Terry Healy at the 2017 state election.

== Members for Southern River ==
Member	Party	Term
Monica Holmes	Liberal	1996–2001
Paul Andrews	Labor	2001–2008
Peter Abetz	Liberal	2008–2017
Terry Healy	Labor	2017–present

== Election results ==
2025 Western Australian state election: Southern River
Party	Candidate	Votes	%	±%
Labor	Terry Healy	15,693	58.5	+12.6
Liberal	Sudhir Chowdhary	4,405	16.4	−19.5
Greens	Angela Hecquet	2,103	7.8	+2.0
Christians	Alvin Mathew Vadakkedathu	1,190	4.4	+4.4
One Nation	Ingrid Parkin	1,174	4.4	+4.4
Legalise Cannabis	Graham Pereira	1,068	4.0	+4.0
Independent	Glenn P. W. Dewhurst	637	2.4	+2.4
Independent	Simon Simson	295	1.1	+1.1
Shooters, Fishers, Farmers	Caleb Thomas	263	1.0	+1.0
Total formal votes		26,828	94.7	−1.3
Informal votes		1,504	5.3	+1.3
Turnout		28,332	86.6	+4.8
Two-party-preferred result
Labor	Terry Healy	19,658	73.4	−9.8
Liberal	Sudhir Chowdhary	7,142	26.6	+9.8
Labor hold		Swing	−9.8	
