= Sheila McHale =

Australian politician

Sheila McHale AM
- In office 14 December 1996 – 6 September 2008
- Preceded by: Yvonne Henderson
- Succeeded by: Chris Tallentire
- Constituency: Kenwick

Personal details
- Born: Yorkshire England
- Party: Labor Party
- Education: BA Dip Soc Sci
- Profession: Employee Relations Manager

Sheila Margaret McHale AM (born 1 September 1953) is a former Labor Party MP in the Government of Western Australia. Prior to retirement, she served as Member for Kenwick and Minister for Disability Services, Tourism, Culture and the Arts, and Consumer Protection.

Born in Yorkshire, England she emigrated to Western Australia in 1978. She was first elected to State Parliament in 1996 and served as the Shadow Minister for Health, the Arts and Heritage. During this period, she spent three years as an elected councillor for the City of South Perth.

In 2001, she was re-elected to state parliament as Gallop took power and undertook the position of Cabinet Minister, as Minister for Community Development, Women's Interests, Tourism, Seniors and Youth; Disability Services; and Culture and the Arts.

In March 2008, McHale announced that she would retire and not contest the upcoming State election. In the 2008 election the seat of Kenwick was abolished and replaced with the seat of Gosnells. Chris Tallentire was preselected and won the new seat for the ALP despite a swing of 5.9% against them.

McHale was appointed a Member of the Order of Australia in the 2024 Australia Day Honours for "significant service to the people and Parliament of Western Australia, and to the community".
