= Electoral results for the district of Rockingham =

Western Australian district election results

This is a list of electoral results for the electoral district of Rockingham in Western Australian state elections.

== Members for Rockingham ==
Member	Party	Term
Mike Barnett	Labor	1974–1996
Mark McGowan	Labor	1996–2023
Magenta Marshall	Labor	2023–present

== Election results ==
=== Elections in the 2020s ===
2025 Western Australian state election: Rockingham
Party	Candidate	Votes	%	±%
Labor	Magenta Marshall	11,581	46.5	−36.2
Liberal	Hayley Edwards	6,660	26.8	+17.0
Greens	Robert Delves	1,981	8.0	+4.8
One Nation	Cristina Oregioni	1,551	6.2	+4.2
Legalise Cannabis	Phillip Leslie	1,215	4.9	+4.9
Independent	Jason Keane	813	3.3	+3.3
Christians	Tim Pearce	630	2.5	+2.5
Animal Justice	Sarah Gould	448	1.8	+1.8
Total formal votes		24,879	95.5	−1.3
Informal votes		1,181	4.5	+1.3
Turnout		26,060	85.5	+4.4
Two-party-preferred result
Labor	Magenta Marshall	15,370	61.8	−25.9
Liberal	Hayley Edwards	9,495	38.2	+25.9
Labor hold		Swing	−25.9	

2023 Rockingham state by-election
Party	Candidate	Votes	%	±%
Labor	Magenta Marshall	10,791	49.33	−33.42
Liberal	Peter Hudson	3,868	17.73	+7.91
Independent	Hayley Edwards	3,488	15.95	+15.95
Legalise Cannabis	Rae Cottam	1,487	6.80	+6.80
Greens	Madeleine De Jong	1,081	4.94	+1.77
Christians	Mike Crichton	534	2.44	+2.44
Western Australia	Janetia Knapp	262	1.20	+1.20
Independent	Clive Gallety	193	0.88	+0.88
Independent	Peter Dunne	170	0.78	+0.78
Total formal votes		21,874	97.20	+0.46
Informal votes		630	2.80	−0.46
Turnout		22,504	74.48	−9.46
Notional two-party-preferred count
Labor	Magenta Marshall	13,978	65.20	−22.52
Liberal	Peter Hudson	7,461	34.80	+22.52
Two-candidate-preferred result
Labor	Magenta Marshall	13,412	61.37	−26.35
Independent	Hayley Edwards	8,443	38.63	+38.63
Labor hold		Swing	N/A	

2021 Western Australian state election: Rockingham
Party	Candidate	Votes	%	±%
Labor	Mark McGowan	19,661	82.8	+21.3
Liberal	Michael McClure	2,322	9.8	−7.9
Greens	Breanna Morgan	753	3.2	−4.0
One Nation	Geoff George	489	2.1	−6.6
No Mandatory Vaccination	Tom Hawkins	383	1.6	+1.6
Liberal Democrats	William Lofts	151	0.6	+0.6
Total formal votes		23,759	96.7	+1.1
Informal votes		801	3.3	−1.1
Turnout		24,560	83.9	−1.2
Two-party-preferred result
Labor	Mark McGowan	20,836	87.7	+14.2
Liberal	Michael McClure	2,916	12.3	−14.2
Labor hold		Swing	+14.2	

=== Elections in the 2010s ===
2017 Western Australian state election: Rockingham
Party	Candidate	Votes	%	±%
Labor	Mark McGowan	13,576	61.6	+5.2
Liberal	Wendy Baumann	3,965	18.0	−14.5
One Nation	James Omalley	1,915	8.7	+8.7
Greens	James Mumme	1,605	7.3	+1.2
Independent	Craig Buchanan	433	2.0	+2.0
Christians	Sylvia Stonehouse	413	1.9	−0.2
Micro Business	Mark Charles	147	0.7	+0.7
Total formal votes		22,054	95.7	+1.7
Informal votes		998	4.3	−1.7
Turnout		23,052	85.6	−1.5
Two-party-preferred result
Labor	Mark McGowan	16,174	73.4	+10.2
Liberal	Wendy Baumann	5,869	26.6	−10.2
Labor hold		Swing	+10.2	

2013 Western Australian state election: Rockingham
Party	Candidate	Votes	%	±%
Labor	Mark McGowan	11,716	56.4	+5.4
Liberal	Matthew Pollock	6,743	32.5	–0.4
Greens	Dawn Jecks	1,265	6.1	–6.8
Independent	Matthew Whitfield	610	2.9	+2.9
Christians	John Wieske	440	2.1	+2.1
Total formal votes		20,773	93.9	−0.4
Informal votes		1,341	6.1	+0.4
Turnout		22,114	88.0	
Two-party-preferred result
Labor	Mark McGowan	13,127	63.2	+1.8
Liberal	Matthew Pollock	7,642	36.8	–1.8
Labor hold		Swing	+1.8	

=== Elections in the 2000s ===
2008 Western Australian state election: Rockingham
Party	Candidate	Votes	%	±%
Labor	Mark McGowan	9,559	51.2	−4.1
Liberal	David Simpson	6,371	34.1	+1.3
Greens	James Mumme	2,432	13.0	+8.3
Citizens Electoral Council	Rob Totten	318	1.7	+1.3
Total formal votes		18,680	94.5	−0.1
Informal votes		1,097	5.5	+0.1
Turnout		19,777	86.4	
Two-party-preferred result
Labor	Mark McGowan	11,321	60.6	−0.7
Liberal	David Simpson	7,355	39.4	+0.7
Labor hold		Swing	−0.7	

2005 Western Australian state election: Rockingham
Party	Candidate	Votes	%	±%
Labor	Mark McGowan	12,573	56.3	+2.3
Liberal	Paul Ellis	7,108	31.8	+7.3
Greens	Daniel Boulton	1,040	4.7	−1.1
Christian Democrats	June Lewis	567	2.5	+2.5
One Nation	Garth Stockden	544	2.4	−9.7
Family First	Carena Harvey	416	1.9	+1.9
Citizens Electoral Council	Rob Totten	99	0.4	+0.4
Total formal votes		22,347	94.5	−0.7
Informal votes		1,311	5.5	+0.7
Turnout		23,658	90.7	
Two-party-preferred result
Labor	Mark McGowan	13,925	62.3	−3.7
Liberal	Paul Ellis	8,413	37.7	+3.7
Labor hold		Swing	−3.7	

2001 Western Australian state election: Rockingham
Party	Candidate	Votes	%	±%
Labor	Mark McGowan	11,136	53.7	+5.2
Liberal	Jodie Payne	5,180	25.0	−9.9
One Nation	Max Fiannaca	2,486	12.0	+12.0
Greens	Monique Keel	1,219	5.9	−0.1
Democrats	Dean Richter	579	2.8	−1.3
Seniors Party	Gordon Heyes	140	0.7	+0.7
Total formal votes		20,740	95.3	−0.4
Informal votes		1,025	4.7	+0.4
Turnout		21,765	91.6	
Two-party-preferred result
Labor	Mark McGowan	13,471	65.6	+8.1
Liberal	Jodie Payne	7,061	34.4	−8.1
Labor hold		Swing	+8.1	

=== Elections in the 1990s ===
1996 Western Australian state election: Rockingham
Party	Candidate	Votes	%	±%
Labor	Mark McGowan	9,759	48.5	+3.3
Liberal	Rob Brown	7,029	34.9	+8.8
Greens	Bob Goodale	1,211	6.0	+2.4
Democrats	Barbara Edwards	821	4.1	+2.2
	Mal McFetridge	681	3.4	+3.4
Independent	Arthur Galletly	420	2.1	+0.8
	Frans Schutte	195	1.0	+1.0
Total formal votes		20,116	95.7	+0.2
Informal votes		895	4.3	−0.2
Turnout		21,011	91.0	
Two-party-preferred result
Labor	Mark McGowan	11,531	57.5	+3.4
Liberal	Rob Brown	8,530	42.5	−3.4
Labor hold		Swing	+3.4	

1993 Western Australian state election: Rockingham
Party	Candidate	Votes	%	±%
Labor	Mike Barnett	9,391	46.4	−3.8
Liberal	Kathleen Harste	5,135	25.4	−11.6
Independent	Laurie Smith	3,822	18.9	+18.9
Greens	Barbara Gilchrist	717	3.5	+3.5
Independent	Allan Hill	508	2.5	+2.5
Democrats	John Anderson	397	2.0	+2.0
Independent	Arthur Galletly	260	1.3	+1.3
Total formal votes		20,230	95.3	+3.8
Informal votes		995	4.7	−3.8
Turnout		21,225	94.2	+1.7
Two-party-preferred result
Labor	Mike Barnett	11,217	55.5	+1.4
Liberal	Kathleen Harste	9,013	44.5	−1.4
Labor hold		Swing	+1.4	

=== Elections in the 1980s ===
1989 Western Australian state election: Rockingham
Party	Candidate	Votes	%	±%
Labor	Mike Barnett	8,333	50.2	−12.5
Liberal	Robert Douglas	6,137	37.0	+2.9
Grey Power	Elsie Pledge	2,135	12.8	+12.8
Total formal votes		16,615	91.5	
Informal votes		1,533	8.5	
Turnout		18,148	92.5	
Two-party-preferred result
Labor	Mike Barnett	8,986	54.1	−10.2
Liberal	Robert Douglas	7,629	45.9	+10.2
Labor hold		Swing	−10.2	

1986 Western Australian state election: Rockingham
Party	Candidate	Votes	%	±%
Labor	Mike Barnett	12,407	62.9	−6.8
Liberal	Robert Douglas	6,633	33.6	+3.3
Independent	Patricia Todd	676	3.4	+3.4
Total formal votes		19,716	97.4	−0.6
Informal votes		516	2.6	+0.6
Turnout		20,232	92.4	+1.5
Two-party-preferred result
Labor	Mike Barnett	12,737	64.6	−5.1
Liberal	Robert Douglas	6,979	35.4	+5.1
Labor hold		Swing	−5.1	

1983 Western Australian state election: Rockingham
Party	Candidate	Votes	%	±%
Labor	Mike Barnett	10,260	69.7	
Liberal	Maureen Mileham	4,466	30.3	
Total formal votes		14,726	98.0	
Informal votes		296	2.0	
Turnout		15,022	90.9	
Labor hold		Swing		

1980 Western Australian state election: Rockingham
Party	Candidate	Votes	%	±%
Labor	Mike Barnett	7,144	63.4	+9.4
Liberal	Edward Smeding	4,124	36.6	−9.4
Total formal votes		11,268	97.7	−0.6
Informal votes		262	2.3	+0.6
Turnout		11,530	90.5	−2.0
Labor hold		Swing	+9.4	

=== Elections in the 1970s ===
1977 Western Australian state election: Rockingham
Party	Candidate	Votes	%	±%
Labor	Mike Barnett	4,843	54.0	
Liberal	Ernest England	4,125	46.0	
Total formal votes		8,968	98.3	
Informal votes		158	1.7	
Turnout		9,126	92.5	
Labor hold		Swing		

1974 Western Australian state election: Rockingham
Party	Candidate	Votes	%	±%
Labor	Mike Barnett	3,573	46.8	
Liberal	Reginald Ritchie	3,146	41.2	
National Alliance	Ronald Harman	629	8.2	
Independent	Eric Edwards	289	3.8	
Total formal votes		7,637	95.7	
Informal votes		340	4.3	
Turnout		7,977	90.3	
Two-party-preferred result
Labor	Mike Barnett	3,887	50.9	
Liberal	Reginald Ritchie	3,750	49.1	
Labor hold		Swing		
