= 2023 Western Australian Labor Party leadership election =

- 6 June 2023
- Leadership election
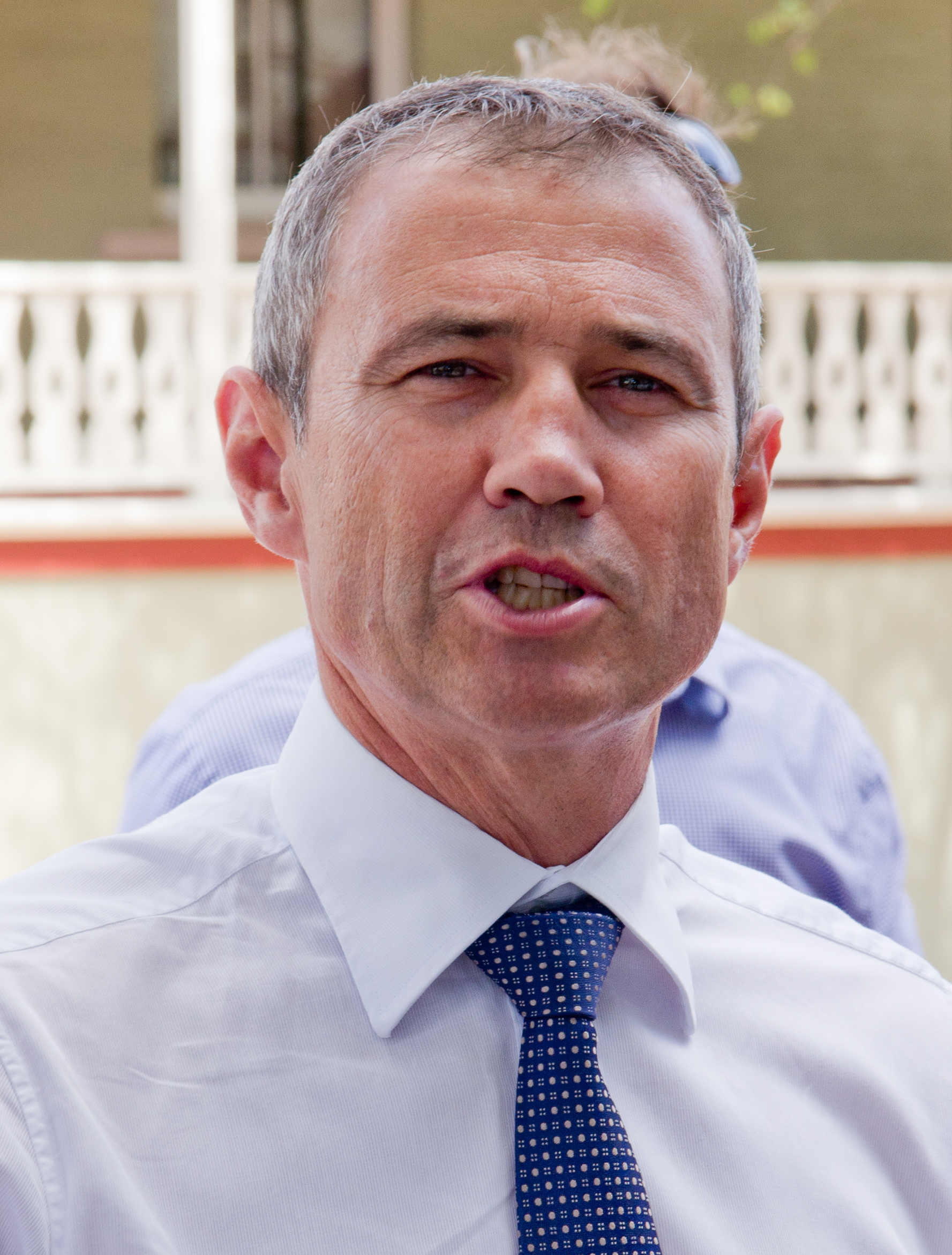
Nominee	Roger Cook
Caucus vote	Unopposed
Seat	Kwinana
Faction	Left
Leader before election
Mark McGowan
Elected Leader
Roger Cook
- Deputy leadership election
Nominee	Rita Saffioti
Caucus vote	Unopposed
Seat	West Swan
Faction	Unaligned
Deputy Leader before election
Roger Cook
Elected Deputy Leader
Rita Saffioti

A leadership election for the Western Australian Labor Party occurred on 6 June 2023 following the resignation of party leader and premier of Western Australia Mark McGowan in June 2023. The three contenders to replace McGowan were Roger Cook, Amber-Jade Sanderson and Rita Saffioti. Saffioti withdrew on 30 May in exchange for being Cook's deputy, and Sanderson withdrew on 30 May, leaving Cook as the sole nominee for leader.

== Background ==
Mark McGowan has been leader of the Western Australian Labor Party from January 2012 and premier of Western Australia from March 2017. During the COVID-19 pandemic, he achieved record levels of popularity and won the 2021 Western Australian state election in a landslide, winning 53 out of 59 possible seats in the Western Australian Legislative Assembly and a majority in the Western Australian Legislative Council for the first time in the Labor Party's history. The next election is due in 2025.

On 29 May 2023, McGowan announced his resignation as premier and member for Rockingham, saying that "the truth is I'm tired, extremely tired. In fact, I'm exhausted", and that he did not want to lead the party into the 2025 state election. He was amongst a minority of the WA Labor caucus to be factionally unaligned, and was said to be seen as being "above" the factional system.

== Candidates ==
ABC News, WAtoday, Business News and The West Australian reported that the most likely candidates to replace McGowan are Deputy Premier Roger Cook, Health Minister Amber-Jade Sanderson and Transport Minister Rita Saffioti. Cook and Sanderson are both part of the Labor Party's left faction, which is the dominant faction within WA Labor. Saffioti is unaligned factionally, but is closely allied with McGowan. The remaining faction is the right faction, also known as progressive Labor.

Cook confirmed his intention to run for the election on 29 May. Cook has been the member for Kwinana since September 2008, deputy leader of the WA Labor Party since September 2008, and a minister in the McGowan government since March 2017. He was in the prominent position of Health Minister from March 2017 to December 2021, including during the COVID-19 pandemic.

Saffioti said on 29 May that she was considering putting herself up as a candidate for leader but has not confirmed anything yet. She has been the member for West Swan since September 2008 and a minister in the McGowan government since March 2017, most notably as Transport Minister and Minister for Planning.

Sanderson has been the member for Morley since March 2017 and a minister in the McGowan government since March 2021. Before that, she had been a member for the East Metropolitan Region in the upper house from May 2013 to February 2017. In December 2021, she was promoted to the prominent position of Health Minister.

Unpublished polling conducted by Painted Dog Research for The West Australian in January 2023 found that Cook was favoured by 15 percent of voters to succeed McGowan if he were to retire. Saffioti was favoured by 13 percent, Sanderson was favoured by 6 percent, and 37 percent had "no idea".

== Voting procedures ==
=== Negotiations and nominations ===
Labor's left faction holds 45 out of the party's 75 seats. The faction consists of the United Workers Union (UWU) and the Australian Manufacturing Workers Union (AMWU).

An emergency meeting of the Labor caucus will be called. Nominations must be made within the three days after that meeting. Candidates must receive written support of at least 20 percent of the caucus. A ballot will then be held in which the caucus will have 50 percent of the vote and the rank-and-file party members will have 50 percent of the vote. This process could take up to four weeks, unless there is only one candidate, in which case there will not be a vote. These rules were instituted following the political instability of the Rudd and Gillard federal Labor governments. Cook expressed a desire for the party to unite behind one candidate so that the process could be completed by the end of the week.

26 Labor MPs affiliated with the UWU held a meeting on the morning of 30 May to determine who to support. They chose to support Sanderson over Cook, 17 votes to 11. The 17 AMWU members held a meeting on the afternoon of 30 May, unanimously choosing to back Cook to be leader and Saffioti to be deputy leader and treasurer. After that, Saffioti withdrew from leadership contention and put her support behind Cook, and Sanderson withdrew from contention, leaving Cook as the sole nominee.

The right faction met on 31 May and chose to support Cook.

=== Vote ===
Cook and Saffioti were confirmed as the new leader and deputy leader, respectively, on 6 June 2023.

== Aftermath ==
McGowan formally resigned on Thursday 8 June and Cook and his ministry were sworn in on that day. Cook was the first premier of Western Australia from Labor's left and the first Labor premier since Brian Burke to be factionally aligned.

Had Saffioti and Sanderson not stood aside, either could have balloted the entire WA Labor membership leaving the State with an interim premier for up to two months. In October 2023, a review recommended that Labor caucus have sole responsibility for selecting a new premier when Labor is in government, sidelining rank and file members. A full ballot would still be held when the party is in opposition. As well as McGowan's abrupt departure, the example of the election of Liz Truss the previous year in the UK's ruling Conservative party was a factor in the proposed rule changes.

== See also ==
- 2023 Rockingham state by-election
- 2023 Victorian Labor Party leadership election (September 2023)
- 2023 Queensland Labor Party leadership election (December 2023)
- 2023 Territory Labor Party leadership election (December 2023)
