= Bibliography of Sam Houston =

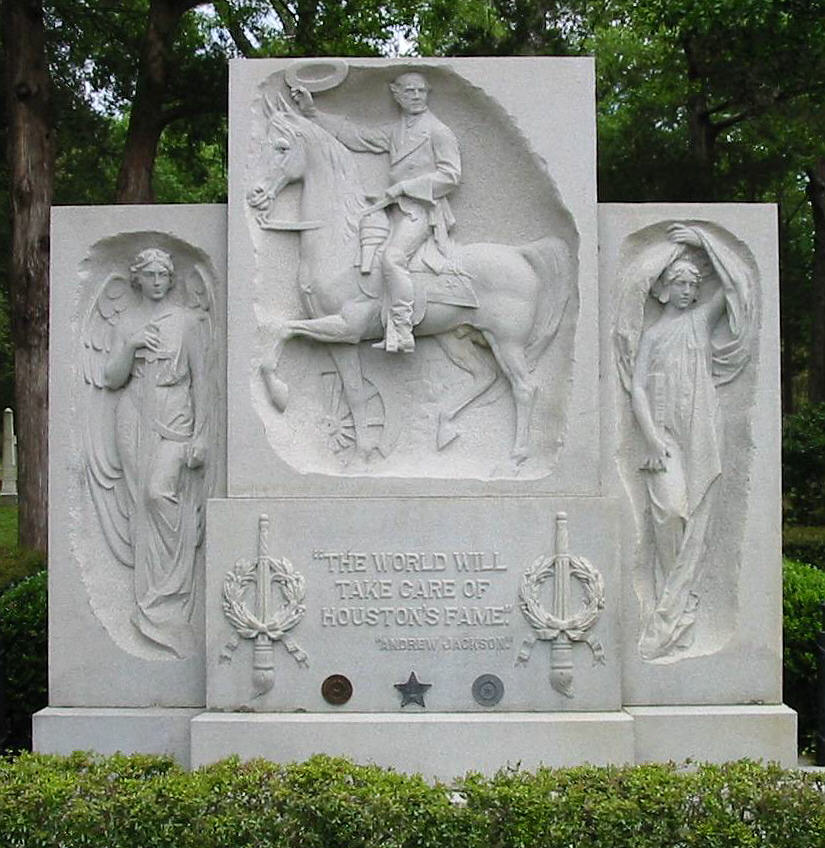
Sam Houston's grave in Huntsville, Texas

Samuel "Sam" Houston (March 2, 1793 – July 26, 1863) represented the state of Tennessee in the United States House of Representatives, and was elected Governor of Tennessee. He resigned the governorship in 1829 and lived with the Cherokee in the Arkansas Territory. The Cherokee named him "Golanv" meaning "The Raven". In 1832 he moved to Coahuila y Tejas and was a signer of the Texas Declaration of Independence on March 2, 1836. Houston was appointed commander-in-chief of the Provisional Army of Texas, and accepted the surrender of Mexican general Antonio López de Santa Anna following the Battle of San Jacinto.

Twice elected as President of the Republic of Texas, Houston eventually favored annexation to the United States. Afterwards he represented Texas in the United States Senate and was elected the 7th Governor of Texas. When the state seceded from the Union on March 5, 1861, Houston refused to sign a loyalty oath to the Confederate States of America and was removed from office on March 16.

== Bibliography ==
Sam Houston bibliography
Author	Title	Publisher	Notes	Pub Date	Refs
Unknown author	Life of General Sam Houston (Pamphlet)	J.T. Towers	Washington D.C.	1852	
David A. Adler, Michael S. Adler, Matt Collins	A Picture Book of Sam Houston	Holiday House	New York, NY	2012	
Judy Alter	Sam Houston: A Leader for Texas	Children's Press	New York, NY	1998	
Judy Alter	Sam Houston is My Hero	Texas Christian University Press	Fort Worth, TX	2003	
James P. Bevill	The Paper Republic : the Struggle for Money, Credit and Independence in the Republic of Texas	Bright Sky Press	Houston, TX	2009	
Valerie Bodden	Samuel Houston : Army leader & historic politician	ABDO Pub. Co.	Edina, MN	2010	
Tracey Boraas	Sam Houston:Soldier and Statesman	Bridgestone Books	Mankato, MN	2003	
Donald Braider	Solitary star; a biography of Sam Houston	Putnam	New York, NY	1974	
Henry Bruce	Life of General Houston, 1793–1863	Dodd, Mead and Company	New York, NY	1891	
George S. Bryan	Sam Houston	Macmillan Publishers	New York, NY	1917	
Randolph B. Campbell	Sam Houston and the American Southwest	HarperCollins	New York, NY	1993	
Peggy Caravantes	An American in Texas: The Story of Sam Houston	Morgan Reynolds Press	Greensboro, NC	2004	
Allan Carpenter	Sam Houston: Champion of America	Rourke Publications	Vero Beach, FL	1987	
William Carey Crane	Life and select literary remains of Sam Houston of Texas	J. B. Lippincott	Philadelphia, PA	1884	
Ann Fears Crawford and Betsy Warren	Sam Houston : American Hero	Hendrick-Long Publishing	Dallas, TX	1993	
George Creel	Sam Houston, Colossus in Buckskin	Cosmopolitan Book Corporation	New York, NY	1928	
Marshall DeBruhl	Sword of San Jacinto: a life of Sam Houston	Random House	New York, NY	1993	
Sarah Barnwell Elliott	Sam Houston	Small, Maynard & Company	Boston, MA	1900	
Sue Flanagan	Sam Houston’s Texas	University of Texas Press	Austin, TX	1964	
Llerena Friend	Sam Houston, the Great Designer	University of Texas Press	Austin, TX	1954	
Jean Fritz and Elise Primavera	Make Way for Sam Houston	Putnam	New York, NY	1986	
Jan Gleiter, Kathleen Thompson, Joel Naprstek	Sam Houston	Raintree Children's Books	Austin, TX	1988	
Matthew G. Grant and Harold Henriksen	Sam Houston of Texas	Children's Press	Chicago, IL	1974	
Jack Gregory and Rennard Strickland	Sam Houston with the Cherokees, 1829–1833	University of Oklahoma Press	Norman, OK	1996	
Susan R Gregson	Sam Houston:Texas Hero	Compass Point Books	Minneapolis, MN	2006	
James L. Haley	Sam Houston	University of Oklahoma Press	Norman, OK	2002	
Jeff Hamilton	"My master," the Inside Story of Sam Houston and His Times, by His Former Slave, Jeff Hamilton, as told to Lenoir Hunt	State House Press	Austin TX	1992	
Susan Sales Harkins; William H. Harkins	Sam Houston	Mitchell Lane	Hockessin, DE	2007	
Herbert L. Harper	Houston and Crockett: heroes of Tennessee and Texas: an anthology	Tennessee Historical Commission	Nashville, TN	1986	
Paul Hollander	Sam Houston	Putnam	New York, NY illustrated by Salem Tamer	1968sword of	
Clifford Hopewell	Sam Houston, Man of Destiny	Eakin Press	Austin, TX	1987	
Sam Houston	Speech of Hon. Sam Houston, of Texas, exposing the malfeasance and corruption of John Charles Watrous, judge of the federal court in Texas, and of his confederates : delivered in the Senate of the United States, Feb. 3, 1859	Pudney & Russell	New York, NY	1860	
Sam Houston	The Autobiography of Sam Houston	University of Oklahoma Press	Norman, OK edited by Donald Day & Harry Herbert Ullom	1954	
Sam Houston	Ever Thine Truly : Love Letters from Sam Houston to Anna Raguet	Jenkins Garrett Press	Austin, TX	1975	
Marquis James	The Raven: a biography of Sam Houston	Bobbs-Merrill Company	1930 Pulitzer Prize for biography	1929	
Marquis James; Bessie Rowland James	Six Feet Six, the Heroic Story of Sam Houston	Bobbs-Merrill Company	Indianapolis, IN	1986	
Albert Sidney Johnson	The Texas that might have been: Sam Houston's foes write to Albert Sidney Johnston	Texas A & M University Press	College Station, TX; Collected by Margaret Swett Henson, introduction by Donald E. Willett	2009	
William Weber Johnson and William Reusswig	Sam Houston, the Tallest Texan	Random House	New York. NY	1953	
John F. Kennedy	Sam Houston in the Senate	Pemberton Press	Austin, TX; From Chapter 5 of Profiles in Courage	1970	
Marjorie Kutchinski	Liberty, Justice & F’rall : the Dog Heroes of the Texas Republic	Eakin Press	Austin, TX; Fiction, as told by Sam Houston's dog Liberty	1998	
Jean Lee Latham	Retreat to Glory; the Story of Sam Houston	Harper and Row	New York, NY	1965	
Jean Lee Latham	Sam Houston, Hero of Texas	Garrard Pubublishing	Champaign, IL	1965	
Jean Lee Latham	Sam Houston	Chelsea House	New York, NY	1991	
Charles Edwards Lester	Sam Houston and his Republic	Burgess, Stringer & Co	New York, NY	1846	
Charles Edwards Lester	The Life of Sam Houston. The hunter, patriot, and statesman of Texas	Davis, Porter & Coates		1866	
Charles Edwards Lester	Life and achievements of Sam Houston: Hero and Statesman	J.B. Alden	New York, NY	1883	
William Lewis	Biographical Sketch of the Life of Sam Houston	Herald Steam Printing House	eBook	1882	
Jeff Long	Empire of Bones: a Novel of Sam Houston and the Texas Revolution	William Morrow	New York, NY	1993	
James S. Mayfield	Sam Houston, Fugitive from Justice			1927	
Walter Flavius McCaleb	Sam Houston	Naylor Company	San Antonio, TX	1967	
Agnes McEnery	Sam Houston, Soldier, Patriot, Statesman, the Great Man of Texas. Pithy Anecdotes of Sam Houston		San Antonio, TX	1936	
Dudley Dean McGaughy	The Sam Houston Story	Monarch Books	Derby, CT	1961	
Walter Scott McNutt	Sam Houston, the Empire Builder; His Love Affairs and Political Entanglements	Four States Pub. House	Jefferson, Texas	1956	
Darien A. McWhirter	The Legal 100: a Ranking of the Individuals Who Have Most Influenced the Law	Carol Publications	Secaucus, NJ	1998	
James Michener	The Eagle and the Raven	Tom Doherty Associates	Austin, TX	1990	
Miller|Barbara Kiely Miller	Sam Houston	Weekly Reader Publishing	Pleasantville, NY	2008	
Booth Mooney and George Roth	Sam Houston	Follett Publishing	Chicago, IL	1966	
Caroline Moore, Dorothy Leeper, and Bonnie Thorne.	Sam Houston: a Man Who Knew and Loved God	C. Moore		1997	
George J Morgenthaler	Promised Land : Solms, Castro, and Sam Houston’s colonization contracts	Texas A&M University Press	College Station, TX	2009	
Bill O'Neal	Sam Houston Slept Here : Homes of the Chief Executives of Texas	Eakin Press	Austin, TX	2004	
Joseph Olgin and André Le Blanc	Sam Houston, Friend of the Indians	Houghton Mifflin	Boston, MA	1958	
Patricia Smith Prather and Jane Clements Monday	From Slave to Statesman : the Legacy of Joshua Houston, Servant to Sam Houston	University of North Texas Press	Denton, TX	1993	
Madge Thornall Roberts	Star of Destiny : the Private Life of Sam and Margaret Houston	University of North Texas Press	Denton, TX	1993	
Madge Thornall Roberts	The Personal Correspondence of Sam Houston	University of North Texas Press	Denton, TX	1996	
Ben Lacy Rose and Margaret M. Marty	The Lea Ancestry of Margaret Lea, Wife of Gen. Sam Houston	B.L. Rose	Richmond, VA	1987	
William R. Sanford & Carl R. Green	Sam Houston:Texas Hero	Enslow Publishers	Springfield, NJ	1996	
William Seale	Sam Houston’s Wife: a Biography of Margaret Lea Houston	University of Oklahoma Press	Norman, OK	1970	
Flora Warren Seymour	Sam Houston, Patriot	The Century Co	New York, NY	1930	
Augusta Stevenson and Paul Laune	Sam Houston, Boy Chieftain	Bobbs-Merrill	Indianapolis, IN	1953	
Lisa Trutkoff Trumbauer	Sam Houston	Capstone Publishers	Mankato, MN	2004	
Carolyn Turner	Sam Houston	Weigl Publishers	New York, NY	2011	
Martha Anne Turner	Sam Houston and His Twelve Women; the Ladies Who Influenced the Life of Texas’ Greatest Statesman	Pemberton Press	Austin, TX	1966	
Mary Dodson Wade	Sam Houston: Standing Firm	Bright Sky Press	Houston, TX	2008	
Mary Dodson Wade	Sam Houston: I Am Sam Houston	Bright Sky Press	Houston, TX	2009	
Robert Penn Warren	How Texas Won Her Freedom; the Story of Sam Houston & the Battle of San Jacinto	San Jacinto Museum of History	San Jacinto, TX	1958	
Alfred Williams	Sam Houston and the War of Independence in Texas	Houghton Mifflin Harcourt	Boston, MA	1893	
Amelia W. Williams and Bernhardt Wall	Following General Sam Houston from 1793 to 1863	Steck	Austin, TX	1935	
Amelia W. Williams and Eugene C. Barker	The Writings of Sam Houston, 1813–1863	University of Texas Press	Austin, TX	1938–1943	
John Hoyt Williams	Sam Houston: a Biography of the Father of Texas	Simon & Schuster	New York, NY	1993	
Marion Wisehart	Sam Houston, American Giant	R.B. Luce	Washington D.C.	1962	
Walter M. Woodward	Sam Houston: for Texas and the Union	PowerPlus Books	New York, NY	2003	
Frances Fitzpatrick Wright	Sam Houston, Fighter and Leader	Abingdon-Cokesbury Press	Nashville, TN	1953	
Dan Zadra and Harold Henriksen	Sam Houston of Texas	Creative Education	Mankato, MN	1988	
