= Hayley Edwards =

Australian politician

Deputy Mayor of Rockingham
- In office 28 October 2021 – 21 October 2023

Councillor of the City of Rockingham for Baldivis Ward
- In office 19 October 2019 – 28 October 2021

Personal details
- Born: 1980 or 1981 (age 44–45)
- Party: Liberal
- Other political affiliations: Labor (until April 2023) Independent (until May 2024)
- Occupation: Business franchisee, Political candidate

Hayley Edwards was formerly the Deputy Mayor for the City of Rockingham and was an independent candidate during the 2023 Rockingham state by-election.

Edwards was the deputy mayor of the City of Rockingham. She was first elected as a councillor in 2019 and was elected deputy mayor by fellow councillors in 2021. She announced that she would not recontest her position during the 2023 Western Australia local government elections.

In 2023, Edwards, who had been a member of the WA Labor Party until April of that year, resigned from the party and announced her candidacy as an independent for the safe Labor seat of Rockingham. The WA Labor Party moved to preselect the political staffer Magenta Marshall to the seat, who was selected unopposed in the internal party process.

== Career ==
=== Pre-political career ===
In 2000, Edwards enlisted in the Australian Air Force as a military medic. In that role, she received a Commander's Commendation for her involvement in the aeromedical evacuation of the Bali bombing victims in 2002. She ended that role in 2003. She was a paramedic with Ambulance Victoria for four years, until 2010.

In 2011, Edwards became a franchisee of Anytime Fitness, and later served on various internal governance boards for the franchise. As of 2023, she is director of the trading company that owns the franchise businesses. (Note: FM Health Group Pty Ltd, owned by the FM Health Group Trust) The company owns the Anytime franchises in Midvale and Baldivis.

In 2019, Edwards was involved in the formation of the Rockingham Alliance Against Depression which had its launch at the Hotel Clipper in Rockingham in October 2019. The AAD was based on the European AAD which reduced suicidal behaviors by 24% over a 2 year period.

=== Politics ===
In 2019, Edwards was elected as a councillor for the Baldivis Ward in the City of Rockingham, for a four-year term. She was elected deputy mayor by her fellow councillors in 2021. In 2023, she announced she would not re-contest her position after her term expired.

In April 2023, Edwards resigned her membership from the WA Labor Party. Then in May 2023, Western Australian Premier Mark McGowan resigned, triggering a by-election in his safe Labor seat of Rockingham. Due to Edwards' decision to resign her membership from the Labor Party, Edwards was not eligible to nominate for preselection due to Party requirements for nominees to hold a minimum of 12 months continuous party membership. The party then preselected political staffer Magenta Marshall who was selected unopposed as its candidate for the seat. Following this, Edwards announced that she would stand in the by-election as an independent candidate. Edwards went on to receive 15.95% of the primary and 38.63% of the two-candidates preferred vote and as such was unsuccessful for her campaign to be elected to the seat of Rockingham.

In May 2024, it was revealed by The West Australian that Hayley Edwards is nominating for preselection for the Western Australian Liberal Party to reattempt at contesting the state seat of Rockingham at the 2025 Western Australian State Election. Edwards' first political battle as a WA Liberal Party Member is facing construction worker Patchara Weggers in a Liberal plebiscite before being able to have a rematch with Labor's Magenta Marshall.

In June 2024, The West Australian revealed that Edwards won support from local Liberal members to take on Magenta Marshall in the safe seat of Rockingham. A rematch remate with Marshall will now occur at the 2025 Western Australian state election.
