= Electoral results for the district of West Swan =

Western Australian district election results

This is a list of electoral results for the electoral district of West Swan in Western Australian state elections.

== Members for West Swan ==
Member	Party	Term
Rita Saffioti	Labor	2008–present

== Election results ==
=== Elections in the 2020s ===
2025 Western Australian state election: West Swan
Party	Candidate	Votes	%	±%
Labor	Rita Saffioti	16,001	57.3	−21.2
Liberal	Lucky Saini	5,004	17.9	+6.5
Greens	Ben Hermann	2,941	10.5	+6.7
One Nation	Cristina Pomana	1,649	5.9	+5.9
Legalise Cannabis	Elliott Taylor	1,253	4.5	+4.5
Christians	Dara Connors	1,076	3.9	+0.8
Total formal votes		27,924	95.0	−0.5
Informal votes		1,468	5.0	+0.5
Turnout		29,392	85.3	+5.8
Two-party-preferred result
Labor	Rita Saffioti	19,763	70.8	−13.9
Liberal	Lucky Saini	8,135	29.2	+13.9
Labor hold		Swing	−13.9	

Results are not final. Last updated on 25 March 2025 at 7:00 PM AWST

2021 Western Australian state election: West Swan
Party	Candidate	Votes	%	±%
Labor	Rita Saffioti	20,635	77.9	+19.2
Liberal	Dave Nesbit	3,122	11.8	−13.7
Greens	Manjot Singh	1,038	3.9	−2.3
Christians	Brian Warburton	823	3.1	+1.3
No Mandatory Vaccination	Genevieve Cocliff	438	1.7	+1.7
WAxit	Lucky Saini	421	1.6	+0.7
Total formal votes		26,477	95.7	+1.0
Informal votes		1,204	4.3	−1.0
Turnout		27,681	85.8	−3.8
Two-party-preferred result
Labor	Rita Saffioti	22,278	84.2	+15.7
Liberal	Dave Nesbit	4,194	15.8	−15.7
Labor hold		Swing	+15.7	

=== Elections in the 2010s ===
2017 Western Australian state election: West Swan
Party	Candidate	Votes	%	±%
Labor	Rita Saffioti	13,456	57.1	+12.9
Liberal	Rod Henderson	6,141	26.1	−21.2
Greens	Beth McMullan	1,721	7.3	+1.5
Shooters, Fishers, Farmers	Trevor Ruwoldt	985	4.2	+4.2
Christians	Isaac Moran	696	3.0	+0.4
Matheson for WA	James Lawrence	569	2.4	+2.4
Total formal votes		23,568	94.1	+1.2
Informal votes		1,473	5.9	−1.2
Turnout		25,041	88.4	+7.9
Two-party-preferred result
Labor	Rita Saffioti	15,812	67.1	+18.1
Liberal	Rod Henderson	7,744	32.9	−18.1
Labor hold		Swing	+18.1	

2013 Western Australian state election: West Swan
Party	Candidate	Votes	%	±%
Labor	Rita Saffioti	10,617	48.0	+2.5
Liberal	Natasha Cheung	9,900	44.7	+6.6
Greens	Peter Leam	1,059	4.8	–4.5
Christians	Esther Wieske	557	2.5	–1.5
Total formal votes		22,133	93.2	−0.9
Informal votes		1,622	6.8	+0.9
Turnout		23,755	90.5	
Two-party-preferred result
Labor	Rita Saffioti	11,487	51.9	–2.2
Liberal	Natasha Cheung	10,644	48.1	+2.2
Labor hold		Swing	–2.2	

=== Elections in the 2000s ===
2008 Western Australian state election: West Swan
Party	Candidate	Votes	%	±%
Labor	Rita Saffioti	8,612	46.2	−7.1
Liberal	Rod Henderson	7,017	37.6	+5.9
Greens	Michael Boswell	1,676	9.0	+3.9
Christian Democrats	Barbara Butler	872	4.7	+0.9
Independent	Chris Fayle	483	2.6	+2.6
Total formal votes		18,660	93.7	−0.7
Informal votes		1,246	6.3	+0.7
Turnout		19,906	89.0	
Two-party-preferred result
Labor	Rita Saffioti	10,156	54.4	−6.2
Liberal	Rod Henderson	8,497	45.6	+6.2
Labor hold		Swing	−6.2	
