= Pinjarra Senior High School =

Location
- Pinjarra, Western Australia; Australia
- Coordinates: 32.6330°S 115.8723°E

Information
- Type: Independent Public School
- Motto: Be True
- Established: 1921; 105 years ago
- Founder: John Fairbairn
- Educational authority: WA Department of Education
- Principal: Jan Stone
- Teaching staff: 56.4 FTE (2019)
- Enrolment: 734 (2019)
- Campus type: Regional
- Colours: Navy blue and light blue
- Website: pinjarrashs.wa.edu.au

Pinjarra Senior High School is an independent high school in Pinjarra, a regional centre 86 kilometres (53 mi) south of Perth, Western Australia. The school district covers the Pinjarra and surrounding areas such as Serpentine, Dwellingup, Waroona, North Yunderup and South Yunderup.

Established in 1921, the school enrolled 729 students in 2018, from Year 7 to Year 12, of whom eight percent identified as Indigenous Australians and nine percent of whom had a language background other than English.

The WA Department of Education has educational oversight of the school. The school principal is Jan Stone.

== History ==
John Fairbairn founded Pinjarra's first school in 1848, before obtaining its present site in 1921 when a three-room school building and manual training centre was completed.

The school operated as a primary school until 1951, then as a junior high school until 1960, a high school until 1965 and as a senior high school since 1965.

Elizabeth Aitken served as principal until 2011 and was replaced with Alan Hunt who held the role between 2011 and 2015. Rob Lawson served as principal from 2015 until 2018; when he was succeeded by Jan Stone.

== Campus ==
The school has made a couple of notable additions to the campus within the past decade. In 2011, an AU$1.9 million science laboratory was built under the Building Education Revolution scheme with Western Australia's Chief Scientist Lyn Beazley visiting the facility in 2009 during construction.

In 2013, a Technology and Enterprise Building and Trade Training Centre was completed, at a cost of around AU$7m, which caters to the development of skills and experience in foods, textiles, woodwork, metalwork and automotive trades.

In July 2020, a AU$10.4 million Performing Arts Centre and Sports Hall was announced by Western Australian Premier Mark McGowan during a visit to the school. Work on the project commenced in November 2021. As of January 31, the building has been completed. It is called the 'Performing Arts Centre' and it has an indoor basketball court, change rooms, lockers, a kitchen, music and drama rooms, and toilets.

== Specialist programs ==
Pinjarra Senior High School has three specialist programs which students can opt for, including:

=== Pinjarra Football Academy (PFA) ===
The Pinjarra Football Academy (PFA) has been in operation since 2008 and is delivered to students over a course of 3 years. From Year 8 through to Year 10, students remain together as a group during Mathematics, English, Humanities and Social Sciences, English and Specialist Football delivered through the Health and Physical Education department. The program is supported by significant community partnerships with Pinjarra Football Club, Peel Thunder and Fremantle Football Club.

In 2019, the PFA was extended to include girls in Years 8 and 9.

=== Academic Extension ===
The program is for students in Years 8 to 10 who are keen to be challenged, committed to achievement, and who aspire to study at high levels in their senior years of schooling and beyond. Students who are identified as potential candidates for this program will have demonstrated their ability through state and national testing and other school achievements, as well as their approach to learning.

=== Music ===
The Pinjarra Music Program offers students from Years 7 to 12 a range of opportunities. Students in Lower School (Year 7 to 9) continue their lessons with their instrumental teachers and round-out their musical training within the Classroom Music Program (studying how to analyse and understand music, read and write both traditional notation and tablature, and use musical software to generate, record and produce music). Students in Year 10 further these skills in preparation for their study of a Certificate II/III in Music in Years 11 and 12.

GT Online

As of 2024, the school has support for GT Online, an academic state-wide extension program. It offers students from years 7 - 10 extracurricular advanced math, science, English, and HASS lessons. If you are part of GT Online, you skip your regular periods in Maths, English, HASS, and Science, for using that time in GT Online.

== Notable alumni ==
- Mike Barnett AM – politician; Member for Rockingham; former Speaker of the WA Legislative Assembly
- John Butler – musician, founder and namesake of John Butler Trio
- Robert Edward Fiennes-Clinton FZS – hereditary peer to his grandfather's title as the Earl of Lincoln
- Kamdyn McIntosh – Australian rules footballer for Richmond Football Club (since 2012)

== See also ==
- List of schools in rural Western Australia
- Education in Western Australia
