= Trumbauer =

Trumbauer is a surname. Notable people with the surname include:

- Frankie Trumbauer (1901–1956), American jazz saxophonist
- Horace Trumbauer (1868–1938), American architect
- Lisa Trutkoff Trumbauer (1963–2008), American author
