= 2023 Rockingham state by-election =

Election in Western Australia

- 29 July 2023

Electoral district of Rockingham in the Western Australian Legislative Assembly

	First party	Second party	Third party
			IND
Candidate	Magenta Marshall	Peter Hudson	Hayley Edwards
Party	Labor	Liberal	Independent
Popular vote	10,791	3,868	3,488
Percentage	49.33%	17.73%	15.95%
Swing	▼33.42	▲7.91	▲15.95
TCP	61.37		38.63%
TCP swing	▼26.35		▲38.63
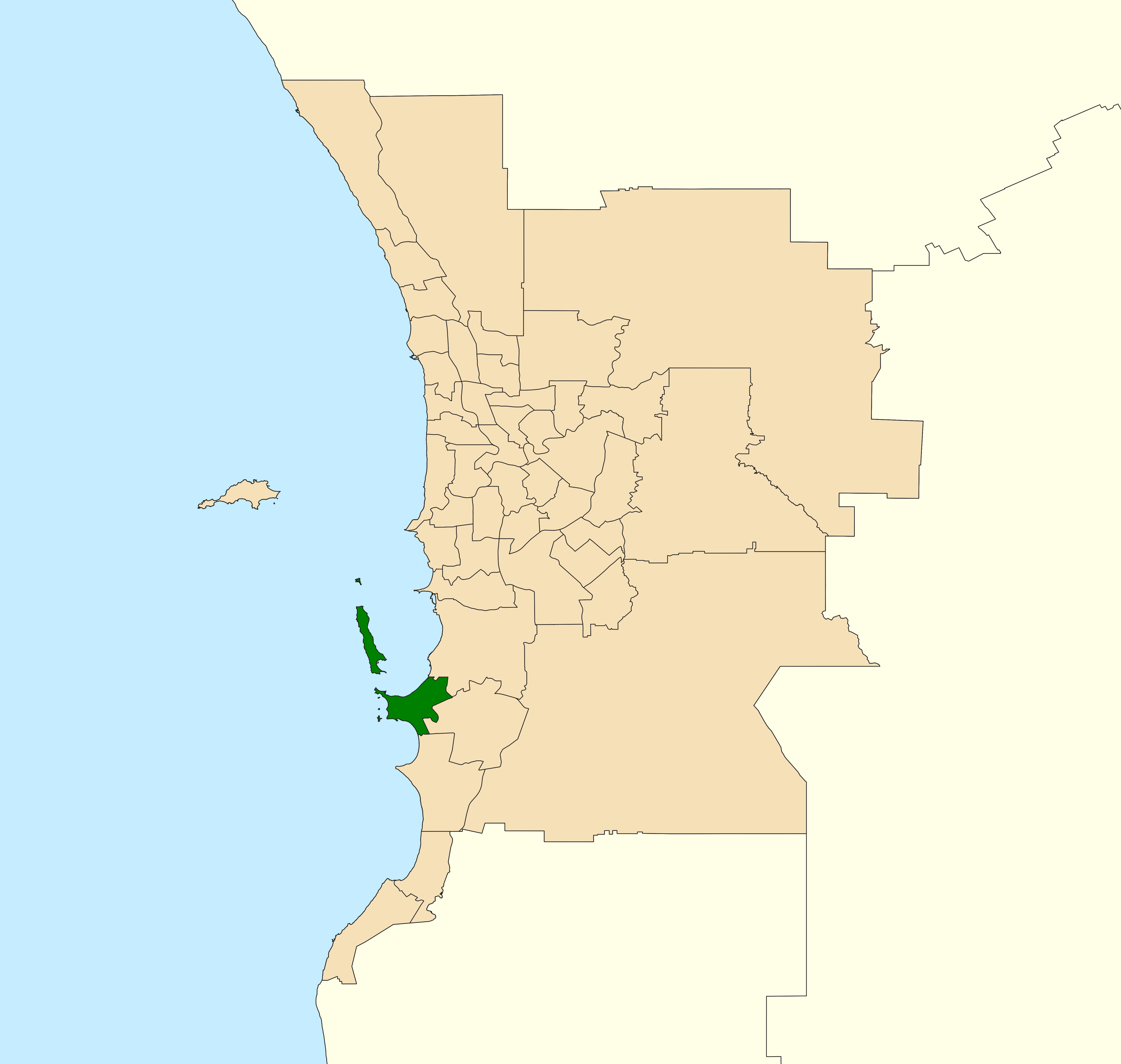
- Map showing the location of the electoral district of Rockingham (dark green) in metropolitan Perth, Western Australia
MP before election
Mark McGowan
Labor
Elected MP
Magenta Marshall
Labor

A by-election for the electoral district of Rockingham in Western Australia was held on 29 July 2023, following the resignation of Premier and sitting Labor MP Mark McGowan, on 8 June 2023. The writ was issued on the same day.

The two major party candidates for the election were Magenta Marshall for the Australian Labor Party and Peter Hudson for the Liberal Party. Additionally, Hayley Edwards the Deputy Mayor of the City of Rockingham also announced her candidacy. The Greens preselected Madeleine De Jong. There were nine candidates for the seat. Notably, both major parties preselected candidates under the age of 30.

The election was called for Labor at 7:30pm AWST, with Marshall claiming victory for the Labor Party. However, Labor suffered one of the biggest swings against it at a by-election in the state's history: with a swing against them of 33.4% in the primary vote and a swing against of 22.5% in the two-party-preferred vote.

== Background ==
=== Resignation of Mark McGowan ===
On 29 May 2023, McGowan announced that he was resigning as Premier of Western Australia and the MLA for Rockingham, a seat he had held since 1996. He stated that the job was "relentless" and that he no longer had the "energy or drive to continue". Reflecting on his political career, McGowan thanked voters of Western Australia who had "provided [him] with the opportunity of a lifetime." McGowan led Labor to government for the first time since 2008 in 2017.

=== Seat details ===
The electoral district of Rockingham was first contested at the 1974 Western Australian state election and has been held by the Australian Labor Party since its inception. Previous member Mike Barnett held the district from the beginning until his retirement at the 1996 election where he was succeeded by McGowan. Barring the elections in 1974 and 1977, Rockingham has been a consistently safe electorate for Labor with the smallest margin being 0.9 per cent of the two-party-preferred vote (TPP) in its first election. At the 2021 Western Australian state election, McGowan received a TPP of 87.7% - one of the highest margins in both federal and state elections in Australia.

Geographically, the district encompasses the City of Rockingham and its surrounding areas. Located 47 km south-southwest of the Perth CBD by the coast near the Cockburn Sound inlet. The district is adjacent to several maritime and resource-industry installations and offshore is home to Australia's largest naval fleet and submarine base at Garden Island. According to the 2021 Census, the median age of Rockingham is 45 with a weekly median household income of $1,273 per week. 20.5 per cent of residents are currently engaged in secondary education and 17.7 per cent in tertiary education.

Two-party-preferred vote in Rockingham, 1996–2021
Election	1996	2001	2005	2008	2013	2017	2021
Labor	57.50%	65.6%	62.30%	60.60%	63.20%	73.40%	87.70%
Liberal	42.50%	34.4%	37.70%	39.40%	36.80%	26.60%	12.30%
Government	LIB	ALP	ALP	LIB	LIB	ALP	ALP

== Candidates ==
Party	Candidate	Background
Labor	Magenta Marshall	Labor campaign strategist.
Legalise Cannabis	Rae Cottam	City of Rockingham councillor.
Liberal	Peter Hudson	Resources sector recruitment consultant; candidate for Brand at the 2022 federal election.
	Janetia Knapp	Candidate for Fremantle at the 2022 federal election. Endorsed by the unregistered Western Australia Party.
Greens	Madeleine De Jong	Former staffer to Jordon Steele-John.
Independent	Clive Galletly	Massage therapist.
Independent	Hayley Edwards	Deputy Mayor of Rockingham. She was formerly affiliated with the Labor Party.
Australian Christians	Mike Crichton	Candidate for the Senate at the 2022 federal election.
Independent	Peter Dunne	Candidate at the 2022 North West Central state by-election.

=== Preselection ===
==== Labor ====
On 14 June, it was confirmed that Labor strategist Magenta Marshall has been preselected for Labor to run as the party's candidate in Rockingham.

==== Liberal ====
On 13 June, the Liberal Party announced that the party would contest the by-election.

On 18 June, it was reported that 21-year-old Peter Hudson will be the party's candidate. He was the only person to nominate for preselection.

== 2021 election results ==
2021 Western Australian state election: Rockingham
Party	Candidate	Votes	%	±%
Labor	Mark McGowan	19,661	82.8	+21.3
Liberal	Michael McClure	2,322	9.8	−7.9
Greens	Breanna Morgan	753	3.2	−4.0
One Nation	Geoff George	489	2.1	−6.6
No Mandatory Vaccination	Tom Hawkins	383	1.6	+1.6
Liberal Democrats	William Lofts	151	0.6	+0.6
Total formal votes		23,759	96.7	+1.1
Informal votes		801	3.3	−1.1
Turnout		24,560	83.9	−1.2
Two-party-preferred result
Labor	Mark McGowan	20,836	87.7	+14.2
Liberal	Michael McClure	2,916	12.3	−14.2
Labor hold		Swing	+14.2	

== Results ==
2023 Rockingham state by-election
Party	Candidate	Votes	%	±%
Labor	Magenta Marshall	10,791	49.33	−33.42
Liberal	Peter Hudson	3,868	17.73	+7.91
Independent	Hayley Edwards	3,488	15.95	+15.95
Legalise Cannabis	Rae Cottam	1,487	6.80	+6.80
Greens	Madeleine De Jong	1,081	4.94	+1.77
Christians	Mike Crichton	534	2.44	+2.44
Western Australia	Janetia Knapp	262	1.20	+1.20
Independent	Clive Gallety	193	0.88	+0.88
Independent	Peter Dunne	170	0.78	+0.78
Total formal votes		21,874	97.20	+0.46
Informal votes		630	2.80	−0.46
Turnout		22,504	74.48	−9.46
Notional two-party-preferred count
Labor	Magenta Marshall	13,978	65.20	−22.52
Liberal	Peter Hudson	7,461	34.80	+22.52
Two-candidate-preferred result
Labor	Magenta Marshall	13,412	61.37	−26.35
Independent	Hayley Edwards	8,443	38.63	+38.63
Labor hold		Swing	N/A	

== See also ==
- List of Western Australian state by-elections
