= Rita Saffioti =

Australian politician

The Honourable Rita Saffioti MLA
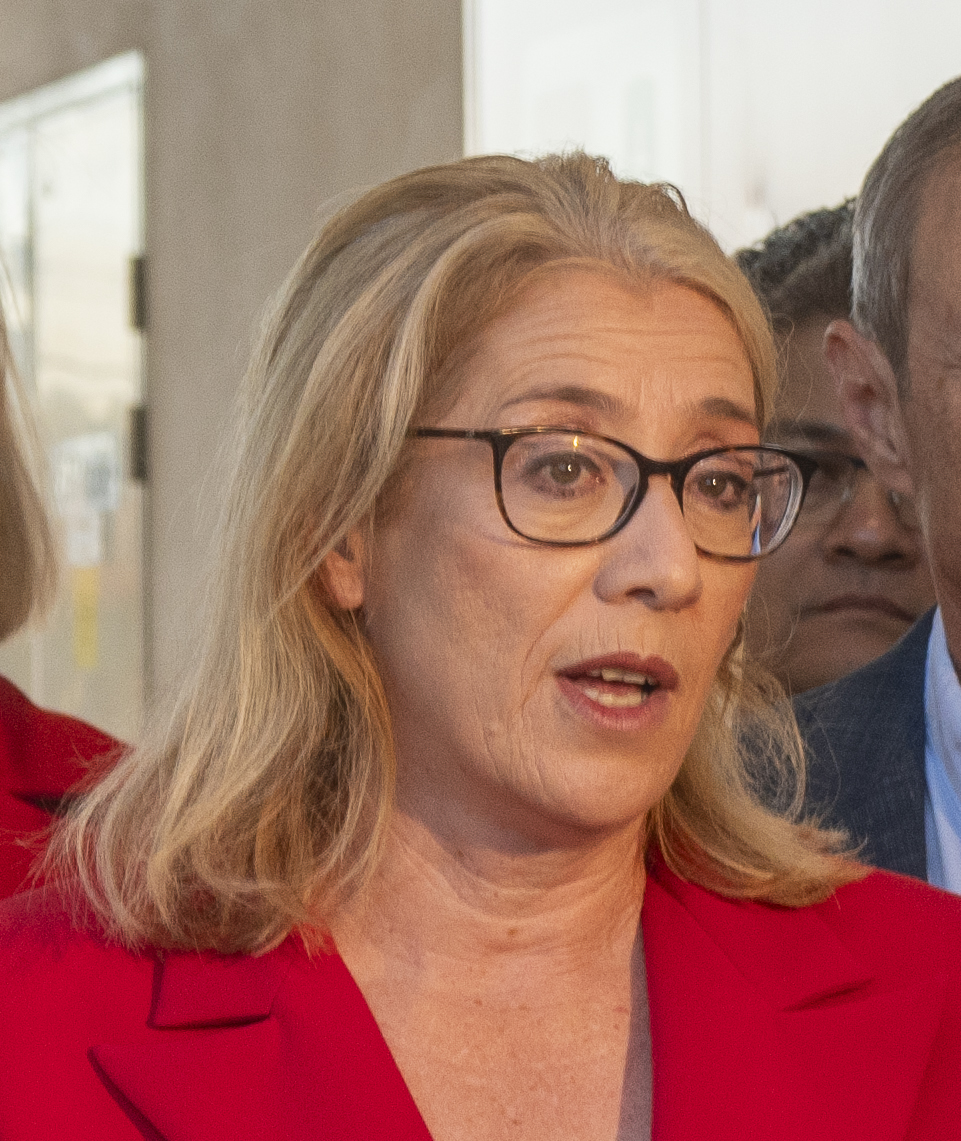
- Saffioti in 2025

Deputy Premier of Western Australia
- Incumbent
- Assumed office 8 June 2023
- Premier: Roger Cook
- Preceded by: Roger Cook

Treasurer of Western Australia
- Incumbent
- Assumed office 8 June 2023
- Premier: Roger Cook
- Preceded by: Mark McGowan

Minister for Transport and Major Infrastructure
- Incumbent
- Assumed office 13 July 2026
- Premier: Roger Cook
- Preceded by: Herself (as Minister for Transport)

Minister for Transport
- In office 17 March 2017 – 13 July 2026
- Premier: Mark McGowan; Roger Cook
- Preceded by: Bill Marmion
- Succeeded by: Herself (as Minister for Transport and Major Infrastructure)

Minister for Sport and Recreation
- Incumbent
- Assumed office 19 March 2025
- Premier: Roger Cook
- Preceded by: David Templeman

Deputy Leader of the Western Australian Labor Party
- Incumbent
- Assumed office 6 June 2023
- Leader: Roger Cook
- Preceded by: Roger Cook

Minister for Tourism
- In office 8 June 2023 – 19 March 2025
- Premier: Roger Cook
- Preceded by: Roger Cook
- Succeeded by: Reece Whitby

Minister for Planning
- In office 17 March 2017 – 8 June 2023
- Premier: Mark McGowan
- Preceded by: Donna Faragher
- Succeeded by: John Carey

Minister for Ports
- In office 19 March 2021 – 8 June 2023
- Premier: Mark McGowan
- Preceded by: Alannah MacTiernan
- Succeeded by: David Michael

Minister for Lands
- In office 17 March 2017 – 13 December 2018
- Premier: Mark McGowan
- Preceded by: Terry Redman
- Succeeded by: Ben Wyatt

Member of the Western Australian Legislative Assembly for West Swan
- Incumbent
- Assumed office 6 September 2008
- Preceded by: New seat

Personal details
- Born: 26 May 1972 (age 54) Perth, Western Australia, Australia
- Party: Labor Party
- Children: 3
- Education: Curtin University

Rita Saffioti (born 26 May 1972) is an Australian politician. Representing the Australian Labor Party, she has been the member for the electoral district of West Swan in the Western Australian Legislative Assembly, the lower house of the Parliament of Western Australia, since 6 September 2008. She is currently serving as the Deputy Premier of Western Australia, the Treasurer of Western Australia, the Minister for Transport, and the Minister for Sport and Recreation under premier Roger Cook.

== Early life and career ==
Saffioti was born on 26 May 1972 in Perth, Western Australia, to Nicodemo Saffioti, an orchardist, and Giuseppina Ienco, a cook's assistant. Saffioti's parents were post-war immigrants from the Italian region of Calabria. She grew up on an orchard in Roleystone in the Perth Hills with an older sister, and attended Roleystone Primary School, Roleystone District High School, and Kelmscott Senior High School, at which she became dux.

She graduated with a Bachelor of Business degree with distinction from Curtin University, majoring in economics. She then worked in Canberra and Perth for the Department of Finance and then in Perth for the Department of Treasury. She joined the Australian Labor Party in 1996, and from 1997, she worked as an economics adviser for Geoff Gallop, the leader of the opposition until 2001 and Premier of Western Australia following 2001. From February 2003 to February 2005, Saffioti was the director of the economics policy unit of the Department of the Premier and Cabinet. From February 2005 to January 2006, she was a strategic management advisor for the Office of the Premier. In January 2006, Alan Carpenter replaced Gallop as the premier. From January 2006 to April 2008, Saffioti was the chief of staff for the Office of the Premier. Following her preselection for the electoral district of West Swan, she worked as a strategic consultant for the Fremantle Football Club from April to July 2008.

== Parliament ==
Saffioti unsuccessfully stood for election at the 2005 Western Australian state election. She was sixth place on the Labor Party's ticket for the East Metropolitan Region in the Western Australian Legislative Council (upper house). She won preselection for West Swan in April 2008, with Carpenter controversially hand-picking her over Swan Hills MP Jaye Radisich and the Labor Right's Belinda Coniglio. At the 2008 Western Australian state election on 6 September, Saffioti was elected to the newly created electoral district of West Swan in the Western Australian Legislative Assembly, the lower house of the Parliament of Western Australia. She was re-elected at the elections in 2013, 2017 and 2021. Over its existence, West Swan has covered the north-eastern Perth suburbs of Ballajura, Caversham, Ellenbrook, Landsdale and parts of the Swan Valley.

From 9 April 2013 to 26 June 2015, Saffioti was the shadow minister for planning, finance, government accountability and women's interests. From 26 June 2015 to 11 March 2017, she was the shadow minister for planning, finance, transport and infrastructure.

On 17 March 2017, following the election of the McGowan government on 11 March 2017, Saffioti was appointed as the minister for transport, minister for planning, and minister for lands. She stopped being minister for lands on 13 December 2018, with Premier Mark McGowan saying it would enable Saffioti to focus more on Metronet, the government's expansion program for Perth's rail network. Ben Wyatt succeeded her as minister for lands. Following the 2021 election, on 19 March 2021, Saffioti became the minister for ports, as well as keeping her existing ministries.

Agencies under the responsibility of the minister for transport are the Department of Transport & Major Infrastructure, Main Roads Western Australia and the Public Transport Authority. Agencies under the responsibility of the minister for planning are the Department of Planning, Lands & Heritage and the Western Australian Planning Commission. Agencies under the responsibility of the minister for ports are Fremantle Ports, the Kimberley Ports Authority, the Mid West Ports Authority, the Pilbara Ports Authority and the Southern Ports Authority.

Upon becoming minister for transport, Saffioti cancelled the controversial Roe 8 highway project, which would have extended Roe Highway through the Beeliar Wetlands. The cancellation fulfiulled an election promise made by Labor. The contract for the project was renegotiated to instead construct three different road projects: duplication of Wanneroo Road between Joondalup Drive and Flynn Drive, connection between Murdoch Drive and Roe Highway, and duplication of Armadale Road between Tapper Road and Anstey Road. $46.9 million of taxpayer funds was written off by the decision to cancel Roe 8.

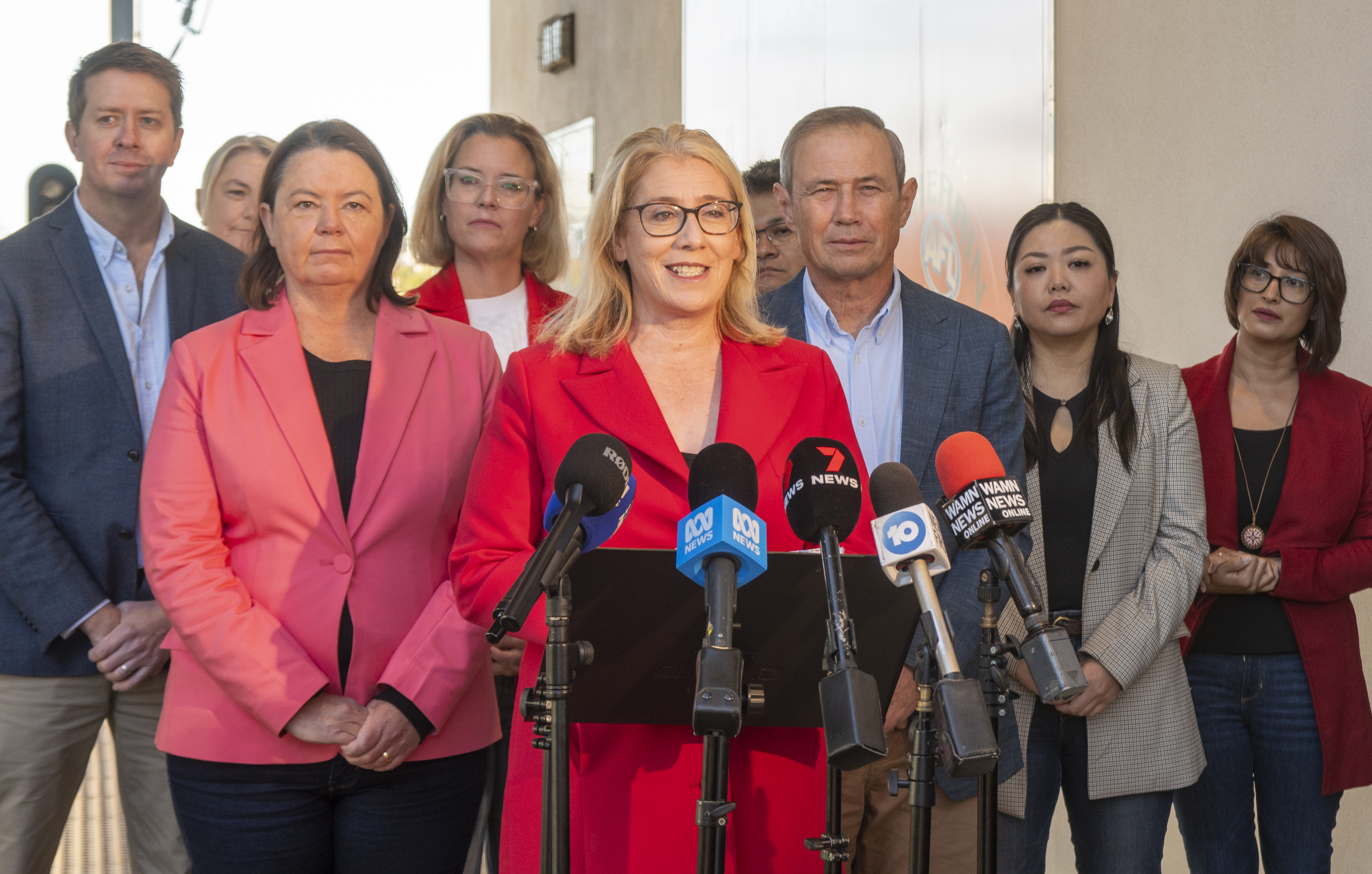
Saffioti speaking at the opening of the Thornlie–Cockburn Link and Victoria Park-Canning Level Crossing Removal Project

As the minister for transport and minister for planning, Saffioti has control over Metronet. Under Metronet, construction started on the Morley–Ellenbrook line (now known as the Ellenbrook line), an extension of the Joondalup line (now known as the Yanchep line) to Yanchep, an extension of the Armadale line to Byford, an extension of the Thornlie line to Cockburn Central on the Mandurah line, a new station at Lakelands on the Mandurah line, a rebuild of Bayswater station, Claremont station and Midland station, and the removal of several level crossings along the Armadale/Thornlie lines and Midland line. Railcar manufacturing was also brought back into Western Australia for the first time since the 1990s, with the Transperth C-series trains being manufactured in Bellevue, Western Australia. Redevelopment areas were established around Bayswater station and High Wycombe station in 2019. During the 2017 election campaign, Saffioti promised that all Metronet stage 1 projects would be finished within eight years.

Following Mark McGowan's announcement on 29 May 2023 of his imminent resignation as premier and Labor leader, Saffioti entered the ensuing leadership ballot as one of three candidates. As the left faction has a strong position within the Labor Party's caucus, the position was likely to go to a left-aligned candidate such as Roger Cook or Amber-Jade Sanderson rather than the unaligned Saffioti. Polling conducted in January 2023 by Painted Dog Research for The West Australian showed that Saffioti was favoured by 13 percent of voters to succeed McGowan if he were to retire, behind Cook at 15 percent but above Sanderson at 6 percent. On 30 May, the Australian Manufacturing Workers Union chose Cook as its preferred candidate for leader and Saffioti as its preferred candidate for deputy leader. Following that, Saffioti withdrew from leadership contention and backed Cook to be leader and herself as deputy. The Labor Party formally elected her as deputy leader on 6 June 2023.

The Cook ministry was sworn in on 8 June 2023. Saffioti was installed as the deputy premier of Western Australia, treasurer, and minister for tourism, while staying on as transport minister and relinquishing the roles of minister for planning and minister for ports. Some people, including deputy Liberal Party leader Steve Thomas expressed concern about the high workload placed on Saffioti, although ministers have previously had similar portfolios, most recently when Troy Buswell was treasurer, minister for transport, minister for housing, and minister for emergency services in the Barnett ministry.

In the 2025 Western Australian state election, she was re-elected.

== Political views ==
Saffioti is one of four Labor MPs in state parliament that is not factionally aligned as of 2025. In 2010, she spoke out against parliament rules which prohibited her from taking her baby into the chamber. Government MPs Rob Johnson, Joe Francis and Vince Catania threatened to kick her out of the chamber under rules that meant strangers were not allowed in the chamber. Saffioti has also voiced support for a family room in Parliament House.

== Personal life ==
Saffioti married Timothy Fraser on 21 October 2006 at the Perth Town Hall. They have two daughters and one son born via IVF. She was the first member of parliament to give birth in over 10 years, with the previous time being Michelle Roberts in 1999. Saffioti is Catholic. She supports the Fremantle Football Club.

== See also ==
- Electoral results for the district of West Swan

Western Australian Legislative Assembly
New title	Member for West Swan; 6 September 2008 – present	Incumbent
Political offices
Preceded by Roger Cook	Deputy Premier of Western Australia; 8 June 2023 – present	Incumbent
Preceded by Mark McGowan	Treasurer of Western Australia; 8 June 2023 – present	Incumbent
Preceded by Bill Marmion	Minister for Transport; 17 March 2017 – present	Incumbent
Preceded by Roger Cook	Minister for Tourism; 8 June 2023 – present	Incumbent
Preceded by Donna Faragher	Minister for Planning; 17 March 2017 – 8 June 2023	Succeeded by John Carey
Preceded by Terry Redman	Minister for Lands; 17 March 2017 – 13 December 2018	Succeeded by Ben Wyatt
Preceded by Alannah MacTiernan	Minister for Ports; 19 March 2021 – 8 June 2023	Succeeded by David Michael
Party political offices
Preceded by Roger Cook	Deputy leader of the Western Australian Labor Party; 6 June 2023 – present	Incumbent
