= Mike Barnett (politician) =

Australian politician (1946–2023)

The Honourable Mike Barnett AM

24th Speaker of the Western Australian Legislative Assembly
- In office 10 June 1986 – 17 June 1993
- Preceded by: John Harman
- Succeeded by: Jim Clarko

Member of the Western Australian Legislative Assembly
- In office 30 March 1974 – 14 December 1996
- Preceded by: None (new creation)
- Succeeded by: Mark McGowan
- Constituency: Rockingham

Personal details
- Born: 24 January 1946 Belper, Derbyshire, England
- Died: 29 December 2023 (aged 77)
- Party: Labor (from 1970)
- Education: Pinjarra High School

Michael Barnett AM (24 January 1946 – 29 December 2023) was an Australian politician who was a Labor Party member of the Western Australian Legislative Assembly from 1974 to 1996, representing the seat of Rockingham. He served as Speaker of the Legislative Assembly from 1986 to 1993.

== Life and career ==
Barnett was born in Belper, Derbyshire, England, and briefly attended Trescobeas County Secondary School (in Falmouth, Cornwall). His family migrated to Western Australia in December 1958, and settled in Pinjarra, where he attended Pinjarra High School. Prior to entering politics, Barnett was the owner of a caravan park in Rockingham, one of Perth's southern suburbs. He joined the Labor Party in 1970, and at the 1974 state election successfully contested the newly created seat of Rockingham, narrowly defeating the Liberal candidate.

After the 1977 state election, Barnett was appointed to the shadow ministry of Colin Jamieson. He remained in the shadow ministry when Ron Davies replaced Jamieson as leader in 1978, and when Brian Burke replaced Jamieson in 1981. However, when Labor won government at the 1983 election, Barnett was not elevated to cabinet, but instead made chairman of committees in the Legislative Assembly. After the 1986 election, he was elevated to the speakership, replacing the retiring John Harman. The youngest speaker since Bertie Johnston in 1917, he served until the Labor government's defeat at the 1993 election, and retired from parliament at the 1996 election. From 2004 to 2008, Barnett served as chairman of the Fire and Emergency Services Authority (FESA), a state government agency. In 2006, he was made a Member of the Order of Australia (AM), "for service to the Parliament of Western Australia and to the community of Rockingham".

The Mike Barnett Sports Complex in Rockingham was named after Barnett.

After a long period suffering from dementia, Barnett died on 29 December 2023. He was 77.

Parliament of Western Australia
New creation	Member for Rockingham; 1974–1996	Succeeded by Mark McGowan
Preceded by John Harman	Speaker of the Legislative Assembly; 1986–1993	Succeeded by Jim Clarko
