= Business News (Australia) =

- Managing Editor: Sean Cowan
- CEO: Charles Kobelke
- Categories: Business
- Frequency: Fortnightly
- Circulation: 45,000
- Publisher: Business News Pty Ltd
- Founder: Harry Kleyn
- Founded: 1992
- Country: Australia
- Based in: 41 St Georges Terrace, Perth, Western Australia
- Language: English
- Website: www.businessnews.com.au

Business News (formerly WA Business News) is an independently owned business media organisation which provides a digital news service and fortnightly business magazine. Established in 1992 and based in Perth, Western Australia, its twice daily business alerts reach 45,000 email addresses and the magazine has a total fortnightly circulation of 11,100 and readership of 28,280. It was founded by Harry Kleyn and his business partners Vanguard Press as a fortnightly free circulation newspaper.

In 2000, after finding new investors, the paper developed a digital edition and changed to weekly circulation. It moved to a subscription business model in 2002.

The newspaper publishes the Book of Lists, an annual publication listing the biggest companies in each sector in Western Australia, two free Daily Business Alert emails delivered at 7.00am and 4.00pm, an industry alert Mining email as well as organising a number of events such as the 40under40 Awards, an awards program for young business achievers and the WA Business Awards, a program for Western Australia's most successful private companies. Business News also hosts the Success & Leadership breakfast series throughout the year, featuring highly regarded Western Australian business leaders, speaking about their own professional and personal journey of success, the "Politics & Business" series breakfasts, featuring politicians from both sides of the political spectrum and "Sector Briefing" lunches highlighting the challenges and opportunities within different industries.

In 2013, the company re-branded to Business News and expanded its paywall around the digital assets.

It announced in March 2021 the size of its editorial budget had increased by 78 per cent over the previous three years, while subscription revenue was up by 53 per cent and advertising revenue up by 145 per cent in the same period. Events revenue almost tripled.

== Awards ==
In 2003, the newspaper won a Bronze Award at the US-based Alliance of Area Business Publications Editorial Excellence Awards. In 2005, Business News won the Bronze Award for Small Business Tabloid and Best Scoop. In 2007, it won the Gold Award for Best Special Section Design and in 2008, the Silver Award for Best Front Page. In 2015, the paper won the Bronze Award for Best Daily E-Mail.

In 2022 Business News won a Gold Award for best coverage of local breaking news as well as for best investigative reporting. They also won a "Best in Show" award for most improved publication for its fortnightly magazine, a silver award in the "Best in Show" category of best website and finally, the podcast "At Close of Business" won the silver award for best podcast.

In 2023 Business News won a Silver in the "best personality profile" and "investigative reporting" categories as well as a Gold Award for the website, Silver Award for the At Close of Business Podcast and a Bronze Award in the daily email category for the Afternoon Wrap email.

In 2024 Business News won gold in the best body of work by a single journalist and silver in the best bylined commentary category for large publications as well as first place in the best coverage of local breaking news and gold in the best beat reporting in economics and finance. The ESG series received silver in the best ancillary publication category. The Afternoon Wrap won a gold award in the best daily email category this year and the website took out the top award.
