= Augusta Stevenson =

American writer

- Born: Indianapolis, Indiana
- Occupation: Writer, teacher
- Period: 20th century
- Genre: Children's literature

Augusta Stevenson (1869–1976) was a writer of children's literature and a teacher. She was born in Indianapolis, Indiana, and wrote more than thirty children's books, her most famous being for the "Childhood of Famous Americans" series and five volumes of "Children's Classics in Dramatic Form."

== Life ==
As well as writing, she taught in Indianapolis Public Schools.

== Childhood of Famous Americans ==
Childhood of Famous Americans was a series of biographies of famous Americans. The series began in 1932 with Abraham Lincoln, concentrating on his boyhood with a mix of fact and fictional episodes, aimed at children aged 8–12. Published by Indianapolis company Bobbs-Merrill, it was reprinted every year for the next four years. Other authors were brought in, including Helen Monsell; the books continued to sell well, and were translated and widely used in schools. Stevenson wrote titles including Booker T. Washington, Ambitious Boy; Ben Franklin, Printer's Boy; George Carver: Boy Scientist, and Clara Barton: Girl Nurse.

== Children's Classics in Dramatic Form ==
The first volume of Children's Classics in Dramatic Form was published in 1908, intended as a textbook for school children, and later republished as Plays for the Home. It included stories from Aesop, Hans Christian Andersen, the Brothers Grimm, and the 1001 Arabian Nights. Harrap's Dramatic Readers, Book III, published 1911, mainly drew on folklore such as "The Ugly Duckling", "The Crow and the Fox", and "The Emperor's Test".
