= Magenta Marshall =

Australian politician (born 1994)

Magenta Rose Marshall

Member for Rockingham in the Western Australian Legislative Assembly
- Incumbent
- Assumed office 29 July 2023
- Preceded by: Mark McGowan

Personal details
- Born: 14 December 1994 (age 31) East Fremantle, Western Australia, Australia
- Party: Labor (2014–present)
- Spouse: Jake Thomas Marshall (m. 2022)
- Children: 1
- Parents: Barry Robert Wilders (father); Janine Marie Wilders (mother)
- Education: Murdoch University; Tranby College
- Occupation: Politician

Magenta Rose Marshall (born 14 December 1994) is an Australian politician who has served as the member for Rockingham in the Western Australian Legislative Assembly since 2023. A member of the Labor Party, she was elected at a by-election to succeed former Premier Mark McGowan, who had retired from politics.

== Early life and education ==
Magenta Marshall was born on 14 December 1994 in East Fremantle, Western Australia to Janine Marie Wilders a public servant. Marshall grew up in single-parent household in Cooloongup living with her mum and later legally adopted by Barry Robert Wilders. She then purchased her first home with her husband in Waikiki in 2020.

Marshall attended school at Tranby College and studied at Murdoch University. During her university studies, Magenta spent a semester abroad studying at Gadjah Mada University in Yogyakarta, Indonesia and volunteered her spare time to teach English at a local school. Marshall went on to successfully complete her Bachelor of Arts majoring in Asian Studies and Political and International Relations with a minor in Indonesian.

== Personal life ==
Magenta Marshall grew up in Cooloongup, Western Australia and is married to Jake Marshall, a public school teacher. She currently lives in Waikiki.

Marshall took a period of leave from Parliament in July 2024 as she became a mother, later returning to official duties only 6 weeks later in September. This follows criticism from her previous Liberal opponent and current City of Rockingham Councillor, Peter Hudson, where he posed that Marshall should resign from parliament if she would to fall pregnant.

== Politics ==
Marshall joined the Western Australian Labor Party in 2014 and became a member of the Transport Workers' Union of Australia in 2016 making her a member of the Labor Right faction.

From 2016 to 2017, Marshall worked as a Membership engagement officer at the Transport Workers Union. She then worked for four years as an Electorate officer to David Michael MLA between 2017 and 2021. After that, she worked as a Campaign director at WA Labor from 2021 to 2023.

Following the resignation of Mark McGowan, Marshall was preselected unopposed as Labor's candidate for the 2023 Rockingham state by-election. McGowan publicly endorsed Magenta as his successor and joined her campaign. Magenta received 49.33% of the primary vote, and 61.37% of the two candidate preferred vote, electing her as the member for Rockingham in the Western Australian Legislative Assembly.

Marshall is currently serving on the Forty-First Parliament for Rockingham where she presides as the Acting Speaker of the Western Australian Legislative Assembly and the Joint Standing Committee on Delegated Legislation.

== See also ==
- 2023 Rockingham state by-election

Western Australian Legislative Assembly
Preceded by Mark McGowan	Member for Rockingham; 2023–present	Incumbent
