= Electoral district of West Swan =

State electoral district in Perth, Western Australia

West Swan Western Australia—Legislative Assembly
- Interactive map of electoral district boundaries from the 2025 state election
- State: Western Australia
- Dates current: 2008–present
- MP: Rita Saffioti
- Party: Labor Party
- Namesake: West Swan
- Electors: 34,451 (2025)
- Area: 120 km^{2} (46.3 sq mi)
- Demographic: Metropolitan
- Coordinates: 31.82°S 115.93°E
Electorates around West Swan:
Landsdale	Swan Hills	Swan Hills
Girrawheen	West Swan	Swan Hills
Morley	Bassendean	Midland

West Swan is an electoral district of the Legislative Assembly in the Australian state of Western Australia. It is located in the north-eastern suburbs of Perth.

West Swan was considered a safe Labor seat at its creation, but after a redistribution prior to the 2017 state election became notionally Liberal. After its creation prior to the 2008 election, ABC electoral commentator Antony Green calculated a theoretical margin of 10.6% favouring Labor Party over the Liberal Party in two party preferred terms. Rita Saffioti won the seat in 2008, holding it again with a margin of 1.9 points after the 2013 election. A redistribution in 2015 saw the seat with a notional 0.9 point Liberal margin, however Saffioti retained the seat at the 2017 election which saw a large swing to Labor.

== Geography ==
The roughly oblong-shaped district is dominated by the bushland of Whiteman Park and Cullacabardee. The voters of West Swan are situated towards the eastern, southern and western edges of the district. To the north-west is the suburb of Landsdale. To the south lies Ballajura, Malaga and part of Beechboro. The suburbs of Henley Brook and West Swan lie to the west; whilst Caversham is situated in the south-west corner of the district.

== History ==
West Swan was first contested at the 2008 state election. It was a new seat created as a result of the one-vote-one-value reforms. A majority of the new district's voters came from the abolished district of Ballajura; with the remainder drawn in from Bassendean, Wanneroo and Swan Hills.

== Members for West Swan ==
Member	Party	Term
Rita Saffioti	Labor	2008–present

== Election results ==
2025 Western Australian state election: West Swan
Party	Candidate	Votes	%	±%
Labor	Rita Saffioti	16,011	57.3	−21.2
Liberal	Lucky Saini	4,990	17.9	+6.5
Greens	Ben Hermann	2,947	10.6	+6.7
One Nation	Cristina Pomana	1,651	5.9	+5.9
Legalise Cannabis	Elliott Taylor	1,257	4.5	+4.5
Christians	Dara Connors	1,077	3.9	+0.8
Total formal votes		27,933	94.9	−0.6
Informal votes		1,495	5.1	+0.6
Turnout		29,428	85.4	+5.9
Two-party-preferred result
Labor	Rita Saffioti	19,864	71.2	−13.6
Liberal	Lucky Saini	8,054	28.8	+13.6
Labor hold		Swing	−13.6	
