= Electoral district of Rockingham =

State electoral district in Perth, Western Australia

Rockingham Western Australia—Legislative Assembly
- Interactive map of electoral district boundaries from the 2025 state election
- State: Western Australia
- Dates current: 1974–present
- MP: Magenta Marshall
- Party: Labor
- Namesake: Rockingham
- Electors: 30,484 (2025)
- Area: 49 km^{2} (18.9 sq mi)
- Demographic: Metropolitan
- Coordinates: 32.29°S 115.74°E
Electorates around Rockingham:
Indian Ocean	Indian Ocean	Kwinana
Indian Ocean	Rockingham	Kwinana
Indian Ocean	Baldivis	Baldivis

Rockingham is an electoral district of the Legislative Assembly in the Australian state of Western Australia.

The district is located in the outer south-western suburbs of Perth.

Rockingham has been held at all times by the Labor Party, and is currently held by Magenta Marshall.

== Geography ==
The electorate is a compact, urban district centred on the coastal community of Rockingham, a satellite suburb to the south-west of Perth. The district also takes in the neighbouring suburbs of Peron, Shoalwater, Safety Bay, as well as parts of Cooloongup, East Rockingham and Waikiki. The district also includes Garden Island.

The seat was created in 1974 at the height of the Charles Court government's popularity, and was initially a marginal Labor seat. However, a redistribution ahead of the 1980 election made it much friendlier to Labor, and since then it has been one of Labor's safest seats. Since 1980, Labor's hold on the seat has only been seriously threatened twice, in 1989 and 1993.

== Members for Rockingham ==
Rockingham has had only three members. The first, Mike Barnett, served as Speaker of the Legislative Assembly for most of the Burke and Dowding governments. He retired in 1996 and handed the seat to Mark McGowan, a minister in the Gallop and Carpenter governments, and later a prominent member of the opposition to the Barnett government.

McGowan was elected leader of WA Labor, and hence Leader of the Opposition, in 2012. As a measure of Labor's strength in the seat, McGowan picked up a modest swing in his favour in 2013 even as Labor was heavily defeated statewide.

Four years later, McGowan led Labor to the largest majority government in the state's history. Along the way, his own margin in Rockingham swelled from an already comfortably safe 13.2 percent to 23.4 percent. In 2021, he led Labor to the most comprehensive election victory at any level in Australia since Federation, with 53 out of 59 seats. His own margin in Rockingham ballooned to 37.7 percent, the safest seat in the state. On 29 May 2023 McGowan announced his resignation, citing "exhaustion" from the position. Magenta Marshall retained the seat for Labor at the ensuing by-election.

Member	Party	Term
Mike Barnett	Labor	1974–1996
Mark McGowan	Labor	1996–2023
Magenta Marshall	Labor	2023–present

== Election results ==
2025 Western Australian state election: Rockingham
Party	Candidate	Votes	%	±%
Labor	Magenta Marshall	11,581	46.5	−36.2
Liberal	Hayley Edwards	6,660	26.8	+17.0
Greens	Robert Delves	1,981	8.0	+4.8
One Nation	Cristina Oregioni	1,551	6.2	+4.2
Legalise Cannabis	Phillip Leslie	1,215	4.9	+4.9
Independent	Jason Keane	813	3.3	+3.3
Christians	Tim Pearce	630	2.5	+2.5
Animal Justice	Sarah Gould	448	1.8	+1.8
Total formal votes		24,879	95.5	−1.3
Informal votes		1,181	4.5	+1.3
Turnout		26,060	85.5	+4.4
Two-party-preferred result
Labor	Magenta Marshall	15,370	61.8	−25.9
Liberal	Hayley Edwards	9,495	38.2	+25.9
Labor hold		Swing	−25.9	
