= Allan Carpenter =

American author

John Allan Carpenter
- Born: May 11, 1917 Waterloo, Iowa, U.S.
- Died: May 11, 2003 (aged 86) Chicago, Illinois
- Occupation: Author
- Genre: non-fiction
- Literary movement: Founded "The Teachers Digest"
- Notable awards: Life Achievement Award from the University of Northern Iowa, 1988

John Allan Carpenter (born May 11, 1917 – May 11, 2003) was an American non-fiction author. He was a prolific writer with more than 225 books to his credit. By 1990, his four Enchantment series were approaching 10 million copies printed.

Among his accomplishments is the founding of the national magazine The Teachers Digest. At the age of 21, he was the director of public relations for Popular Mechanics, a position he held for 19 years. Among his many writings are the sixteen-volume Popular Mechanics Home Handyman Encyclopedia, the 52-volume Enchantment of America state series and his 38-volume Enchantment of Africa series. His book: Illinois: Land of Lincoln, was the official book of the Illinois Sesquicentennial Celebration in 1968. In 1993, he co-authored World Almanac of the U.S.A..

“For more than twenty-five years, intermittently, he served as clerk of Session of the Second Presbyterian Church in Evanston, Illinois.” He has been a member of many non-professional symphony orchestras including the Chicago Business Men's Orchestra. He was a founder and president of the Music Council of Metropolitan Chicago. In 1988, Carpenter received a Life Achievement Award from the University of Northern Iowa. He was president of the Society of Wilson Descendants for more than forty years. Carpenter was a Life Member of the Illinois St. Andrew society.
