= Lisa Trumbauer =

American children's book author, born 1963

Lisa Trutkoff Trumbauer (February 15, 1963 - August 28, 2008) was a prolific American author of children's books.

== Early life and education ==
Trumbauer was born in The Bronx, New York City, on February 15, 1963, to Fred and Sigrid Trutkoff. She earned a bachelor's degree from the University of Maryland.

Trumbauer became a children's author, often of "explainer" books about science (What is Electricity? (2004), What is Gravity (2004), Forces and Motion (1989)), although she also wrote some young adult light fiction (The Runaway Valentines (1993)). In 2006, Nina Hess, editor of the Mirrorstone imprint at Wizards of the Coast that produced children's picture books, asked Trumbauer to write Mirrorstone's first title, A Practical Guide to Dragons. The book became a New York Times Bestseller in the category "Children's Books."

The website Library Things lists 330 titles to Trumbauer's credit. Trumbauer was a member of the Society of Children's Book Writers and Illustrators.

== Selected publications ==
=== Non-fiction ===
- All About Light (2004)
- All About Sound (2004)
- What Is Electricity? (2004)
- Philadelphia: Home of Liberty (2002)
- The Sahara Desert (2002)
- At the Eiffel Tower (2002)
- National Parks (2002)
- Visit the Capitol
- What Is Gravity? (2004)
- Titanic - Lost and Found (date unknown)

=== Fantasy fiction ===
- Dungeons & Dragons novel Hidden Dragon (June 2005)
- A Practical Guide to Vampires, Mirrorstone Books, 2009, ISBN 9780786952434
- Mystery of Canyon Creek
- A Practical Guide to Dragons
- Has Anyone Seen My Green Dinosaur
- I Swear I Saw a Witch in Washington
- A Practical Guide to Dragon Riding, Mirrorstone Books

== Personal life ==
Trumbauer was married, and lived in Hillsborough, New Jersey. She died in her home on August 28, 2008.
