= Mark McGowan =

30th Premier of Western Australia

The Honourable Mark McGowan AC
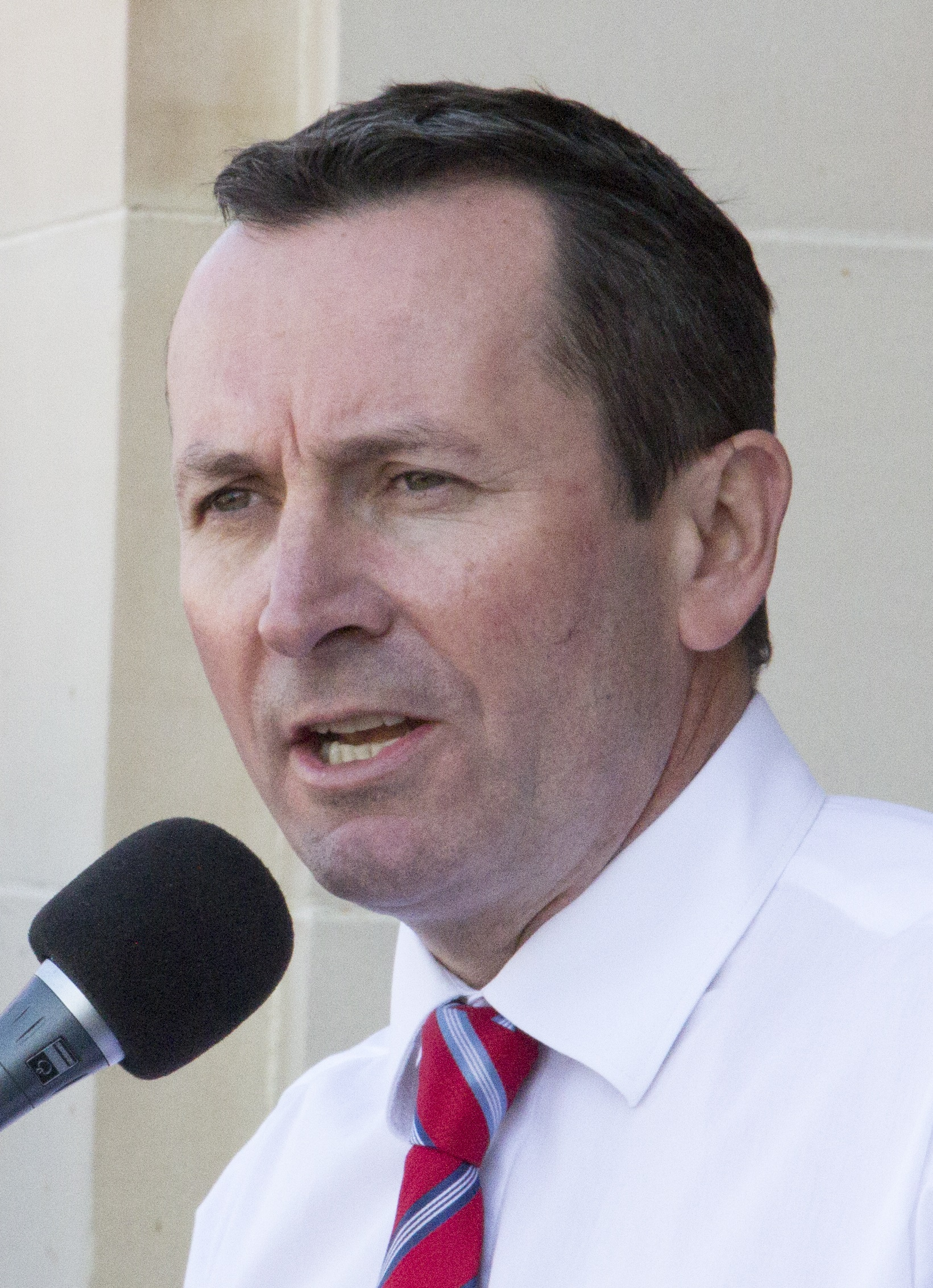
- McGowan in April 2014

30th Premier of Western Australia
- In office 17 March 2017 – 8 June 2023
- Monarchs: Elizabeth II; Charles III
- Governor: Kerry Sanderson; Kim Beazley; Chris Dawson
- Deputy: Roger Cook
- Preceded by: Colin Barnett
- Succeeded by: Roger Cook

Treasurer of Western Australia
- In office 18 March 2021 – 8 June 2023
- Preceded by: Ben Wyatt
- Succeeded by: Rita Saffioti

Leader of the Western Australian Labor Party
- In office 23 January 2012 – 6 June 2023
- Deputy: Roger Cook
- Preceded by: Eric Ripper
- Succeeded by: Roger Cook

Leader of the Opposition in Western Australia Elections: 2013
- In office 23 January 2012 – 17 March 2017
- Premier: Colin Barnett
- Deputy: Roger Cook
- Preceded by: Eric Ripper
- Succeeded by: Mike Nahan

Member of the Legislative Assembly for Rockingham
- In office 14 December 1996 – 8 June 2023
- Preceded by: Mike Barnett
- Succeeded by: Magenta Marshall
Other ministerial offices
Minister for Public Sector Management
In office 17 March 2017 – 19 March 2021
Preceded by	Bill Marmion
Succeeded by	Roger Cook
Minister for Education and Training
In office 13 December 2006 – 23 September 2008
Premier	Alan Carpenter
Preceded by	Ljiljanna Ravlich
Succeeded by	Liz Constable
Minister for the Environment
In office 3 February 2006 – 13 December 2006
Premier	Alan Carpenter
Preceded by	Judy Edwards
Succeeded by	Tony McRae
Minister for Disability Services
In office 13 October 2005 – 2 March 2007
Premier	Geoff Gallop; Alan Carpenter
Preceded by	Bob Kucera
Succeeded by	Margaret Quirk
Minister for Tourism, Racing and Gaming
In office 10 March 2005 – 13 December 2006
Premier	Geoff Gallop; Alan Carpenter
Preceded by	Nick Griffiths
Succeeded by	Sheila McHale; John Bowler
Minister for the Peel and South West
In office 10 March 2005 – 23 September 2008
Premier	Geoff Gallop; Alan Carpenter
Preceded by	Norm Marlborough
Succeeded by	David Templeman

Personal details
- Born: 13 July 1967 (age 59) Newcastle, New South Wales, Australia
- Party: Labor
- Spouse: Sarah Miller (m. 1996)
- Children: 3
- Education: Casino High School; Coffs Harbour High School
- Alma mater: University of Queensland
- Profession: Lawyer; politician
- Website: www.markmcgowan.com.au

Military service
- Allegiance: Australia
- Branch/service: Royal Australian Navy (1989–1996); Naval Reserve (1996–present)
- Years of service: 1989–present
- Rank: Lieutenant
- Unit: HMAS Stirling
- Awards: Commendation for Brave Conduct

Mark McGowan AC (born 13 July 1967) is an Australian former politician and naval officer who served as the 30th premier of Western Australia from 2017 to 2023. He was the leader of the Western Australian branch of the Australian Labor Party (ALP) from 2012 to 2023 and a member of the Legislative Assembly (MLA) for the district of Rockingham from 1996 to 2023.

McGowan was born and raised in Newcastle, New South Wales. He attended the University of Queensland and worked as a legal officer for the Royal Australian Navy, serving at naval base HMAS Stirling, south of Perth. Settling in Western Australia, he was elected as a councillor for the City of Rockingham from 1994, and was later elected to the Western Australian Legislative Assembly at the 1996 election, representing the district of Rockingham. In 2001, he was made Parliamentary Secretary to Premier Geoff Gallop, and was later a Cabinet Minister in both the Gallop and Carpenter Governments from 2005 to 2008.

McGowan was elected as Leader of the Labor Party in Western Australia following the resignation of Eric Ripper, and became Leader of the Opposition in the Legislative Assembly. Although he led Labor to defeat at the 2013 election, he retained his position as leader, and embarked upon a "listening tour" of the state, pledging to restore Labor's credibility with voters. McGowan subsequently grew in popularity, and went on to lead Labor to a landslide victory at the 2017 election, winning the largest majority government in the state's history at the time. He was subsequently appointed the 30th Premier of Western Australia.

Throughout 2020, McGowan led Western Australia's response to the COVID-19 pandemic, during which time he reached a record-breaking approval rating for an Australian premier of 91%. At the 2021 election, he led his party to an even larger landslide victory, winning 53 out of 59 seats in the Legislative Assembly, and also winning a majority in the Legislative Council. This was the largest victory in terms of both vote share and proportion of lower house seats occupied in Australian electoral history. He resigned as premier and as a member of parliament on 8 June 2023.

== Early life and naval career ==
McGowan was born into a family of Irish descent in Newcastle, New South Wales, and was educated at public schools in Casino and Coffs Harbour, before obtaining a Bachelor of Arts degree in 1987 and a Bachelor of Laws in 1989 from the University of Queensland. He joined the Australian Labor Party in 1984, stating that he was inspired by the leadership of Prime Minister Bob Hawke. In 1989, he joined the Royal Australian Navy as a legal officer. He served at the naval base HMAS Stirling, reaching the rank of lieutenant. In 1996, he was awarded a Commendation for Brave Conduct, for actions he took on service in 1995 for rescuing an unconscious driver from a burning car.

== Early political career ==
In 1994, after settling with his family in Western Australia, McGowan was elected to the City of Rockingham Council, and in 1995 was appointed Deputy Mayor. He was subsequently pre-selected to run for the Western Australian Legislative Assembly in the seat of Rockingham at the 1996 election, following the retirement of long-serving MP Mike Barnett.

At the 2001 election, Labor defeated the Liberal–National Government; new Premier Geoff Gallop chose to appoint McGowan as his Parliamentary Secretary. McGowan was also responsible for chairing the state's ANZAC Committee, the group managing the Western Australia's 175th anniversary celebrations in 2004, and for chairing the Bali Memorial Steering Committee. In January 2005, following the retirement of federal Labor Leader Mark Latham from politics, McGowan was criticised in some quarters for taking unapproved leave to travel to Sydney to lobby for Kim Beazley's return to the federal leadership; Gallop reprimanded McGowan and ordered him to return to Perth.

Following Labor's win at the 2005 election, Gallop reshuffled his Ministry, and promoted McGowan to the role of Minister for Tourism, Racing and Gaming. Later that year, following Gallop's retirement, McGowan was moved to the role of Minister for the Environment by new Premier Alan Carpenter. During his time in the Ministry, McGowan introduced major liquor reforms, including the introduction of small bars, created the Department of Environment and Conservation, and provided approval for the Gorgon gas project.

In December 2006, following the resignation of Ljiljanna Ravlich, Carpenter appointed McGowan to replace her as Minister for Education and Training. In this portfolio, McGowan oversaw the replacement of outcomes-based education with syllabus documents, re-established traditional forms of marking and reporting, and launched a renewed effort towards the attraction and retention of teachers.

In April 2008, McGowan was criticised by some for referring to ex-Labor MP John D'Orazio as "the worst ethnic branch stacker in the history of Labor in Western Australia"; both McGowan and Premier Carpenter apologised for the remarks. McGowan later apologised to anyone who took offence to the remark. The issue returned to the media spotlight when it was revealed that McGowan had had some dealings over fundraising with the controversial politician Brian Burke during the 2005 election.

== Leader of the Opposition ==
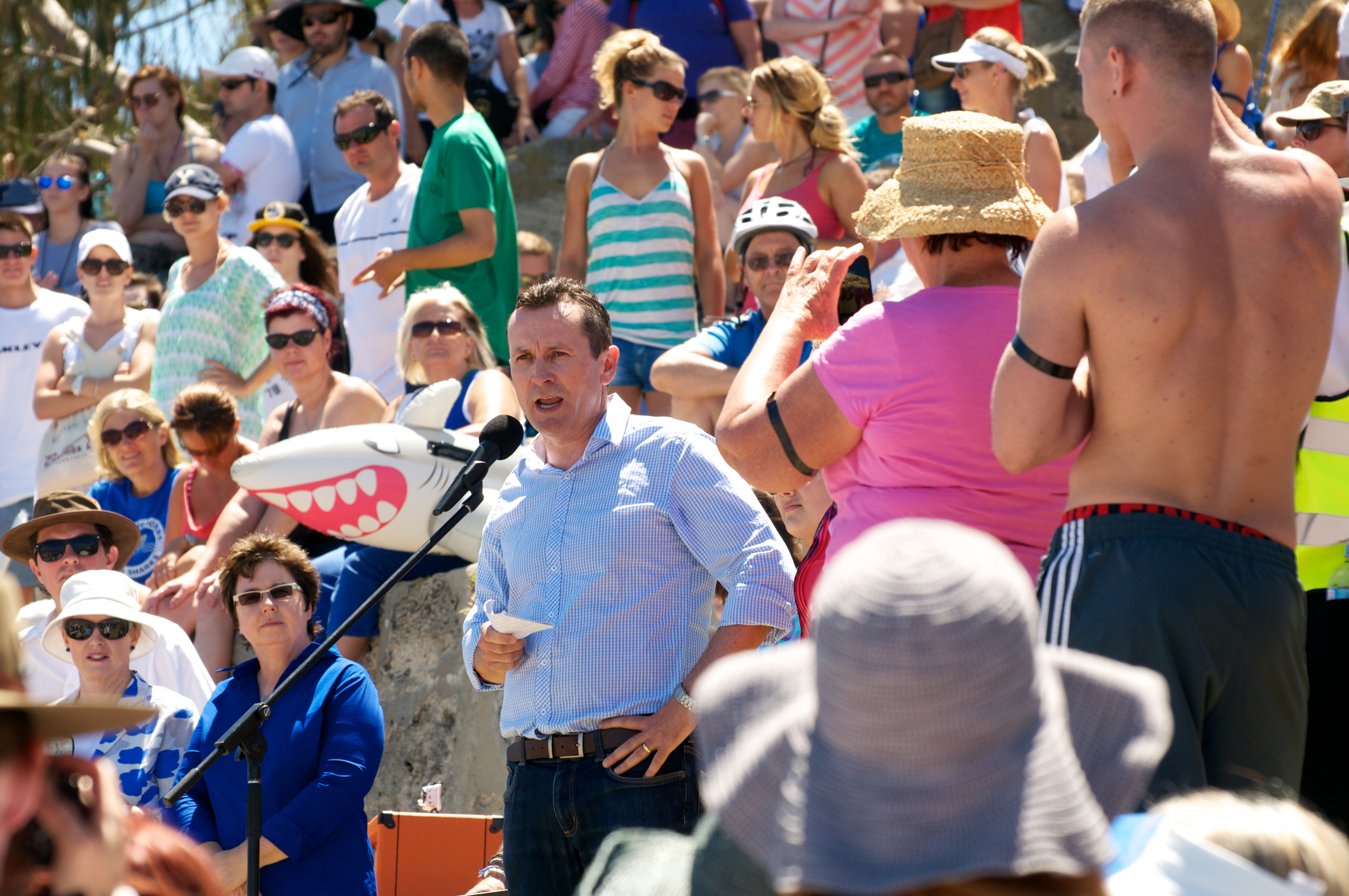
McGowan addressing a rally in 2014

After Labor's defeat at the 2008 election, Alan Carpenter resigned as Leader of the Labor Party in Western Australia; McGowan was considered one of several contenders to replace him, but he chose not to run, instead supporting the eventual winner Eric Ripper, who was elected unopposed. McGowan did choose to contest the election for Deputy Leader, but lost to newcomer Roger Cook by 30 votes to 9. Ripper appointed McGowan to the Shadow Ministry as Shadow Minister for State Development, Trade, Planning, Housing and Works, and was also appointed as Manager of Opposition Business in the Legislative Assembly.

On 17 January 2012, following declining performances in opinion polls, Eric Ripper announced that he would resign as Leader of the Opposition. At a caucus meeting on 23 January, McGowan was elected unopposed as Ripper's successor, becoming Leader of the Opposition. Despite an initial improvement in Labor's standing in opinion polls, Labor ultimately suffered a 5.4 percent swing against it at the 2013 election, losing five seats. Despite this, McGowan was not blamed for the loss, and was unanimously confirmed as party leader by his colleagues.

After Labor's 2013 defeat, McGowan launched a "listening tour" of the state, pledging that he would enact policy reforms to address the reasons for Labor suffering two defeats in a row. Soon after this process, opinion polls began to show increasingly large swings of support away from the second-term Barnett Government. By 2015, polls began to report McGowan had a more comfortable lead as preferred Premier of Western Australia.

=== Leadership challenge ===
In early 2016, McGowan's leadership was briefly challenged by former federal minister Stephen Smith, who stated he had been approached by both frontbenchers and backbenchers to lead the party to the upcoming 2017 election. Smith argued that Labor needed a higher-profile figure to achieve the swing required to form government. However, the Labor shadow cabinet issued a unanimous statement of support for McGowan and urged Smith to withdraw. The challenge was publicly criticised by a number of senior Labor figures as a destabilising "vanity project", and McGowan received backing from former federal Labor leader Kim Beazley, who described him as someone who could "deliver a government". Smith withdrew his bid after it became clear he lacked sufficient caucus support, and McGowan emerged from the episode with strengthened internal backing.

== Premier of Western Australia (2017–2023) ==
At the 2017 election, McGowan led the Labor Party to one of its most comprehensive victories at either the state or territory level since Federation. Labor won 41 of the 59 seats on 55.5 percent of the two-party vote, the largest majority government in Western Australian history. Labor also took 20 seats off the incumbent Liberal–National government on a swing of 12.8 percent, the worst defeat of a sitting government in Western Australian history. Seven members of Barnett's cabinet were defeated, including Nationals Leader Brendon Grylls. His own margin in Rockingham swelled from an already comfortably safe 13.2 percent to 23.4 percent.

McGowan's win was built primarily on the strength of a dominating performance in Perth. Labor picked up a swing of 13.6 percent in Perth and took all but nine of the capital's 43 seats, accounting for almost all of its majority. According to Antony Green of ABC News, the 10-point swing Labor theoretically needed to win was not as daunting as it seemed on paper. Besides the one vote one value reforms in 2008 that allowed Perth to elect over 70 percent of the legislature, much of the Liberals' 2013 margin was built on inflated margins in Perth's outer suburbs.

McGowan was sworn in by Governor Kerry Sanderson as the 30th Premier of Western Australia on 17 March 2017. Early in his premiership, McGowan moved to limit the number of pathways for foreign workers to enter the state, re-committed to terminating the controversial Perth Freight Link highway project, which had proved extremely unpopular in large parts of the state, and he restructured various government departments. McGowan also introduced unlimited fines and life imprisonment for people deemed to be trafficking methamphetamine, and worked to expand Chinese investment in Western Australia.

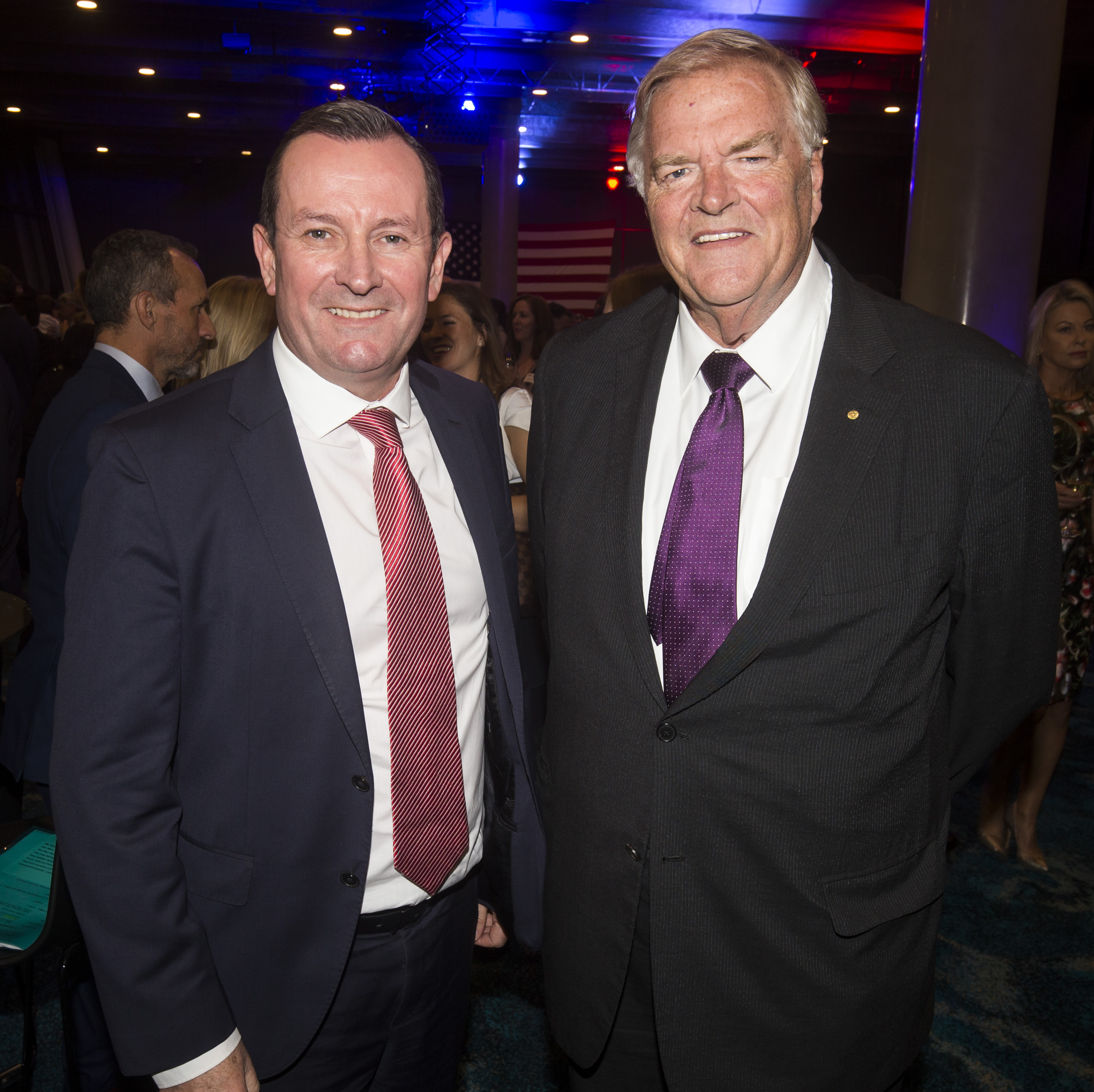
McGowan and Kim Beazley

On 1 May 2018, Kim Beazley was sworn in to a four-year term as governor upon the recommendation of McGowan. He was the first ex-politician to become governor since Sir James Mitchell in 1948. His appointment was generally well received, although some people had reservations that a republican had become the Queen's representative and that Beazley was close friends with McGowan.

McGowan had ministerial responsibility for the Perth Mint between the 2017 and 2021 elections. In 2018, the Mint commenced doping its gold bars with lower value metals. The Shanghai Gold Exchange later discovered that some of the gold it bought from the Perth Mint contained more silver than was allowed under its standards. The Perth Mint covered this up when alerted and it was only made public by an ABC Four Corners investigation. The Mint has also been under investigation by AUSTRAC for having potentially breached anti-money laundering laws.

=== Response to the COVID-19 pandemic (2020–2021) ===
Painted Dog Research approval polls
Month	Satisfied	Dissatisfied
June 2020	87%	5%
September 2020	91%	5%
February 2021	88%	7%
December 2021	77%	14%
February 2022	64%	25%
March 2022	68%	
October 2022	70%	18%
March 2023	63%	24%

Throughout 2020 and 2021, McGowan led Western Australia's response to the COVID-19 pandemic. He acted early to close the state's borders to the rest of the country on 5 April. In July 2020, businessman Clive Palmer claimed that the closing of the borders was unconstitutional and launched a legal challenge in the Federal Court. The case was defeated, and in response McGowan labelled Palmer an "enemy of the state". Shortly afterwards, McGowan's popularity in opinion polls dramatically increased, reaching 91% approval in September 2020, a record for any Australian premier.

In January 2021, McGowan criticised the New South Wales Government's response and attitude towards the pandemic, contrasting it with that of his own Government's response. In March 2021, he suggested that some internal Australian border controls could be continued after the pandemic, on the grounds that they had helped to keep illegal drugs out of Western Australia, but clarified later that he meant to suggest only an increased police presence at border checkpoints, rather than completely sealing the border.

=== 2021 election ===
In the lead up to the 2021 election, WA Labor raced out to a large lead in opinion polls, leading to speculation that the McGowan Government would be reelected with another record majority. Labor approached 70% in the two-party preferred polls, with McGowan maintaining a personal approval rating of 88%. Opposition Leader Zak Kirkup took the unprecedented step of conceding the election more than a fortnight before election day. On 13 March 2021, WA Labor won the most comprehensive victory, in terms of vote share and percentage of seats controlled, at any level in Australia since Federation. Labor took 69.7 percent of the two-party vote and picked up a 13-seat swing, ultimately winning 53 out of 59 seats, including all but one in Perth. Labor even managed to defeat Kirkup in his own seat. McGowan's own margin in Rockingham increased to 37.7 percent, making Rockingham the safest seat in the state.

Claiming victory, McGowan stated that the victory was "beyond humbling" and pledged that the Government would work to retain the support of the majority of Western Australians.

=== Second term ===
McGowan announced his new cabinet on 18 March 2021. Among various changes, he opted to serve as his own treasurer, after Ben Wyatt, the previous treasurer, retired at the 2021 election. The two other ministers viewed as possible candidates, Roger Cook and Rita Saffioti, had existing important roles that McGowan wanted them to continue with. Cook was health minister and thus had an important role in the state's COVID-19 response, and Saffioti was transport and planning minister, overseeing the government's Metronet project. Prior to 2001, WA premiers generally served as their own treasurers, but since then, the only premier to hold that position before McGowan was Colin Barnett briefly in 2010, 2012 and 2014.

McGowan announced the formation of a panel to examine potential reform of the Western Australian Legislative Council voting system soon after the 2021 election, after denying he would implement reforms to the Legislative Council voting system several times during the election. The panel was led by former Governor of Western Australia Malcolm McCusker, and consisted of four electoral and constitutional law experts. McGowan and Electoral Affairs Minister John Quigley said the election of Wilson Tucker with 98 primary votes was a key reason for their change of mind. In September 2021, McGowan announced the changes to be made to the voting system, including abolishing regions in the Legislative Council, and removing group voting tickets. Also that month, he handed down the Western Australian state budget, which recorded a sizeable surplus of $5.6 billion.

On 13 December 2021, McGowan announced that Western Australia would fully open its borders to COVID-19 vaccinated people from interstate and overseas on 5 February 2022. On 20 January 2022, McGowan reversed his decision on the plan for Western Australia to fully open its borders, saying that the Omicron variant of COVID-19 was more contagious than previous variants of the virus and that the state's vaccination booster levels were not high enough to safely reopen to the world. A February opinion poll showed that his approval rating had decreased to 64%, the lowest during the pandemic, but still comparatively high to premiers in other states. On 18 February, McGowan announced the border would reopen on 3 March for people from outside Australia and triple vaccinated people from interstate.

When Beazley's term as governor finished in 2022, McGowan recommended WA Police Commissioner Chris Dawson as his replacement. Dawson was sworn in on 15 July 2022.

=== Resignation and retirement from politics ===
Utting Research approval polls
Month	Satisfied	Dissatisfied
May 2023	68%	19%

On 29 May 2023, McGowan announced he would step down as premier and member for Rockingham. He cited his exhaustion from the relentless pressures of the job as the reason for his resignation. In her valedictory speech in the Legislative Council in April 2025, retiring senior frontbencher Sue Ellery stated, "I was distressed when Mark decided to step down as Premier," and said that she and a number of other colleagues had "begged him not to go".

McGowan went on leave following 2 June, and formally resigned on 8 June. A leadership election of the Labor Party caucus was held decide his replacement. Despite initially being a three way contest between Roger Cook, Rita Saffioti and Amber-Jade Sanderson, both Saffioti and Sanderson withdrew leaving Cook as the only nominee, he was subsequently elected to succeed McGowan, with Rita Saffioti as his deputy. In October 2024, McGowan said he does not miss politics and that he had "done everything I wanted to do [and] never wanted to go into federal parliament".

== Career after politics ==
In August 2024, McGowan was appointed non-executive chairman of the ASX-listed renewable energy company Frontier Energy. He has also advised BHP, Mineral Resources, and Bondi Partners, a consultancy firm run by Joe Hockey. He was also appointed to the advisory board of the National Foundation for Australia-China Relations. In September 2026, he was appointed to the board of Southern Cross Media. The following month, he joined the board of property developer Built.

== Political views ==
McGowan has described his political strategy as "centrist", saying "you have got to appeal to everyone". He credited that strategy as one of the reasons for his 2021 landslide election.

As of 2021, McGowan was one of six Labor MPs in the state parliament who were not factionally aligned.

== Personal life ==
Since 1996, McGowan has been married to Sarah McGowan, with whom he has three children.

== Honours ==
McGowan was appointed a Companion of the Order of Australia in the 2024 King's Birthday Honours for "eminent service to the people and Parliament of Western Australia, to public health and education, and to international trade relations".

He was awarded an honorary doctorate from the Tokyo City University in 2017 and the University of Western Australia in 2024.

Western Australian Legislative Assembly
Preceded by Mike Barnett	Member for Rockingham; 1996–2023	Succeeded by Magenta Marshall
Political offices
Preceded by Eric Ripper	Leader of the Opposition; 2012–2017	Succeeded by Mike Nahan
Preceded by Colin Barnett	Premier of Western Australia; 2017–2023	Succeeded by Roger Cook
Preceded by Ben Wyatt	Treasurer of Western Australia; 2021–2023	Succeeded by Rita Saffioti
Party political offices
Preceded by Eric Ripper	Leader of the Labor Party in Western Australia; 2012–2023	Succeeded by Roger Cook
