= Western Australian Labor Party =

Affiliate of the Labor Party in West Australia

WA Labor Western Australian Labor Party
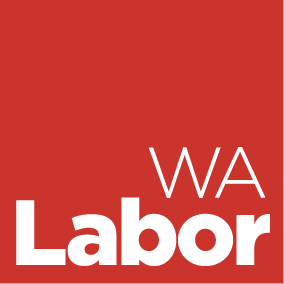
- Abbreviation: WA Labor
- Leader: Roger Cook
- Deputy Leader: Rita Saffioti
- Founded: 11–15 April 1899; 127 years ago
- Headquarters: 85 Havelock Street, West Perth, Western Australian
- Youth wing: WA Young Labor
- Membership (2018): ▲ <7,000
- Ideology: Social democracy
- Political position: Centre-left
- National affiliation: Australian Labor
- Colours: Red
- Legislative Assembly: 45 / 59
- Legislative Council: 16 / 37
- House of Representatives: 9 / 15 (WA seats)
- Senate: 5 / 12 (WA seats)

Website
- walabor.org.au

The Western Australian Labor Party, officially known as WA Labor, (Note: The party was formally named the Australian Labor Party (Western Australian Branch). The party name was officially changed to WA Labor in 2023.) is the Western Australian branch of the Australian Labor Party (ALP). It is the current governing party of Western Australia since winning the 2017 state election under Mark McGowan.

== History ==
The Western Australian state division of the Australian Labor Party was formed at a Trade Union Congress in Coolgardie in 1899. Shortly afterwards the federal Labor Party was formalised in time for Australian federation in 1901. The WA Labor Party achieved representation in the Western Australian Parliament in 1900 with six members; four years later, the party entered into minority government with Henry Daglish becoming the first Labor Premier of Western Australia.

== Governance ==
There are five layers of governance in the WA Labor Party. These governance layers are filled with people from the party's general membership, as well as delegates from affiliated unions to the party.

The five governance layers are:

1. The Branches
2. The Federal Electorate Campaign Committees (FECC)
3. The State Executive
4. The State Conference, and
5. The Administrative Committee

Of these governance layers, the only level at which ALP members directly participate in their membership capacity is at the branch level. However, branch members are able to be elected as delegates to participate at FECC meetings; and FECC participants in turn may be elected to participate at the State Executive and State Conference. Members of the Administrative committee are at regular intervals during the annual state conferences.

Affiliated trade unions are allocated voting delegates to participate at the State Conference and State Executive layers. Due to these legal rules, the ALP is strongly influenced by its affiliated trade unions. Additionally, union members who are a member of the ALP are allowed to participate in their personal capacity at branch meetings and FECC meetings; which is another, albeit indirect, means of influence at State Executive and Conference.

Of the five governance layers, the State Executive is notable for having the primary responsible for candidate preselection. Mostly for this reason, its control is the primary objective of party factions attempting to exert their influence. As of 2023, it is dominated by the Labor Left.

=== Branches ===
Members of the WA Labor Party usually belong to a single branch, chosen by that member.

There are two types of branches; (1) Local branches, which are organised around a local geographic area, and (2) Direct branches, which are organised around a political issue or broader community group.

Branch members regularly meet to discuss political issues, socialise, meet ALP politicians, fundraise, and organise campaign activities. They also frequently pass resolutions, which act as public statements regarding the opinion of the branch on an issue.

Annually, each branch will elect a delegate to attend their relevant 'Federal Electorate Campaign Committee' this person will then vote on their behalf at FECC meetings. It is through this delegate that branch members have an indirect influence on ALP preselections.

=== Federal Electorate Campaign Committees ===
Australia's federal electorates often contain multiple ALP branches within them. Each branch of the party elects a representative at their annual general meeting, and that delegate will attend the FECC covering their federal electorate.

FECCs meet regularly to discuss party issues. Each one elects delegates to represent it at the State Executive.

=== State Executive ===
The state executive of the party is a singular body made up of various delegates. It meets multiple times per year. It is the chief administrative authority of the party, and is vested with the party's power in-between the annual state conferences. It is made up of 175 persons.

Its most noteworthy power is over preselections of ALP candidates for elections.

The State executive comprises

- The State President, who presides and is allowed a casting vote
- All fourteen members of the party's Administrative Committee
- Eighty "political delegates":
  - One delegate from the FPLP
  - One delegate from the SPLP
  - 78 Delegates elected by the FECCs
- Eighty "union delegates" (allocated proportionally according to union membership numbers)

The current composition of the WA Labor State Executive is not publicly available information.

In recent history the WA State Executive has been dominated by the labor left faction, however, this is not always so. Decisions of the State Executive are often determined by whichever ALP factional combination is able to dominate the floor at a given point in time.

=== State Conference ===
The party meets annually at its State Conference. It is the ultimate governing body of the State Party. The conference comprises delegates from Branches, affiliated unions, and ALP Parliamentary representatives. As the ultimate governing body, it has the power to overrule decisions of the State Executive, although this rarely occurs in practice.

The State Conference floor comprises

- The State President, who presides and is allowed a casting vote
- All fourteen members of the party's Administrative Committee
- 150 "political delegates":
  - One FPLP Delegate
  - One SPLP Delegate
  - The remainder being delegates from the various ALP branches, allocated proportionally based on the membership numbers of each branch. However, every branch with at least 30 or more members is entitled to at least one of the delegates
- 150 "union delegates" allocated by the State Executive in proportion to annual membership of each union in the previous calendar year

The composition of the State Conference floor for 2023 is not publicly available information.

In recent history the WA State Conference floor has been dominated by the labor left faction, however, this is not always so. Decisions of the State Conference are often determined by whichever ALP factional combination is able to dominate the floor at a given point in time.

=== Administrative Committee ===
The party's administrative committee is ultimately responsible for the party's management and administration. The committee has 15 members, if the State President (who must preside) is included. At least 50% of committee is reserved for women.

Meetings of the committee are presided over by the State President. The position of State President is elected every two years through a mail-ballot of the party membership. This distinguishes them from other members that are decided instead at State Conference. At meetings of the administrative committee, the president is only allowed a casting vote.

The State Treasurer must attend all meetings but does not vote.

Therefore, meetings of the administrative committee are attended by

- Ten members elected annually at State Conference
- Both the State Secretary and the Assistant State Secretary, each of whom are separately elected triannually at State Conference; one of whom must be a woman
- The leader of the State Parliamentary Labor Party (Note: Or a member of the State front-bench acting as their representative.)
- A representative of the Federal Parliamentary Labor Party
- The State Treasurer (who does not vote)
- The State President (who merely presides, and is allowed a casting vote)

=== Policy committees ===
The party's policy committees are responsible for the party's development of the party platform between state conferences and elections. The committees are composed of elected convenors who are tasked with facilitating policy development at the party member level and secretaries who work at the parliamentary level.

=== Party leaders ===
| Party leader | Assumed office | Left office | Premier | Reason for departure |
|---|---|---|---|---|
| Henry Daglish | 8 July 1904 | 27 September 1905 | 1904–1905 | Quit party |
| William Johnson | 4 October 1905 | 27 October 1905 | | Resigned |
| Thomas Bath | 22 November 1905 | 3 August 1910 | | |
| John Scaddan | 3 August 1910 | 10 April 1917 | 1911–1916 | Quit party |
| Phillip Collier | 16 April 1917 | 20 August 1936 | 1924–1930; 1933–1936 | Resigned |
| John Willcock | 20 August 1936 | 31 July 1945 | 1936–1945 | Retired |
| Frank Wise | 31 July 1945 | 26 June 1951 | 1945–1947 | Resigned to be appointed Administrator of the Northern Territory |
| Bert Hawke | 26 June 1951 | 31 December 1966 | 1953–1959 | Retired |
| John Tonkin | 31 December 1966 | 15 April 1976 | 1971–1974 | Retired |
| Colin Jamieson | 15 April 1976 | 21 February 1978 | | Lost party room challenge to Davies |
| Ron Davies | 21 February 1978 | 18 September 1981 | | Lost party room challenge to Burke |
| Brian Burke | 18 September 1981 | 25 February 1988 | 1983–1988 | Retired |
| Peter Dowding | 25 February 1998 | 12 February 1990 | 1988–1990 | Lost party room challenge to Lawrence |
| Carmen Lawrence | 12 February 1990 | 7 February 1994 | 1990–1993 | Resigned |
| Ian Taylor | 7 February 1994 | 12 October 1994 | | |
| Jim McGinty | 12 October 1994 | 15 October 1996 | | Resigned |
| Geoff Gallop | 8 October 1996 | 25 January 2006 | 2001–2006 | Retired |
| Alan Carpenter | 25 January 2006 | 16 September 2008 | 2006–2008 | Retired after 2008 election loss |
| Eric Ripper | 16 September 2008 | 23 January 2012 | | Resigned |
| Mark McGowan | 23 January 2012 | 6 June 2023 | 2017–2023 | Resigned |
| Roger Cook | 6 June 2023 | present | 2023– | |

== Electoral performance ==
=== Legislative Assembly ===
| Election | Leader | Votes | % | Seats | +/– | Position | Status |
|---|---|---|---|---|---|---|---|
| 1897 | None | 383 | 4.38 | 1 / 44 | ▲1 | ▲3rd | Crossbench |
| 1901 | None | 9,658 | 25.88 | 6 / 50 | ▲5 | 3rd | Crossbench |
| 1904 | Robert Hastie | 28,122 | 42.57 | 22 / 50 | ▲16 | ▲1st | Opposition (1904) |
| 1904 | Robert Hastie | 28,122 | 42.57 | 22 / 50 | ▲16 | ▲1st | Minority (1904–1905) |
| 1904 | Robert Hastie | 28,122 | 42.57 | 22 / 50 | ▲16 | ▲1st | Opposition (1905) |
| 1905 | William Johnson | 18,364 | 35.07 | 14 / 50 | ▼8 | ▼2nd | Opposition |
| 1908 | Thomas Bath | 28,325 | 37.80 | 22 / 50 | ▲8 | 2nd | Opposition |
| 1911 | John Scaddan | 47,558 | 52.64 | 34 / 50 | ▲12 | ▲1st | Majority |
| 1914 | John Scaddan | 40,205 | 42.12 | 26 / 50 | ▼8 | 1st | Majority (1914–1915) |
| 1914 | John Scaddan | 40,205 | 42.12 | 26 / 50 | ▼8 | 1st | Minority (1915–1917) |
| 1914 | John Scaddan | 40,205 | 42.12 | 26 / 50 | ▼8 | 1st | Opposition (1917) |
| 1917 | Philip Collier | 20,867 | 24.79 | 15 / 50 | ▼11 | 1st | Opposition |
| 1921 | Philip Collier | 35,829 | 36.81 | 17 / 50 | ▲2 | 1st | Opposition |
| 1924 | Philip Collier | 39,679 | 40.39 | 27 / 50 | ▲10 | 1st | Majority |
| 1927 | Philip Collier | 63,687 | 45.33 | 27 / 50 | Steady | 1st | Majority |
| 1930 | Philip Collier | 52,824 | 38.44 | 23 / 50 | ▼4 | 1st | Opposition |
| 1933 | Philip Collier | 82,702 | 45.48 | 30 / 50 | ▲7 | 1st | Majority |
| 1936 | Philip Collier | 57,055 | 42.33 | 26 / 50 | ▼4 | 1st | Majority |
| 1939 | John Willcock | 92,585 | 45.02 | 27 / 50 | ▲1 | 1st | Majority |
| 1943 | John Willcock | 77,567 | 43.28 | 30 / 50 | ▲3 | 1st | Majority |
| 1947 | Frank Wise | 64,377 | 39.38 | 23 / 50 | ▼7 | 1st | Opposition |
| 1950 | Frank Wise | 94,055 | 41.85 | 23 / 50 | Steady | 1st | Opposition |
| 1953 | Albert Hawke | 93,157 | 49.76 | 26 / 50 | ▲3 | 1st | Majority |
| 1956 | Albert Hawke | 116,793 | 49.70 | 29 / 50 | ▲3 | 1st | Majority |
| 1959 | Albert Hawke | 117,861 | 44.92 | 23 / 50 | ▼6 | 1st | Opposition |
| 1962 | Albert Hawke | 129,757 | 44.41 | 24 / 50 | ▲1 | 1st | Opposition |
| 1965 | Albert Hawke | 128,025 | 42.64 | 21 / 50 | ▼3 | ▼2nd | Opposition |
| 1968 | John Tonkin | 145,605 | 45.35 | 23 / 51 | ▲2 | ▲1st | Opposition |
| 1971 | John Tonkin | 230,653 | 48.91 | 26 / 51 | ▲3 | 1st | Majority |
| 1974 | John Tonkin | 248,395 | 48.10 | 22 / 51 | ▼4 | ▼2nd | Opposition |
| 1977 | Colin Jamieson | 257,730 | 44.22 | 22 / 55 | Steady | 2nd | Opposition |
| 1980 | Ron Davies | 270,165 | 45.95 | 23 / 55 | ▲1 | 2nd | Opposition |
| 1983 | Brian Burke | 342,536 | 53.16 | 32 / 57 | ▲9 | ▲1st | Majority |
| 1986 | Brian Burke | 416,805 | 53.00 | 32 / 57 | Steady | 1st | Majority |
| 1989 | Peter Dowding | 341,931 | 42.46 | 31 / 57 | ▼1 | 1st | Majority |
| 1993 | Carmen Lawrence | 338,008 | 37.08 | 24 / 57 | ▼7 | ▼2nd | Opposition |
| 1996 | Geoff Gallop | 345,159 | 35.82 | 19 / 57 | ▼5 | ▼2nd | Opposition |
| 2001 | Geoff Gallop | 382,308 | 37.24 | 32 / 57 | ▲13 | ▲1st | Majority |
| 2005 | Geoff Gallop | 448,956 | 41.88 | 32 / 57 | Steady | 1st | Majority |
| 2008 | Alan Carpenter | 390,339 | 35.84 | 28 / 59 | ▼4 | 1st | Opposition |
| 2013 | Mark McGowan | 392,448 | 33.13 | 21 / 59 | ▼7 | ▼2nd | Opposition |
| 2017 | Mark McGowan | 557,794 | 42.20 | 41 / 59 | ▲20 | ▲1st | Majority |
| 2021 | Mark McGowan | 846,116 | 59.92 | 53 / 59 | ▲12 | 1st | Majority |
| 2025 | Roger Cook | 633,093 | 41.43 | 46 / 59 | ▼7 | 1st | Majority |
