= Lawrence ministry =

The Lawrence Ministry was the 31st Ministry of the Government of Western Australia, and was led by Labor Premier Carmen Lawrence and her deputy Ian Taylor. It succeeded the Dowding Ministry on 18 February 1990, following the resignation of Peter Dowding six days earlier following an open letter signed by a majority of the 47-member Labor caucus. The ministry was in turn succeeded by the Court–Cowan Ministry on 16 February 1993 after the Labor Party lost government at the state election held on 6 February.

== Overview ==
Of the former Dowding ministry, 15 of the 17 ministers retained office—Peter Dowding and Julian Grill were not reappointed, and backbenchers Pam Buchanan (Ashburton) and Geoff Gallop (Victoria Park) took their place. Two months later, former Deputy Premier David Parker resigned from both the Ministry and from Parliament.

At a caucus meeting held on 29 January 1991, a spill motion was carried which created three vacancies in the Ministry. On 5 February, Jeff Carr, Gavan Troy and Pam Buchanan were removed as Ministers, whilst Eric Ripper, Judyth Watson and Jim McGinty were sworn in. A major crisis was precipitated when Carr resigned from Parliament, with his seat of Geraldton being won by a Liberal at a by-election, whilst Troy ceased to attend caucus meetings and Buchanan resigned from the party, sitting as an Independent. With the resignation of left-wing MLA Ian Alexander a month later, the Government was forced to depend on independents in the Legislative Assembly to maintain supply—the first time Western Australia had had minority government since 1905.

== First Ministry ==
On 16 February 1990, the Lieutenant-Governor and Administrator, Sir Francis Burt, constituted the Ministry. He designated 17 principal executive offices of the Government and appointed the following ministers to their positions, and served until the reconstitution of the Ministry on 5 February 1991. The list below is ordered by decreasing seniority within the Cabinet, as indicated by the Government Gazette and the Hansard index.

The members of the Ministry were:

| Office | Minister |
|---|---|
| Premier and Treasurer; Minister for Public Sector Management; Minister for the Family; Minister for Aboriginal Affairs; Minister for Multicultural and Ethnic Affairs; Minister for Women's Interests | Carmen Lawrence, BPsych, PhD, MLA |
| Deputy Premier; Minister for Finance and Economic Development (until 20 December 1990); Minister for Trade (30 April^{[1]}-20 December 1990); Minister for State Development (from 20 December 1990); Minister for the Goldfields (until 26 November 1992); Minister for the Mid-West (7 September – 26 November 1992) | Ian Taylor, B.Econ (Hons), JP, MLA |
| Attorney-General; Minister for Resources (30 April^{[1]}-20 December 1990); Minister for Corrective Services; Leader of the Government in the Legislative Council | Joe Berinson, LL.B., QC, MLC |
| Minister for Planning; Minister for Lands; Minister for Heritage; Minister for the Arts (from 30 April 1990)^{[1]} Minister assisting the Minister for Women's Interests (until 30 April 1990); Deputy Leader of the Government in the Legislative Council | Kay Hallahan, BSW, JP, MLC |
| Minister for Mines; Minister for Fuel and Energy; Minister for the Mid-West; Minister for Small Business (until 20 December 1990) | Jeff Carr, BA, JP, MLA |
| Minister for Resources and Trade; Minister for the Arts | David Parker, BA, JP, MLA (until 30 April 1990)^{[1]} |
| Minister for the Environment; Minister for Conservation and Land Management; Minister for Waterways; Leader of the House in the Legislative Assembly | Bob Pearce, BA, DipEd, JP, MLA |
| Minister for Health | Rev Keith Wilson, MLA |
| Minister for Productivity and Labour Relations; Minister assisting the Minister for Education with TAFE; Minister assisting the Minister for Public Sector Management | Gavan Troy, B Bus, FAIM, JP, MLA |
| Minister for Transport; Minister for Racing and Gaming; Minister for Tourism | Pam Beggs, JP, MLA |
| Minister for Agriculture; Minister for Water Resources; Minister for the North-West | Ernie Bridge, JP, MLA |
| Minister for Local Government; Minister for Fisheries; Minister for Sport and Recreation; Minister for Youth | Gordon Hill, JP, MLA |
| Minister for Police; Minister for Emergency Services; Minister for the Aged | Graham Edwards, MLC |
| Minister for Housing; Minister for Consumer Affairs | Yvonne Henderson, BA, DipEd, JP, MLA |
| Minister for Community Services; Minister for Justice; Minister for the South-West | David Smith, LL.B., JP, MLA |
| Minister for Works and Services; Minister for Regional Development (until 20 December 1990); Minister assisting the Minister for Aboriginal Affairs | Pam Buchanan, JP, MLA |
| Minister for Education; Minister for Parliamentary and Electoral Reform; Minister assisting the Treasurer (from 20 December 1990) | Geoff Gallop, BEc, MA, MPhil, D.Phil. (Oxon), MLA |

^{1} On 5 April 1990, former Deputy Premier and Treasurer David Parker announced his imminent resignation from the Ministry and from Parliament. His former responsibilities were shared across three other ministers.

== Second Ministry ==
On 5 February 1991, the Governor, Sir Francis Burt, reconstituted the Ministry. He designated 16 principal executive offices of the Government and appointed the ministers to their positions. The appointed members remained Ministers until the end of the Lawrence Ministry on 16 February 1993.

| Office | Minister |
|---|---|
| Premier and Treasurer (until 7 September 1992:) Minister for the Family Minister for Women's Interests (from 7 September 1992:) Minister for Employment Minister for Trade and Investment | Carmen Lawrence, BPsych, PhD, MLA |
| Deputy Premier; Minister for Health (from 26 November 1992)^{[3]} Minister for State Development; Minister for the Goldfields (until 26 November 1992); Minister for the Mid-West (7 September – 26 November 1992) | Ian Taylor, B.Econ (Hons), JP, MLA |
| Attorney-General; Minister for Corrective Services; Leader of the Government in the Legislative Council | Joe Berinson, LL.B., QC, MLC |
| Minister for Education; Minister for Employment and Training (until 7 September 1992); Minister for Training (from 7 September 1992); Minister for the Arts; Deputy Leader of the Government in the Legislative Council | Kay Hallahan, BSW, JP, MLC |
| Minister for the Environment; Leader of the House in the Legislative Assembly | Bob Pearce, BA, DipEd, JP, MLA (until 21 October 1992)^{[2]} |
| Minister for Health | Rev Keith Wilson, MLA (until 13 November 1992)^{[3]} |
| Minister for Transport; Minister for Racing and Gaming; Minister for Tourism | Pam Beggs, JP, MLA |
| Minister for Agriculture; Minister for Water Resources; Minister for the North-West | Ernie Bridge, JP, MLA |
| Minister for Mines; Minister for Small Business (from 7 September 1992); Minister for Fisheries; Minister for Sport and Recreation (until 27 February 1991); Minister for the Mid-West (until 7 September 1992); Minister assisting the Minister for State Development (until 7 September 1992); Minister assisting the Minister for Trade and Investment (from 7 September 1992) | Gordon Hill, JP, MLA |
| Minister for Police; Minister for Emergency Services; Minister for the Aged (until 27 February 1991); Minister for Sport and Recreation (from 27 February 1991) | Graham Edwards, MLC |
| Minister for Productivity and Labour Relations; Minister for Consumer Affairs | Yvonne Henderson, BA, DipEd, JP, MLA |
| Minister for Lands; Minister for Planning; Minister for Justice; Minister for Local Government; Minister for the South-West | David Smith, LL.B., JP, MLA |
| Minister for Fuel and Energy; Minister for Microeconomic Reform; Minister for Parliamentary and Electoral Reform; Minister assisting the Treasurer | Geoff Gallop, BEc, MA, MPhil, D.Phil. (Oxon), MLA |
| Minister for Aboriginal Affairs; Minister for Multicultural and Ethnic Affairs; Minister for Seniors (from 27 February 1991); Minister assisting the Minister for Women's Interests (until 7 September 1992); Minister for Women's Interests (from 7 September 1992) | Judyth Watson, Cert.Nurs.Ed., BSc (Hons), PhD, JP, MLA |
| Minister for Community Services (until 7 September 1992); Minister for Disability Services (from 20 August 1991) (from 7 September 1992:) Minister for the Family Minister for Community Development Minister for Youth Justice Leader of the House in the Legislative Assembly (from 26 October 1992)^{[2]} | Eric Ripper, BA, DipEd, MLA |
| Minister for the Environment (from 26 October 1992)^{[2]} Minister for Housing; Minister for Construction; Minister for Services (until 26 November 1992); Minister for Heritage | Jim McGinty, BA, BJuris, JP, MLA |
| Minister for Services; Minister for the Goldfields; Minister for the Mid-West | Tom Stephens, BA, MLC (from 26 November 1992)^{[3]} |
| Parliamentary Secretaries | (from 19 March 1991:) John Halden, MLC; Mark Nevill, BSc (Hons), MLC; Tom Stephens, BA, MLC |

^{2} On 20 October 1992, the six-volume Part One of the WA Inc Royal Commission was tabled in Parliament. A confidential appendix to the Director of Public Prosecutions concerned matters which may lead to prosecution. The following day, the Premier announced that Environment Minister Bob Pearce would stand down from the Ministry and vacate his seat at the next election. The ministry reduced to 15 members, with Jim McGinty assuming the Environment portfolio.
^{3} On 13 November 1992, Keith Wilson, the Minister for Health, resigned from the Ministry over a range of objections to the Government. Factional disputes over who should replace him resulted in a non-factional MLC, Tom Stephens, being selected ahead of the factions' preferred candidates, Nick Catania and Judy Edwards.

| Preceded by Dowding Ministry | Lawrence Ministry; 1990-1993 | Succeeded by Court–Cowan Ministry |
