= Dowding ministry =

The Dowding Ministry was the 30th Ministry of the Government of Western Australia, and was led by Labor Premier Peter Dowding and his deputy, David Parker. It succeeded the Burke Ministry on 25 February 1988, upon the retirement of Brian Burke from politics on the fifth anniversary of his becoming Premier.

The Ministry was reconstituted on 28 February 1989 following the 1989 election, due in part to the defeat of one minister, Barry Hodge (MLA for Melville), and the Parliamentary Secretary of the Cabinet, John Read (MLA for Mandurah), by opposition Liberal candidates.

The second term of the Ministry was a particularly difficult one due to ongoing revelations relating to the government's past dealings with relation to WA Inc, and with a federal election approaching, considerable pressure was being exerted on the State Government. On 7 February 1990, a majority of the 47-member Labor caucus signed an open letter calling on Dowding to step down, and in a caucus meeting on 12 February 1990, Dowding and Parker resigned. The Ministry was succeeded six days later by the Lawrence Ministry led by the Minister for Education and Aboriginal Affairs, Carmen Lawrence, and her deputy, Ian Taylor.

== Members ==
=== First Ministry ===
On 25 February 1988, the Governor, Gordon Reid, designated 17 principal executive offices of the Government under section 43(2) of the Constitution Acts Amendment Act 1899. The following ministers were then appointed to the positions, and served until the reconstitution of the Ministry on 28 February 1989.

The members of the First Dowding Ministry were:

Office	Minister
Premier and Treasurer; Minister for Productivity; Minister for Public Sector Management; Minister for Women's Interests	Peter Dowding, LL.B., MLA
Deputy Premier; Minister for Economic Development and Trade	David Parker, BA, JP, MLA
Attorney-General; Minister for Budget Management; Minister for Corrective Services; Leader of the Government in the Legislative Council	Joe Berinson, LL.B., QC, MLC
Minister for Community Services; Minister for the Family; Minister for Youth; Minister for the Aged; Minister assisting the Minister for Women's Interests; Deputy Leader of the Government in the Legislative Council	Kay Hallahan, BSW, JP, MLC
Minister for Mines; Minister for Local Government; Minister for Regional Development	Jeff Carr, BA, JP, MLA
Minister for Transport; Minister for Planning; Minister for Parliamentary and Electoral Reform; Minister for Intergovernmental Relations; Leader of the House in the Legislative Assembly	Bob Pearce, BA, DipEd, JP, MLA
Minister for the Environment; Minister for Conservation and Land Management; Minister for Waterways	Barry Hodge, MLA ^{[2]}
Minister for Agriculture; Minister for the South-West; Minister for Fisheries; Minister assisting the Minister for Economic Development and Trade ^{[1]}	Julian Grill, LL.B., JP, MLA
Minister for Health	Rev Keith Wilson, MLA
Minister for Police and Emergency Services; Minister assisting the Treasurer	Ian Taylor, B.Econ (Hons), JP, MLA
Minister for Housing; Minister for Tourism; Minister for Racing and Gaming	Pam Beggs, JP, MLA
Minister for Labour; Minister for Works and Services; Minister assisting the Minister for Productivity and Public Sector Management	Gavan Troy, B Bus, FAIM, JP, MLA
Minister for Water Resources; Minister for Small Business; Minister for the North-West; Minister for Aboriginal Affairs	Ernie Bridge, MLA
Minister for Employment and Training; Minister for Multicultural and Ethnic Affairs; Minister assisting the Minister of Education with TAFE	Gordon Hill, JP, MLA
Minister for Consumer Affairs; Minister for Sport and Recreation	Graham Edwards, MLC
Minister for Lands; Minister for the Arts	Yvonne Henderson, BA, DipEd, JP, MLA
Minister for Education	Carmen Lawrence, BPsych, PhD, MLA

^{1} On 7 June 1988, Julian Grill became, in addition to his earlier responsibilities, Minister assisting the Minister for Economic Development and Trade.
^{2} On 4 February 1989, Barry Hodge ceased to be a Member of the Legislative Assembly, having lost the seat of Melville, but continued to hold a position in the Ministry until a caucus meeting was held to reconstitute the Ministry.

=== Second Ministry ===
On 28 February 1989, the Governor, Gordon Reid, reconstituted the Ministry. He designated 17 principal executive offices of the Government and appointed the following ministers to the positions, who served until the Lawrence Ministry was established on 19 February 1990.

On 12 February 1990, Premier Peter Dowding resigned all of his ministerial portfolios, being replaced in them temporarily by Carmen Lawrence, who retained Education and Aboriginal Affairs. Deputy Premier David Parker resigned purely as Deputy Premier, retaining the Treasury, Resources Development and the Arts; Ian Taylor became Deputy Premier and retained Police and Emergency Services, Conservation and Land Management and Waterways.

The members of the Ministry were:

Office	Minister
Premier; Minister for Public Sector Management; Minister for Women's Interests	Peter Dowding, LL.B., MLA
Deputy Premier and Treasurer; Minister for Economic Development and Trade; Minister for the Arts	David Parker, BA, JP, MLA
Attorney-General; Minister for Budget Management; Minister for Corrective Services; Leader of the Government in the Legislative Council	Joe Berinson, LL.B., QC, MLC
Minister for Local Government; Minister for Lands; Minister for the Family; Minister for the Aged; Minister assisting the Minister for Women's Interests; Deputy Leader of the Government in the Legislative Council	Kay Hallahan, BSW, JP, MLC
Minister for Housing; Minister for Planning	Pam Beggs, JP, MLA
Minister for Agriculture; Minister for Water Resources; Minister for the North-West	Ernie Bridge, MLA
Minister for Mines; Minister for Fuel and Energy; Minister for the Mid-West	Jeff Carr, BA, JP, MLA
Minister for Racing and Gaming; Minister for Sport and Recreation; Minister for Youth	Graham Edwards, MLC
Minister for Economic Development and Trade; Minister for Tourism	Julian Grill, LL.B., JP, MLA
Minister for Consumer Affairs; Minister for Works and Services	Yvonne Henderson, BA, DipEd, JP, MLA
Minister for Regional Development; Minister for Fisheries; Minister for Multicultural and Ethnic Affairs	Gordon Hill, JP, MLA
Minister for Education; Minister for Aboriginal Affairs	Carmen Lawrence, BPsych, PhD, MLA
Minister for Transport; Minister for the Environment; Minister for Parliamentary and Electoral Reform; Leader of the House in the Legislative Assembly	Bob Pearce, BA, DipEd, JP, MLA
Minister for Community Services; Minister for Justice; Minister for the South-West	David Smith, LL.B., JP, MLA
Minister for Police and Emergency Services; Minister for Conservation and Land Management; Minister for Waterways	Ian Taylor, B.Econ (Hons), JP, MLA
Minister for Labour; Minister for Employment and Training; Minister for Productivity; Minister assisting the Minister of Education with TAFE	Gavan Troy, B Bus, FAIM, JP, MLA
Minister for Health	Rev Keith Wilson, MLA

Preceded by Burke Ministry	Dowding Ministry; 1988-1990	Succeeded by Lawrence Ministry
