= Burke ministry (Western Australia) =

The Burke Ministry was the 29th Ministry of the Government of Western Australia, led by Labor Premier Brian Burke and deputy Mal Bryce. It commenced on 25 February 1983, six days after the O'Connor ministry, led by Premier Ray O'Connor of the Liberal Party, was defeated at the 1983 election. It was followed by the Dowding Ministry upon Burke's retirement as Premier on 25 February 1988.

Most of its members followed on from the Burke shadow ministry which had functioned since September 1981.

== Overview ==
At first, the Burke Ministry utilised roles which were largely inherited from the previous Government. As the government had come to power at a time of economic recession, it commissioned a State Employment Task Force under the direction of Dr John Wood to review the machinery of government. An earlier report commissioned by the previous government on mining and resource development had highlighted interdepartmental conflicts in these areas. On the basis of these, a major reshuffle took place on 23 December with no changes of personnel, although several roles were abolished and new ones created, and Arthur Tonkin, who was said to have presented "too hardline an image" in his dealings with business, was relieved of Consumer Affairs. Another reshuffle occurred on 22 March 1985.

The Ministry was reconstituted on 26 February 1986 following the 1986 election, due in part to the defeat of one minister, Ken McIver (MLA for Avon), and the decisions of Ron Davies and David Evans to stand down. At this point, two honorary Ministers were appointed, including Ernie Bridge, to assist ministers in a number of portfolios. On 25 July 1986, they were both promoted to full Ministers, making Bridge the first ever Aboriginal Cabinet minister in Australia.

== First Ministry ==
On 25 February 1983, the Governor, Sir Richard Trowbridge, designated 15 principal executive offices of the Government under section 43(2) of the Constitution Acts Amendment Act 1899. The following ministers were then appointed to the positions, and served until the reconstitution of the Ministry on 26 February 1986.

The list below is ordered by decreasing seniority within the Cabinet, as indicated by the Government Gazette and the Hansard index.

Office	Minister
Premier and Treasurer; Minister Co-ordinating Economic and Social Development; Minister for Forests (until 22 March 1985); Minister for Tourism (until 22 March 1985); Minister for Women's Interests	Brian Burke, MLA
Deputy Premier; Minister for Economic Development and Technology (until 23 Dec 1983) (from 23 December 1983:) Minister for Industrial Development Minister for Technology Minister for Defence Liaison (from 22 March 1985:) Minister for Communication Minister for Small Business	Mal Bryce, BA, MLA
Minister for Industrial Relations (until 22 March 1985); Minister for Administrative Services (23 Dec 1983 – 22 March 1985); Minister for Tourism (from 22 March 1985); Minister for Racing and Gaming (from 22 March 1985); Leader of the Government in the Legislative Council	Des Dans, MLC
Attorney-General; Minister for Budget Management (from 23 December 1983); Minister for Prisons (from 22 April 1983)^{[2]} Chief Secretary (until 22 April 1983)^{[2]} (until 23 December 1983:) Minister for Inter-Governmental Relations Minister for Defence Liaison Minister assisting the Treasrer	Joe Berinson, LL.B., MLC
Minister for Water Resources; Minister for Consumer Affairs (until 23 December 1983); Minister for Parliamentary and Electoral Reform; Leader of the House in the Legislative Assembly	Arthur Tonkin, BA, DipEd, MLA
Minister for Police and Emergency Services; Minister for Local Government	Jeff Carr, BA, MLA
Minister for the Environment; Minister for Conservation and Land Management (from 22 March 1985); Minister for Multicultural and Ethnic Affairs; Minister for the Arts	Ron Davies, MLA
Minister for Agriculture; Minister for Fisheries and Wildlife; Minister assisting the Minister for Forests (25 March 1983^{[1]}–22 March 1985); Minister assisting the Minister for Conservation and Land Management (from 22 March 1985)	David Evans, BA, MLA
Minister for Education; Minister for Planning (from 22 March 1985)	Bob Pearce, BA, DipEd, MLA
Minister for Health	Barry Hodge, MLA
Minister for Works; Minister for Lands and Surveys	Ken McIver, MLA
Minister for Employment^{[3]} (until 23 December 1983); Minister for Planning and Administrative Services (until 23 December 1983)^{[3]} Minister for Minerals and Energy (from 23 December 1983); Minister assisting the Minister Co-ordinating; Economic and Social Development	David Parker, BA, MLA
Minister for Transport; Minister for Regional Development; Minister for the North-West; Minister with special responsibility for "Bunbury 2000"	Julian Grill, LL.B., MLA
Minister for Housing; Minister for Youth and Community Services (until 22 March 1985) (from 22 March 1985:) Minister for Youth Affairs Minister for the Aged Minister for Community Services Minister for Aboriginal Affairs; Minister for Sport and Recreation	Rev Keith Wilson, MLA
(until 23 December 1983:) Minister for Mines Minister for Fuel and Energy (from 23 December 1983:) Minister for Planning (until 22 March 1985) Minister for Employment and Training Minister for Consumer Affairs Minister for Industrial Relations (from 22 March 1985)	Peter Dowding, LL.B., MLA

^{1} On 25 March 1983, David Evans became, in addition to his earlier responsibilities, Minister assisting the Minister for Forests.
^{2} On 22 April 1983, Joe Berinson's responsibilities were amended. The historic position of Chief Secretary was abolished, with those responsibilities passing to the Minister of Planning and Administrative Services. Berinson, meanwhile, added Minister for Prisons to his earlier responsibilities.
^{3} On 3 June 1983, David Parker's responsibilities were amended, with Planning and Administrative Services becoming Planning, and Employment becoming Employment and Administrative Services.

== Second Ministry ==
On 26 February 1986, the Governor, Gordon Reid, appointed the new Ministry. He designated 15 principal executive offices of the Government and appointed the following ministers to the positions, who served until the Dowding Ministry was established on 26 February 1988. Three of the members were new to the Ministry, and two additional honorary members were also appointed to assist specific Ministers. One of these was Australia's first ever Aboriginal Cabinet minister, Ernie Bridge. These honorary ministers were elevated to ministerial posts following the assent of the Constitution Amendment Act 1986 (No.10 of 1986) on 22 July 1986, which officially grew the Ministry from 15 to 17 members.

The members of the Second Ministry were:

Office	Minister
Premier and Treasurer; Minister Co-ordinating Economic and Social Development (until 16 March 1987); Minister for Public Sector Management (from 29 October 1986); Minister for Women's Interests	Brian Burke, JP, MLA
Deputy Premier; Minister for Industry and Technology; Minister for Small Business (until 12 May 1986); Minister for Defence Liaison; Minister for Communications; Minister for Parliamentary and Electoral Reform	Mal Bryce, BA, JP, MLA
Minister for Works and Services; Minister for Water Resources (12 May–25 July 1986); Minister with special responsibility for the America's Cup; Leader of the Government in the Legislative Council	Des Dans, MLC (until 16 March 1987)^{[6]}
Attorney-General; Minister for Budget Management; Minister for Prisons (until 16 March 1987); Minister for Corrective Services (from 16 March 1987); Deputy Leader of the Government in the Legislative Council (Leader from 16 March 1987)	Joe Berinson, LL.B., MLC
Minister for Police and Emergency Services; Minister for Water Resources	Arthur Tonkin, BA, DipEd, JP, MLA (until 12 May 1986)^{[4]}
Minister for Local Government; Minister for Regional Development	Jeff Carr, BA, JP, MLA
Minister for Education; Minister for Planning; Minister for Intergovernmental Relations (from 16 March 1987); Minister for Police and Emergency Services (12 May–25 July 1986); Leader of the House in the Legislative Assembly	Bob Pearce, BA, DipEd, JP, MLA
Minister for the Environment; Minister for Conservation and Land Management	Barry Hodge, MLA
Minister for Minerals and Energy; Minister for Economic Development (from 16 March 1987); Minister for the Arts; Minister assisting the Minister Co-ordinating; Economic and Social Development (until 16 March 1987)	David Parker, BA, MLA
Minister for Agriculture; Minister for Fisheries; Minister for the South-West; Minister for Transport (12 May–25 July 1986); Minister for the North-West (until 25 July 1986)	Julian Grill, LL.B., JP, MLA
Minister for Housing; Minister for Lands (from 16 March 1987); Minister for Sport and Recreation (until 16 March 1987); Minister for Consumer Affairs (until 16 March 1987); Minister for Aboriginal Affairs (until 25 July 1986)	Rev Keith Wilson, MLA
(Until 16 March 1987:) Minister for Employment and Training Minister for Industrial Relations (from 16 March 1987:) Minister for Works and Services Minister for Labour Minister for Productivity and Employment Minister assisting the Treasurer Minister assisting the Minister for Public Sector Management (from 29 October 1986)	Peter Dowding, LL.B., MLA
Minister for Health; Minister for Consumer Affairs (from 16 March 1987); Minister for the Aged (until 12 May 1986); Minister for Lands (until 16 March 1987); Minister assisting the Minister for Economic Development (from 16 March 1987)	Ian Taylor, B.Econ (Hons), JP, MLA
Minister for Tourism; Minister for Racing and Gaming	Pam Beggs, JP, MLA
Minister for Community Services; Minister for the Family; Minister for Youth; Minister for the Aged (from 12 May 1986); Minister for Multicultural and Ethnic Affairs (until 25 July 1986); Minister assisting the Minister for Women's Interests; Deputy Leader of the Government in the Legislative Council (from 16 March 1987)	Kay Hallahan, BSW, JP, MLC ^{[6]}
Honorary Minister assisting the Ministers for Transport and Small Business (until 12 May 1986) (from 12 May 1986:) Minister for Transport Minister for Small Business	Gavan Troy, B Bus, AFAIM, JP, MLA^{[4]}
(Until 25 July 1986:) Honorary Minister assisting the Ministers for Water Resources, The North West and Aboriginal Affairs (From 25 July 1986:) Minister for Water Resources Minister for the North-West Minister for Aboriginal Affairs	Ernie Bridge, MLA^{[5]}
(12 May-25 July 1986:) Honorary Minister assisting the Ministers for Police and Emergency Services and Multicultural and Ethnic Affairs (From 25 July 1986:) Minister for Police and Emergency Services Minister for Multicultural and Ethnic Affairs	Gordon Hill, JP, MLA (from 12 May 1986)^{[4]}^{[5]}
Minister for Sport and Recreation	Graham Edwards, MLC (from 16 March 1987)^{[6]}

^{4} On 12 May 1986, Arthur Tonkin, the minister for Police and Emergency Services and Water Resources, resigned from the Ministry. In the resulting reshuffle, Gavan Troy, previously an Honorary Minister, was appointed to the Ministry, whilst Gordon Hill was made an honorary minister.
^{5} On 25 July 1986, the Ministry was officially expanded to 17, with the two Honorary Ministers assuming the portfolios they had previously assisted.
^{6} On 16 March 1987, Des Dans resigned from the Ministry, and fellow MLC Graham Edwards was appointed in his place. Kay Hallahan was promoted in seniority from 14th to 4th within the Cabinet.

Preceded by O'Connor Ministry	Burke Ministry; 1983-1988	Succeeded by Dowding Ministry
