= 1990 Western Australian Labor Party leadership spill =

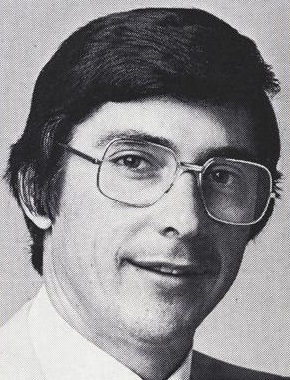
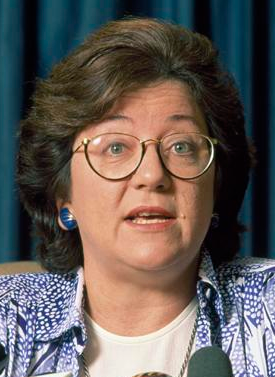
Peter Dowding and Carmen Lawrence

A leadership spill of the Western Australian Labor Party occurred on 12 February 1990. It resulted in the replacement of premier and party leader Peter Dowding with Carmen Lawrence, making her the first female state premier in Australia. It also resulted in the replacement of deputy premier and deputy party leader David Parker with Ian Taylor. The leadership spill occurred as a result of the government's increasing unpopularity as a result of the WA Inc scandal.

== Background ==
The premier of Western Australia, Brian Burke, who had been in power since 1983, was replaced by Peter Dowding in February 1988 in an amicable transition. At the same time, David Parker replaced Mal Bryce as deputy premier. The Labor Party narrowly won the February 1989 Western Australian state election. Since then, the Labor Government had been growing increasingly unpopular as a result of the WA Inc controversy, in which hundreds of millions of dollars of taxpayer money was wasted through the government's close involvement with businesses.

During the District Court trial of Western Colleries Limited (Note: Western Colleries Limited was a subsidiary of Rothwells, a company at the centre of WA Inc.) director Tony Lloyd, his defence lawyers argued that Premier Dowding and Acting Energy Minister Julian Grill had ordered Lloyd to pay off a Rothwells debt using a $15 million cheque. In January 1990, Lloyd was found guilty of acting improperly, making him the first person convicted for an offence relating to WA Inc. (Note: Tony Lloyd was cleared of acting improperly in the court of appeal in May 1990.) This made the Dowding Labor Government even more unpopular, with opinion polls showing support was as low as 32%. Dowding's popularity was also hurt by his arrogant attitude, which annoyed colleagues.

Additionally, the 1990 Australian federal election was coming up, and the Federal Labor Party under Bob Hawke wanted to limit the seats lost by the party in Western Australia. Having a state leader less associated with WA Inc would have helped with that.

== Leadership spill ==
State Secretary Stephen Smith, FMWU Secretary Jim McGinty, and seven Labor politicians – Carmen Lawrence, David Parker, Ian Taylor, Kay Hallahan, Keith Wilson, Geoff Gallop and Pam Beggs – met together to discuss Peter Dowding's leadership. They decided that he should be forced out of the leadership. By 7 February 1990, the majority of the 47 members of the Labor caucus had signed a letter calling for Dowding's resignation. Minister for Education and Aboriginal Affairs Carmen Lawrence and Minister for Police and Emergency Services, Conservation and Land Management, and Waterways Ian Taylor were seen as most likely to win the leadership, with Lawrence having a slight edge over Taylor.

On 8 February 1990, Dowding returned early from the World Economic Forum in Switzerland in order to shore up his leadership, spending the next few days speaking to party members in an attempt to ensure their support. He also held a cabinet meeting on 9 February.

At a caucus meeting on 12 February, Dowding and his deputy, David Parker, resigned from their positions. Lawrence was elected as the leader of the Labor Party, making her the first female premier in Australia. (Note: But not the first female head of government, as Rosemary Follett was the chief minister of the Australian Capital Territory in 1989.) Taylor was elected as the deputy leader of the party, making him the deputy premier of Western Australia. Both were elected unopposed. Lawrence was seen as a good candidate as she had little association with WA Inc. Dowding criticised the leadership challenge, saying that the timing was premature and was done to help Labor win the federal election, rather than for what's good for the state.

== Aftermath ==
Parker remained in cabinet, serving as the minister for resources, trade and the arts. He resigned from parliament on 26 April 1990. Dowding was on the backbench until his resignation from parliament on 26 April 1990. Grill was put on the backbench as well. An opinion poll showed that support for the federal Labor Party in Western Australia increased following the leadership change. The poll also showed that WA Inc would influence the decision of 56% of Labor voters, down from 65% the previous week. At the federal election held in March 1990, the Labor Party only lost one seat in Western Australia.

At the 1993 state election, the Lawrence Labor Government was defeated by Richard Court's Coalition. The swing against Labor was less than expected however, at 2.9%.

== See also ==
- 1990 Maylands state by-election – Election to replace Peter Dowding in parliament
- 1990 Fremantle state by-election – Election to replace David Parker in parliament
