= Burke shadow ministry =

Shadow cabinet of Western Australia

The Burke shadow ministry was a Shadow Cabinet led by the Opposition Leader and leader of the Labor Party, Brian Burke, in the Parliament of Western Australia. While serving no formal status—only the Leader and Deputy Leader received remuneration for their role over and above that of a Member of Parliament—it was intended to improve the effectiveness of the Opposition by providing an alternative Ministry to voters, consisting of shadow ministers who could ask role-specific questions in parliament, provide comment to the media and offer alternative policies to the government in their areas of responsibility.

The Burke shadow ministry existed from September 1981, after Burke's party-room defeat of then leader Ron Davies, until the 1983 state election at which Labor entered government and formed the Burke Ministry.

The governing Ministries at the time were the Court Ministry and the O'Connor Ministry.

== The Shadow Ministry ==
The following members of Parliament were members of the shadow ministry:

Office	Shadow Minister
Leader of the Opposition; Shadow Treasurer; Shadow Minister for Immigration; Shadow Minister for Ethnic Affairs; Shadow Minister for Economic Affairs; Shadow Minister for Federal Affairs; Shadow Minister for Aboriginal Affairs	Brian Burke, MLA
Deputy Leader Shadow Minister for Industrial and Resource Development; Shadow Minister for Technology	Mal Bryce, BA, MLA
Leader of the Opposition in the Legislative Council; Shadow Minister for Industrial Relations and Employment	Des Dans, MLC
Shadow Attorney-General	Joe Berinson, LL.B., MLC
Shadow Minister for Local Government; Shadow Minister for Regional Development and Decentralisation; Shadow Minister for Consumer Affairs	Arthur Tonkin, BA, DipEd, MLA
Shadow Minister for Police; Shadow Minister for Traffic Safety	Jeff Carr, BA, MLA
Shadow Minister for Urban Development and Planning; Shadow Minister for Cultural Affairs	Ron Davies, MLA
Shadow Minister for Agriculture; Shadow Minister for Lands Shadow Minister for Forests	David Evans, BA, MLA
Shadow Minister for Education; Shadow Minister for Women's Interests	Bob Pearce, BA, DipEd, MLA
Shadow Minister for Health	Barry Hodge, MLA
Shadow Minister for Conservation and the Environment; Shadow Minister for Fisheries and Wildlife	Mike Barnett, MLA
Shadow Minister for Transport; Shadow Minister for Tourism	Ken McIver, MLA
Shadow Chief Secretary; Shadow Minister for Public Works; Shadow Minister for Water Resources; Shadow Minister for Parliamentary and Electoral Reform	David Parker, BA, MLA
Shadow Minister for Mines; Shadow Minister for Fuel and Energy	Julian Grill, LL.B., MLA
Shadow Minister for Housing; Shadow Minister for Community Welfare; Shadow Minister for Recreation	Rev Keith Wilson, MLA
