= Court–Cowan ministry =

The Court–Cowan Ministry was the 32nd Ministry of the Government of Western Australia, and was led by Liberal Premier Richard Court and his deputy, the Nationals' Hendy Cowan. It succeeded the Lawrence Ministry on 16 February 1993, following the defeat of the Labor government at the 1993 election ten days earlier. The Ministry was reconstituted on 9 January 1997 following the December 1996 election, due in part to the retirement and resignation of several ministers—Richard Lewis, Kevin Minson, Roger Nicholls and Bob Wiese. The ministry was followed by the Gallop Ministry on 16 February 2001 after the Coalition lost government at the state election held on 16 February.

== First Ministry ==
On 16 February 1993, the Governor, Sir Francis Burt, designated 17 principal executive offices of the Government under section 43(2) of the Constitution Acts Amendment Act 1899. The following ministers were then appointed to the positions, and served until the reconstitution of the Ministry on 10 February 1995.

The list below is ordered by decreasing seniority within the Cabinet, as indicated by the Government Gazette and the Hansard index. Blue entries indicate members of the Liberal Party, whilst green entries indicate members of the National Party.

| Office | Minister |
|---|---|
| Premier and Treasurer; Minister for Public Sector Management; Minister for Federal Affairs; Minister for Tourism (from 25 January 1994)^{[2]} | Richard Court, BComm, MLA |
| Deputy Premier; Minister for Commerce and Trade | Hendy Cowan, MLA |
| Minister for Resources Development; Minister for Energy; Minister for Tourism (25 August 1993^{[1]}–25 January 1994^{[2]}); Leader of the House in the Legislative Assembly | Colin Barnett, MEc, MLA |
| Minister for Primary Industry; Minister for Fisheries | Monty House, JP, MLA |
| Minister for Mines; Minister for Lands; Minister assisting the Minister for Public Sector Management (from 25 January 1994); Minister assisting the Minister for Resources Development; Leader of the Government in the Legislative Council | George Cash, JP, MLC |
| Minister for Transport | Eric Charlton, MLC |
| Minister for Education; Minister for Employment and Training; Minister for Sport and Recreation (from 25 August 1993)^{[1]} Minister assisting the Minister for Commerce and Trade | Norman Moore, BA, DipEd, MLC |
| Attorney-General; Minister for Women's Interests; Minister for Parliamentary and Electoral Affairs; Minister assisting the Minister for Community Development with special responsibility for the Youth Justice Bureau (8 March 1993 – 1 March 1994) | Cheryl Edwardes, B.Juris, LL.B., BA, MLA |
| Minister for Finance; Minister for Racing and Gaming; Minister assisting the Treasurer | Max Evans, MBE, FCA, MLC |
| Minister for Tourism; Minister for Housing; Minister for Sport and Recreation | Doug Shave, MLA (until 24 August 1993)^{[1]} |
| Minister for Water Resources; Minister for Local Government | Paul Omodei, MLA |
| Minister for Health; Minister for the Arts; Minister for Consumer Affairs (until 3 November 1993); Minister for Fair Trading (from 3 November 1993) | Peter Foss, BA, LL.B., MLC |
| Minister for the Environment; Minister for Disability Services; Minister for Aboriginal Affairs (until 25 January 1994); Minister assisting the Minister for Fisheries | Kevin Minson, BDSc, MLA |
| Minister for Community Development; Minister for the Family; Minister for Seniors | Roger Nicholls, MLA |
| Minister for Labour Relations; Minister for Works; Minister for Services; Minister for Multicultural and Ethnic Affairs | Graham Kierath, MLA |
| Minister for Police; Minister for Emergency Services | Bob Wiese, MLA |
| Minister for Planning; Minister for Heritage; Minister for Housing (25 August 1993^{[1]}–25 January 1994^{[2]}); Minister assisting the Minister for Transport | Richard Lewis, MLA |
| Minister for Aboriginal Affairs; Minister for Housing | Kevin Prince, LL.B., MLA (from 25 January 1994)^{[2]} |
| Parliamentary Secretaries | Bob Pike, MLC^{[3]} Fred Tubby, BEd, MACE, JP, MLA; Bill McNee, MLA |

^{X} Both the First and Second Ministries were officially referred to as the "Court–Cowan Ministry" or "Court Ministry" in Hansard and other parliamentary records.
^{1} On 24 August 1993, Doug Shave resigned for personal reasons. His three portfolios were distributed to three of the other ministers.
^{2} On 25 January 1994, the ministry returned to 17 members with the appointment of Kevin Prince. Additionally, the Premier took on the role of Minister for Tourism.
^{3} On 26 April 1994, parliamentary secretary Bob Pike died. His parliamentary secretary position was not refilled.

== First Ministry (reconstituted) ==
A reshuffle on 10 February 1995 saw several changes in order and portfolios, but no changes of personnel. The Governor, Major-General Michael Jeffery, designated 17 principal executive offices of the Government under section 43(2) of the Constitution Acts Amendment Act 1899. The following ministers were then appointed to the positions, and served until the reconstitution of the Ministry on 9 January 1997.

Blue entries indicate members of the Liberal Party, whilst green entries indicate members of the National Party.

| Office | Minister |
|---|---|
| Premier and Treasurer; Minister for Public Sector Management; Minister for Federal Affairs; Minister for Tourism (until 21 December 1995); Minister for Youth (from 3 April 1996) | Richard Court, BComm, MLA |
| Deputy Premier; Minister for Commerce and Trade; Minister for Regional Development; Minister for Small Business | Hendy Cowan, MLA |
| Minister for Resources Development; Minister for Energy; Minister for Education (from 21 December 1995); Leader of the House in the Legislative Assembly | Colin Barnett, MEc, MLA |
| Minister for Primary Industry; Minister for Fisheries | Monty House, JP, MLA |
| Minister for Mines; Minister for Lands; Minister assisting the Minister for Public Sector Management; Leader of the Government in the Legislative Council | George Cash, JP, MLC (until 26 April 1996)^{[5]} |
| Minister for Transport | Eric Charlton, MLC |
| Minister for Education (until 21 December 1995); Minister for Employment and Training; Minister for Tourism (from 21 December 1995); Minister for Sport and Recreation; Minister for Parliamentary and Electoral Affairs; Leader of the Government in the Legislative Council (from 30 April 1996)^{[5]} | Norman Moore, BA, DipEd, MLC |
| (until 21 December 1995:) Attorney-General Minister for Justice (from 21 December 1995:) Minister for Family and Children's Services Minister for Youth (until 3 April 1996) Minister for Seniors Minister for Fair Trading Minister for Women's Interests | Cheryl Edwardes, B.Juris, LL.B., BA, MLA |
| Minister for Finance; Minister for Racing and Gaming; Minister assisting the Treasurer | Max Evans, MBE, FCA, MLC |
| Minister for the Environment; Minister for the Arts (from 21 December 1995:) Attorney-General Minister for Justice (until 21 December 1995:) Minister for Water Resources Minister for Fair Trading | Peter Foss, BA, LL.B., MLC |
| Minister for Health (until 21 December 1995); Minister for Labour Relations; Minister for Lands (from 26 April 1996)^{[5]} Minister for Housing (from 21 December 1995) | Graham Kierath, MLA |
| (until 29 June 1995:) Minister for Community Development Minister for the Family Minister for Seniors (29 June–21 December 1995) Minister for Family and Children's Services Minister for Youth (until 3 April 1996) Minister for Seniors Minister for Water Resources (from 21 December 1995) | Roger Nicholls, MLA |
| Minister for Mines (from 26 April 1996)^{[5]} Minister for Works; Minister for Services; Minister for Disability Services; Minister assisting the Minister for Justice | Kevin Minson, BDSc, MLA |
| Minister for Planning; Minister for Heritage | Richard Lewis, MLA |
| Minister for Police; Minister for Emergency Services | Bob Wiese, MLA |
| Minister for Local Government; Minister for Multicultural and Ethnic Affairs | Paul Omodei, MLA |
| Minister for Health (from 21 December 1995); Minister for Aboriginal Affairs; Minister for Housing (until 21 December 1995) | Kevin Prince, LL.B., MLA |
| Parliamentary Secretaries | Bill McNee, MLA; Fred Tubby, BEd, MACE, JP, MLA; Doug Shave, MLA; Rhonda Parker, DipTeach, MLA |

^{4} On 21 December 1995, a major reshuffle took place amongst existing Ministers, mainly to discharge particular Ministers of portfolios which had proven troublesome for the government.
^{5} On 26 April 1996, George Cash resigned from the ministry due to ill health. Graham Kierath and Kevin Minson adopted his portfolios, whilst Norman Moore was elected leader of the Government in the Legislative Council four days later.

== Second Ministry ==
On 9 January 1997, the Governor, Major General Michael Jeffery, designated 17 principal executive offices of the Government under section 43(2) of the Constitution Acts Amendment Act 1899. The following ministers were then appointed to the positions, and served until the reconstitution of the Ministry on 22 December 1999.

| Office | Minister |
|---|---|
| Premier and Treasurer; Minister for Public Sector Management; Minister for Federal Affairs | Richard Court, BComm, MLA |
| Deputy Premier; Minister for Commerce and Trade; Minister for Regional Development; Minister for Small Business | Hendy Cowan, MLA |
| Minister for Resources Development; Minister for Energy; Minister for Education; Leader of the House in the Legislative Assembly | Colin Barnett, MEc, MLA |
| Minister for Primary Industry; Minister for Fisheries | Monty House, JP, MLA |
| Minister for Mines; Minister for Tourism; Minister for Sport and Recreation; Leader of the Government in the Legislative Council | Norman Moore, BA, DipEd, MLC |
| Minister for Transport | Eric Charlton, MLC (until 28 July 1998); Murray Criddle, MLC (from 28 July 1998)^{[1]} |
| Minister for the Environment; Minister for Labour Relations (from 28 July 1998); Minister for Employment and Training (until 28 July 1998) | Cheryl Edwardes, B.Juris, LL.B., BA, MLA |
| Minister for Labour Relations (until 28 July 1998)^{[1]} Minister for Employment and Training (from 28 July 1998); Minister for Planning; Minister for Heritage | Graham Kierath, MLA |
| Attorney-General; Minister for Justice; Minister for the Arts | Peter Foss, BA, LL.B., QC, MLC |
| Minister for Finance; Minister for Racing and Gaming | Max Evans, MBE, FCA, MLC |
| Minister for Health (until 28 July 1998); Minister for Police (from 28 July 1998); Minister for Emergency Services (from 28 July 1998) | Kevin Prince, LL.B., MLA |
| Minister for Lands; Minister for Fair Trading; Minister for Parliamentary and Electoral Affairs | Doug Shave, MLA |
| Minister for Local Government; Minister for Disability Services | Paul Omodei, MLA |
| Minister for Family and Children's Services; Minister for Seniors; Minister for Women's Interests | Rhonda Parker, DipTeach, MLA |
| Minister for Housing; Minister for Aboriginal Affairs; Minister for Water Resources | Kim Hames, MBBS, JP, MLA |
| Minister for Health (from 28 July 1998); Minister for Police (until 28 July 1998); Minister for Emergency Services (until 28 July 1998) | John Day, BSc, BDSc, MLA |
| Minister for Works; Minister for Services; Minister for Multicultural and Ethnic Affairs (until 11 August 1998); Minister for Citizenship and Multicultural Interests (from 11 August 1998); Minister for Youth | Mike Board, JP, MLA |
| Parliamentary Secretaries | Fred Tubby, BEd, MACE, JP, MLA; John Bradshaw, MPS, JP, MLA; June van de Klashorst, MLA; Arthur Marshall, MLA |

^{1} On 28 July 1998, a reshuffle took place following Eric Charlton's departure from Parliament, with Agricultural MLC Murray Criddle assuming his Transport portfolio. Graham Kierath lost his Labour Relations portfolio to Cheryl Edwardes, whilst Kevin Prince and John Day traded portfolios.

== Second Ministry (reconstituted) ==
On 22 December 1999, following a reshuffle which lost Ministers Max Evans and Rhonda Parker, the Governor, Major General Michael Jeffery, designated 17 principal executive offices of the Government under section 43(2) of the Constitution Acts Amendment Act 1899. The following ministers were then appointed to the positions, and served until the end of the Ministry on 16 February 2001, when they were replaced by the Gallop Ministry.

| Office | Minister |
|---|---|
| Premier and Treasurer; Minister for Public Sector Management; Minister for Federal Affairs | Richard Court, BComm, MLA |
| Deputy Premier; Minister for Commerce and Trade; Minister for Regional Development; Minister for Small Business | Hendy Cowan, MLA |
| Minister for Resources Development; Minister for Energy; Minister for Education; Leader of the House in the Legislative Assembly | Colin Barnett, MEc, MLA |
| Minister for Primary Industry; Minister for Fisheries | Monty House, JP, MLA |
| Minister for Mines; Minister for Tourism; Minister for Sport and Recreation; Minister for Racing and Gaming; Leader of the Government in the Legislative Council | Norman Moore, BA, DipEd, MLC |
| Minister for Transport | Murray Criddle, MLC |
| Minister for the Environment; Minister for Labour Relations | Cheryl Edwardes, B.Juris, LL.B., BA, MLA |
| Minister for Lands; Minister for Fair Trading; Minister for Parliamentary and Electoral Affairs | Doug Shave, MLA |
| Minister for Police; Minister for Emergency Services | Kevin Prince, LL.B., MLA |
| Minister for Planning; Minister for Heritage; Minister assisting the Treasurer | Graham Kierath, MLA |
| Attorney-General; Minister for Justice | Peter Foss, BA, LL.B., QC, MLC |
| Minister for Housing; Minister for Aboriginal Affairs; Minister for Water Resources | Kim Hames, MBBS, JP, MLA |
| Minister for Health | John Day, BSc, BDSc, MLA |
| Minister for Employment and Training; Minister for Youth; Minister for the Arts | Mike Board, JP, MLA |
| Minister for Local Government; Minister for Disability Services; Minister for Forest Products | Paul Omodei, MLA |
| Minister for Family and Children's Services; Minister for Seniors; Minister for Women's Interests | June van de Klashorst, MLA |
| Minister for Works; Minister for Services; Minister for Citizenship and Multicultural Interests | Rob Johnson, MLA |
| Parliamentary Secretaries | John Bradshaw, MPS, JP, MLA; Arthur Marshall, MLA; Katie Hodson-Thomas, JP, MLA; Barry House, BEcon, JP, MLC; Dan Barron-Sullivan, MLA |

| Preceded by Lawrence Ministry | Court–Cowan Ministry; 1993–2001 | Succeeded by Gallop Ministry |
