= Jeff Carr (Australian politician) =

Australian politician (born 1944)

The Honourable Jeff Carr

Member of the Legislative Assembly of Western Australia
- In office 30 March 1974 – 28 February 1991
- Preceded by: Bill Sewell
- Succeeded by: Bob Bloffwitch
- Constituency: Geraldton

Personal details
- Born: 29 April 1944 (age 82) Geraldton, Western Australia
- Party: Labor
- Education: University of Western Australia

Jeffrey Phillip Carr (born 29 April 1944) is an Australian former politician who was a Labor Party member of the Legislative Assembly of Western Australia from 1974 to 1991, representing the seat of Geraldton. He served as a minister in the governments of Brian Burke, Peter Dowding, and Carmen Lawrence.

Carr was born in Geraldton, and attended Geraldton High School. He subsequently trained as a schoolteacher, attending Claremont Teachers College and the University of Western Australia. A member of the Labor Party from 1969, Carr stood for parliament at the 1974 state election, replacing the retiring Bill Sewell as the member for Geraldton. After the 1977 election, he became a member of the shadow ministry of Colin Jamieson. He remained a shadow minister under Ron Davies and Brian Burke during their periods as Leader of the Opposition, and following Labor's victory at the 1983 election was made Minister for Local Government and Minister for Police and Emergency Services in the Burke government.

Carr was nearly defeated at the 1986 election, seeing his margin plunge from a comfortably safe 63.1 percent to an extremely marginal 50.4 percent. Carr was replaced as Minister for Police and Emergency Services by Arthur Tonkin, but remained in cabinet as Minister for Regional Development. He kept his ministerial titles following the retirement of Brian Burke in February 1988, and was also made Minister for Mines in the new Dowding ministry. Following a reshuffle in 1989, Carr lost his previous positions and was instead made Minister for Fuel and Energy and Minister for the Mid-West, the latter being an entirely new creation. He retained those when Carmen Lawrence replaced Peter Dowding as premier in February 1990, and was also made Minister for Small Business. In February 1991, Carr and two others (Pam Buchanan and Gavan Troy) were removed from the ministry by a Labor caucus vote. He announced his resignation from parliament within a few days, and the resulting by-election was won by the Liberal candidate, Bob Bloffwitch.

Parliament of Western Australia
Preceded by Bill Sewell	Member for Geraldton; 1974–1991	Succeeded by Bob Bloffwitch
Political offices
Preceded by June Craig	Minister for Local Government; 1983–1989	Succeeded by Kay Hallahan
Preceded by Ian Medcalf	Minister for Police and Emergency Services; 1983–1986	Succeeded by Arthur Tonkin
Preceded by Julian Grill	Minister for Regional Development; 1986–1989	Succeeded by Gordon Hill
Preceded by David Parker	Minister for Mines; 1988–1991	Succeeded by Gordon Hill
Preceded by David Parker	Minister for Fuel and Energy; 1989–1991	Succeeded by Geoff Gallop
New creation	Minister for the Mid-West; 1989–1991	Succeeded by Gordon Hill
Preceded by Ernie Bridge	Minister for Small Business; 1990–1991	Abolished
