= David Smith (Western Australian politician) =

Australian politician (1943–2026)

The Honourable David Smith OAM

Member of the Legislative Assembly of Western Australia
- In office 19 February 1983 – 14 December 1996
- Preceded by: None (new creation)
- Succeeded by: Dan Sullivan
- Constituency: Mitchell

Personal details
- Born: 12 October 1943 Bunbury, Western Australia, Australia
- Died: 16 April 2026 (aged 82)
- Party: Labor
- Education: University of Western Australia

David Lawrence Smith OAM (12 October 1943 – 16 April 2026) was an Australian politician who was a Labor Party member of the Legislative Assembly of Western Australia from 1983 to 1996. He served as a minister in the governments of Peter Dowding and Carmen Lawrence.

== Early life and career ==
Smith was born in Bunbury, Western Australia. He attended Marist Brothers' St Francis Xavier's boys school in Bunbury and St Ildephonsus college in New Norcia. After graduating from high school he studied law at the University of Western Australia. A member of the Labor Party since 1967, he contested the seat of Bunbury at the 1977 state election, but lost to the sitting Liberal member, John Sibson. Smith served on the City of Bunbury council from 1979 to 1983, before being elected to the seat of Mitchell at the 1983 state election. After the 1989 election, he was appointed to the Dowding ministry as Minister for Justice, Minister for Community Services, and Minister for the South-West. Smith was retained in the ministry when Carmen Lawrence succeeded Peter Dowding as premier in February 1990, with the same titles. Following a reshuffle in February 1991, he was replaced as Minister for Community Services by Eric Ripper, but was additionally made Minister for Lands, Minister for Planning, and Minister for Local Government. Smith lost his ministerial titles after Labor's defeat at the 1993 election, but remained in parliament until his retirement at the 1996 election. Between 2005 and 2013, he was the mayor of Bunbury. In 2023, Smith was honoured as a freeman of the City of Bunbury.

== Personal life and death ==
Smith's mother was Evelyn Smith, who was renowned for her special relationship with local dolphins. He was married to Tresslyn Smith, a councillor with the City of Bunbury and Deputy Mayor. Smith had three children. He was a Catholic.

Smith died on 16 April 2026, at the age of 82.

Parliament of Western Australia
New creation	Member for Mitchell; 1983–1996	Succeeded by Dan Sullivan
Political offices
New creation	Minister for Justice; 1989–1993	Succeeded by Cheryl Edwardes
Preceded by Kay Hallahan	Minister for Community Services; 1989–1991	Succeeded by Eric Ripper
Preceded by Julian Grill	Minister for the South-West; 1989–1993	Abolished
Preceded by Kay Hallahan	Minister for Lands; 1991–1993	Succeeded by George Cash
Preceded by Pam Beggs	Minister for Planning; 1991–1993	Succeeded by Richard Lewis
Preceded by Kay Hallahan	Minister for Local Government; 1991–1993	Succeeded by Paul Omodei
