= Gordon Hill (politician) =

Australian politician (born 1951)

The Honourable Gordon Hill

Member of the Legislative Assembly of Western Australia
- In office 13 March 1982 – 19 February 1983
- Preceded by: John Skidmore
- Succeeded by: None (abolished)
- Constituency: Swan
- In office 19 February 1983 – 4 August 1994
- Preceded by: None (new creation)
- Succeeded by: Rhonda Parker
- Constituency: Helena

Personal details
- Born: 16 May 1951 (age 75) Collie, Western Australia
- Party: Labor
- Education: University of Western Australia; Murdoch University

Gordon Leslie Hill (born 16 May 1951) is a former Australian politician who was a Labor Party member of the Legislative Assembly of Western Australia from 1982 to 1994. He served as a minister in the governments of Brian Burke, Peter Dowding and Carmen Lawrence.

== Early life ==
Hill was born in Collie, in Western Australia's South West region. He attended Collie Senior High School before going on to Claremont Teachers College and the University of Western Australia, where he trained as a schoolteacher. Hill left the teaching profession in 1975 to work as a research officer with the Federal Minister for the Environment, Joe Berinson. He had joined the Labor Party in 1967. He served as State campaign coordinator in 1976/77 and assistant state secretary in Western Australia from 1977 to 1983. He was also a member of the Federated Miscellaneous Workers' Union.

== Politics ==
Hill was elected to parliament at the 1982 Swan by-election, necessitated by the resignation of the sitting member, John Skidmore. He transferred to the new seat of Helena at the 1983 state election, which he would hold for the rest of his time in parliament. Hill was made a government whip after the 1983 election. After the 1986 election he was initially chairman of the Public Accounts and Expenditure Review Committee before being elevated to the ministry as Minister for Police and Emergency Services and Minister for Multicultural and Ethnic Affairs. After Peter Dowding became premier in 1988, he lost the police portfolio to Ian Taylor and was instead made Minister for Employment and Training. He retained Multicultural and Ethnic Affairs and also gained Technical and Further Education.

In a cabinet reshuffle after the 1989 state election, Hill lost the employment and training portfolio and instead became Minister for Regional Development and Minister for Fisheries. He again switched portfolios when Carmen Lawrence became premier in February 1990, with his titles being Minister for Fisheries, Minister for Local Government, Minister for Youth and Minister for Sport and Recreation. Hill lost all but the fisheries, trade and investment portfolios in a February 1991 reshuffle, but was additionally made Minister for Mines. He held the mines, fisheries and trade and investment portfolios until Labor's defeat at the 1993 state election, and was also Minister for the Mid-West from February 1991 to September 1992.

Hill continued on in the shadow ministry until August 1994, when he resigned from parliament. He had only narrowly defeated the Liberal candidate, Rhonda Parker, at the 1993 election, and Parker went on to win Helena at the resulting by-election, defeating Labor's Joe Bullock.

== Later life ==
After his retirement, Hill gained a law degree from Murdoch University and established a legal practice in Dunsborough. He served as a director of Firepower International until the company's collapse in 2007. Some of the company's investors later launched a civil suit against him, which resulted in him declaring bankruptcy in 2010. In April 2016, the Supreme Court of Western Australia found that Hill had defrauded investors of approximately A$4.3 million, and he was ordered to repay that amount.

Parliament of Western Australia
Preceded by John Skidmore	Member for Swan; 1982–1983	Abolished
New creation	Member for Helena; 1983–1994	Succeeded by Rhonda Parker
Political offices
Preceded by Bob Pearce	Minister for Police and Emergency Services; 1986–1988	Succeeded by Ian Taylor
Preceded by Kay Hallahan	Minister for Multicultural and Ethnic Affairs; 1986–1990	Succeeded by Carmen Lawrence
Preceded by Peter Dowding	Minister for Employment and Training; 1988–1989	Succeeded by Gavan Troy
Preceded by Jeff Carr	Minister for Regional Development; 1989–1990	Succeeded by Pam Buchanan
Preceded by Julian Grill	Minister for Fisheries; 1989–1993	Succeeded by Monty House
Preceded by Kay Hallahan	Minister for Local Government; 1990–1991	Succeeded by David Smith
Preceded by Graham Edwards	Minister for Youth; 1990–1991	Abolished
Preceded by Graham Edwards	Minister for Sport and Recreation; 1990–1991	Succeeded by Graham Edwards
Preceded by Jeff Carr	Minister for Mines; 1991–1993	Succeeded by George Cash
Preceded by Jeff Carr	Minister for the Mid-West; 1991–1992	Succeeded by Ian Taylor
