= Minister for State Development (Western Australia) =

Minister for State Development, Jobs and Trade

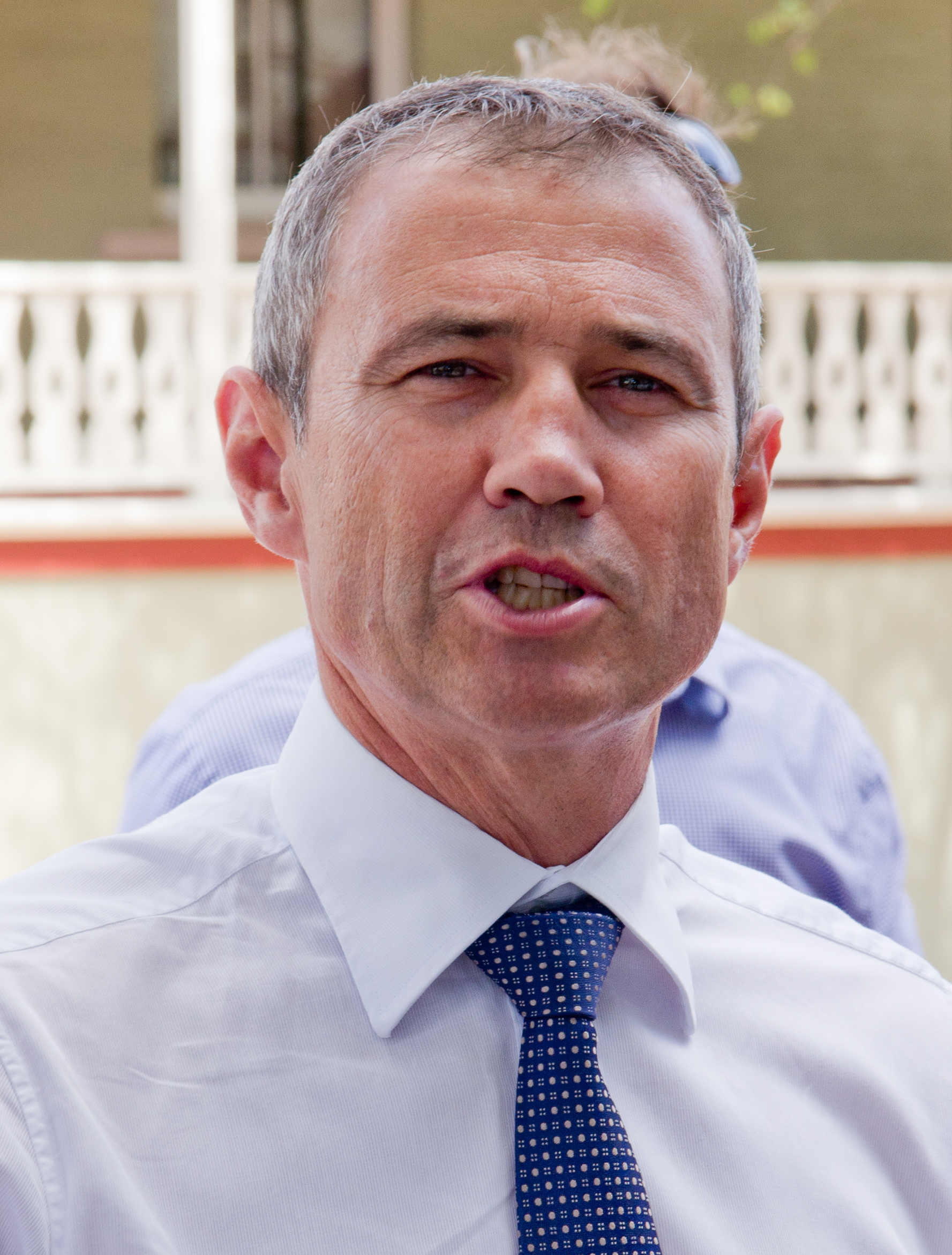
- Incumbent; Roger Cook since 19 March 2021
- Department of State Development
- Style: The Honourable
- Nominator: Premier of Western Australia
- Appointer: Governor of Western Australia
- Inaugural holder: James Mitchell (as Minister for Industries)
- Formation: 16 September 1910
- Website: Premier Mark McGowan

The Minister for State Development, Jobs and Trade is a position in the government of Western Australia, currently held by Roger Cook of the Labor Party. The position was first created in 1910, for the government of Frank Wilson, and has existed in most governments since then, including every government after 1939. The minister is responsible for the state government's Department of State Development.

== List of ministers ==
Order	Minister	Party	Premier	Title	Term start	Term end
1	James Mitchell	None		Minister for Industries	16 September 1910	7 October 1911
1911–1916: no minister – responsibilities held by other ministers
	James Mitchell (again)	Liberal		Minister for Industries	27 July 1916	28 June 1917
2	Robert Robinson	Nationalist		Minister for Industries	28 June 1917	21 June 1919
3	John Scaddan	Country		Minister for Industries	25 June 1919	22 March 1924
4	William Angwin	Labor		Minister for Industries	16 April 1924	30 April 1927
1927–1930: no minister – responsibilities held by other ministers
	John Scaddan (again)	Nationalist		Minister for Industry	24 April 1930	24 April 1933
5	James Kenneally	Labor		Minister for Industrial Development	24 April 1933	26 March 1935
1935–1939: no minister – responsibilities held by other ministers
6	Albert Hawke	Labor		Minister for Industrial Development	18 April 1939	1 April 1947
7	Arthur Watts	Country		Minister for Industrial Development	1 April 1947	23 February 1953
	Albert Hawke (again)	Labor		Minister for Industrial Development	23 February 1953	13 May 1954
8	Lionel Kelly	Labor		Minister for Industrial Development	13 May 1954	19 December 1957
	Albert Hawke (again)	Labor		Minister for Industrial Development	19 December 1957	13 November 1958
9	Frank Wise	Labor		Minister for Industrial Development	13 November 1958	2 April 1959
10	Charles Court	Liberal	Court	Minister for Industrial Development	2 April 1959	3 March 1971
11	Herb Graham	Labor		Minister for Industrial Development	3 March 1971	12 October 1971
11	Herb Graham	Labor		Minister for Development and Decentralisation	12 October 1971	30 May 1973
12	Don Taylor	Labor		Minister for Development and Decentralisation	30 May 1973	8 April 1974
13	Andrew Mensaros	Liberal		Minister for Industrial Development	8 April 1974	5 March 1980
14	Peter Jones	National Country		Minister for Industrial Development and Commerce and Minister for Resources Development	5 March 1980	11 June 1982
14	Peter Jones	National Country		Minister for Resources Development	11 June 1982	25 February 1983
15	Barry MacKinnon	Liberal		Minister for Industrial, Commercial, and Regional Development	11 June 1982	25 February 1983
16	Mal Bryce	Labor		Minister for Economic Development and Technology	25 February 1983	23 December 1983
16	Mal Bryce	Labor		Minister for Industrial Development	23 December 1983	25 February 1986
16	Mal Bryce	Labor		Minister for Industry and Technology	25 February 1986	25 February 1988
17	David Parker	Labor		Minister for Economic Development and Trade	25 February 1988	28 February 1989
17	David Parker	Labor		Minister for Resources Development	28 February 1989	19 February 1990
18	Ian Taylor	Labor		Minister for Finance and Economic Development	19 February 1990	20 December 1990
18	Ian Taylor	Labor		Minister for State Development	20 December 1990	16 February 1993
19	Colin Barnett	Liberal	Barnett	Minister for Resources Development	16 February 1993	16 February 2001
20	Clive Brown	Labor		Minister for State Development	16 February 2001	3 March 2005
21	Alan Carpenter	Labor		Minister for State Development	3 March 2005	13 December 2006
22	Eric Ripper	Labor		Minister for State Development	13 December 2006	23 September 2008
	Colin Barnett (again)	Liberal		Minister for State Development	23 September 2008	31 March 2016
23	Bill Marmion	Liberal		Minister for State Development	31 March 2016	17 March 2017
24	Mark McGowan	Labor	McGowan	Minister for State Development, Jobs and Trade	17 March 2017	19 March 2021
25	Roger Cook	Labor	McGowan	Minister for State Development, Jobs and Trade	19 March 2021	present
25	Roger Cook	Labor	Cook	Minister for State Development, Jobs and Trade	19 March 2021	present

== See also ==
- Minister for Energy (Western Australia)
- Minister for Mines and Petroleum (Western Australia)
- Minister for Regional Development (Western Australia)
