= Pam Beggs =

Australian politician

The Honourable Pam Beggs

Member of the Legislative Assembly of Western Australia
- In office 19 February 1983 – 6 February 1993
- Preceded by: Mick Nanovich
- Succeeded by: Rob Johnson
- Constituency: Whitford

Personal details
- Born: Pamela Anne Austin; 23 May 1947 (age 79) Inverell, New South Wales, Australia
- Party: Labor

Pamela Anne Beggs (née Austin; born 23 May 1947) is an Australian former politician who was a Labor Party member of the Legislative Assembly of Western Australia from 1983 to 1993, representing the seat of Whitford.

Beggs was born in Inverell, New South Wales, and raised in country Western Australia, attending primary school in Greenbushes and Bridgetown High School and St Joseph's College, Bunbury. After leaving school, she served in the Women's Royal Australian Air Force for a period, and subsequently worked as a dietician and as a laboratory assistant.

After her marriage in 1972, she and her husband operated a roadhouse near Geraldton for a period, later moving to the northern suburbs of Perth. Beggs joined the Australian Labor Party in 1977, and at the 1983 state election was preselected for the seat of Whitford. She won the contest with 57.7 percent of the vote, as Labor (led by Brian Burke) won in a landslide.

Following the 1986 election, where she increased her majority, Beggs was appointed to the Burke ministry as Minister for Tourism and Minister for Racing and Gaming. She and Kay Hallahan became the first women to serve as ministers in a Labor government. When Burke retired in 1988, Beggs retained her portfolios in the new ministry led by Peter Dowding, and was additionally made Minister for Housing. In a reshuffle in February 1989, she was kept on as Minister for Housing and also made Minister for Planning, but lost her other portfolios. When Carmen Lawrence became premier in February 1990, Beggs was made Minister for Transport in the Lawrence ministry, and also regained two of her previous titles (becoming Minister for Tourism and Minister for Racing and Gaming for a second time). However, at the 1993 state election, she was defeated in Whitford by the Liberal candidate, Rob Johnson, bringing her career in politics to an end. The Lawrence government was also defeated.

In 2025, Beggs was made an honorary freemen of the City of Joondalup.

Parliament of Western Australia
Preceded by Mick Nanovich	Member for Whitford; 1983–1993	Succeeded by Rob Johnson
Political offices
Preceded by Des Dans; Julian Grill	Minister for Tourism; 1986–1989; 1990–1993	Succeeded by Julian Grill; Doug Shave
Preceded by Des Dans; Graham Edwards	Minister for Racing and Gaming; 1986–1989; 1990–1993	Succeeded by Graham Edwards; Max Evans
Preceded by Keith Wilson	Minister for Housing; 1988–1990	Succeeded by Yvonne Henderson
Preceded by Bob Pearce	Minister for Planning; 1989–1990	Succeeded by Kay Hallahan
Preceded by Bob Pearce	Minister for Transport; 1990–1993	Succeeded by Eric Charlton
