= Barry Hodge =

Australian politician

The Honourable Barry Hodge

Member of the Legislative Assembly of Western Australia
- In office 19 February 1977 – 4 February 1989
- Preceded by: John Tonkin
- Succeeded by: Doug Shave
- Constituency: Melville

Personal details
- Born: 16 February 1944 (age 82) Melbourne, Victoria, Australia
- Party: Labor (1965–1992)
- Other political affiliations: Independent (1993)

Barry James Hodge (born 16 February 1944) is a former Australian politician who was a Labor Party member of the Legislative Assembly of Western Australia from 1977 to 1989, representing the seat of Melville.

Hodge was born in Melbourne, but moved to Perth with his family as a child, where he attended CBC Fremantle before going on to Perth Technical College. After leaving school, he worked as a broadcasting technician at various local radio and television stations, including 6IX, 6PR, and TVW. Hodge joined the Labor Party in 1965, and subsequently became involved in the union movement. He served as president of the Hotel and Club Caterers' Union from 1970 to 1972 (a predecessor of the Federated Liquor and Allied Trades Union), and as assistant state secretary of the Labor Party from 1975 to 1977. Hodge entered parliament at the 1977 state election, replacing John Tonkin, a former premier, in the seat of Melville. He retained the seat with an increased majority at the 1980 election.

After the 1980 election, Hodge was appointed to the shadow cabinet of Ron Davies. He remained in the shadow cabinet when Brian Burke replaced Davies as party leader in 1981, and following Labor's victory at the 1983 election was appointed Minister for Health in the Burke ministry. The ministry was reshuffled after the 1986 election, with Hodge becoming Minister for the Environment and Minister for Conservation and Land Management. He retained those positions after Burke's retirement in 1988, and was also made Minister for Waterways in the new ministry led by Peter Dowding. However, at the 1989 state election, Hodge was defeated in Melville by the Liberal candidate, Doug Shave. The two candidates finished equal on the first-preference vote (with 8,159 or 44.3% each), but Shave went on to win by 32 votes (0.2%) on the two-party-preferred vote. After leaving parliament, Hodge was appointed chairman of the Lands and Forests Commission (a state government agency), serving from 1989 to 1994. He resigned from the Labor Party in 1992, and at the 1993 state election contested the Legislative Council as an independent. Standing for the South Metropolitan region, he received 2.91% of the vote, but was not elected.

Parliament of Western Australia
Preceded by John Tonkin	Member for Melville; 1977–1989	Succeeded by Doug Shave
Political offices
Preceded by Ray Young	Minister for Health; 1983–1986	Succeeded by Ian Taylor
Preceded by Ron Davies	Minister for the Environment; 1986–1989	Succeeded by Bob Pearce
Preceded by Ron Davies	Minister for Conservation and Land Management; 1983–1986	Succeeded by Ian Taylor
