= Minister for Energy (Western Australia) =

Minister for Energy is a position in the government of Western Australia. The position was first created after the 1959 state election, for the government of David Brand, and has existed in almost every government since then. The minister is responsible for Energy Policy WA (a standalone sub-department of the state's Department of Mines, Industry Regulation and Safety), which oversees Western Australia's energy sector.

== Titles ==
- 2 April 1959 – 12 October 1971: Minister for Electricity
- 12 October 1971 – 6 July 1972 (two ministers): Minister for Electricity and Minister for Fuel
- 6 July 1972 – 8 April 1974: Minister for Electricity and Fuel
- 8 April 1974 – 23 December 1983: Minister for Fuel and Energy
- 23 December 1983 – 25 February 1988: Minister for Minerals and Energy
- 28 February 1989 – 5 February 1991: Minister for Mines, Fuel and Energy
- 5 February 1991 – 16 February 1993: Minister for Fuel and Energy
- 16 February 1993 – 19 March 2025: Minister for Energy
- 19 March 2025 – present: Minister for Energy and Decarbonisation

== List of ministers ==
Term start	Term end	Minister(s)	Party
2 April 1959	31 January 1962	Arthur Watts	Country
1 February 1962	11 April 1962	Edgar Lewis	Country
11 April 1962	3 March 1971	Crawford Nalder	Country
3 March 1971	12 October 1971	Colin Jamieson	Labor
12 October 1971	6 July 1972	Arthur Bickerton (Fuel)	Labor
12 October 1971	6 July 1972	Don May (Electricity)	Labor
6 July 1972	8 April 1974	Don May	Labor
8 April 1974	5 March 1980	Andrew Mensaros	Liberal
5 March 1980	25 February 1983	Peter Jones	National Country
25 February 1983	23 December 1983	Peter Dowding	Labor
23 December 1983	25 February 1988	David Parker	Labor
28 February 1989	5 February 1991	Jeff Carr	Labor
5 February 1991	16 February 1993	Geoff Gallop	Labor
16 February 1993	16 February 2001	Colin Barnett	Liberal
16 February 2001	10 March 2005	Eric Ripper	Labor
10 March 2005	3 February 2006	Alan Carpenter	Labor
3 February 2006	23 September 2008	Fran Logan	Labor
23 September 2008	21 March 2013	Peter Collier	Liberal
21 March 2013	17 March 2017	Mike Nahan	Liberal
17 March 2017	13 December 2018	Ben Wyatt	Labor
13 December 2018	8 December 2023	Bill Johnston	Labor
8 December 2023	19 March 2025	Reece Whitby	Labor
19 March 2025		Amber-Jade Sanderson	Labor

== See also ==
- Minister for Mines and Petroleum (Western Australia)
- Minister for Regional Development (Western Australia)
- Minister for State Development (Western Australia)
