= Peter Dowding =

Australian politician (born 1943)

Peter Dowding SC
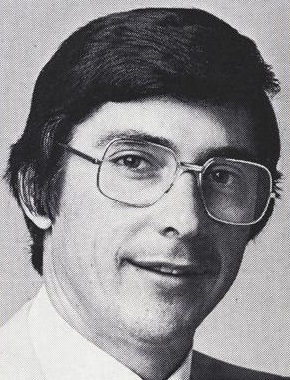

24th Premier of Western Australia
- In office 25 February 1988 – 12 February 1990
- Monarch: Elizabeth II
- Governor: Gordon Reid
- Deputy: David Parker
- Preceded by: Brian Burke
- Succeeded by: Carmen Lawrence

Treasurer of Western Australia
- In office 25 February 1988 – 28 February 1989
- Premier: Himself
- Preceded by: Brian Burke
- Succeeded by: David Parker

Leader of the Western Australian Labor Party
- In office 25 February 1988 – 12 February 1990
- Deputy: David Parker
- Preceded by: Brian Burke
- Succeeded by: Carmen Lawrence

Member of the Western Australian Legislative Assembly
- In office 8 February 1986 – 26 April 1990
- Preceded by: John Harman
- Succeeded by: Judy Edwards
- Constituency: Maylands

Member of the Western Australian Legislative Council
- In office 22 May 1980 – 15 January 1986 Serving with Bill Withers, Tom Stephens
- Preceded by: John Tozer
- Succeeded by: Tom Helm
- Constituency: North Province

Personal details
- Born: Peter McCallum Dowding (Note: Some sources say M'Callum.); 6 October 1943 (age 82) Melbourne, Victoria, Australia
- Party: Labor Party
- Spouse: 4
- Children: 5
- Parent: Keith Dowding (father)
- Relatives: Bruce Dowding (uncle)
- Education: University of Western Australia
- Profession: Lawyer

Peter McCallum Dowding SC (born 6 October 1943) is an Australian lawyer and former politician who was the premier of Western Australia from 25 February 1988 until his resignation on 12 February 1990 due to a leadership spill. He was a member of the Parliament of Western Australia from 1980 to 1990 and a member of the Labor Party.

Dowding graduated from the University of Western Australia with a Bachelor of Laws, and he subsequently worked as a solicitor and barrister. In 1980, he was elected to the North Province of the Western Australian Legislative Council, the parliament's upper house. He entered the Burke ministry when Labor won the 1983 state election and changed portfolios several times over the ensuing years due to cabinet reshuffles. At the 1986 state election, Dowding transferred to the Legislative Assembly, the parliament's lower house, winning the safe seat of Maylands.

In December 1987, Premier Brian Burke announced that he would resign on 25 February 1988. Burke picked Dowding as his preferred replacement, with a secret opinion poll showing that he was the best candidate for the party to choose. After several other contenders dropped out of the contest, Dowding was voted in unanimously as the party's leader on 30 December.

Dowding's popularity plunged following controversy caused by WA Inc. On 12 February 1990, he resigned as premier and leader of the Labor Party ahead of almost certain defeat in a Labor Party leadership spill. He was succeeded by Carmen Lawrence. Dowding soon resigned from parliament, and went back to practising law. The royal commission into WA Inc was scathing of Dowding, saying that he "presided over a disastrous series of decisions".

== Early life and career ==
Dowding was born on 6 October 1943 in Melbourne, Victoria, Australia. His parents were Keith McCallum Dowding, a high-profile Presbyterian minister and left-wing political activist, and Marjorie Stuart D'Arcey, who died of suicide when Peter was eight. He was educated at various schools in Australia and the United Kingdom, including Caulfield Grammar School in Melbourne, Kelvinside Academy in Glasgow, The Scots College in Sydney, and Hale School in Perth, Western Australia. As a teenager, he joined the Labor Party. Keith Dowding was also a member of the Labor Party and had attempted to enter Federal Parliament several times, but he was expelled in the early 1960s for his opposition to the White Australia policy. Dowding earned a Bachelor of Laws degree from the University of Western Australia in 1964, and was admitted to the bar in December 1966.

In 1970, Dowding married his first wife, with whom he had two sons. Between 1967 and 1972, he represented over 100 Vietnam War conscientious objectors, successfully defending over 30 of them. He also represented protesters who had been arrested at the Naval Communication Station Harold E. Holt, a U.S.-operated naval base in Exmouth. The case gained notoriety when Dowding proved that the police officers involved in the incident had swapped their name badges to prevent them from being identified. In 1968, Dowding entered into partnership as Paterson and Dowding, where he concentrated on family law, soon becoming the best divorce lawyer in Perth according to The Sydney Morning Herald. He became a senior partner in 1977 and he sold out of the firm in 1980. From March 1975 until April 1976, Dowding was on the Kalamunda Shire Council, and in 1976 and 1977, he worked as a notary public with the Aboriginal Legal Service in Port Hedland, during which he met his second wife, a Ngarluma woman from Roebourne.

In 1977, Dowding represented defeated Labor Party candidate Ernie Bridge in a landmark case in the Court of Disputed Returns. At the 1977 state election, Bridge was defeated by Liberal candidate Alan Ridge by 93 votes in the electoral district of Kimberley. The Liberal Party had worked to disenfranchise Aboriginal voters, many of whom were illiterate, by having lawyers stand outside polling stations to question their right to vote. The court found that over 90 people were illegally prevented from voting, and so the results were overturned. The resulting 1977 Kimberley state by-election saw Ridge win again. In 1980, he married his second wife, with whom he had one daughter and one son.

== Early political career ==
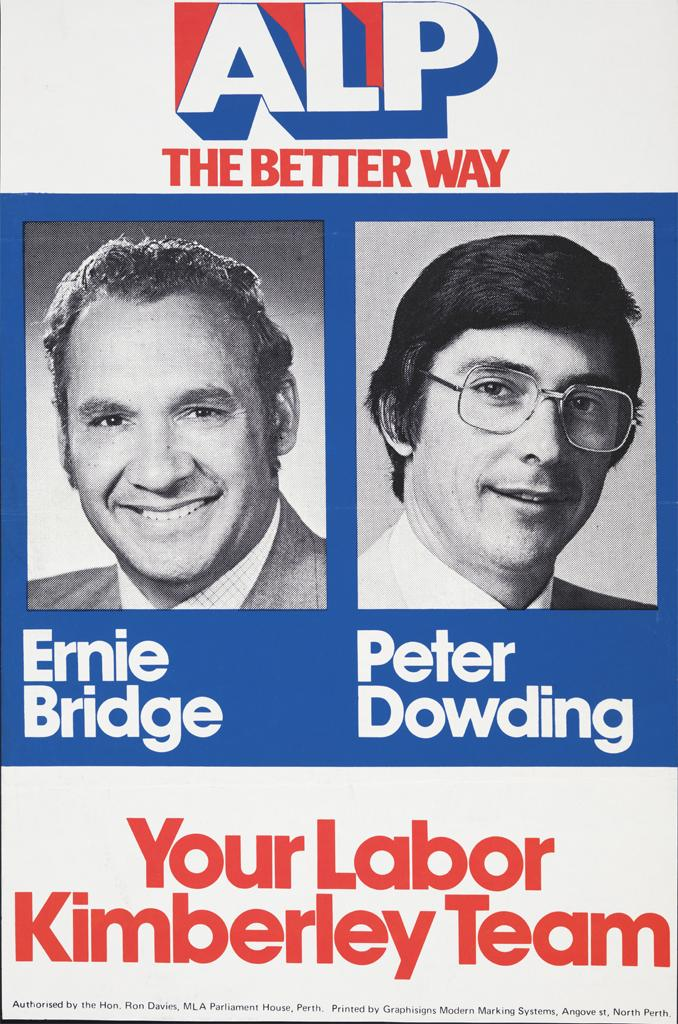
Campaign poster featuring Dowding and Kimberley candidate Ernie Bridge

Ahead of the 1980 Western Australian state election, Dowding put himself forward to be the Labor candidate for the North Province, a Legislative Council seat which covered the northern side of the state, including the Pilbara and the Kimberley. With no other Labor members seeking preselection, he was endorsed as the seat's Labor candidate. At the election, he beat incumbent Liberal Party candidate John Tozer. Dowding was well supported by the province's large Aboriginal population, having promised to help them gain land rights and self-management. His term commenced on 22 May 1980.

Upon Labor's victory at the February 1983 state election under Brian Burke, Dowding was made the minister for mines and the minister for fuel and energy. Dowding's inclusion in the ministry was a surprise, as he was the only member that was not part of Burke's shadow ministry. Dowding was replacing Mike Barnett, who did not nominate himself for the ministry due to family reasons. In 1983, the Department of Mines and the Department of Resource Development merged to form the Department of Minerals and Energy, following a report commissioned by the previous government that was critical of the interdepartmental conflicts which occurred. This necessitated a cabinet reshuffle. On 23 December 1983, Dowding became the minister for planning, the minister for employment and training, and the minister for consumer affairs. At a cabinet reshuffle on 20 December 1984, he relinquished being the minister for planning and he became the minister for industrial relations in addition to being the minister for employment and training, and the minister for consumer affairs.

At the February 1986 state election, Dowding left his Legislative Council seat to contest the Legislative Assembly seat of Maylands in a move widely seen as a step towards becoming premier. Maylands was a safe seat for the Labor Party, and was held by the retiring John Harman. Dowding retained the seat for the Labor Party at the election, after which, he stopped being the minister for consumer affairs. In Perth, Dowding lived in the suburb of Mount Lawley. From October 1986, in addition to his two prior ministries, he became the minister assisting the minister for public sector management. He was given the responsibility of implementing the changes recommended in a parliamentary white paper, Managing change in the public sector, which included the public sector being more selective with choosing employees, attempting to retain graduates, and cutting back on staff in health. In his role as minister for employment and training, he embarked on a tour of Europe, where he developed an interest in Sweden's regulated economy. It was in Stockholm where he met his third wife. He convinced her to move to Australia, and in October 1987, they married at the old Perth Observatory. His positions were renamed to the minister for productivity and employment, and the minister for labour in a March 1987 cabinet reshuffle. He also became the minister for works and services in that reshuffle.

== Premier ==
After months of speculation, in December 1987, Burke announced his intention to resign as premier and from parliament on 25 February 1988. Burke had named Dowding as his preferred successor. A secret opinion poll conducted by the Labor Party in March 1987 found that Dowding was the most "electorally acceptable" candidate, however some trade unions and sections of the Labor Party disliked Dowding. Other contenders were David Parker, Bob Pearce, and Julian Grill, however they all pulled out of contention before the 30 December Labor caucus vote due to Burke's influence, the opinion poll, and the desire for the party to be united. Dowding was unanimously elected as the leader of the Labor Party and Parker was unanimously elected as deputy leader, replacing Mal Bryce, who had also announced his intention to resign.

Dowding and his ministry were sworn in by Governor Gordon Reid on 25 February 1988. Dowding gave himself the positions of treasurer, minister for productivity, minister for public sector management and minister for women's interests. The changes made to cabinet were designed to replace ministers who had accrued controversy in their roles. This meant that Gordon Hill was replaced as the minister for police by Ian Taylor and Pearce was replaced as the minister for education by Carmen Lawrence, a cabinet newcomer.

Dowding was not part of any Labor Party faction. When asked about this, he replied that "my heart beats in the direction of giving Labor the opportunity to govern. Social issues are not the prerogative of the Left. The Left gets sidetracked and the Right gets sidetracked. If my heart beats anywhere, it's in the centre." In 2012, Dowding said in an interview that "I regarded myself as Left but I was in the centre. The Left was right socially and the Right was very right and I did not form allegiances very well."

The March 1988 by-elections in the electoral districts of Ascot and Balga had swings away from the Labor Party of 14.8 percent and 21.3 percent respectively, which Dowding blamed on both the state and federal governments. The high informal vote caused the Dowding government to reverse the Burke government's 1987 addition of ticket voting in the Legislative Assembly.

An opinion poll released in April 1988 found that 48 percent of those surveyed had no opinion on Dowding's performance. In an effort to increase his profile, the Labor Party ran a television advertisement campaign, Dowding released a comprehensive development strategy, and he adopted a higher profile when dealing with an industrial dispute. Polls in May and June showed that his profile had risen, with the undecided people falling to 22 percent. Those who rated him as "good" rose from 13 percent in April to 22 percent in June, those who rated him as "fair" rose from 33 percent to 50 percent, and those who rated him as "poor" stayed steady at 6 percent.

Although the Labor Government was quite popular at the time, the WA Inc scandal was starting to surface. The stock market crashed in October 1987, which spelled trouble for some of the government's private investments. The Rothwells merchant bank went into liquidation in November 1988. Dowding said the government could lose up to $100 million from the bank's collapse, however opposition frontbencher Bill Hassell said it would cost the government $400 million. The opposition ruled out blocking supply though. In November, the Labor Party paid for a two-minute prime time television commercial where Dowding made a speech promising that no more taxpayer money would be spent on Rothwells.

Additionally, the government was under fire after the Teachers' Credit Society donated $5,000 to the Labor Party in April 1987 after receiving an extension on a loan from the R&I Bank, a state-owned bank. The donation was given back soon afterwards.

In the 1988–89 state budget, there was 23 percent more spending on education and 26 percent more spending on police. This meant one thousand more police officers within three years, as well as five hundred more teachers and 250 support staff for schools. This was in response to a 1988 national survey which showed that Western Australia had the largest classes in Australia. 66 percent of junior secondary classes had more than 25 students, and 36 percent had more than 30 students. The budget also included the release of two thousand state housing homes for sale, and the promise to build an electric railway line to Joondalup at a cost of $124 million.

At the 1989 state election, the Labor Party had a primary vote swing of 10.5 percent against it, and a two-party-preferred swing of 6.5 percent against it. Despite this, the party only lost one net seat in the Legislative Assembly, as the largest swings occurred in safe Labor seats and marginal seats generally had smaller swings. Labor's 31 seats out of 57 were enough for a majority. Following the election, Dowding reshuffled his cabinet, relinquishing his position as treasurer and the minister for productivity.

== Leadership spill ==
Within six months of the 1989 election, some Labor MPs were dissatisfied with Dowding, finding him arrogant, rude, and difficult to work with. His popularity was also hurt by the District Court trial of Western Colleries Limited (Note: Western Colleries Limited was a subsidiary of Rothwells, a company at the centre of WA Inc.) director Tony Lloyd. His defence lawyers had argued that Dowding and acting energy minister Grill had ordered Lloyd to pay off a Rothwells debt using a $15 million cheque. In January 1990, Lloyd was found guilty of acting improperly, making him the first person convicted for an offence relating to WA Inc. (Note: Tony Lloyd was cleared of acting improperly in the court of appeal in May 1990.) After that, opinion polls showed support was as low as 32 percent. Additionally, the 1990 Australian federal election was coming up, and the Labor Party wanted to limit the seats lost by the party in Western Australia. Having a state leader less associated with WA Inc would have helped with that.

In early 1990, Dowding travelled to the World Economic Forum in Switzerland, after Parker assured him that nothing would happen to his leadership while he was gone. State Secretary Stephen Smith, FMWU Secretary Jim McGinty, and seven Labor politicians – Lawrence, Parker, Taylor, Kay Hallahan, Keith Wilson, Geoff Gallop and Pam Beggs – met together to discuss Peter Dowding's leadership, all deciding that he should be forced out. By 7 February 1990, a majority of the 47 members of the Labor caucus had signed a letter calling for Dowding's resignation. He returned early from the World Economic Forum on 8 February in order to shore up his leadership, spending the next several days speaking to party members in an attempt to ensure their support. He also held a cabinet meeting on 9 February. At a caucus meeting on 12 February, Dowding and Parker resigned from their positions. Lawrence was elected as the leader of the Labor Party and Taylor was elected as the deputy leader. They were sworn in as premier and deputy premier respectively later that day by the acting governor. On that day, Lawrence promised to end WA Inc. Dowding criticised the leadership challenge, saying that the timing was premature and was done to help Labor win the federal election, rather than for what's good for the state.

On 5 April 1990, Parker announced his impending resignation from Parliament. Although he planned on doing so later, Dowding resigned as well on 26 April 1990 to return to his career as a lawyer. Dowding said he had wanted to serve at least part of the upcoming session of Parliament, so he could defend his actions that lead to his downfall, but he resigned when he did at the request of Lawrence, who wanted the two by-elections to occur on the same day. Judy Edwards retained the seat for Labor, succeeding Dowding as the member for Maylands at the by-election.

== WA Inc royal commission ==
Lawrence initially resisted calls for a royal commission into WA Inc, but after months of pressure, she announced in November 1990 that the royal commission would go ahead.

Dowding testified in front of the commission in November 1991 regarding his dealings with Laurie Connell and Alan Bond, the bailout of Rothwells and the purchase of the Kwinana Petrochemical Plant. When asked if the state government had moved to safeguard the $150 million guarantee to Rothwells, Dowding said "you don't assume that Bond would steal $1.2 billion or that Mr Connell would deceive and live like a parasite off the state." When asked about the government's purchase of the petrochemical project, Dowding said that it was effectively a second rescue for Rothwells, but that he believed the project was viable and would not have made the deal otherwise.

The commission handed down its first report on 20 October 1992, which made adverse findings against Dowding. The report said that "we have found that Mr Dowding acted improperly in interfering in the business affairs of the SGIC." Dowding responded by saying that some of the commission's judgements of him were wrong, but that he was relieved the report did not find any of his decisions were corrupt or for financial gain.

== Later life ==
After leaving parliament, Dowding was admitted to the bar in New South Wales. He was a partner in Briggs Paul Dowding in Sydney from 1992 to 1994, and a managing partner of DCH Legal Group in Perth from 1993 to 1996. Since 1996, he has practiced family law. In 2002, he was appointed as Senior Counsel in Western Australia. He was a recipient of a Centenary Medal in 2003.

Dowding divorced his third wife and on Boxing Day 2004, he married for the fourth time at the Round House in Fremantle.

As of 2022, Dowding lives in South Fremantle. In August 2023, he released a book co-authored with Ken Spillman about the life of his uncle, Bruce Dowding, who was part of the French Resistance and worked to smuggle Allied servicemen out of Nazi-occupied France in 1940 and 1941. He was eventually caught by the Gestapo and executed in 1943.

== See also ==
- Electoral results for the district of Maylands
- List of Caulfield Grammar School people
- List of Old Boys of The Scots College (Sydney)
- List of Old Haleians

== Notes ==
Parliament of Western Australia
Preceded by John Tozer	Member for the North Province; 22 May 1980 – 15 January 1986; With: Bill Withers, Tom Stephens	Succeeded by Tom Helm
Preceded by John Harman	Member for Maylands; 8 February 1986 – 26 April 1990	Succeeded by Judy Edwards
Political offices
Preceded by Brian Burke	Premier of Western Australia; 25 February 1988 – 12 February 1990	Succeeded by Carmen Lawrence
Preceded by Brian Burke	Treasurer of Western Australia; 25 February 1988 – 28 February 1989	Succeeded by David Parker
Party political offices
Preceded by Brian Burke	Leader of the Labor Party in Western Australia; 25 February 1988 – 12 February 1990	Succeeded by Carmen Lawrence
