= Diploma of Education =

Postgraduate qualification

The Diploma of Education, often abbreviated to DipEd or GradDipEd, is a postgraduate qualification offered in many Commonwealth countries including Australia, Sri Lanka, New Zealand, and the United Kingdom.

== Overview ==
The diploma can build on the general or disciplinary knowledge of a bachelor's degree to prepare students to teach in schools although this is no longer true of the UK where Qualified Teacher Status is the recognized professional qualification for those wishing to teach in (state) maintained primary and secondary schools. However, in the UK holders of the Cert Ed, awarded after completing a three-year teacher training course, could use the diploma as a route to degree equivalence, and if passed at the appropriate level progress to a master's degree in education. The Graduate Diploma in Education is a one-year teacher preparation program for students who already hold a tertiary degree.

Specialisation within the course usually enables one to become a primary or secondary teacher, or a teacher in an early childhood center or adult education environment such as TAFE (a TAFE Teacher holding only a DipEd will typically be required to complete a Certificate IV in Training and Assessment [CertIVTAA] or a Diploma in Vocational Education Teaching [DipVET] in addition to their DipEd qualification) or a business college, and to join the relevant professional association. Achievement of a Diploma of Education does not normally confer registration status, but is a pathway to registration as a teacher.

The DipEd typically takes one year of full-time study (up to two years part-time) and students are generally required to undertake professional practicums (or "pracs") alongside their theory units in order to graduate. It offers an alternative to the three- or four-year Bachelor of Education for those who already have a degree in another area (e.g. Bachelor of Science or Bachelor of Arts) and wish to specialise in that area.

In Australia, the Graduate Diploma in Education, typically a 1-year programme, was gradually phased out in favour of a 2-year Master of Teaching course. This is the result of a requirement by the Australian Institution for Teaching and School Leadership that post graduate qualification must be of 2 years' duration. All graduate diploma programs will be phased out by December 2017. After qualifying and passing inspection following the probationary period as a starting teacher, usually one year in service, the Diploma in Teaching (DipTeach) is awarded as a professional qualification.

In New Zealand, the course is referred to as a Diploma of Teaching (DipTchg). Auckland University offers separate diplomas for primary and secondary teachers, while Waikato University offers a single Postgraduate Diploma in Teaching with the option to specialise in Primary or Secondary.
