= Francis Burt (judge) =

Australian jurist

The Honourable Sir Francis Burt AC KCMG QC

27th Governor of Western Australia
- In office 20 March 1990 – 31 October 1993
- Monarch: Elizabeth II
- Premier: Carmen Lawrence; Richard Court
- Preceded by: Gordon Reid
- Succeeded by: Michael Jeffery

11th Chief Justice of Western Australia
- In office 1977–1988
- Preceded by: Sir Lawrence Jackson
- Succeeded by: David Malcolm

Personal details
- Born: Francis Theodore Page Burt; 14 June 1918 Mosman Park, Western Australia
- Died: 8 September 2004 (aged 86) Perth, Western Australia
- Education: University of Western Australia
- Nickname: "Red"

Military service
- Allegiance: Australia
- Branch/service: Royal Australian Navy; Royal Australian Air Force
- Years of service: 1940–1942 (RAN); 1943–1946 (RAAF)
- Rank: Flight Lieutenant
- Unit: HMAS Leeuwin; No. 10 Squadron RAAF
- Battles/wars: Second World War

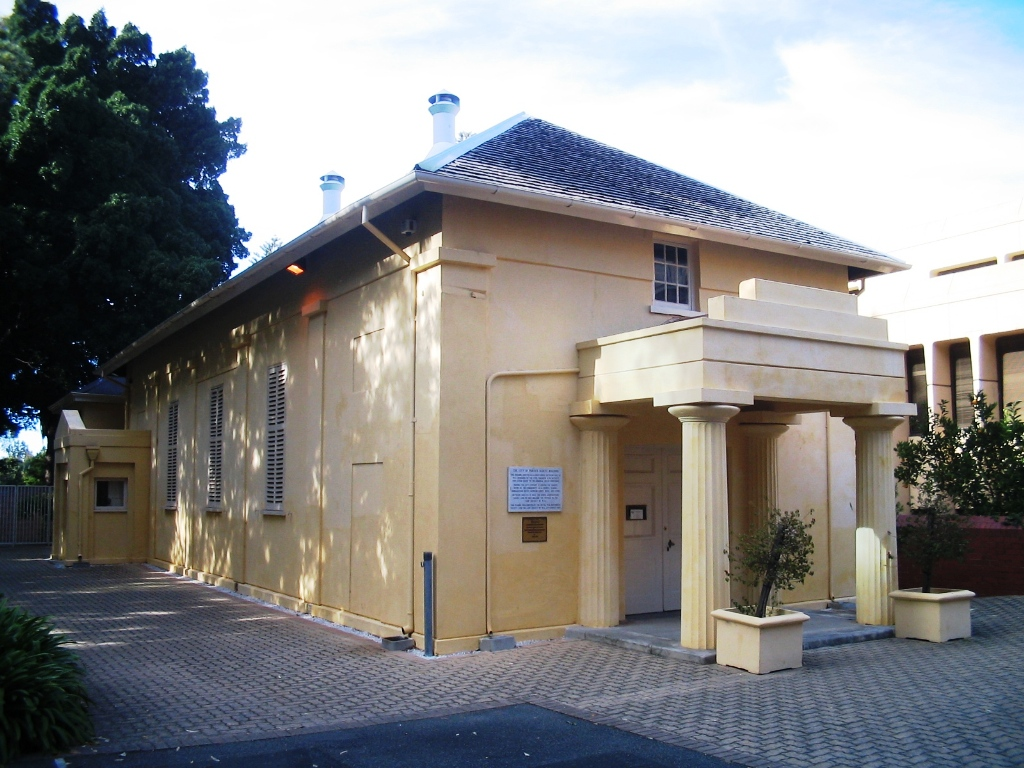
The Old Courthouse adjoining the Supreme Court Buildings in Stirling Gardens which house the Francis Burt Law Education Centre and Museum.

Sir Francis Theodore Page Burt AC KCMG QC (14 June 1918 – 8 September 2004) was an Australian jurist who served as the 11th Chief Justice of Western Australia, from 1977 to 1988, and the 27th Governor of Western Australia, from 1990 to 1993.

Burt was born in Cottesloe, a suburb of Perth Western Australia, and educated at Guildford Grammar School. He studied law at the University of Western Australia, and also served in the Royal Australian Navy and the Royal Australian Air Force during the Second World War. Burt was made a judge of the Supreme Court of Western Australia in 1969 and was promoted to Chief Justice in 1977. As Chief Justice, he served as lieutenant-governor. When the Governor of Western Australia, Gordon Reid, resigned in 1989, Burt was appointed to succeed him and served as governor until 1993.

== Biography ==
Born in Mosman Park, Western Australia, Burt's great-grandfather, Sir Archibald Burt, was Chief Justice of Western Australia from 1861 to 1879, while his grandfather, Septimus Burt, was Attorney-General and Agent-General when responsible government was granted to Western Australia in December 1890. Archibald Burt had been a slaveholder in the West Indies. Burt was educated at Guildford Grammar School and later studied law at the University of Western Australia. During the Second World War he served in the Royal Australian Navy and the Royal Australian Air Force.

After being admitted to the Bar in 1941, Burt gained his skills as a Queen's Counsel in 1959, and in 1961 founded the independent Bar in Western Australia. With others, he established Bar Chambers in 1962. He was appointed a judge of the Supreme Court of Western Australia in 1969, a position he held until 1977 when he was promoted to Chief Justice of Western Australia. He retired in 1988.

Burt was afforded a state funeral on his death in 2004. He is buried at Karrakatta Cemetery. The Francis Burt Chambers located in Allendale Square, Perth, and the Francis Burt Law Education Centre and Museum in Stirling Gardens are both named in his honour.

Legal offices
Preceded by Sir Lawrence Jackson	Chief Justice of Western Australia; 1977–1988	Succeeded by David Malcolm
Government offices
Preceded by Gordon Reid	Governor of Western Australia; 1990–1993	Succeeded by Major General Michael Jeffery
