= Gordon Reid (governor) =

Australian politician and academic

The Honourable Gordon Reid AC

26th Governor of Western Australia
- In office 2 July 1984 – 30 September 1989
- Monarch: Elizabeth II
- Premier: Brian Burke; Peter Dowding
- Preceded by: Sir Richard Trowbridge
- Succeeded by: Sir Francis Burt

Personal details
- Born: Gordon Stanley Reid; 22 September 1923 Hurtsville, Sydney, New South Wales
- Died: 26 October 1989 (aged 66) Perth, Western Australia
- Spouse: Ruth Reid
- Education: London School of Economics; Nuffield College, University of Oxford
- Occupation: Clerk

Military service
- Allegiance: Australia
- Branch/service: Royal Australian Air Force
- Years of service: 1942–1946
- Rank: Flying Officer
- Battles/wars: Second World War

Gordon Stanley Reid AC (22 September 1923 – 26 October 1989) was an Australian academic who served as the 26th Governor of Western Australia. He grew up in Hurstville, Sydney, before enlisting in the Royal Australian Air Force, where he served as a flying officer during the Second World War. After the conclusion of the war, Reid studied at the London School of Economics in England and the University of Oxford. He served as the vice-chancellor of the University of Western Australia from 1978 to 1982. Appointed governor in 1984, he served in the position until 1989, resigning a month before his death.

== Early life and education ==
Gordon Stanley Reid was born on 22 September 1923 in Hurstville, a suburb of Sydney, New South Wales. He was educated at Hurstville Central Technical School from 1934 to 1937, before passing the Commonwealth Public Service entrance examination and starting work at 14 as a telegram messenger at Cronulla Post Office.

He enlisted in the Royal Australian Air Force during World War II in 1942, reaching the rank of Flying Officer by the time of his discharge in 1946.

He met and married his wife, Ruth, in Brighton, England, while stationed at RAF Gamston.

After being demobbed and returning to Australia, Reid worked as a reading clerk, accountant, and clerk of papers. He was clerk of records for the Australian House of Representatives from 1952 to 1955, and was Serjeant-at-Arms at Parliament House, Canberra while studying for his commerce degree.

He then travelled to England where he obtained his master's and his Doctor of Philosophy degrees at the London School of Economics. He won a Nuffield Scholarship.

== Academia and writing ==
Reid was appointed senior lecturer in politics and public administration at the University of Adelaide in 1958, where he stayed until 1965. He was appointed foundation professor of politics at the University of Western Australia (UWA) in 1966 (serving 1966–1970, 1974–1978, 1983–1984), also serving as vice-chancellor from 1978 until 1982.

He was the author and joint author of various books and publications on Australian politics, including:

- The politics of financial control (1966)
- Out of the wilderness: the return of Labor (1974)
- The Western Australian elections (1974)
- The premiers of Western Australia, 1890–1982 (1982)

As part of the Australian parliament's bicentenary publications project, Reid, assisted by Martin Forrest, was commissioned to write a history of the parliament.

== Governorship ==
Reid was appointed Governor of Western Australia in 1984.

On 20 August 1989, the Premier, Peter Dowding, announced that Reid had been undergoing extensive surgery for cancer, and would be stepping down as governor.

== Recognition and honours ==
In 1986, Reid was appointed a Companion of the Order of Australia (AC), for public service, for service to learning and to the Crown.

== Personal life ==
=== Ruth Reid ===
Reid married Ruth Amelia Fish, a bank cashier, on 30 June 1945 at Earlsfield Congregational Church in Wandsworth, London. They had two daughters and two sons.

Ruth Amelia Reid (1921-2024; nee Fish) was known for her extensive voluntary work done for the community. Some of the charities for which she volunteered were Save The Children, WA Reconciliation Advisory Group, St John Ambulance, the Blind Institute, Foster Carers' Association, Safety Houses Association, Autism Association of WA, and Camps for Kids.

Among her numerous honours were the following:

- 1 January 2001: Centenary Medal, for service to the community of Western Australia
- 26 January 1998 Member of the Order of Australia (AM) in the Australia Day Honours list, "for service to the community, in particular to charities that focus on assisting women and children"
- 1998: Honorary Doctor of Letters degree from UWA
- 2000: Western Australian Citizen of the Year, for her work in community service
- 2013: Lifetime Contribution to Volunteering Award, presented at the WA Volunteer of the Year Awards

She was also made a Freeman of the cities of Wanneroo, Nedlands, and London.

A portrait painted in oils by Linda van der Merwe is held by the City of Wanneroo art collection.

On her 100th birthday on 17 February 2021, she was joined by Governor Kim Beazley, who brought her a congratulatory message. She died in January 2024, aged 102.

== Death and legacy ==
Reid died of cancer on 26 October 1989 at his home in Nedlands, Perth.

In 1991, the Reid Oration was established by the Western Australian branch of the Institute of Public Administration Australia (IPAA), to honour Reid's contribution to public life. The 2019 oration was presesnted by IPAA Western Australia in collaboration with UWA Public Policy Institute, returning to a former tradition. In that year, the lecture was delivered by Geoff Gallop former Premier of Western Australia.

In 1993, a minor planet discovered by Perth Observatory in 1978 was officially named after Gordon and Ruth Reid, as Minor Planet Reid (no.3422). It is located in the asteroid belt, around 460 million kilometres from the sun.

Papers collected by Reid and his research assistants while researching the history of the Commonwealth Parliament between 1987 and 1988 are held at the National Library of Australia. The files contain notes, articles, newspaper cuttings, and printed materials, along with photocopies of primary resources dating from as far back as 1861.

In 1990, Stateships named a cargo ship the George Reid.

Government offices
Preceded by Sir Richard Trowbridge	Governor of Western Australia; 1984–1989	Succeeded by Sir Francis Burt
