= David Parker (Australian politician) =

Former Western Australian politician

Deputy Premier of Western Australia
- In office 25 February 1988 – 12 February 1990
- Premier: Peter Dowding
- Preceded by: Mal Bryce
- Succeeded by: Ian Taylor

Member of the Western Australian Parliament for Fremantle
- In office 23 February 1980 – 26 April 1990
- Preceded by: John Troy
- Succeeded by: Jim McGinty

Personal details
- Born: David Charles Parker; 22 May 1953 (age 73) Subiaco, Western Australia
- Party: Labor Party

David Charles Parker (born 22 May 1953) is an Australian former politician from Western Australia, serving as a minister in the Burke Ministry (1983–1988), then as Deputy Premier in the Dowding Ministry (1988–1990). He later served a jail term for perjury for evidence given to the WA Inc royal commission.

== Biography ==
David Charles Parker was born in the Perth suburb of Subiaco on 22 May 1953 to Charles (Lex) Parker, a professor of agriculture at the University of Western Australia (UWA), and Dorothy Berghiner, a lecturer in anthropology. He attended Nedlands Primary School and Hollywood Senior High School in Perth, attending Cambridgeshire High School for Boys in 1969 when his father was on sabbatical in Cambridge. He then attended UWA, graduating with a BA in History. During his time at UWA he joined the Labor Party and from 1971 was a member of the state executive of the Party. He served on the student guild for several years, including as its president in 1974–1975. Upon completing his education, he worked as an industrial officer for the Building Workers' Industrial Union, and became a director in Mount Newman Superannuation Pty Ltd. He also rose within the Labor Party, being appointed to its administrative committee in 1976.

Ahead of the 1980 election, he was preselected for the state seat of Fremantle to replace John Troy, who had become controversial through advocating for the Palestinian cause during his time in Parliament. Parker was successful in the election and entered Parliament on 23 February 1980. He was appointed to the shadow ministry in September 1981.

Labor came to power under Brian Burke at the 1983 election, and Parker was appointed Minister for Employment, Planning and Administrative Services, and Minister Assisting the Minister Co-ordinating Economic and Social Development. At 29 years, 9 months and 3 days, he was the youngest person ever appointed to a Western Australian ministry. On 23 December 1983, he was appointed Minister for Minerals and Energy, with most of his former portfolios being transferred to Peter Dowding.

In late 1987, it was announced that Burke and his deputy Mal Bryce would retire from politics on his fifth anniversary of taking office as premier. Burke preferred a combination of Dowding as Premier and Parker as Deputy Premier to succeed him; this was backed up by a secret opinion poll from March 1987 that identified them as having electoral appeal. On 30 December 1987, they won a caucus leadership ballot unopposed and on 25 February 1988, Parker became Deputy Premier. After the 1989 election, he also became Treasurer.

On 12 February 1990, Dowding was forced out of office amid the increasing trouble surrounding WA Inc and the impending federal election at which the party wanted to minimise any loss of seats. Parker was given a junior role (Resources, Trade and the Arts) in the succeeding Lawrence Ministry, but ultimately announced his intention to resign from parliament on 5 April 1990 and left on 26 April. The by-election to replace him resulted in a 7.6% two-party-preferred swing against the government, but left-wing union official Jim McGinty retained the seat for Labor.

Parker's role in various decisions related to WA Inc while responsible for minerals and energy was investigated by the Royal Commission, which delivered its interim report on 19 October 1992. Parker was ultimately sentenced to 12 months' imprisonment on seven charges of misusing party campaign funds in late 1994. The conviction was ultimately quashed on appeal to the High Court of Australia. In 1996 he served six months of an 18-month sentence for perjury over evidence given to the Commission.

In 1997, he moved permanently to Hong Kong and worked in various management roles in energy and chemical companies.
