= Minister for Environment (Western Australia) =

Western Australian ministerial position

Minister for Environment, formerly Minister for the Environment is a position in the government of Western Australia, held by Matthew Swinbourn.

The position was first created in December 1970, in what would be the last months of the government of Sir David Brand. It has existed in every government since then, sometimes under different titles. The minister is responsible two state government departments – the Department of Environment Regulation and the Department of Parks and Wildlife.

== Titles ==
- 10 December 1970 – 8 April 1974: Minister for Environmental Protection
- 8 April 1974 – 25 February 1983: Minister for Conservation and the Environment
- 25 February 1983 – 2008: Minister for the Environment
- 2009 – present: Minister for Environment

== List of ministers ==
| Term start | Term end | Minister | Party |
|---|---|---|---|
| 10 December 1970 | 3 March 1971 | Graham MacKinnon | Liberal |
| 3 March 1971 | 12 October 1971 | John Tonkin | Labor |
| 12 October 1971 | 8 April 1974 | Ron Davies | Labor |
| 8 April 1974 | 20 May 1975 | Matt Stephens | Nat. Country |
| 5 June 1975 | 10 March 1977 | Peter Jones | Nat. Country |
| 10 March 1977 | 25 August 1978 | Graham MacKinnon (again) | Liberal |
| 25 August 1978 | 5 March 1980 | Ray O'Connor | Liberal |
| 5 March 1980 | 25 January 1982 | Gordon Masters | Liberal |
| 25 January 1982 | 25 February 1983 | Ian Laurance | Liberal |
| 25 February 1983 | 25 February 1986 | Ron Davies (again) | Labor |
| 25 February 1986 | 14 February 1989 | Barry Hodge | Labor |
| 28 February 1989 | 21 October 1992 | Bob Pearce | Labor |
| 21 October 1992 | 16 February 1993 | Jim McGinty | Labor |
| 16 February 1993 | 10 February 1995 | Kevin Minson | Liberal |
| 10 February 1995 | 9 January 1997 | Peter Foss | Liberal |
| 9 January 1997 | 16 February 2001 | Cheryl Edwardes | Liberal |
| 16 February 2001 | 3 February 2006 | Judy Edwards | Labor |
| 3 February 2006 | 13 December 2006 | Mark McGowan | Labor |
| 13 December 2006 | 26 February 2007 | Tony McRae | Labor |
| 26 February 2007 | 23 September 2008 | David Templeman | Labor |
| 23 September 2008 | 22 November 2010 | Donna Faragher | Liberal |
| 22 November 2010 | 14 December 2010 | John Day | Liberal |
| 14 December 2010 | 21 March 2013 | Bill Marmion | Liberal |
| 21 March 2013 | 17 March 2017 | Albert Jacob | Liberal |
| 17 March 2017 | 18 March 2021 | Stephen Dawson | Labor |
| 18 March 2021 | 17 December 2021 | Amber-Jade Sanderson | Labor |
| 17 December 2021 | 19 March 2025 | Reece Whitby | Labor |
| 19 March 2025 | incumbent | Matthew Swinbourn | Labor |

== See also ==
- Minister for Agriculture and Food (Western Australia)
- Minister for Fisheries (Western Australia)
- Minister for the Environment and Water (Australia)
- Minister for the Environment (Victoria)
- Minister for Environment and Natural Resources (Northern Territory)
- Minister for Environment and Heritage
