= Kay Hallahan =

Australian politician (born 1941)

Kay Hallahan AO
- Constituency: Council: South-East Metropolitan, East Metropolitan; Assembly: Armadale

Personal details
- Born: 4 November 1941 (age 84) Perth, Western Australia
- Party: Labor Party
- Profession: Policewoman, social worker.

Elsie Kay Hallahan AO (born 4 November 1941) is a member and former deputy leader of the Western Australian Labor Party. She also served as a minister in the Burke, Dowding and Lawrence ministries in Western Australia, and was the first woman to sit in both the Western Australian Legislative Assembly and the Western Australian Legislative Council.

== Career ==
In 1969, Elsie Kay Hallahan joined the Western Australian Police, before moving into social work in 1981. Her social work career included working in the Western Australian Alcohol and Drug Authority.

At the 1983 Western Australian state election, Hallahan won one of the South-East Metropolitan Province seats in the Western Australian Legislative Council. Following the 1986 state election, she became a minister in the Burke Ministry, with the portfolios of Community Services, the Family, Youth, the Aged and Women's Interests, and served in similar roles in the Dowding Ministry. At the 1989 state election, with the transition of the Legislative Council to a proportional system of election, she transferred to the East Metropolitan Region.

With Carmen Lawrence's rise to premier in February 1990, a significant reshuffle saw Hallahan become Minister for Planning, Lands, Heritage and the Arts in Western Australia. She also became Minister for Education on 5 February 1991.

At the 1993 state election, Hallahan moved to the Western Australian Legislative Assembly, where she successfully contested the seat of Armadale, replacing Bob Pearce whose career had effectively been ended by the WA Inc Royal Commission. She served as Deputy Opposition Leader from February 1993 until October 1994. She retired from parliament at the 1996 state election, being succeeded by Alannah MacTiernan (who had also succeeded her in the East Metropolitan seat in the Council in 1993).

In 2002, Hallahan was made an Officer of the Order of Australia (AO) for "service to the community, particularly as an advocate for the needs of children, women and the elderly, in matters of social justice, and to the Parliament of Western Australia." She also became chairperson of Save the Children Australia. At the 2004 federal election, following the death of one preselected candidate and the resignation of her replacement, Hallahan nominated to run for Liberal-held Division of Canning, which included Armadale, but was defeated. Alannah MacTiernan also stood for the Australian Labor Party in Canning at the 2010 federal election, but was also unsuccessful. MacTiernan eventually joined the Federal Parliament, when she won the seat of Perth at the 2013 federal election.

Political offices
| Preceded by Geoff Gallop | Minister for Education; 1991–1993 | Succeeded by Norman Moore |
| Preceded by Yvonne Henderson | Minister for Lands; 1990–1991 | Succeeded by David Smith |
Western Australian Legislative Council
| Preceded by Phillip Pendal | Member for South-East Metropolitan Province; 1983–1989 | Province abolished |
| Region created | Member for East Metropolitan; 1989–1993 | Succeeded by Alannah MacTiernan |
Western Australian Legislative Assembly
| Preceded by Bob Pearce | Member for Armadale; 1993–1996 | Succeeded by Alannah MacTiernan |
