= Minister for Mines and Petroleum (Western Australia) =

Position in the government of Australia

Minister for Mines and Petroleum is a position in the government of Western Australia, currently held by Bill Johnston of the Labor Party. The position was first created in 1894, for the government of Sir John Forrest, and has existed in almost every government since then. The minister is responsible for the state government's Department of Mines and Petroleum, which oversees Western Australia's resources sector.

== Titles ==
- 19 December 1894 – 23 December 1983: Minister for Mines
- 23 December 1983 – 25 February 1988: Minister for Minerals and Energy
- 25 February 1988 – 16 February 2001: Minister for Mines
- 3 February 2006 – 23 September 2008: Minister for Resources
- 23 September 2008 – present: Minister for Mines and Petroleum

== List of ministers ==
Term start	Term end	Minister(s)	Party
19 December 1894	28 April 1898	Edward Wittenoom	Ministerial
28 April 1898	27 May 1901	Henry Lefroy	Ministerial
27 May 1901	21 November 1901	Henry Gregory	Ministerial
21 November 1901	23 December 1901	Frank Wilson	Ministerial
23 December 1901	10 August 1904	Henry Gregory (again)	Ministerial
10 August 1904	7 June 1905	Robert Hastie	Labor
7 June 1905	25 August 1905	William Johnson	Labor
25 August 1905	7 October 1911	Henry Gregory (again)	Ministerial
7 October 1911	27 July 1916	Philip Collier	Labor
27 July 1916	28 June 1917	Robert Robinson	Liberal
28 June 1917	27 July 1917	John Scaddan	National Labor
27 July 1917	17 April 1919	Charles Hudson	National Labor
17 April 1919	21 June 1919	Robert Robinson (again)	Nationalist
25 June 1919	22 March 1924	John Scaddan (again)	Country
16 April 1924	30 April 1927	Frank Troy	Labor
30 April 1927	23 April 1930	Selby Munsie	Labor
23 April 1930	24 April 1933	John Scaddan (again)	Nationalist
24 April 1933	12 March 1938	Selby Munsie (again)	Labor
12 July 1938	3 August 1945	Alexander Panton	Labor
3 August 1945	1 April 1947	William Marshall	Labor
1 April 1947	5 January 1948	Lindsay Thorn	Country
5 January 1948	6 April 1950	Hubert Parker	Liberal
6 April 1950	23 February 1953	Charles Simpson	Liberal
23 February 1953	19 December 1957	Lionel Kelly	Labor
19 December 1957	2 April 1959	Arthur Moir	Labor
2 April 1959	3 March 1971	Arthur Griffith	Liberal
3 March 1971	8 April 1974	Don May	Labor
8 April 1974	5 March 1980	Andrew Mensaros	Liberal
5 March 1980	25 February 1983	Peter Jones	National Country
25 February 1983	23 December 1983	Peter Dowding	Labor
23 December 1983	25 February 1988	David Parker	Labor
25 February 1988	5 February 1991	Jeff Carr	Labor
5 February 1991	16 February 1993	Gordon Hill	Labor
16 February 1993	26 April 1996	George Cash	Liberal
26 April 1996	9 January 1997	Kevin Minson	Liberal
9 January 1997	16 February 2001	Norman Moore	Liberal
2001–06: no minister – responsibilities held by the Minister for State Development
3 February 2006	13 December 2006	John Bowler	Labor
13 December 2006	23 September 2008	Fran Logan	Labor
23 September 2008	21 March 2013	Norman Moore (again)	Liberal
21 March 2013	31 March 2016	Bill Marmion	Liberal
31 March 2016	17 March 2017	Sean L'Estrange	Liberal
17 March 2017		Bill Johnston	Labor

== See also ==
- Minister for Energy (Western Australia)
- Minister for Regional Development (Western Australia)
- Minister for State Development (Western Australia)
