= Carmen Lawrence =

Australian politician and academic (born 1948)

The Honourable Carmen Lawrence AO
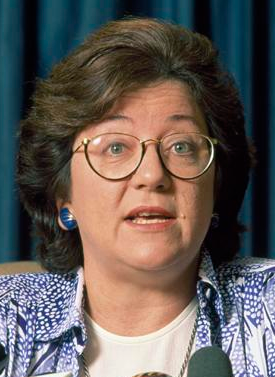
- Lawrence in 1990

25th Premier of Western Australia
- In office 12 February 1990 – 16 February 1993
- Monarch: Elizabeth II
- Governor: Sir Francis Burt
- Deputy: Ian Taylor
- Preceded by: Peter Dowding
- Succeeded by: Richard Court

Minister for Health and Human Services
- In office 25 March 1994 – 11 March 1996
- Prime Minister: Paul Keating
- Preceded by: Graham Richardson
- Succeeded by: Michael Wooldridge

Minister for Women
- In office 25 March 1994 – 11 March 1996
- Prime Minister: Paul Keating
- Preceded by: Ros Kelly
- Succeeded by: Jocelyn Newman

Member of the Australian Parliament for Fremantle
- In office 12 March 1994 – 17 October 2007
- Preceded by: John Dawkins
- Succeeded by: Melissa Parke

Member of the Western Australian Legislative Assembly for Glendalough
- In office 4 February 1989 – 4 February 1994
- Preceded by: Constituency Created
- Succeeded by: Michelle Roberts

Member of the Western Australian Legislative Assembly for Subiaco
- In office 8 February 1986 – 4 February 1989
- Preceded by: Tom Dadour
- Succeeded by: Constituency Abolished

Personal details
- Born: Carmen Mary Lawrence; 2 March 1948 (age 78) Northam, Western Australia, Australia
- Party: Labor
- Profession: Psychologist
- Lawrence's voice recorded September 2018

Carmen Mary Lawrence AO (born 2 March 1948) is an Australian academic and former politician who was the premier of Western Australia from 1990 to 1993, the first woman to become the premier of an Australian state. To date she is the only female premier of Western Australia. A member of the Labor Party, she later entered federal politics as a member of the House of Representatives from 1994 to 2007, and served as a minister in the Keating government.

Lawrence was born in Northam, Western Australia. She studied psychology at the University of Western Australia, obtaining a doctorate in 1983, and before entering politics worked as a lecturer and researcher. Lawrence was elected to state parliament in 1986, and became a government minister in 1988. She replaced Peter Dowding as premier in 1990, as Australia's second female head of government (after ACT Chief Minister Rosemary Follett) and first female state premier. She and the Labor Party lost power at the 1993 state election.

In 1994, Lawrence entered federal parliament through a by-election for the Division of Fremantle. She was almost immediately appointed to cabinet by Paul Keating, serving as Minister for Human Services and Health and Minister for Women until the government's defeat in 1996. Lawrence remained in parliament until the 2007 election, on the frontbench until 2002 and then as a backbencher. From 2004 to 2005, she was federal president of the Labor Party, the first person to be directly elected to the position. She returned to academia after leaving politics, as a psychology professor at the University of Western Australia.

== Early life ==
Lawrence was born in Northam, in the agricultural district of Western Australia and spent her early childhood in the towns of Gutha and Dongara.

She was one of seven children, six girls and a boy, born to Ernest Richard Lawrence, a farmer, and his wife Mary Norma (née Watson).

From the age of six she was educated at various Roman Catholic boarding schools: Marian Convent at Morawa; Dominican Ladies College at Dongara and Santa Maria College at Attadale from which she matriculated in 1964 with distinctions in six subjects, a General Exhibition for Academic Achievement and the Special Subject Exhibition in economics.

== Further education and employment ==
In 1965, Lawrence enrolled at the University of Western Australia in Perth. In 1968 she graduated as a Bachelor of Psychology with First Class Honours, having won five prizes including that for the most outstanding graduate throughout the Faculties of Arts, Economics and Commerce, Law, Architecture and Education. In 1968 she was Senior Student in Saint Catherine's residential college.

She was politically active from an early stage. While at UWA she lobbied, successfully, to have the Campus Beauty Contest abolished. In Melbourne in the early 1970s she helped to found the Victorian Branch of the Women's Electoral Lobby.

She tutored at the University of Melbourne in 1971 and 1972, tutored and lectured at the Western Australian Institute of Technology (WAIT) from 1973 to 1978 and was a lecturer with the Faculty of Medicine at the University of Western Australia from 1979 until 1983. During this period she continued with post-graduate research, having won two scholarships for PhD studies in psychology, and received the doctoral degree in 1983, for her dissertation Maternal Responses to Infant Crying.

From 1983 until her election to parliament in 1986, Lawrence was employed in the Research and Evaluation Unit of the Psychiatric Services Branch of the Department of Health of Western Australia.

== State political career ==
=== Entry to state parliament ===
During this period, Lawrence joined the Labor Party. She unsuccessfully contested the seat of East Melville at the 1983 election against sitting Liberal Party member Anthony Trethowan, but was more successful in 1986 when she won the seat of Subiaco following the retirement of long-serving Liberal-turned-independent Tom Dadour. In 1988, following the sudden departure of Brian Burke as Premier, she was appointed Minister for Education. At the 1989 election, her seat of Subiaco was abolished in a redistribution, and she won the new seat of Glendalough.

The Western Australian Labor government was in a state of crisis as a result of corruption allegations against the cabinets of two successive premiers, Brian Burke and Peter Dowding, the so-called "WA Inc" period.

=== Premier of Western Australia ===
In February 1990, Dowding was forced by his colleagues to resign. Lawrence, a prominent opponent within the Labor Party of Brian Burke's Right faction, of which Dowding was a member, replaced him as Premier on 12 February 1990, with Ian Taylor as her deputy.

Lawrence was the first female Premier of an Australian State. However, she was not the first female head of government of a province of the Commonwealth of Australia; being preceded by Rosemary Follett, who became Chief Minister of the ACT on 11 May 1989.

On 19 November 1990, Lawrence called a Royal Commission into matters related to the WA Inc deals, after considerable public and media pressure. The commission hearings began on 12 March 1991, and within months, the Labor party became a minority government as three left-wing MPs left the party to sit as independents. Coverage of the commission hearings dominated media headlines for most of the period from then until the 1993 election.

==== Juvenile crime ====
Between mid-1990 and early 1992, several high-speed chases involving cars stolen by repeat juvenile offenders resulted in the deaths of 10 people, including a businessman and several young parents. All received considerable media attention, most notably from 6PR's Howard Sattler. On 25 December 1991, 22-year-old Margaret Blurton and her infant son Shane were killed in a crash involving Kingsley Arnold Pickett, a 14-year-old Aboriginal offender in a stolen motor vehicle. Margaret's husband Peter survived, and gained public sympathy through bedside interviews to print and electronic media. A candlelight vigil was organised outside Parliament House on 4 January 1992, and exactly a month later, responding directly to the public call for action, Lawrence and deputy leader Ian Taylor tabled the Crime (Serious and Repeat Offenders) Sentencing Bill 1992, which was rushed through parliament despite the advice of a committee that it was "unworkable and unsustainable". Peter Blurton established the Margaret and Shane Foundation to channel both his own grief and the immense public sympathy into a workforce to fight for the rights of crime victims. The law, however, turned out to be defective and Lawrence later declared it to have been a mistake. The Act was repealed in June 1994.

==== Transport infrastructure ====
The other matter which preoccupied the Government was the ongoing construction of the Northern Suburbs Transit System, later to be known as the Joondalup line, which proceeded throughout Lawrence's term as Premier. She officially opened the line on 20 December 1992, with three stations on the line opening initially. On 21 March 1993, the other stations opened. The Perth City Busport (now known as Elizabeth Quay Bus Station) was opened on 30 November 1991 to centralise services travelling through the central business district.

=== Election defeat ===
In the election held on 6 February 1993, the Lawrence government was defeated by the Liberal-National coalition and Richard Court, who had replaced Barry MacKinnon as opposition leader just a year earlier, became Premier. Lawrence remained as Opposition Leader until early 1994.

In December 1993, Lawrence, Jim McGinty and Geoff Gallop joined in a petition to the High Court of Australia to challenge the franchise system for the Western Australian Legislative Council. The system of vote-weighting tended to favour the conservative parties and was a long-term obstacle to the ALP gaining control of the council. On 20 February 1996, the High Court rejected the challenge on the basis that the law was not unconstitutional.

== Federal political career ==
=== Entry to Federal Parliament and Cabinet Ministry ===
On 12 March 1994, following the resignation of former Federal treasurer and member for Fremantle, John Dawkins, she won a by-election for the seat and entered federal politics. Fremantle is a safe Labor seat which had once been held by Labor Prime Minister John Curtin, and later, Whitlam-era Education Minister Kim Beazley senior.

On 25 March 1994, she was appointed Minister for Human Services and Health and Minister assisting the Prime Minister for the Status of Women in the Keating government.

==== The Royal Commission ====
In May 1995, Premier Court requested the establishment of a Royal Commission to determine the circumstances of the tabling of the Easton affair petition. On 14 November 1995, the Royal Commission released a report which found that Lawrence had misled the Western Australian Parliament concerning her knowledge of and role in the tabling of the petition. Paul Keating denounced the commission as a political stunt and accused the Commissioner, Kenneth Marks QC, of bias.

At the 1996 federal election, the Keating government lost office and, following Paul Keating's resignation of the leadership, Kim Beazley, a Western Australian, became the new Leader of the Opposition.

Lawrence was appointed to the Opposition frontbench as Shadow Environment Minister. On 21 February 1997, she was charged with three counts of perjury resulting from the findings of the Marks Royal Commission. She stood down from the shadow ministry pending her trial. She was acquitted on 23 July 1999.

==== Later political life ====
In September 2000 Beazley approved her reappointment to the Labor frontbench, and appointed her shadow minister for Aboriginal and Torres Strait Islander Affairs, the Arts and Status of Women. She was inducted onto the Victorian Honour Roll of Women in 2001.

During the 2001 federal election campaign, Lawrence strongly disapproved of Beazley's support for the government's policy of detaining asylum-seekers (see Tampa affair). In December 2002 she resigned from the Shadow Cabinet, describing the party's policies on asylum and immigration as "brutal and inhumane".

She announced on 29 March 2007 that she would not recontest her seat in the Parliament at the 2007 Australian federal election.

=== Presidency of the ALP ===
During 2002 the Labor Party approved a series of reforms proposed by new Opposition leader Simon Crean, among them the direct election of the party's National President by the party membership (the post had previously been filled by election at the party's National Conference) and a reduction of the unions' representation at party conferences from 60% to 50%. Lawrence emerged as the candidate of the party's Left faction for the post, and the election took place in November 2003. Although she did not win an absolute majority of the votes, Lawrence topped the poll and was elected president, taking office on 1 January 2004, shortly after Mark Latham succeeded Crean as party Leader. She used the position to campaign in favour of a policy of better treatment for asylum-seekers entering Australia. Her term as National President ended on 1 January 2005, when she was succeeded by Barry Jones.

=== After Parliament ===
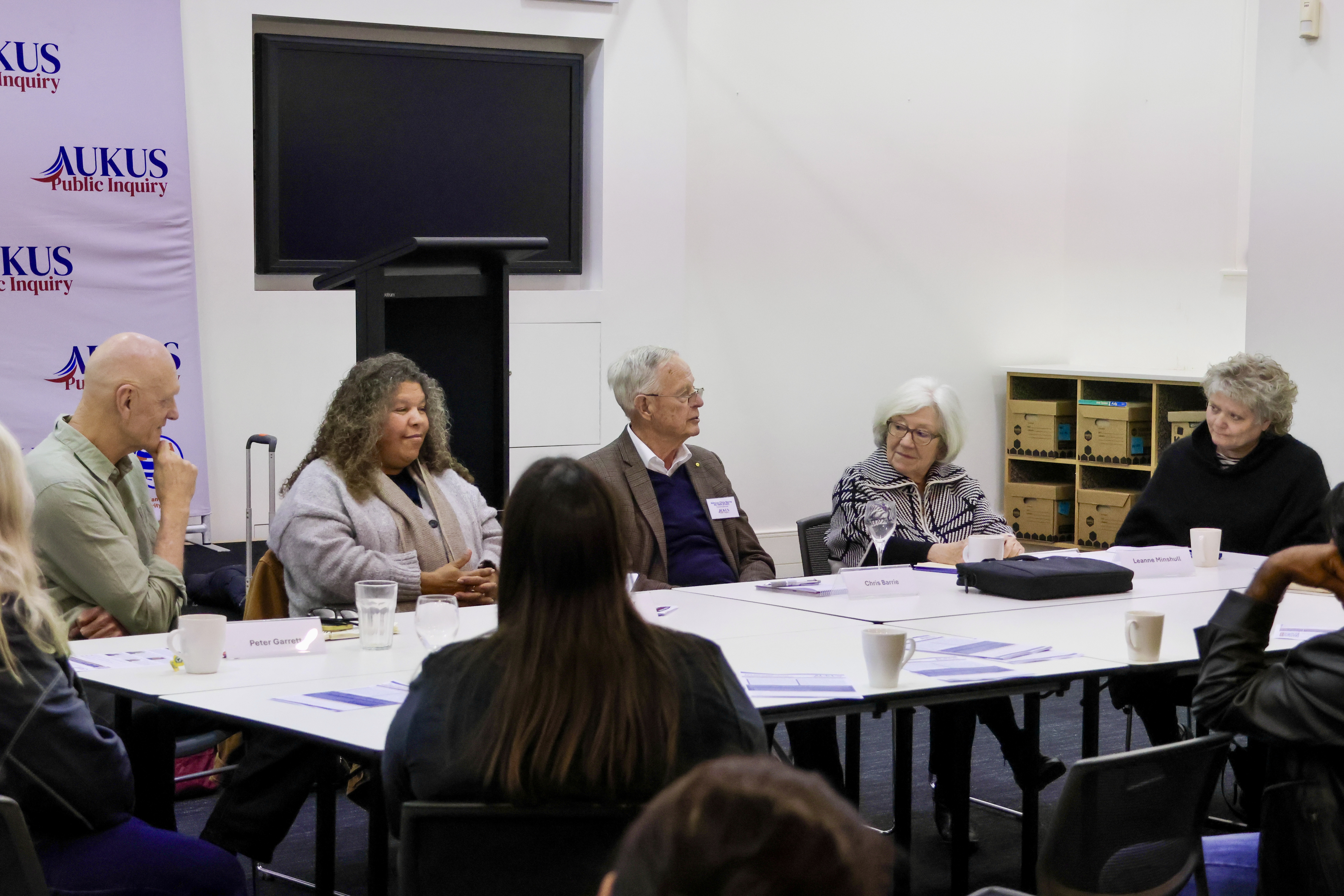
Lawrence (second from the right) and other commissioners at the 2026 AUKUS Public Inquiry in Adelaide

As foreshadowed in her announcement of March 2007, Lawrence did not contest the federal election held on 24 November 2007, thereby retiring from Parliament. She was succeeded as Member for Fremantle by Melissa Parke, also of the ALP.

Following her departure from the federal Parliament, Lawrence was engaged for a term, in 2008, as a Professorial Fellow at the University of Western Australia. Her brief was to conduct collaborative research with a focus on the origins of fanaticism and extreme behaviour, including terrorism, under the auspices of the university's Institute of Advanced Studies.

In 2016 Lawrence became president of the Conservation Council of Western Australia, and has campaigned against continuing sponsorship of major sporting clubs by companies involved in fossil fuel extraction.

In 2022, Lawrence was appointed Officer of the Order of Australia in the 2022 Queen's Birthday Honours for "distinguished service to the people and Parliaments of Australia and Western Australia, to conservation, and to arts administration".

== Notable public appearances and other engagements ==
- Lawrence delivered the John Curtin Memorial Lecture in 1994, speaking on the theme Women and Labor – A Future Perspective.
- On 24 November 1994, Lawrence delivered a lecture at Curtin University titled, "My Invalid Carrot is the Prettiest of Them All" as part of the Elizabeth Jolley Lecture Series.
- In 1995/96 Lawrence was named "Number One Ticket-Holder" for the Fremantle Football Club.
- In 2002, in her capacity as Shadow Minister for the Status of Women, Lawrence took part in the Canberra launch of the National Maternity Action Plan.
- From 2000 to 2004, she was a contributor to the Internet journal Online Opinion.
- From 2002 to 2005, she was an intermittent contributor to Margo Kingston's Webdiary.
- In 2005 she spoke in the Eminent Lecturer Series for the Herbert and Valmae Freilich Foundation which is hosted by the Australian National University. Her lectures on the theme Fear and Public Policy have since been published as a book titled Fear and Politics (listed in the Publications section, below).
- On 19 February 2007, Lawrence was the principal guest at the launch of the web publication The federal electorate of Fremantle: A history since 1901, an initiative of the John Curtin Prime Ministerial Library.
- 2012 Reid Oration - Maintaining a civil society: The importance of equality and education The Reid Oration is a collaboration between the WA Institute of Public Administration Australia and The University of Western Australia.
- Lawrence was awarded the 2015 Australian Humanist of the Year for her consistent humanist approach to a wide range of issues, both as politician and researcher, and for speaking out on matters of concern to humanists including the welfare of Indigenous people, equality for women, inequality in education and Australia's treatment of asylum seekers.

== Bibliography ==
=== Books ===
- Lawrence, Carmen (2006). Fear and Politics (Pbk). Melbourne: Scribe Publications. ISBN 978-1-920769-87-1.

=== Essays, reporting and other contributions ===
- Lawrence, Carmen (2000). "The gender gap in political behaviour". In Kate Deverall (ed.). Party Girls – Labor Women Now (Pbk). Rebecca Huntley, Penny Sharpe, Jo Tilly. Sydney: Pluto Press Australia. ISBN 1-86403-117-4.
- Lawrence, Carmen (2005). "Fear of the 'Other' and Public Policy". In Jo Coghlan (ed.). Seeking Refuge (Pbk). John Minns and Andrew Wells. Wollongong: University of Wollongong Press. ISBN 1-920831-50-9.
- Lawrence, Carmen (2006). "Political Corporations". In Barry Jones (ed.). Coming to the Party: where to next for Labor? (Pbk). Melbourne: Melbourne University Press. ISBN 978-0-522-85283-7.
- "We are destroying the joint", pp. 70–86, in: Destroying the joint, edited by Jane Caro, Read How You Want (2015, ISBN 9781459687295).

=== Book reviews ===
| Year | Review article | Work(s) reviewed |
|---|---|---|
| 2009 | Lawrence, Carmen (Autumn 2009). "There's something about Gough (2)". Overland. 194: 82–83. | Hocking, Jenny. Gough Whitlam : a moment in history. Melbourne: Miegunyah Press. |

== See also ==
- Lawrence Ministry
- List of female heads of government in Australia

Parliament of Australia
| Preceded by John Dawkins | Member of Parliament for Fremantle; 1994–2007 | Succeeded by Melissa Parke |
Political offices
| Preceded by Peter Dowding | Premier of Western Australia; 1990–1993 | Succeeded by Richard Court |
| Preceded by Graham Richardson | Minister for Health and Human Services; 1994–1996 | Succeeded by Michael Wooldridge |
| Preceded by Ros Kelly | Minister for Women; 1994–1996 | Succeeded by Jocelyn Newman |
