= Ian Taylor (Australian politician) =

Australian politician

Deputy Premier of Western Australia
- In office 13 February 1990 – 16 February 1993
- Premier: Carmen Lawrence
- Preceded by: David Parker
- Succeeded by: Hendy Cowan

Leader of the Opposition
- In office 7 February 1994 – 12 October 1994
- Premier: Richard Court
- Preceded by: Carmen Lawrence
- Succeeded by: Jim McGinty

Member of the Western Australian Parliament for Kalgoorlie
- In office 20 June 1981 – 1996
- Preceded by: Ted Evans
- Succeeded by: Megan Anwyl

Personal details
- Born: Ian Frederick Taylor; 15 March 1949 (age 77)
- Party: Labor

Ian Frederick Taylor (born 15 March 1949) is a former Australian politician and Western Australian Deputy Premier and Opposition Leader. He represented the seat of Kalgoorlie in the Western Australian Legislative Assembly from 1981 to 1996, and was deputy premier under Carmen Lawrence from 1990 to 1993.

== Political career ==
Taylor was elected to the Western Australian Legislative Assembly in 1981 as the Labor Party (ALP) member for Kalgoorlie. He won the seat at a by-election on 20 June 1981, which had been called following the death of the sitting member, Ted Evans, and went on to hold it for fifteen years. In 1986, he was appointed Minister for Health and also held the Aged Care, Lands and Consumer Affairs portfolios at various times. Following Brian Burke's resignation in 1988, he became Minister for Police in Peter Dowding's ministry, and on Carmen Lawrence's ascension to the premiership in 1990 he became Deputy Premier and Minister for Finance (although his portfolio varied during this time) corresponding to Premier Lawrence also being the Treasurer.

== Leader of the Opposition ==
Labor was defeated at the 1993 state election and Taylor became Leader of the Opposition in February 1994 when Lawrence resigned to enter federal parliament. In July 1994, he appeared as a character witness at the trial of Burke, who was convicted of defrauding the state over travel expense claims arising from his time as premier. Taylor stood down after eight months in the position. He was succeeded by Jim McGinty in October.

== Later Life ==
In 1996 he resigned to contest the federal seat of Kalgoorlie against Labor rebel Graeme Campbell, who defeated him as an independent. Campbell, the sitting member, had left the ALP and recontested the seat at the March 1996 election, where he narrowly outpolled Taylor on first preferences before winning comfortably on the distribution of Liberal preferences. Taylor's resignation from the Legislative Assembly triggered a by-election for his state seat, held on 16 March 1996, at which Labor's Megan Anwyl retained Kalgoorlie for the party. He was only the second WA Labor leader, and the first in over 90 years, not to take the party into an election.

In 2000, Taylor announced his intention to leave the ALP over the treatment of former Labor politician Larry Graham.

He was expelled from the party in 2008 after endorsing the independent candidacy of his close friend John Bowler, a former Labor minister, in Kalgoorlie at that year's state election, saying that his friendship with Bowler came before the party. Ahead of the 2017 state election, Taylor returned to campaign for Labor in Kalgoorlie for the first time since his expulsion, saying he held no grudges over the decision.

== See also ==
- 1990 Australian Labor Party (Western Australian Branch) leadership spill
