= Julian Grill =

Australian politician

The Honourable Julian Grill

Minister for Transport, Regional Development, and the North-West with special responsibility for Bunbury 2000
- In office 25 February 1983 – 26 February 1986

Minister for Agriculture, The South-West, Fisheries, Transport
- In office 26 February 1986 – 12 May 1986

Minister for the North-West
- In office 26 February 1986 – 25 July 1986

Minister assisting the Minister for Economic Development and Trade
- In office 7 June 1988 – 28 February 1989

Minister for Economic Development and Trade, and Tourism
- In office 28 February 1989 – 12 February 1990

Member of the Western Australian Legislative Assembly for Eyre Yilgarn-Dundas (1977–1983) Esperance-Dundas (1983–1989)
- In office 4 February 1989 – 10 February 2001
- Preceded by: New creation
- Succeeded by: John Bowler

Personal details
- Born: Julian Fletcher Grill; 15 May 1940 (age 86) Sydney, New South Wales, Australia
- Party: Labor Party (?–2007)
- Profession: Lobbyist, barrister, solicitor & politician

Julian Fletcher Grill (born 15 May 1940) is an Australian former politician. Grill was a member of the Parliament of Western Australia between 1977 and 2001.

== Early life and education ==
Grill was born in Sydney and was brought up in Broken Hill, Collie and Subiaco. He attended Perth Modern School and the University of Western Australia from where he graduated with a Bachelor of Laws.

== Legal career ==
Grill was admitted to the Western Australian Bar of the Supreme Court of Western Australia in 1966. A partner of Henshaw, Wheeldon and Grill, Evans and Grill, and Grill Browne and Co, he specialised in mining and resources law.

== Parliamentary career ==
Grill was elected as the Member for Yilgarn-Dundas in Western Australia's Lower House in 1977. Due to redistributions the seat changed a number of times, initially becoming Esperance-Dundas and eventually Eyre. He was re-elected in subsequent elections, and was promoted to the front bench in 1981. Grill became Minister for Transport in the First Burke Ministry in 1983. He later served in the Agriculture, Fisheries, the North West, Regional Development, Economic Development, Trade and Tourism portfolios. He retired from politics in 2001 and did not contest the 2001 election.

As a politician, Grill commenced planning for metropolitan rail expansion and electrification, re-establishing the Perth to Fremantle rail service, led the legislative process to abolish capital punishment, led streamlining the rail freight services to cut out overmanning, initiated rail rejuvenation in the Perth metropolitan area, began the process of selling WA education in Asia, with colleagues conceived and instituted the Bunbury 2000 programme, executed the state's largest regional renewal project, wrote the energy policy adopted by the Gallop government, superintended the state's first substantial marine national parks and reserves, led conception and delivery of the Hillarys Boat Harbour development, was a member of the team that established the Dawesville Channel, led trade delegations to India, China and Hong Kong, secured substantial funding for community projects in Collie, discontinued the Fitzgerald National Park land release programme, facilitated the government's commitment to the Collie Power Station, facilitated the commitment of Griffin Coal to the Bluewaters Power Station, and helped convince Worsley (BHP) to embrace coal in its recent major expansions.

== Post-parliamentary career ==
As a lobbyist Grill contributed directly to breaking the Pilbara iron-ore duopoly (BHP and Rio Tinto) helping to open the way for Fortescue and others. He also helped secure compensation for victims of the mortgage brokers scandal in Western Australia and played a key role in advancing several major projects, many of which generated significant employment in Western Australia.

In 2007 Grill was expelled from the Australian Labor Party over a donation he facilitated on behalf of a client to the Western Australian National Party during the 2004/05 financial year. Later in 2007, he was held in contempt of parliament and ordered to publicly apologise to the Legislative Assembly for leaking a draft parliamentary committee report to Precious Metals Australia in 2006 after receiving it from longtime friend and former Labor minister John Bowler. The following year, he was ordered to apologise in writing to the Western Australian Legislative Council for giving Burke documents from an inquiry into the iron ore industry. However, he refused to do so, putting him at risk of being jailed for contempt of parliament, though the Upper House ultimately opted against jailing him.

Grill was investigated by the Corruption & Crime Commission of Western Australia and was charged. He was subsequently found not guilty of all charges.

In 2014 Grill was involved in business providing specialist expertise in negotiation, business acquisitions, property development and general management.

Grill has been chairman or a non-executive director of Australian Securities Exchange-listed companies Asia Oil and Minerals, Kalgoorlie Boulder Resources, Regal Resources, and Focus Resources. He was the principal of Julian Grill Consulting and is the principal of Julian Grill Advisory.

His interests include agriculture, resources, civil rights and the Goldfields of Western Australia.
