= Electoral results for the district of Kalgoorlie =

Western Australian district election results

This is a list of electoral results for the electoral district of Kalgoorlie in Western Australian state elections.

== Members for Kalgoorlie ==
Member	Party	Term
William Johnson	Labour	1901–1905
Norbert Keenan	Ministerial	1905–1911
Albert Green	Labor	1911–1913
George McLeod	Labor	1914
Albert Green	Labor	1914–1921
John Boyland	Ind. Nationalist	1921–1922
James Cunningham	Labor	1923–1936
Herbert Styants	Labor	1936–1956
Tom Evans	Labor	1956–1980
Ted Evans	Labor	1980–1981
Ian Taylor	Labor	1981–1996
Megan Anwyl	Labor	1996–2001
Matt Birney	Liberal	2001–2008
John Bowler	Independent	2008–2013
Wendy Duncan	National	2013–2017
Kyran O'Donnell	Liberal	2017–2021
Ali Kent	Labor	2021–present

== Election results ==
=== Elections in the 2020s ===
2025 Western Australian state election: Kalgoorlie
Party	Candidate	Votes	%	±%
Labor	Ali Kent	5,110	34.4	−17.6
Liberal	Rowena Olsen	3,081	20.7	−3.9
National	Tony Herron	2,277	15.3	+3.4
Independent	Kyran O'Donnell	1,931	13.0	+13.0
Legalise Cannabis	Kelly Malcolm	706	4.7	+4.7
One Nation	Jordan Whitten	684	4.6	+1.0
Greens	Donald Shane Clarke	580	3.9	+1.7
Christians	Ross G. Patterson	307	2.1	+2.1
Shooters, Fishers, Farmers	Stefan Colagiuri	199	1.3	−1.8
Total formal votes		14,875	95.0	−1.1
Informal votes		787	5.0	+1.1
Turnout		15,662	71.9	−3.0
Two-party-preferred result
Labor	Ali Kent	7,655	51.6	−9.6
Liberal	Rowena Olsen	7,188	48.4	+9.6
Labor hold		Swing	−9.6	

Results are not final. Last updated on 26 March 2025 at 5:30 PM AWST

2021 Western Australian state election: Kalgoorlie
Party	Candidate	Votes	%	±%
Labor	Ali Kent	7,782	52.7	+26.6
Liberal	Kyran O'Donnell	3,695	25.0	−3.0
National	Rowena Olsen	1,608	10.9	−13.5
One Nation	Patrick Redreau	494	3.3	−8.8
Shooters, Fishers, Farmers	Jack Carmody	465	3.2	−0.9
Greens	Alex Wallace	328	2.2	−2.0
Liberal Democrats	Sam Rennie	217	1.5	+1.5
No Mandatory Vaccination	Enrico Piazza	140	0.9	+0.9
WAxit	Rustu Buyukcakar	31	0.2	+0.2
Total formal votes		14,760	96.2	+0.2
Informal votes		591	3.8	−0.2
Turnout		15,351	78.1	−2.6
Two-party-preferred result
Labor	Ali Kent	9,152	62.0	+18.2
Liberal	Kyran O'Donnell	5,601	38.0	−18.2
Labor gain from Liberal		Swing	+18.2	

=== Elections in the 2010s ===
2017 Western Australian state election: Kalgoorlie
Party	Candidate	Votes	%	±%
Liberal	Kyran O'Donnell	4,256	28.0	−10.6
Labor	Darren Forster	3,965	26.1	+6.9
National	Tony Crook	3,713	24.4	−10.3
One Nation	Richard Bolton	1,846	12.1	+12.1
Greens	Jacqueline Spurling	646	4.3	−1.0
Shooters, Fishers, Farmers	Mike Lucas	622	4.1	+4.1
Flux the System!	James Erwin	149	1.0	+1.0
Total formal votes		15,197	95.9	+1.9
Informal votes		649	4.1	−1.9
Turnout		15,846	79.1	−0.4
Two-party-preferred result
Liberal	Kyran O'Donnell	8,533	56.2	−10.3
Labor	Darren Forster	6,656	43.8	+10.3
Liberal gain from National		Swing	−10.3	

2013 Western Australian state election: Kalgoorlie
Party	Candidate	Votes	%	±%
Liberal	Melissa Price	3,748	37.3	+12.6
National	Wendy Duncan	3,717	37.0	+18.0
Labor	Terrence Winner	1,928	19.2	+1.6
Greens	Tim Hall	450	4.5	0.0
Christians	Ross Patterson	202	2.0	+2.0
Total formal votes		10,045	94.3	0.0
Informal votes		602	5.7	0.0
Turnout		10,647	80.7	
Two-party-preferred result
Liberal	Melissa Price	6,715	66.9	+7.1
Labor	Terrence Winner	3,324	33.1	–7.1
Two-candidate-preferred result
National	Wendy Duncan	5,651	56.3	+9.8
Liberal	Melissa Price	4,379	43.7	+43.7
National gain from Independent		Swing	+16.1	

=== Elections in the 2000s ===
2008 Western Australian state election: Kalgoorlie
Party	Candidate	Votes	%	±%
Independent	John Bowler	3,466	34.0	+34.0
Liberal	Nat James	2,540	24.9	−26.0
National	Tony Crook	1,942	19.0	+19.0
Labor	Mathew Cuomo	1,790	17.6	−19.6
Greens	Andy Huntley	461	4.5	+0.2
Total formal votes		10,199	94.4	−1.5
Informal votes		605	5.6	+1.5
Turnout		10,804	76.4	
Two-candidate-preferred result
Independent	John Bowler	5,462	53.6	+53.6
National	Tony Crook	4,731	46.4	+46.4
Independent gain from Liberal		Swing	N/A	

2005 Western Australian state election: Kalgoorlie
Party	Candidate	Votes	%	±%
Liberal	Matt Birney	5,579	53.1	+14.5
Labor	James Donnelly	3,629	34.6	−4.4
Greens	Peter Gurger	434	4.1	+0.4
Independent	Leigh Varis Beswick	424	4.0	+4.0
One Nation	Robin Scott	228	2.2	−8.4
Christian Democrats	Gregory Smart	205	2.0	+2.0
Total formal votes		10,499	95.9	0.0
Informal votes		448	4.1	0.0
Turnout		10,947	85.3	
Two-party-preferred result
Liberal	Matt Birney	6,260	59.6	+8.6
Labor	James Donnelly	4,236	40.4	−8.6
Liberal hold		Swing	+8.6	

2001 Western Australian state election: Kalgoorlie
Party	Candidate	Votes	%	±%
Labor	Megan Anwyl	4,168	38.9	−7.8
Liberal	Matt Birney	4,160	38.8	+6.6
One Nation	Guy Hopkins	1,122	10.5	+10.5
Greens	Deborah Botica	401	3.7	+3.7
Independent	Duncan Griffin	392	3.7	+3.7
Independent	Don Green	332	3.1	+3.1
Curtin Labor Alliance	Ian Burt	138	1.3	+1.3
Total formal votes		10,713	95.9	−0.7
Informal votes		455	4.1	+0.7
Turnout		11,168	86.0	
Two-party-preferred result
Liberal	Matt Birney	5,447	51.1	+5.5
Labor	Megan Anwyl	5,205	48.9	−5.5
Liberal gain from Labor		Swing	+5.5	

=== Elections in the 1990s ===
1996 Western Australian state election: Kalgoorlie
Party	Candidate	Votes	%	±%
Labor	Megan Anwyl	4,985	46.7	−5.9
Liberal	Karen McGay	3,435	32.2	−2.6
National	Doug Daws	1,349	12.6	+12.6
Independent	Darby Renton	898	8.4	+8.4
Total formal votes		10,667	96.7	+0.3
Informal votes		369	3.3	−0.3
Turnout		11,036	86.5	
Two-party-preferred result
Labor	Megan Anwyl	5,793	54.4	−3.2
Liberal	Karen McGay	4,859	45.6	+3.2
Labor hold		Swing	−3.2	

1996 Kalgoorlie state by-election
Party	Candidate	Votes	%	±%
Labor	Megan Anwyl	4,223	45.5	−7.2
Liberal	Karen McGay	3,550	38.2	+3.5
Independent	Darby Renton	665	7.2	+7.2
Independent	Raymond Delbridge	378	4.1	+4.1
Greens	Richard McMahon	282	3.0	+3.0
Democrats	David Thackrah	158	1.7	+1.7
	David Churches	33	0.4	+0.4
Total formal votes		9,289	97.0	+0.7
Informal votes		283	3.0	−0.7
Turnout		9,572	84.3	−8.8
Two-party-preferred result
Labor	Megan Anwyl	5,055	54.4	−3.3
Liberal	Karen McGay	4,234	45.6	+3.3
Labor hold		Swing	−3.3	

1993 Western Australian state election: Kalgoorlie
Party	Candidate	Votes	%	±%
Labor	Ian Taylor	5,054	52.7	−6.5
Liberal	Gary Boyle	3,328	34.7	+1.6
Independent	Margaret Jones	1,209	12.6	+12.6
Total formal votes		9,591	96.3	+2.4
Informal votes		365	3.7	−2.4
Turnout		9,956	93.1	+3.8
Two-party-preferred result
Labor	Ian Taylor	5,532	57.7	−3.7
Liberal	Gary Boyle	4,059	42.3	+3.7
Labor hold		Swing	−3.7	

=== Elections in the 1980s ===
1989 Western Australian state election: Kalgoorlie
Party	Candidate	Votes	%	±%
Labor	Ian Taylor	5,224	59.2	−18.1
Liberal	Douglas Bowie	2,918	33.1	+10.4
Independent	John Burt	378	4.3	+4.3
Independent	Peter Girando	298	3.4	+3.4
Total formal votes		8,818	93.9	
Informal votes		569	6.1	
Turnout		9,387	89.3	
Two-party-preferred result
Labor	Ian Taylor	5,414	61.4	−15.9
Liberal	Douglas Bowie	3,404	38.6	+15.9
Labor hold		Swing	−15.9	

1986 Western Australian state election: Kalgoorlie
Party	Candidate	Votes	%	±%
Labor	Ian Taylor	7,743	80.1	+8.5
Independent	Stephanie Farrell	1,927	19.9	+19.9
Total formal votes		9,670	96.6	0.0
Informal votes		341	3.4	0.0
Turnout		10,011	89.5	−1.2
Labor hold		Swing	+6.0	

1983 Western Australian state election: Kalgoorlie
Party	Candidate	Votes	%	±%
Labor	Ian Taylor	5,735	71.6	
Liberal	Ross Lightfoot	1,871	23.3	
Independent	Maxine Cable	408	5.1	
Total formal votes		8,014	96.6	
Informal votes		279	3.4	
Turnout		8,293	90.7	
Two-party-preferred result
Labor	Ian Taylor	5,938	74.1	
Liberal	Ross Lightfoot	2,076	25.9	
Labor hold		Swing		

1981 Kalgoorlie state by-election
Party	Candidate	Votes	%	±%
Labor	Ian Taylor	4,158	70.9	+6.4
Liberal	Robert Moffat	1,703	29.1	−6.4
Total formal votes		5,861	98.7	+3.9
Informal votes		77	1.3	−3.9
Turnout		5,938	81.2	−4.9
Labor hold		Swing	+6.4	

1980 Western Australian state election: Kalgoorlie
Party	Candidate	Votes	%	±%
Labor	Ted Evans	4,109	64.5	+2.5
Liberal	Douglas Daws	2,264	35.5	+3.9
Total formal votes		6,373	94.8	−1.4
Informal votes		346	5.2	+1.4
Turnout		6,719	86.1	−3.0
Labor hold		Swing	+0.9	

=== Elections in the 1970s ===
1977 Western Australian state election: Kalgoorlie
Party	Candidate	Votes	%	±%
Labor	Tom Evans	4,184	62.0	
Liberal	Stuart Dunkley	2,132	31.6	
Progress	Graham Mills	434	6.4	
Total formal votes		6,750	96.2	
Informal votes		269	3.8	
Turnout		7,019	89.1	
Two-party-preferred result
Labor	Tom Evans	4,292	63.6	
Liberal	Stuart Dunkley	2,458	36.4	
Labor hold		Swing		

1974 Western Australian state election: Kalgoorlie
Party	Candidate	Votes	%	±%
Labor	Tom Evans	3,623	62.1	
Liberal	Max Finlayson	1,867	32.0	
National Alliance	Geoffrey Sands	346	5.9	
Total formal votes		5,836	92.8	
Informal votes		455	7.2	
Turnout		6,291	88.7	
Two-party-preferred result
Labor	Tom Evans	3,675	63.0	
Liberal	Max Finlayson	2,161	37.0	
Labor hold		Swing		

1971 Western Australian state election: Kalgoorlie
Party	Candidate	Votes	%	±%
Labor	Tom Evans	3,905	69.1	−30.9
Liberal	Ian Wedgewood	1,409	24.9	+24.9
Democratic Labor	Geoffrey Sands	336	6.0	+6.0
Total formal votes		5,650	97.5	
Informal votes		143	2.5	
Turnout		5,793	89.4	
Two-party-preferred result
Labor	Tom Evans	3,955	70.0	−30.0
Liberal	Ian Wedgewood	1,695	30.0	+30.0
Labor hold		Swing	N/A	

=== Elections in the 1960s ===
1968 Western Australian state election: Kalgoorlie
Party	Candidate	Votes	%	±%
Labor	Tom Evans	unopposed		
Labor hold		Swing		

1965 Western Australian state election: Kalgoorlie
Party	Candidate	Votes	%	±%
Labor	Tom Evans	unopposed		
Labor hold		Swing		

1962 Western Australian state election: Kalgoorlie
Party	Candidate	Votes	%	±%
Labor	Tom Evans	4,195	76.3	
Liberal and Country	Graham Jonas	1,303	23.7	
Total formal votes		5,498	99.1	
Informal votes		50	0.9	
Turnout		5,548	92.6	
Labor hold		Swing		

=== Elections in the 1950s ===
1959 Western Australian state election: Kalgoorlie
Party	Candidate	Votes	%	±%
Labor	Tom Evans	3,038	70.2	−0.3
Liberal and Country	Percy Millington	817	18.9	−10.6
Independent	Harold Illingworth	476	11.0	+11.0
Total formal votes		4,331	98.8	+0.6
Informal votes		52	1.2	−0.6
Turnout		4,383	92.5	−0.3
Two-party-preferred result
Labor	Tom Evans		75.6	+5.1
Liberal and Country	Percy Millington		24.4	−5.1
Labor hold		Swing	+5.1	

- Two party preferred vote was estimated.

1956 Western Australian state election: Kalgoorlie
Party	Candidate	Votes	%	±%
Labor	Tom Evans	3,052	70.5	
Liberal and Country	George Brand	1,276	29.5	
Total formal votes		4,328	98.2	
Informal votes		78	1.8	
Turnout		4,406	92.8	
Labor hold		Swing		

1953 Western Australian state election: Kalgoorlie
Party	Candidate	Votes	%	±%
Labor	Herbert Styants	unopposed		
Labor hold		Swing		

1950 Western Australian state election: Kalgoorlie
Party	Candidate	Votes	%	±%
Labor	Herbert Styants	2,513	67.0	
Liberal and Country	Albert Rogers	1,239	33.0	
Total formal votes		3,752	98.1	
Informal votes		72	1.9	
Turnout		3,824	86.5	
Labor hold		Swing		

=== Elections in the 1940s ===
1947 Western Australian state election: Kalgoorlie
Party	Candidate	Votes	%	±%
Labor	Herbert Styants	unopposed		
Labor hold		Swing		

1943 Western Australian state election: Kalgoorlie
Party	Candidate	Votes	%	±%
Labor	Herbert Styants	unopposed		
Labor hold		Swing		

=== Elections in the 1930s ===
1939 Western Australian state election: Kalgoorlie
Party	Candidate	Votes	%	±%
Labor	Herbert Styants	2,676	66.0	+20.2
Nationalist	Harold Kingsbury	1,380	34.0	+34.0
Total formal votes		4,056	98.7	0.0
Informal votes		52	1.3	0.0
Turnout		4,108	92.8	+35.2
Labor hold		Swing	N/A	

1936 Western Australian state election: Kalgoorlie
Party	Candidate	Votes	%	±%
Labor	Herbert Styants	1,108	45.8	+45.8
Labor	James Cunningham	845	35.0	−30.2
Labor	Robert Elliott	465	19.2	+19.2
Total formal votes		2,418	98.7	+1.2
Informal votes		31	1.3	−1.2
Turnout		2,449	57.6	−31.8
Two-candidate-preferred result
Labor	Herbert Styants	1,356	56.1	
Labor	James Cunningham	1,062	43.9	
Labor hold		Swing	N/A	

1933 Western Australian state election: Kalgoorlie
Party	Candidate	Votes	%	±%
Labor	James Cunningham	1,937	65.2	−34.8
Nationalist	Ernest Williams	698	23.5	+23.5
Nationalist	Francis O'Dea	337	11.3	+11.3
Total formal votes		2,972	97.5	
Informal votes		77	2.5	
Turnout		3,049	89.4	
Labor hold		Swing	N/A	

- Preferences were not distributed.

1930 Western Australian state election: Kalgoorlie
Party	Candidate	Votes	%	±%
Labor	James Cunningham	unopposed		
Labor hold		Swing		

=== Elections in the 1920s ===
1927 Western Australian state election: Kalgoorlie
Party	Candidate	Votes	%	±%
Labor	James Cunningham	1,509	52.5	−10.2
Nationalist	George Rainsford	898	31.3	+31.3
Independent	James Cummins	466	16.2	+16.2
Total formal votes		2,873	98.7	−0.9
Informal votes		37	1.3	+0.9
Turnout		2,910	86.3	+21.5
Labor hold		Swing	N/A	

- Preferences were not distributed.

1924 Western Australian state election: Kalgoorlie
Party	Candidate	Votes	%	±%
Labor	James Cunningham	1,805	62.7	+16.5
Ind. Nationalist	Henry Raven	839	29.2	+29.2
National Labor	Charles Elliott	234	8.1	+3.2
Total formal votes		2,878	99.6	+0.3
Informal votes		11	0.4	−0.3
Turnout		2,889	64.8	−10.9
Labor hold		Swing	N/A	

1923 Kalgoorlie state by-election
Party	Candidate	Votes	%	±%
Labor	James Cunningham	1,231	49.0	+2.8
Goldfields Candidate	Henry Raven	734	29.2	+29.2
Independent	William Ross	380	15.1	+15.1
National Labor	William Schwan	166	6.6	+1.7
Total formal votes		2,511	99.6	+0.3
Informal votes		11	0.4	−0.3
Turnout		2,522	55.2	−20.5
Two-candidate-preferred result
Labor	James Cunningham	1,273	50.7	+3.7
Goldfields Candidate	Henry Raven	1,238	49.3	+49.3
Labor gain from Independent		Swing	N/A	

1921 Western Australian state election: Kalgoorlie
Party	Candidate	Votes	%	±%
Labor	Albert Green	1,597	46.2	−4.3
Ind. Nationalist	John Boyland	1,268	36.7	+36.7
Nationalist	Charles Cutbush	423	12.2	+12.2
National Labor	Walter Close	169	4.9	+4.9
Total formal votes		3,457	99.3	+0.8
Informal votes		25	0.7	−0.8
Turnout		3,482	75.7	+9.1
Two-candidate-preferred result
Ind. Nationalist	John Boyland	1,831	53.0	
Labor	Albert Green	1,626	47.0	
Ind. Nationalist gain from Labor		Swing	N/A	

=== Elections in the 1910s ===
1917 Western Australian state election: Kalgoorlie
Party	Candidate	Votes	%	±%
Labor	Albert Green	1,902	50.5	–49.5
Nationalist	Charles Heppingstone	734	19.5	+19.5
National Labor	Harold Seddon	626	16.6	+16.6
Nationalist	Henry Davidson	501	13.3	+13.3
Total formal votes		3,763	98.5	n/a
Informal votes		59	1.5	n/a
Turnout		3,822	66.6	n/a
Labor hold		Swing	–49.5	

1914 Western Australian state election: Kalgoorlie
Party	Candidate	Votes	%	±%
Labor	Albert Green	unopposed		
Labor hold		Swing		

1914 Kalgoorlie state by-election
Party	Candidate	Votes	%	±%
Labor	George McLeod	1,462	65.4	N/A
Liberal	John Boileau	772	34.6	+34.6
Total formal votes		2,236	99.7	
Informal votes		7	0.3	
Turnout		2,243	49.1	
Labor hold		Swing	N/A	

1911 Western Australian state election: Kalgoorlie
Party	Candidate	Votes	%	±%
Labor	Albert Green	2,510	86.6	
Independent	Mathias Richardson	389	13.4	
Total formal votes		2,899	99.2	
Informal votes		22	0.8	
Turnout		2,921	60.2	
Labor gain from Ministerialist		Swing		

=== Elections in the 1900s ===
1908 Western Australian state election: Kalgoorlie
Party	Candidate	Votes	%	±%
Ministerialist	Norbert Keenan	1,614	58.3	−2.6
Labour	George McLeod	1,153	41.7	+2.6
Total formal votes		2,767	99.6	+0.4
Informal votes		12	0.4	−0.4
Turnout		2,779	77.0	+4.1
Ministerialist hold		Swing	−2.6	

1905 Western Australian state election: Kalgoorlie
Party	Candidate	Votes	%	±%
Ind. Ministerialist	Norbert Keenan	1,629	60.9	+13.0
Labour	William Johnson	1,045	39.1	–13.0
Total formal votes		2,674	99.2	–0.4
Informal votes		21	0.8	+0.4
Turnout		2,695	72.9	+14.0
Ind. Ministerialist gain from Labour		Swing	+13.0	

1904 Western Australian state election: Kalgoorlie
Party	Candidate	Votes	%	±%
Labour	William Johnson	1,556	52.1	+14.4
Independent	Norbert Keenan	1,431	47.9	+47.9
Total formal votes		2,987	99.6	+7.1
Informal votes		12	0.4	–7.1
Turnout		3,004	58.9	+8.8
Labour hold		Swing	N/A	

1901 Western Australian state election: Kalgoorlie
Party	Candidate	Votes	%	±%
Labour	William Johnson	606	31.7	+31.7
Ministerialist	Charles Moran	506	26.5	+26.5
Opposition	William Burton	495	25.9	+25.9
Opposition	Alfred Shaw	301	15.7	+15.7
Independent	John Stuart	4	0.2	+0.2
Total formal votes		1,912	92.5	n/a
Informal votes		156	7.5	n/a
Turnout		2,068	50.1	n/a
Labour win		(new seat)		
