= Electoral results for the district of Roe =

Australian district election results

This is a list of electoral results for the Electoral district of Roe in Western Australian elections.

== Members for Roe ==
Roe (1950–1983)
Member	Party	Term
Charles Perkins	Country	1950–1962
Tom Hart	Country	1962–1967
Bill Young	Country	1967–1974
Geoff Grewar	Liberal	1974–1983
Roe (1989–2008)
Member	Party	Term
Ross Ainsworth	National	1989–2005
Graham Jacobs	Liberal	2005–2008
Roe (2017–present)
Peter Rundle	National	2017–present

== Election results ==
=== Elections in the 2020s ===
2025 Western Australian state election: Roe
Party	Candidate	Votes	%	±%
National	Peter Rundle	12,502	53.3	+10.2
Liberal	Marie O'Dea	4,047	17.3	+2.9
Labor	Brad Willis	3,014	12.9	−15.8
One Nation	Ethann Sinclair	1,985	8.5	+6.7
Greens	David John Worth	1,306	5.6	+1.9
Christians	Diana Reymond	596	2.5	+0.2
Total formal votes		23,450	96.3	+0.2
Informal votes		895	3.7	−0.2
Turnout		24,345	86.0	+1.4
Two-candidate-preferred result
National	Peter Rundle	17,598	75.1	+12.9
Liberal	Marie O'Dea	5,846	24.9	+24.9
National hold				

2021 Western Australian state election: Roe
Party	Candidate	Votes	%	±%
National	Peter Rundle	8,506	41.6	−0.1
Labor	Bradley Willis	5,979	29.2	+14.7
Liberal	David Dwyer	3,004	14.7	−9.9
Shooters, Fishers, Farmers	Bevan Steele	982	4.8	−0.2
Greens	Nikki Starr	809	4.0	+0.5
Christians	Cathie Kelly	502	2.5	+0.1
One Nation	Graham Bushby	352	1.7	−6.3
WAxit	Gary Jammu	180	0.9	+0.9
No Mandatory Vaccination	Nita Thakrar	131	0.6	+0.6
Total formal votes		20,445	96.1	0.0
Informal votes		833	3.9	+0.0
Turnout		21,278	86.1	−5.1
Two-candidate-preferred result
National	Peter Rundle	12,483	61.1	−2.7
Labor	Bradley Willis	7,946	38.9	+38.9
National hold				

=== Elections in the 2010s ===
2017 Western Australian state election: Roe
Party	Candidate	Votes	%	±%
National	Peter Rundle	9,553	42.5	−13.2
Liberal	Graham Jacobs	5,383	23.9	−2.8
Labor	Bradley Willis	3,203	14.2	+3.4
One Nation	Eketerina Zacklova	1,792	8.0	+8.0
Shooters, Fishers, Farmers	Peter Stacey	1,182	5.3	+5.3
Greens	Simone McInnes	759	3.4	−0.4
Christians	Cathie Kelly	536	2.4	−0.6
	Anthony Fels	76	0.3	+0.3
Total formal votes		22,484	96.2	+0.6
Informal votes		883	3.8	−0.6
Turnout		23,367	89.2	−4.0
Two-party-preferred result
National	Peter Rundle	17,148	76.3	−1.3
Labor	Bradley Willis	5,328	23.7	+1.3
Two-candidate-preferred result
National	Peter Rundle	14,474	64.4	−2.3
Liberal	Graham Jacobs	7,997	35.6	+2.3
National hold		Swing	−2.3	

=== Elections in the 2000s ===
2005 Western Australian state election: Roe
Party	Candidate	Votes	%	±%
Liberal	Graham Jacobs	5,629	48.2	+27.0
National	Jane McMeikan	3,746	32.1	−5.1
Labor	Ron Sao	1,219	10.4	−5.8
Greens	Louise Lodge	355	3.0	+3.0
One Nation	Charles Johnston	299	2.6	−18.9
Christian Democrats	Steve Leeder	234	2.0	+2.0
Independent	Bill Crabtree	188	1.6	+1.6
Total formal votes		11,670	96.4	−0.5
Informal votes		439	3.6	+0.5
Turnout		12,109	90.3	
Two-party-preferred result
Liberal	Graham Jacobs	9,540	81.8	+10.1
Labor	Ron Sao	2,119	18.2	−10.1
Two-candidate-preferred result
Liberal	Graham Jacobs	6,475	55.6	+55.6
National	Jane McMeikan	5,181	44.4	−27.3
Liberal gain from National		Swing	N/A	

2001 Western Australian state election: Roe
Party	Candidate	Votes	%	±%
National	Ross Ainsworth	4,430	37.2	−16.3
One Nation	Bob Hodgkinson	2,553	21.5	+21.5
Liberal	Anthony Fels	2,524	21.2	+21.2
Labor	Steve Boni	1,931	16.2	+5.9
Curtin Labor Alliance	Steve Leeder	458	3.9	+3.9
Total formal votes		11,896	96.8	−0.8
Informal votes		387	3.2	+0.8
Turnout		12,283	91.3	
Two-party-preferred result
National	Ross Ainsworth	8,430	71.7	−11.1
Labor	Steve Boni	3,325	28.3	+11.1
Two-candidate-preferred result
National	Ross Ainsworth	8,189	69.2	+7.2
One Nation	Bob Hodgkinson	3,653	30.8	+30.8
National hold		Swing	+7.2	

=== Elections in the 1990s ===
1996 Western Australian state election: Roe
Party	Candidate	Votes	%	±%
National	Ross Ainsworth	6,286	53.6	0.0
Independent	Lance Shearer	2,304	19.6	+19.6
Independent	Lesley Parker	1,927	16.4	+16.4
Labor	June Belton	1,217	10.4	−5.7
Total formal votes		11,734	97.7	+1.0
Informal votes		281	2.3	−1.0
Turnout		12,015	91.5	
Two-party-preferred result
National	Ross Ainsworth	9,709	82.8	+0.8
Labor	June Belton	2,011	17.2	−0.8
Two-candidate-preferred result
National	Ross Ainsworth	7,265	62.0	−20.0
Independent	Lance Shearer	4,459	38.0	+38.0
National hold		Swing	−20.0	

1993 Western Australian state election: Roe
Party	Candidate	Votes	%	±%
National	Ross Ainsworth	6,033	53.6	+19.6
Liberal	Allan Matthews	3,104	27.6	−14.7
Labor	Rosemary Braybrook	1,804	16.0	−2.7
Independent	Roderick Rogers	312	2.8	+2.8
Total formal votes		11,253	96.6	+1.1
Informal votes		393	3.4	−1.1
Turnout		11,646	94.1	+2.5
Two-candidate-preferred result
National	Ross Ainsworth	7,721	68.6	+17.6
Liberal	Allan Matthews	3,532	31.4	−17.6
National hold		Swing	+17.6	

=== Elections in the 1980s ===
1989 Western Australian state election: Roe
Party	Candidate	Votes	%	±%
Liberal	Graham Jacobs	4,412	42.3	−0.6
National	Ross Ainsworth	3,548	34.0	+7.4
Labor	Peter Blond	1,953	18.7	−11.7
Citizens Electoral Council	Dallas Clarnette	525	5.0	+5.0
Total formal votes		10,438	95.5	
Informal votes		491	4.5	
Turnout		10,929	91.6	
Two-candidate-preferred result
National	Ross Ainsworth	5,320	51.0	+51.0
Liberal	Graham Jacobs	5,118	49.0	−13.9
National gain from Liberal		Swing	N/A	

1980 Western Australian state election: Roe
Party	Candidate	Votes	%	±%
Liberal	Geoff Grewar	3,766	47.2	−3.2
National Country	John Paterson	2,255	28.2	−5.6
Labor	Kevin Moore	1,111	13.9	−1.9
National	Owen Kirwan	849	10.6	+10.6
Total formal votes		7,981	97.5	−0.7
Informal votes		201	2.5	+0.7
Turnout		8,182	90.8	−1.2
Two-candidate-preferred result
Liberal	Geoff Grewar	4,879	61.1	+2.8
National Country	John Paterson	3,102	38.9	−2.8
Liberal hold		Swing	+2.8	

=== Elections in the 1970s ===
1977 Western Australian state election: Roe
Party	Candidate	Votes	%	±%
Liberal	Geoff Grewar	3,792	50.4	
National Country	Owen Kirwan	2,542	33.8	
Labor	Dianne Jones	1,190	15.8	
Total formal votes		7,524	98.2	
Informal votes		135	1.8	
Turnout		7,659	92.0	
Two-party-preferred result
Liberal	Geoff Grewar	6,080	80.8	+6.8
Labor	Dianne Jones	1,444	19.2	−6.8
Liberal hold		Swing	+6.8	

- Preferences were not distributed between the Liberal and NCP candidates for Roe.

1974 Western Australian state election: Roe
Party	Candidate	Votes	%	±%
National Alliance	Bill Young	3,047	43.3	
Liberal	Geoff Grewar	2,394	34.1	
Labor	John Byrne	1,588	22.6	
Total formal votes		7,029	97.2	
Informal votes		205	2.8	
Turnout		7,234	90.9	
Two-candidate-preferred result
Liberal	Geoff Grewar	3,638	51.8	
National Alliance	Bill Young	3,391	48.2	
Liberal gain from National Alliance		Swing		

1971 Western Australian state election: Roe
Party	Candidate	Votes	%	±%
Country	Bill Young	3,133	41.5	−4.5
Independent	Leonard Gleeson	2,417	32.0	+32.0
Independent	Marianne McCall	1,227	16.3	+16.3
Democratic Labor	Stephen Mulally	766	10.2	+10.2
Two-candidate-preferred result
Country	Bill Young	3,871	51.3	−8.4
Independent	Leonard Gleeson	3,672	48.7	+48.7
Country hold		Swing	N/A	

=== Elections in the 1960s ===
1968 Western Australian state election: Roe
Party	Candidate	Votes	%	±%
Country	Bill Young	2,931	46.0	
Liberal and Country	Mel Bungey	2,209	34.7	
Labor	John Jehu	1,226	19.3	
Total formal votes		6,366	98.8	
Informal votes		80	1.2	
Turnout		6,446	94.5	
Two-candidate-preferred result
Country	Bill Young	3,799	59.7	
Liberal and Country	Mel Bungey	2,567	40.3	
Country hold		Swing		

1967 Roe state by-election
Party	Candidate	Votes	%	±%
Country	Bill Young	3,481	66.9	N/A
Liberal and Country	Melville Bungey	1,723	33.1	+33.1
Total formal votes		5,204	97.9	
Informal votes		114	2.1	
Turnout		5,318	81.3	
Country hold		Swing	N/A	

1965 Western Australian state election: Roe
Party	Candidate	Votes	%	±%
Country	Tom Hart	unopposed		
Country hold		Swing		

1962 Western Australian state election: Roe
Party	Candidate	Votes	%	±%
Country	Tom Hart	3,619	69.7	
Liberal and Country	Colin Cameron	1,571	30.3	
Total formal votes		5,190	98.4	
Informal votes		82	1.6	
Turnout		5,272	92.5	
Country hold		Swing		

=== Elections in the 1950s ===
1959 Western Australian state election: Roe
Party	Candidate	Votes	%	±%
Country	Charles Perkins	2,669	58.1	−41.9
Independent Country	Edward Biglin	1,922	41.9	+41.9
Total formal votes		4,591	98.4	
Informal votes		74	1.6	
Turnout		4,665	91.7	
Country hold		Swing	N/A	

1956 Western Australian state election: Roe
Party	Candidate	Votes	%	±%
Country	Charles Perkins	unopposed		
Country hold		Swing		

1953 Western Australian state election: Roe
Party	Candidate	Votes	%	±%
Country	Charles Perkins	unopposed		
Country hold		Swing		

1950 Western Australian state election: Roe
Party	Candidate	Votes	%	±%
Country	Harrie Seward	1,849	38.7	
Country	Charles Perkins	1,745	36.5	
Labor	Percy Munday	1,187	24.8	
Total formal votes		4,781	98.5	
Informal votes		72	1.5	
Turnout		4,853	90.7	
Two-candidate-preferred result
Country	Charles Perkins	2,538	53.1	
Country	Harrie Seward	2,243	46.9	
Country hold		Swing		
