= Members of the Western Australian Legislative Assembly, 1965–1968 =

This is a list of members of the Western Australian Legislative Assembly from 1965 to 1968:

Name	Party	District	Years in office
Arthur Bickerton	Labor	Pilbara	1958–1974
Stewart Bovell	Liberal	Vasse	1947–1971
John Brady	Labor	Swan	1948–1974
David Brand	Liberal	Greenough	1945–1975
Richard Burt	Liberal	Murchison	1959–1971
George Cornell^{[3]}	Country	Mount Marshall	1947–1967
Charles Court	Liberal	Nedlands	1953–1982
James Craig	Country	Toodyay	1959–1971
Harold Crommelin	Liberal	Claremont	1956–1968
Henry Curran	Labor	Cockburn	1960–1968
Ron Davies	Labor	Victoria Park	1961–1986
Ken Dunn	Liberal	Darling Range	1962–1971
Peter Durack	Liberal	Perth	1965–1968
Ross Elliott	Liberal	Canning	1965–1968
Tom Evans	Labor	Kalgoorlie	1956–1980
Harry Fletcher	Labor	Fremantle	1959–1977
Harry Gayfer	Country	Avon	1962–1974
Herb Graham	Labor	Balcatta	1943–1973
Bill Grayden	Liberal	South Perth	1947–1949; 1956–1993
Hugh Guthrie	Liberal	Subiaco	1959–1971
Jack Hall	Labor	Albany	1956–1970
Tom Hart^{[2]}	Country	Roe	1962–1967
Albert Hawke	Labor	Northam	1933–1968
John Hearman	Liberal	Blackwood	1950–1968
Bill Hegney	Labor	Mount Hawthorn	1939–1968
James Hegney	Labor	Belmont	1930–1947; 1950–1968
Guy Henn	Liberal	Wembley	1959–1971
Ross Hutchinson	Liberal	Cottesloe	1950–1977
Colin Jamieson	Labor	Beeloo	1953–1986
Lionel Kelly	Labor	Merredin-Yilgarn	1941–1968
Edgar Lewis	Country	Moore	1958–1974
Iven Manning	Liberal	Wellington	1950–1974
William Manning	Country	Narrogin	1956–1974
Bob Marshall	Liberal	Maylands	1965–1968
Harry May	Labor	Collie	1947–1968
Ray McPharlin^{[3]}	Country	Mount Marshall	1967–1983
Clayton Mitchell	Country	Stirling	1962–1971
Arthur Moir	Labor	Boulder-Eyre	1951–1971
Crawford Nalder	Country	Katanning	1947–1974
Les Nimmo	Liberal	Karrinyup	1947–1956; 1959–1968
Daniel Norton	Labor	Gascoyne	1953–1974
Ray O'Connor	Liberal	Mount Lawley	1959–1984
Des O'Neil	Liberal	East Melville	1959–1980
John Rhatigan	Labor	Kimberley	1953–1968
Joseph Rowberry	Labor	Warren	1958–1968
Ewart Runciman	Liberal	Murray	1962–1974
Cyril Rushton^{[1]}	Liberal	Dale	1965–1988
Bill Sewell	Labor	Geraldton	1950–1974
Merv Toms	Labor	Bayswater	1956–1971
John Tonkin	Labor	Melville	1933–1977
Gerald Wild^{[1]}	Liberal	Dale	1947–1965
Maurice Williams	Liberal	Bunbury	1962–1973
Bill Young^{[2]}	Country	Roe	1967–1974

== Notes ==
^{1} On 16 March 1965, the Liberal member for Dale, Gerald Wild, resigned to take up an appointment as Agent-General for Western Australia in London. Liberal candidate Cyril Rushton won the resulting by-election on 8 May 1965.
^{2} On 30 June 1967, the Country Party member for Roe, Tom Hart, resigned. Country Party candidate Bill Young won the resulting by-election on 2 September 1967.
^{3} On 6 July 1967, the Country Party member for Mount Marshall, George Cornell, died. Country Party candidate Ray McPharlin won the resulting by-election on 2 September 1967.

== Sources ==
- "Former Members" (PDF). Parliament of Western Australia. 2011. Archived from the original (PDF) on 7 August 2011.
