= List of elections in 1967 =

The following elections occurred in 1967.

- 1967 Indian general election
- 1967 Dutch general election
- 1967 Icelandic parliamentary election
- 1967 Liberian general election
- 1967 Mauritian general election
- 1967 Nicaraguan general election
- 1967 Norwegian local elections
- 1967 Philippine Senate election
- 1967 Salvadoran presidential election
- 1967 Sierra Leonean general election
- 1967 Swazi parliamentary election

== Africa ==
- 1967 Democratic Republic of the Congo constitutional referendum
- 1967 Gabonese general election
- 1967 Liberian general election
- 1967 Mauritian general election
- 1967 Sierra Leonean general election
- 1967 South African presidential election

== Asia ==
- 1967 Japanese general election
- 1967 Jordanian general election
- 1967 Iranian legislative election
- 1967 Kuwaiti general election
- 1967 Laotian parliamentary election
- 1967 North Korean local elections
- 1967 North Korean parliamentary election
- 1967 Sikkimese general election
- 1967 Singaporean by-elections
- 1967 Singaporean presidential election
- 1967 South Korean legislative election
- 1967 South Korean presidential election
- 1967 South Vietnamese parliamentary election
- 1967 South Vietnamese presidential election

=== India ===
- 1967 Indian general election
- 1951–1971 Indian general elections
- Indian general election in Andhra Pradesh, 1967
- Indian general election in Madras, 1967
- 1967 Indian presidential election
- 1967 Indian vice presidential election
- 1967 Madras State legislative assembly election

== Australia ==
- 1967 Australian Senate election
- 1967 Bathurst state by-election
- 1967 Capricornia by-election
- 1967 Corio by-election
- 1967 Mount Marshall state by-election
- 1967 Australian referendum
- 1967 Roe state by-election
- 1967 Victorian state election

== Europe ==
- 1967 Andorran parliamentary election
- 1967 Gibraltar sovereignty referendum
- 1967 Greek legislative election
- 1967 Hungarian parliamentary election
- 1967 Irish local elections
- 1967 Spanish general election
- 1967 Swiss federal election
- 1967 Yugoslavian parliamentary election

=== France ===
- 1967 French cantonal elections
- 1967 French legislative election

=== Germany ===
- 1967 East German general election
- 1967 Rhineland-Palatinate state election

=== United Kingdom ===
- 1967 Brierley Hill by-election
- 1967 Cambridge by-election
- 1967 Glasgow Pollok by-election
- 1967 Greater London Council election
- 1967 Hamilton by-election
- 1967 Honiton by-election
- 1967 Leicester South West by-election
- 1967 Liberal Party leadership election
- 1967 Manchester Gorton by-election
- 1967 Nuneaton by-election
- 1967 Rhondda West by-election
- 1967 Walthamstow West by-election
- 1967 West Derbyshire by-election
- 1967 United Kingdom local elections

== North America ==
=== Canada ===
- 1967 Alberta general election
- 1967 New Brunswick general election
- 1967 Northwest Territories general election
- 1967 Nova Scotia general election
- 1967 Ontario general election
- 1967 Progressive Conservative leadership election
- 1967 Saskatchewan general election
- 1967 Yukon general election

=== Caribbean ===
- 1967 Anguillian general election
- 1967 Haitian parliamentary election
- 1967 Jamaican general election

=== Mexico ===
- 1967 Mexican legislative election

=== United States ===
==== United States gubernatorial ====
- 1967 Kentucky gubernatorial election
- 1967 Mississippi gubernatorial election
- 1967 United States gubernatorial elections

==== United States House of Representatives ====
- 1967 United States House of Representatives elections

==== United States mayoral elections ====
- 1967 Baltimore mayoral election
- 1967 Boston mayoral election
- 1967 Chicago mayoral election
- 1967 Cleveland mayoral election
- 1967 Columbus mayoral election
- 1967 Evansville mayoral election
- 1967 Gary mayoral election
- 1967 Indianapolis mayoral election
- 1967 Manchester mayoral election
- 1967 Orlando mayoral special election
- 1967 Philadelphia mayoral election
- 1967 San Diego mayoral election
- 1967 San Francisco mayoral election
- 1967 South Bend mayoral election
- 1967 Springfield mayoral election
- 1967 Tampa mayoral election

== Oceania ==
=== Australia ===
- 1967 Australian Senate election
- 1967 Bathurst state by-election
- 1967 Capricornia by-election
- 1967 Corio by-election
- 1967 Mount Marshall state by-election
- 1967 Australian referendum
- 1967 Roe state by-election
- 1967 Victorian state election
