= Electoral results for the district of Eyre =

Western Australian district election results

This is a list of electoral results for the electoral district of Eyre in Western Australian state elections.

== Members for Eyre ==
First incarnation (1950–1962)
Member	Party	Term
Emil Nulsen	Labor	1950–1962
Second incarnation (1989–2005)
Member	Party	Term
Julian Grill	Labor	1989–2001
John Bowler	Labor	2001–2005
Third incarnation (2008–present)
Graham Jacobs	Liberal	2008–2017

== Election results ==
=== Elections in the 2010s ===
2013 Western Australian state election: Eyre
Party	Candidate	Votes	%	±%
Liberal	Graham Jacobs	5,870	41.1	–4.8
National	Colin de Grussa	5,258	36.8	+9.9
Labor	Greg Smith	2,082	14.6	–4.7
Greens	Giorgia Johnson	715	5.0	–2.2
Christians	Brett Hilton	366	2.6	+2.6
Total formal votes		14,291	94.6	–0.3
Informal votes		816	5.4	+0.3
Turnout		15,107	87.3	
Two-party-preferred result
Liberal	Graham Jacobs	10,474	73.3	+4.0
Labor	Greg Smith	3,817	26.7	–4.0
Two-candidate-preferred result
Liberal	Graham Jacobs	7,203	50.4	–3.0
National	Colin de Grussa	7,078	49.6	+3.0
Liberal hold		Swing	–3.0	

=== Elections in the 2000s ===
2008 Western Australian state election: Eyre
Party	Candidate	Votes	%	±%
Liberal	Graham Jacobs	6,515	46.1	+0.5
National	Suzie Williams	3,754	26.6	+9.9
Labor	John Keogh	2,745	19.4	−9.0
Greens	Linda Parker	1,019	7.2	+3.6
Citizens Electoral Council	Arthur Edward Harvey	104	0.7	+0.7
Total formal votes		14,137	94.9	−0.9
Informal votes		757	5.1	+0.9
Turnout		14,894	83.7	
Two-candidate-preferred result
Liberal	Graham Jacobs	7,578	53.6	−11.2
National	Suzie Williams	6,550	46.4	+46.4
Liberal hold		Swing	−11.2	

2001 Western Australian state election: Eyre
Party	Candidate	Votes	%	±%
Labor	John Bowler	3,143	42.4	−14.8
Liberal	Laurie Ayers	1,922	25.9	+4.7
One Nation	Neville Smith	1,310	17.7	+17.7
Independent	Suzie Williams	1,036	14.0	+14.0
Total formal votes		7,411	95.5	+0.5
Informal votes		347	4.5	−0.5
Turnout		7,758	82.4	
Two-party-preferred result
Labor	John Bowler	4,252	57.9	−3.1
Liberal	Laurie Ayers	3,092	42.1	+42.1
Labor hold		Swing	−3.1	

=== Elections in the 1990s ===
1996 Western Australian state election: Eyre
Party	Candidate	Votes	%	±%
Labor	Julian Grill	4,611	57.2	+3.6
National	Kathy Finlayson	1,732	21.5	+21.5
Liberal	Don Green	1,714	21.3	−14.1
Total formal votes		8,057	95.1	−0.4
Informal votes		418	4.9	+0.4
Turnout		8,475	80.1	
Two-party-preferred result
Labor	Julian Grill	4,908	61.0	+2.8
National	Kathy Finlayson	3,139	39.0	+39.0
Labor hold		Swing	+2.8	

1993 Western Australian state election: Eyre
Party	Candidate	Votes	%	±%
Labor	Julian Grill	5,137	54.1	−3.6
Liberal	Stephen Sprigg	3,352	35.3	+3.5
Independent	Darrall Renton	1,005	10.6	+10.6
Total formal votes		9,494	95.4	+3.2
Informal votes		457	4.6	−3.2
Turnout		9,951	86.8	+6.2
Two-party-preferred result
Labor	Julian Grill	5,558	58.5	−2.7
Liberal	Stephen Sprigg	3,936	41.5	+2.7
Labor hold		Swing	−2.7	

=== Elections in the 1980s ===
1989 Western Australian state election: Eyre
Party	Candidate	Votes	%	±%
Labor	Julian Grill	4,843	57.7	−13.7
Liberal	Stephen Sprigg	2,673	31.8	+9.1
Independent	Yvonne Hicks	461	5.5	+5.5
Independent	Donald Green	418	5.0	+5.0
Total formal votes		8,395	92.2	
Informal votes		706	7.8	
Turnout		9,101	80.6	
Two-party-preferred result
Labor	Julian Grill	5,138	61.2	−13.0
Liberal	Stephen Sprigg	3,257	38.8	+13.0
Labor hold		Swing	−13.0	

=== Elections in the 1950s ===
1959 Western Australian state election: Eyre
Party	Candidate	Votes	%	±%
Labor	Emil Nulsen	2,685	68.9	−31.1
Liberal and Country	Orlando Stuart	1,214	31.1	+31.1
Total formal votes		3,899	99.2	
Informal votes		31	0.8	
Turnout		3,930	87.0	
Labor hold		Swing	N/A	

1956 Western Australian state election: Eyre
Party	Candidate	Votes	%	±%
Labor	Emil Nulsen	unopposed		
Labor hold		Swing		

1953 Western Australian state election: Eyre
Party	Candidate	Votes	%	±%
Labor	Emil Nulsen	unopposed		
Labor hold		Swing		

1950 Western Australian state election: Eyre
Party	Candidate	Votes	%	±%
Labor	Emil Nulsen	2,110	71.1	
Liberal and Country	Roy Cunningham	858	28.9	
Total formal votes		2,968	97.6	
Informal votes		73	2.4	
Turnout		3,041	83.5	
Labor hold		Swing		
