= Tony Crook (politician) =

Australian politician

Member of the Australian Parliament for O'Connor
- In office 21 August 2010 – 5 August 2013
- Preceded by: Wilson Tuckey
- Succeeded by: Rick Wilson

Personal details
- Born: Anthony John Crook; 23 June 1959 (age 67) Merredin, Western Australia
- Party: The Nationals WA
- Website: http://www.tonycrook.com.au/

Anthony John Crook (born 23 June 1959) is a retired Australian politician. He was the member of the Australian House of Representatives seat of O'Connor for the National Party of Western Australia from the 2010 federal election until August 2013. Crook served as chairman of the Western Division of the Royal Flying Doctor Service for 10 years until his retirement in 2009.

== Early life ==
Crook was born and raised in Merredin in the wheatbelt region, where his family were pioneer farmers in the area.

Crook once owned Woolibar station, a 140,000 hectares (350,000 acres) sheep station approximately 45 km south of Kalgoorlie and sold the business in 2006 to become part of an agricultural consultancy in Kalgoorlie with his brother Brett.

== Politics ==
In the 2007 federal election, Crook stood for the WA Nationals for a Senate seat but was unsuccessful. He also stood for the seat of Kalgoorlie at the 2008 state election, losing to independent John Bowler.

Following the redistribution of O'Connor, where the seat lost the Mid West region and gained the Goldfields–Esperance region, Crook ran against Liberal incumbent Wilson Tuckey at the 2010 election where a hung parliament resulted. The WA Nationals campaigned as an independent party which would not "report, answer and take direction from (federal Nationals leader) Warren Truss".

Crook won with 28.85 percent of the primary vote, a swing to the WA Nationals of 19.68 percent, finishing with 53.56 percent of the two-candidate preferred vote. Crook campaigned on a platform of a Royalties for Regions policy on a national level, was against the Mineral Resource Rent Tax, and sought these interests in his discussions with the major parties over who would get Crook's confidence and supply vote to form government.

Crook stated he would sit as a crossbencher advocating the interests of regional Western Australia. "I'm clearly an independent," he stated to reporters. "I can sit on the crossbenches quite comfortably." Later, he added that "Tony Abbott urged me to consider my position and said to consider that I am a member of the Nationals. But I highlighted to him that although we are a federated body, the WA Nationals are an autonomous political organisation." Crook said he had been disappointed by media coverage of the hung parliament, which counted him as part of the Coalition along with National MPs from east of the Nullarbor. "In every news report and press report we see, my number is being allocated in with the Coalition and it shouldn't be," he said. As mentioned above, the WA Nationals, unlike their federal counterparts, were not bound by any federal Coalition agreement. Crook stated that he was open to negotiating with either side to form government. On 6 September Crook declared his support for the Coalition on confidence and supply, but would otherwise sit on the crossbench. On 27 September Crook announced he would not be attending federal National Party of Australia party room meetings. Crook at times did vote for federal Labor government policies in parliament, contrary to the official position of the National Party of Australia.

On 2 May 2012 Crook announced that from Tuesday 8 May, he would move from the cross benches to sit with his National Party colleagues. He did not, however, participate in joint Coalition meetings.

== Retirement ==
On 9 April 2013 Crook announced he planned to retire from politics at the forthcoming election citing stress resulting from long-distance travel and separation from his family. At the Australian Federal election held on 7 September 2013, the Western Australian National Party suffered a 3.5% swing against them with the consequent return of the seat to the Liberal Party. The party no longer has representation in Australia's Federal parliament.

In early 2016 he was preselected by the Nationals WA to contest the seat of Kalgoorlie in the March 2017 state election from the retiring Nationals WA member Wendy Duncan MLA.

Following the 2017 state election in which Crook was unsuccessful he was appointed the chief executive officer (CEO) of the Kalgoorlie-Boulder Racing Club Inc (KBRC). The KBRC is one of the oldest and largest provincial racing clubs in Western Australia; well known for hosting The Round.

Parliament of Australia
Preceded by Wilson Tuckey	Member for O'Connor; 2010–2013	Succeeded by Rick Wilson
