= Electoral results for the district of Esperance-Dundas =

Western Australian district election results

This is a list of electoral results for the electoral district of Esperance-Dundas in Western Australian state elections.

== Members for Esperance-Dundas ==
Member	Party	Term
Julian Grill	Labor	1983–1989

== Election results ==
=== Elections in the 1980s ===
1986 Western Australian state election: Esperance-Dundas
Party	Candidate	Votes	%	±%
Labor	Julian Grill	5,829	57.1	+1.2
Liberal	Marie Wordsworth	4,379	42.9	+8.1
Total formal votes		10,208	97.4	+0.9
Informal votes		271	2.6	−0.9
Turnout		10,479	89.6	+2.7
Labor hold		Swing	−1.2	

1983 Western Australian state election: Esperance-Dundas
Party	Candidate	Votes	%	±%
Labor	Julian Grill	5,009	55.9	
Liberal	Geoff Grewar	3,112	34.7	
National Country	Robert Russell	834	9.3	
Total formal votes		8,955	96.5	
Informal votes		322	3.5	
Turnout		9,277	86.9	
Two-party-preferred result
Labor	Julian Grill	5,221	58.3	
Liberal	Geoff Grewar	3,734	41.7	
Labor hold		Swing		
