= 1914 Kalgoorlie state by-election =

1914 By-election in Western Australia

- 4 February 1914
	First party
Candidate	George McLeod	John Boileau
Party	Labor
Popular vote	1,462	772
Percentage	65.4	34.6
Swing	—	—

The 1914 Kalgoorlie state by-election was a by-election held on 4 February 1914 for the Kalgoorlie seat in the Western Australian Legislative Assembly. The by-election was triggered by the resignation of the sitting Labor member Albert Green on 8 December 1913 to contest federal preselection for the Division of Kalgoorlie.

== Background ==
Albert Green had represented the Kalgoorlie electorate since winning the seat at the 1911 state election. He resigned in December 1913. George McLeode was pre-selected as the Labor candidate. George Mcleod was the secretary of the Kalgoorlie-Boulder branch of the Federated Miners' Union. John Boileau stood against him. The campaign was described as them both having "kindly personal feelings" towards each other.

== Results ==
George McLeod won the seat for Labor with a strong majority.

1914 Kalgoorlie state by-election
Party	Candidate	Votes	%	±%
Labor	George McLeod	1,462	65.4	-
	John Boileau	772	34.6	-
Total formal votes		2,236	99.7	−
Informal votes		7	0.3	−
Turnout		2,243	49.1	−

== Aftermath ==
McLeod was declared elected and took his seat in the Legislative Assembly. Albert Green lost his preselection for Federal parliament and recontested his former seat in the Legislative Assembly. Mcleod was defeated by Albert Green in the Labor preselection for the 1914 state election later that year. McLeod was only a member from 4 February to 21 October 1914.

== See also ==
Electoral results for the district of Kalgoorlie
