= Roe district =

Roe district may refer to:

- Mallee (biogeographic region), formerly known as "Roe Botanical District";
- Electoral district of Roe.
