= 1942 York state by-election =

A by-election for the seat of York in the Legislative Assembly of Western Australia was held on 21 November 1942. It was triggered by the resignation of Charles Latham (the Country Party leader and leader of the opposition) on 7 October 1942, to take up an appointment to the Senate. The Country Party retained the seat, with Charles Perkins winning by just 40 votes on the two-candidate-preferred count.

== Background ==
Charles Latham had held York for the Country Party since the 1921 state election. He was elected party leader in 1930, and after the 1933 state election became leader of the opposition (due to the Country Party winning more seats than its coalition partner, the Nationalist Party). Latham resigned from parliament on 7 October 1942, to be appointed to the Senate. The writ for the by-election was issued on 10 October, with the close of nominations on 29 October. Polling day was on 21 November, with the writ returned on 4 December.

== Results ==
York state by-election, 1942
Party	Candidate	Votes	%	±%
Country	Charles Perkins	599	27.0	–34.5
Independent	John Keast	478	21.5	–17.0
Labor	Alfred Reynolds	472	21.2	+21.2
Independent Country	Albert Noonan	396	17.8	+17.8
Independent Labor	Harry Hyams	170	7.7	+7.7
Liberal (All-Parties)	Carlyle Ferguson	107	4.8	+4.8
Total formal votes		2,222	98.8	–0.6
Informal votes		28	1.2	+0.6
Turnout		2,250	80.3	–11.7
Two-candidate-preferred result
Country	Charles Perkins	1,131	50.9	N/A
Independent	John Keast	1,091	49.1	N/A
Country hold		Swing	N/A	

== Aftermath ==
Perkins held York until it was abolished at the 1950 state election, and then held Roe until his death in office in 1961. He served as a minister in the government of David Brand. One of his opponents at the by-election, Labor's Alfred Reynolds, won the seat of Forrest at the 1947 state election, although he served only a single term. Latham, the retiring member in York, served in the Senate for less than a year, losing his seat at the 1943 federal election. He returned to state parliament in 1946, as a member of the Legislative Council.

== See also ==
- List of Western Australian state by-elections
