= Wendy Duncan =

Australian politician

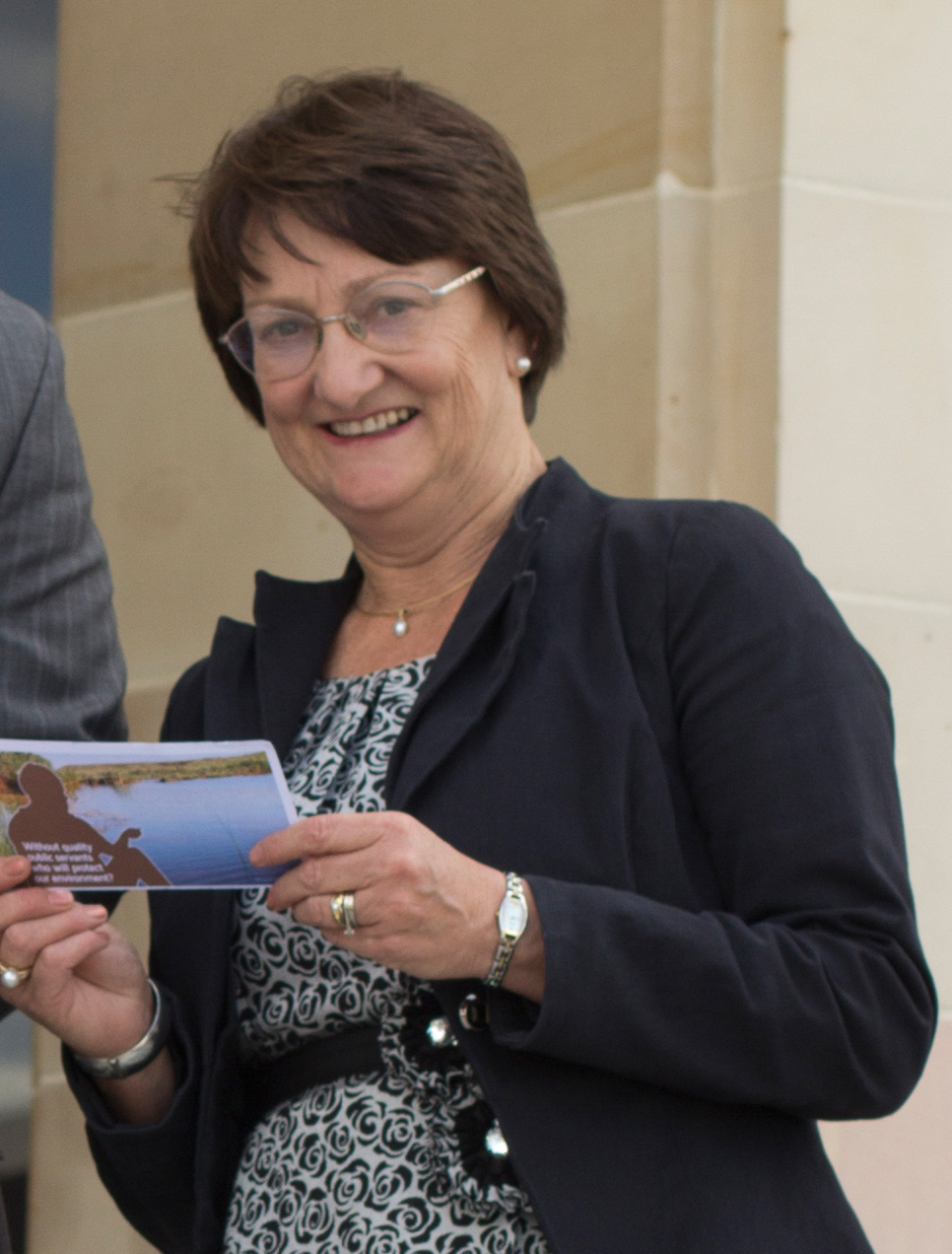

Member of the Legislative Assembly of Western Australia
- In office 9 March 2013 – 11 March 2017
- Preceded by: John Bowler
- Succeeded by: Kyran O'Donnell
- Constituency: Kalgoorlie

Member of the Legislative Council of Western Australia
- In office 29 January 2008 – 21 May 2009 Serving with Chance, Donaldson, Ellis, Fels
- Constituency: Agricultural Region
- In office 22 May 2009 – 12 February 2013 Serving with Baston, Bullock, Chapple, Ford, Moore
- Constituency: Mining and Pastoral Region

Personal details
- Born: Wendy Maxine Tonkin; 7 October 1954 (age 71) Kalgoorlie, Western Australia
- Party: National
- Education: University of Western Australia

Wendy Maxine Duncan (née Tonkin; born 7 October 1954) is an Australian politician who was a National Party member of the Legislative Assembly of Western Australia from 2013 to 2017, representing the seat of Kalgoorlie. She was previously a member of the Legislative Council, representing the Agricultural Region from 2008 to 2009 and the Mining and Pastoral Region from 2009 to 2013. She is a patron of the Earbus Foundation of Western Australia.

== Early life ==
Duncan was born in Kalgoorlie, Western Australia, to Shirley Maxine (née Davies) and Stephen John Tonkin. She and her siblings were raised on her parents' sheep station, and received their early education from the School of the Air. Duncan later boarded at Methodist Ladies' College in Perth. After leaving school, she spent a year in South Africa through the Rotary Youth Exchange, and then enrolled at the University of Western Australia, eventually graduating with a Bachelor of Arts degree in politics and Australian history. Duncan worked for the National Farmers' Federation in Canberra from 1977 to 1979, and also completed a postgraduate diploma at the Canberra College of Advanced Education (now the University of Canberra). Returning to Western Australia, she married Ian Murray Duncan in 1980, with whom she had four children, and then worked part-time at legal firms in Kalgoorlie and Esperance. She later worked in various administrative positions for the Shire of Esperance.

== Politics ==
From 1994 to 1998, Duncan worked as a research officer for Ross Ainsworth, a long-serving Nationals MLA for the seat of Roe. She joined the party herself in 2001, and from 2002 to 2003 served as president of the party's Esperance branch. Duncan served on the party's state executive from 2003 to 2004, and then from 2004 to 2008 served as state president, becoming the first woman to hold the position. During her presidency, she was one of the architects of the party's Royalties for Regions policy. She first stood for parliament at the 2005 state election, running second (behind Murray Criddle) on the party's ticket in Agricultural Region, but was not elected. She was also second on the party's ticket for the Senate at the 2007 federal election, but neither her nor the lead candidate, Tony Crook, were elected. However, in January 2008, Murray Criddle resigned from parliament, with Duncan taking his position in the Legislative Council on a countback. In her inaugural speech, she expressed concerns about foreign ownership of Australian resources, economic rationalism, the dominance of the two major parties and the neglect of regional and rural areas.

At the 2008 state election, Duncan transferred to the Mining and Pastoral Region, allowing a former party leader, Max Trenorden, to take her old seat. She was subsequently included in the new ministry formed by Colin Barnett of the Liberal Party, becoming parliamentary secretary to the Minister for Regional Development and Minister for Lands, and also assistant minister to the Minister for State Development and the Minister for Transport. In April 2012, Duncan won preselection for the seat of Kalgoorlie at the 2013 state election. At the election, in April 2013, she received 56.3 percent of the two-candidate-preferred vote, becoming the first member of the party to win the seat since its creation in 1901. After the election, she was elected deputy speaker to Michael Sutherland. Duncan stood for the deputy leadership of the National Party in November 2013, following the resignation of party leader Brendon Grylls, but was defeated by Mia Davies. Davies was also Grylls' replacement in cabinet.

In December 2014, Duncan stated that she might consider becoming an independent, having been overlooked a second time for a ministerial position during a cabinet reshuffle. She also warned her party not to "get too focused on agriculture. Royalties for Regions comes from mining and petroleum royalties, so don't turn your back on the regions they come from." However, she re-affirmed her commitment to the party shortly after. Duncan announced in December 2015 that she would retire from parliament at the 2017 state election.

== See also ==
- Women in the Western Australian Legislative Assembly
- Women in the Western Australian Legislative Council

Western Australian Legislative Assembly
Preceded by John Bowler	Member for Kalgoorlie; 2013–2017	Succeeded by Kyran O'Donnell
