= Herbert Styants =

Australian politician

Member of the Legislative Assembly of Western Australia
- In office 15 February 1936 – 7 April 1956
- Preceded by: James Cunningham
- Succeeded by: Tom Evans
- Constituency: Kalgoorlie

Personal details
- Born: 20 October 1893 Collie, Western Australia, Australia
- Died: 2 December 1982 (aged 89) Menora, Western Australia, Australia
- Party: Labor

Herbert Henry Styants (20 October 1893 – 2 December 1982) was an Australian politician who was a Labor Party member of the Legislative Assembly of Western Australia from 1936 to 1956, representing the seat of Kalgoorlie. He served as a minister in the government of Albert Hawke.

Styants was born in Collie, a town in Western Australia's South West region. After leaving school, he was employed by Western Australian Government Railways, working variously as an engine cleaner, a fireman, and then a driver. He came to Kalgoorlie in 1915, having earlier lived in Fremantle, and became a prominent member of the union movement there. In 1923, Styants left the goldfields to live in Perth, going on to serve on the Perth City Council from 1927 to 1930. He was elected to parliament at the 1936 state election, defeating two other Labor candidates (including the sitting member, James Cunningham) in Kalgoorlie. Styants enlisted in the Australian Imperial Force in 1940, while still serving in parliament, and during the war served as a non-commissioned officer in machine gun, cavalry, and education units. After Labor's victory at the 1953 state election, he was named Minister for Railways, Minister for Transport, and Minister for Police in the new ministry formed by Albert Hawke. However, prior to the 1956 election, Styants lost Labor preselection to Tom Evans, a 26-year-old schoolteacher, forcing his retirement. After leaving parliament, he served as chairman of the Betting Control Board from 1958 to 1960, and later retired to Perth, where he died in 1982.

Parliament of Western Australia
Preceded by James Cunningham	Member for Kalgoorlie; 1936–1956	Succeeded by Tom Evans
Political offices
Preceded by Charles Simpson	Minister for Railways; 1953–1956	Succeeded by Harry Strickland
Preceded by Charles Simpson	Minister for Transport; 1953–1956	Succeeded by Herb Graham
Preceded by Arthur Abbott	Minister for Police; 1953–1956	Succeeded by John Brady
