= John Boyland =

Australian politician and trade unionist

Member of the Western Australian Legislative Assembly
- In office 12 March 1921 – 14 December 1922
- Preceded by: Albert Green
- Succeeded by: James Cunningham
- Constituency: Kalgoorlie

Personal details
- Born: 11 September 1874 Sandhurst, Victoria, Australia
- Died: 14 December 1922 (aged 48) Perth, Western Australia, Australia
- Party: Labor (to 1917); National Labor (1917–?)
- Other political affiliations: Independent (from 1921)

John Boyland (11 September 1874 – 14 December 1922) was an Australian trade unionist and politician who was a member of the Western Australian Legislative Assembly from 1921 until his death, representing the seat of Kalgoorlie.

Boyland was born in Sandhurst, Victoria, to Jane (née Duncan) and John Boyland. He left school at an early age and eventually found his way to Queensland, where he was involved in the 1891 shearer's strike. Boyland arrived in Western Australia in 1895, during the gold rush, and worked as an underground miner for periods in Menzies and Kalgoorlie. He eventually became involved in the union movement, serving as an official for local branches of miners' unions and general unions. Following the 1916 Labor Party split over the issue of conscription, Boyland joined the new National Labor Party. He stood for parliament at the 1917 state election, but was defeated by John Lutey in the seat of Brownhill-Ivanhoe. At the 1921 election, Boyland ran in Kalgoorlie as an "independent Nationalist" candidate, and defeated the sitting Labor member, Albert Green. However, he died in office in December 1922, succumbing to miner's phthisis. He had married Bertha Bridger in 1906, with whom he had three children.

Parliament of Western Australia
Preceded by Albert Green	Member for Kalgoorlie; 1921–1922	Succeeded by James Cunningham
