= Electoral district of Eyre =

Former state electoral district of Western Australia

Eyre Western Australia—Legislative Assembly
- State: Western Australia
- Dates current: 1950–1962; 1989–2005; 2008–2017
- Namesake: Edward John Eyre
- Area: 292,240 km^{2} (112,834.5 sq mi)

Eyre was an electoral district of the Legislative Assembly of Western Australia. It was in existence for three separate periods (1950 to 1962, 1989 to 2005, and 2008 to 2017), on each occasion covering large portions of south-eastern Western Australia. Eyre was a safe seat for the Labor Party in its first two incarnations, but during its third incarnation was a marginal seat between the Liberal Party and the National Party.

== History ==
Eyre was first created for the 1950 election, mostly replacing Kanowna, and abolished ahead of the 1962 election. Labor MP Emil Nulsen, the former member for Kanowna, was the district's only member over the period, and was unopposed on two occasions.

Eyre was again created for the 1989 election, mostly as a replacement for Esperance-Dundas. It was abolished ahead of the 2005 state election. The district ultimately included the Shires of Coolgardie, Dundas, Laverton, Leonora, Menzies and Yilgarn, as well as the Boulder district and non-metropolitan components of the City of Kalgoorlie-Boulder. This incarnation of Eyre was held at all times by the Labor Party, and historically, only Southern Cross returned a consistent majority for the Liberal Party. The district was largely replaced by Murchison-Eyre.

An electorate named Eyre was created for a third time, on this occasion for the 2008 election. The new district was drawn from parts of Murchison-Eyre and Roe – both of which were abolished – as well as a small part of Kalgoorlie. Eyre is centred further south and west than its previous incarnations, incorporating large parts of the former seat of Roe – in particular, the towns of Esperance and Ravensthorpe. Roe had always been a non-Labor seat; indeed, Labor was frequently pushed into third place in that seat. For this reason, the new seat of Eyre was much less favourable to Labor than its predecessors. The new member was Liberal MP Graham Jacobs, who was previously the member for Roe. He held the seat until it was abolished in a redistribution prior to the 2017 state election, which also saw Roe re-created.

== Members for Eyre ==
First incarnation (1950–1962)
Member	Party	Term
Emil Nulsen	Labor	1950–1962
Second incarnation (1989–2005)
Member	Party	Term
Julian Grill	Labor	1989–2001
John Bowler	Labor	2001–2005
Third incarnation (2008–2017)
Graham Jacobs	Liberal	2008–2017

== Election results ==
2013 Western Australian state election: Eyre
Party	Candidate	Votes	%	±%
Liberal	Graham Jacobs	5,870	41.1	–4.8
National	Colin de Grussa	5,258	36.8	+9.9
Labor	Greg Smith	2,082	14.6	–4.7
Greens	Giorgia Johnson	715	5.0	–2.2
Christians	Brett Hilton	366	2.6	+2.6
Total formal votes		14,291	94.6	–0.3
Informal votes		816	5.4	+0.3
Turnout		15,107	87.3	
Two-party-preferred result
Liberal	Graham Jacobs	10,474	73.3	+4.0
Labor	Greg Smith	3,817	26.7	–4.0
Two-candidate-preferred result
Liberal	Graham Jacobs	7,203	50.4	–3.0
National	Colin de Grussa	7,078	49.6	+3.0
Liberal hold		Swing	–3.0	
