= Rick Wilson (Australian politician) =

Australian politician (born 1966)

Rick Wilson MP
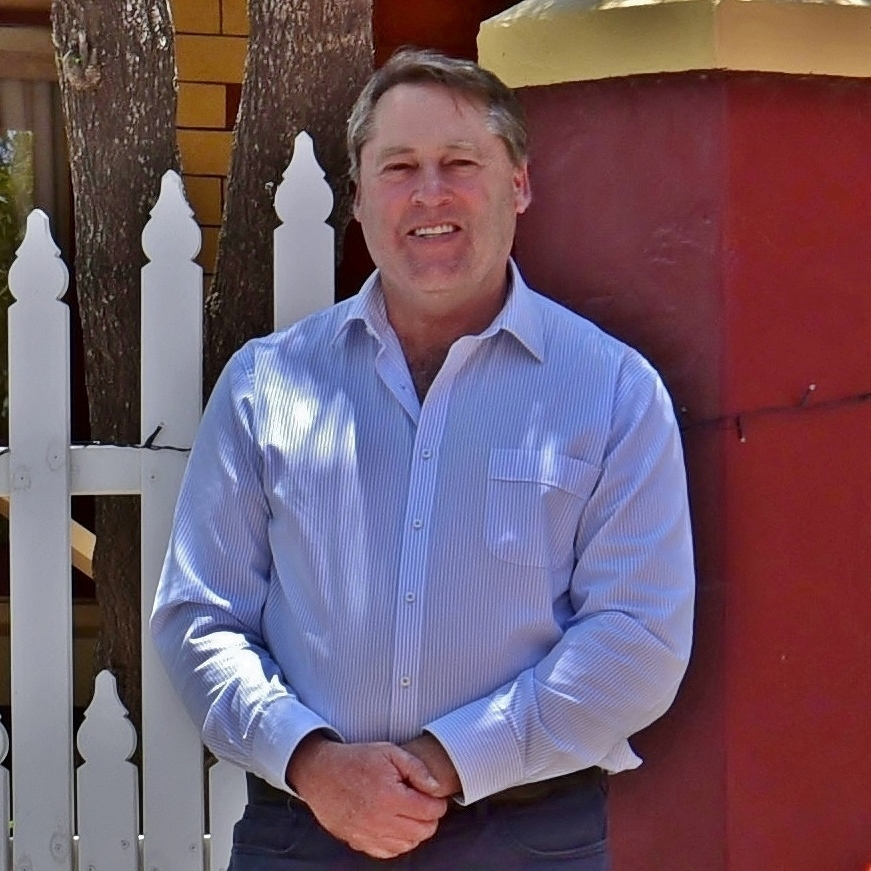
- Wilson in 2018

Member of the Australian Parliament for O'Connor
- Incumbent
- Assumed office 7 September 2013
- Preceded by: Tony Crook

Personal details
- Born: Richard James Wilson; 2 January 1966 (age 60) Katanning, Western Australia, Australia
- Party: Liberal Party of Australia
- Spouse: Tanya
- Occupation: Farmer
- Website: www.rickwilson.com.au

Richard James Wilson (born 2 January 1966) is an Australian politician. He is a member of the Liberal Party and has represented the Western Australian seat of O'Connor in the House of Representatives since the 2013 federal election. He was a farmer before entering politics.

== Early life ==
Wilson was born on 2 January 1966 in Katanning, Western Australia. He is the youngest of six children born to Mary and Archie Wilson, with his family having lived in the district since 1867. Wilson's father died when he was 14 and he was involved in the running of the family farm from a young age, eventually taking it over in partnership with his brother Allan. He holds a Bachelor of Business in agriculture from Curtin University.

Prior to entering politics, Wilson held office in the Pastoralists and Graziers Association of Western Australia (PGA) as vice-chairman (2000–2008) and chairman (2008–2011) of the Western Graingrowers Committee. During this time he "helped lead the campaign to deregulate the Australian wheat industry and end the Australian Wheat Board's monopoly". He also opposed the monopoly granted to CBH Group on grain freight.

== Politics ==
Prior to entering parliament, Wilson served as president of the Liberal Party's Katanning branch, treasurer and president of the O'Connor division, and on the state rural policy committee. He was elected to the House of Representatives at the 2013 federal election, winning the seat for the Liberals following the retirement of the incumbent Nationals MP Tony Crook.

Wilson was nominated to the speaker's panel in September 2019. He has served on a number of committees including as chair of the House Standing Committee on Agriculture and Water Resources from 2016 and chair of the Joint Statutory Committee on Public Works from 2020.

=== Political positions ===
Wilson is a member of the National Right faction of the Liberal Party.

In his maiden speech, Wilson described himself as "a social conservative and an economic liberal". He opposes same-sex marriage and abstained from the vote on what became the Marriage Amendment (Definition and Religious Freedoms) Act 2017, despite his electorate voting "Yes" in the Australian Marriage Law Postal Survey.

== Personal life ==
Wilson has four children with his wife Tanya. The family relocated from Katanning to Albany in 2015.

Parliament of Australia
Preceded by Tony Crook	Member for O'Connor; 2013–present	Incumbent
