= Ali Kent =

Australian politician (born 1960)

Ali Kent MLA

Member of the Western Australian Legislative Assembly for Kalgoorlie
- Incumbent
- Assumed office 13 March 2021
- Preceded by: Kyran O'Donnell

Personal details
- Born: 13 November 1960 (age 65) Swansea, Wales
- Party: Labor

Alison Elizabeth Kent (born 13 November 1960) is a member of the Western Australian Legislative Assembly for the electoral district of Kalgoorlie for the Australian Labor Party. She won her seat at the 2021 Western Australian state election with an 18.9% swing against the incumbent Liberal Party candidate. She was re-elected in the 2025 election. Her seat was the penultimate seat to be called.

Ali Kent emigrated to Australia from Wales in 1989. Prior to her election, Kent was the president of the Goldfields Women's Health Care Centre.

Western Australian Legislative Assembly
Preceded by Kyran O'Donnell	Member for Kalgoorlie; 2021–present	Incumbent
