= George McLeod (Australian politician) =

Australian trade unionist and politician

Member of the Legislative Assembly of Western Australia
- In office 4 February – 21 October 1914
- Preceded by: Albert Green
- Succeeded by: Albert Green
- Constituency: Kalgoorlie

Personal details
- Born: 2 July 1884 Kapunda, South Australia, Australia
- Died: 22 August 1919 (aged 35) Kalgoorlie, Western Australia, Australia
- Party: Labor

George McLeod (2 July 1884 – 22 August 1919) was an Australian trade unionist and politician who was a Labor Party member of the Legislative Assembly of Western Australia from February to October 1914, representing the seat of Kalgoorlie.

McLeod was born in Kapunda, South Australia, to Mary (née McKinnon) and James McLeod. He arrived in Western Australia in 1900, working as a miner on the Eastern Goldfields. He was elected president of the Mount Morgans branch of the Miners' Union in 1905, and later served as secretary of its Kalgoorlie branch (succeeding Jabez Dodd). McLeod first stood for parliament at the 1908 state election, as the Labor candidate for the seat of Kalgoorlie, but was defeated by Norbert Keenan. Labor's candidate in Kalgoorlie at the 1911 election was Albert Green, who won the seat. In December 1913, Green resigned from parliament in order to run for federal politics. McLeod was selected as the Labor candidate for the resulting by-election, and was elected with a large majority. However, in the Labor preselection contest prior to the 1914 state election, he was defeated by Green, who had been unsuccessful in his attempt to enter federal parliament. At the 1917 state election, McLeod contested the seat of Mount Margaret. He was defeated by the sitting member, George Taylor, who had defected from the Labor Party to join the newly formed National Labor Party. McLeod was elected state secretary of the Australian Workers' Union mining branch in 1919, but died later in the year from pneumonia, aged 35. He had married Evelyn Beadle in 1914, with whom he had two daughters.
