= Tom Evans (Western Australian politician) =

Australian politician

The Honourable Tom Evans

Treasurer of Western Australia
- In office 3 March – 12 October 1971
- Preceded by: Sir David Brand
- Succeeded by: John Tonkin

Attorney-General of Western Australia
- In office 12 October 1971 – 8 April 1974
- Preceded by: Ron Bertram
- Succeeded by: Neil McNeill

Member of the Legislative Assembly of Western Australia
- In office 7 April 1956 – 23 February 1980
- Preceded by: Herbert Styants
- Succeeded by: Ted Evans
- Constituency: Kalgoorlie

Personal details
- Born: 18 April 1929 Denmark, Western Australia, Australia
- Died: 27 February 1995 (aged 65) Subiaco, Western Australia, Australia
- Party: Labor

Thomas Daniel Evans (18 April 1929 – 27 February 1995) was an Australian politician who was a Labor Party member of the Legislative Assembly of Western Australia from 1956 to 1980, representing the seat of Kalgoorlie. He served as a minister in the government of John Tonkin, including as treasurer and attorney-general.

== Early life ==
Evans was born in Denmark, Western Australia, to Kathleen Veronica (née Hayden) and Daniel Thomas Evans. He was educated at various country schools, and later spent two years in Perth studying teaching, attending Claremont Teachers College. As a teacher, Evans spent time at schools in Leonora, Westonia, Gwalia, Roelands, Esperance, Boyup Brook, and Kalgoorlie.

== Politics ==
Evans was elected to parliament at the 1956 state election, aged only 26. He had defeated Herbert Styants (a long-serving MP) for Labor preselection. After entering parliament, he began studying law. He served his articles of clerkship with Tom Hartrey (a future Labor MP), and was called to the bar in 1965.

Following Labor's victory at the 1971 state election, Evans was made Treasurer, Minister for Forests, and Minister for Tourism in the new ministry formed by John Tonkin (also a former schoolteacher). He was the first state treasurer since James Gardiner in 1919 to not serve simultaneously as premier. However, Evans served as treasurer for only seven months, as Tonkin effected a ministerial reshuffle in October 1971 and assumed the position himself. After the reshuffle, Evans was appointed Attorney-General and Minister for Education.

In July 1972, Evans was also made Minister for Recreation. He lost the education portfolio to Jerry Dolan in May 1973, but remained in the ministry until the Labor government's defeat at the 1974 state election. Evans subsequently served in the shadow ministry until the 1977 election, under two leaders of the opposition (John Tonkin and Colin Jamieson).

== Later life ==
Evans left parliament at the 1980 election, and afterwards practised law in Kalgoorlie and Perth, including with his own firm. Evans died in Perth in February 1995, aged 65. He was married twice, firstly to Eileen O'Donnell in 1957, with whom he had three children. He remarried in 1979, to Karen Camilleri (née Broxton).

== See also ==
- Electoral results for the district of Kalgoorlie

Parliament of Western Australia
Preceded by Herbert Styants	Member for Kalgoorlie; 1956–1980	Succeeded by Ted Evans
Political offices
Preceded by Sir David Brand	Treasurer; 1971	Succeeded by John Tonkin
Preceded by Stewart Bovell	Minister for Forests; 1971	Succeeded by David Evans
Preceded by Sir David Brand	Minister for Tourism; 1971	Succeeded by Don Taylor
Preceded by Ron Bertram	Attorney-General; 1971–1974	Succeeded by Neil McNeill
Preceded by John Tonkin	Minister for Education; 1971–1973	Succeeded by Jerry Dolan
New creation	Minister for Recreation; 1972–1974	Succeeded by Graham MacKinnon
