= 1967 United States gubernatorial elections =

- November 7, 1967; February 6, 1968 (LA)

3 governorships
	Majority party	Minority party
Party	Republican	Democratic
Seats before	25	25
Seats after	26	24
Seat change	▲1	▼1
Seats up	0	3
Seats won	1	2
- Republican gain Democratic hold

United States gubernatorial elections were held in November 1967, in three states.

In Kentucky, Ned Breathitt wasn't allowed to run for a second term under the term limits rule at the time, a rule that was changed in 1992.

In Mississippi, Paul B. Johnson Jr. was also not eligible to run for a second term, a rule that was changed in the mid-1980s.

In Louisiana, John McKeithen was the first governor to serve two consecutive terms after an amendment to the Louisiana Constitution was passed on November 8, 1966. The primary for his second term was on November 4, 1967, and the actual election was on February 6, 1968, with no Republican opposition.

== Results ==
State	Incumbent	Party	Status	Opposing candidates
Kentucky	Ned Breathitt	Democratic	Term-limited, Republican victory	Louie Nunn Republican 51.20% Henry Ward (Democratic) 47.99% Christian Glanz (Conservative) 0.81%
Louisiana	John McKeithen	Democratic	Re-elected 100% in the general election	(Democratic primary results); John McKeithen 80.64% John Rarick 17.34% Cy D.F. Courtney 0.84% Frank Joseph Ahern 0.69% A. Roswell Thompson 0.49%
Mississippi	Paul B. Johnson, Jr.	Democratic	Term-limited, Democratic victory	John Bell Williams (Democratic) 70.27% Rubel L. Phillips (Republican) 29.73%
