= Megan Anwyl =

Australian politician (born 1962)

Megan Irene Anwyl (born 19 January 1962) is a former Australian politician. She was a Labor member of the Western Australian Legislative Assembly, representing Kalgoorlie from 1996 to 2001.

Anwyl was born in Melbourne, Victoria. She qualified as a solicitor and arrived in Western Australia in 1986. In 1996, she was elected to the Legislative Assembly in a by-election; she was later Shadow Minister for Family and Children's Services, Youth and Volunteer Services from 1997 to 1999. She held her seat until her defeat at the 2001 state election. She was the only Labor incumbent to be defeated at an election that saw Labor win a decisive victory. However, Anwyl only led Liberal challenger Matt Birney by eight votes on the first count, and lost when One Nation preferences flowed overwhelmingly to Birney. Her defeat ended a 78-year Labor run in the seat.

Currently the Chairman of the Magnetite Network, Megan formed this industry group in 2009 to represent the interests of magnetite producers. As inaugural Chairman of the North West Iron Ore Alliance Megan facilitated access to 50 million tonnes at Port Hedland inner harbor in 2008 for five junior ASX-listed mining companies including Atlas Iron. She aided the formation of the DomGas Alliance in 2006.

Western Australian Legislative Assembly
Preceded by Ian Taylor	Member for Kalgoorlie; 1996–2001	Succeeded by Matt Birney
