= 1967 Andorran parliamentary election =

- 12 December 1967 (first round); 28 December 1967 (second round)
- 12 of the 24 seats in the General Council
Party	Vote %	Seats	+/–
Independents	100	12	0
This lists parties that won seats. See the complete results below.

Parliamentary elections were held in Andorra on 12 December 1967 to elect half of the members of the General Council. In constituencies where not all seats were filled in the first round, a second round was held on 28 December.

The elections were held alongside local elections.

== Electoral system ==
Each parish had four seats in the General Council. The seats were elected on a staggered basis, with two members elected from each parish every two years. In Andorra la Vella parish two members represented the town of Andorra la Vella and two represented Les Escaldes, with one member elected from each every two years.

All candidates had to run on lists of candidates, although voters could split their votes between candidates on different lists. Any candidate receiving a majority of the vote was elected in the first round. If there were remaining seats to fill, a second round was held, in which candidates had to receive a majority of the vote to be elected. If there were still remaining seats to fill, a third round would be held in which the candidate(s) with the most votes would be elected.

== Results ==
Party	First round			Second round			Total seats
Party	Votes	%	Seats	Votes	%	Seats	Total seats
Independents			10			2	12
Total			10			2	12
Total votes	740	–					
Registered voters/turnout	1,014	72.98		180	–		
Source: La Vanguardia

=== Elected members ===
Constituency	Elected members	Round
Andorra la Vella	Càndid Riba	First round
Canillo	Manuel Casals	First round
Canillo		Second round
Encamp	Serafí Reig Ribó	First round
Encamp		Second round
La Massana	Secundí Camps Martí	First round
La Massana	Josep Rosell Parramón	First round
Les Escaldes	Estanislau Sangrà Font	First round
Ordino	Joan Bringué	First round
Ordino	Josep Riba	First round
Sant Julià de Lòria	Antoni Pintat Argelich	First round
Sant Julià de Lòria	Bartomeu Riba Tort	First round
Source: La Vanguardia
