= Graham Jacobs =

Australian politician

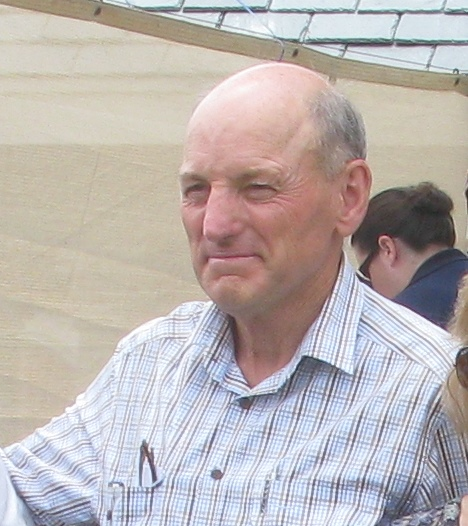

Member of the Western Australian Legislative Assembly for Eyre
- In office 6 September 2008 – 11 March 2017
- Preceded by: Seat re-created
- Succeeded by: Seat abolished

Member of the Western Australian Legislative Assembly for Roe
- In office 26 February 2005 – 6 September 2008
- Preceded by: Ross Ainsworth

Personal details
- Party: Liberal Party

Graham Gibson Jacobs (born 8 November 1949) is an Australian former politician. He was a Liberal member of the Western Australian Legislative Assembly from 2005 to 2017.

First elected to the seat of Roe at the 2005 election, he transferred to Eyre at the 2008 election following the abolition of his former seat.

Jacobs was born in Benalla, Victoria. His family moved to Western Australia in 1955 and settled on a farm at Lort River west of Esperance. Educated at Esperance Primary School then Esperance Senior High School, Jacobs attended the University of Western Australia from 1969 to 1975 and was awarded his Bachelor of Medicine and Surgery.

Jacobs is married to Kathryn and they have five children; Jesse, Daniel, Aubrey, Lucy and Julian. He is a physician by profession and lives in Esperance.

Jacobs had contested Roe in 1989 but it was not until the sitting Nationals member Ross Ainsworth left in 2005 that Jacobs again contested the seat and beat new Nationals candidate Jane McMeikan with a massive swing of 27%.

Jacobs served as the Opposition spokesperson for Drug Abuse Strategy from 2005 to 2008, the Shadow Minister for Environment & Climate Change and the Shadow Minister for Goldfields-Esperance in 2008. He also served as the opposition whip from 2005 to 2006 and again in 2008.

In May 2008, Jacobs called for a Liberal parliamentary leadership spill motion against Troy Buswell, which took place on 5 May 2008, but the motion failed and Buswell remained opposition leader. The following month Jacobs supported another unsuccessful spill motion against Buswell, this time led by Anthony Fels MLC. Buswell would eventually be replaced by Colin Barnett.

Following the state election in September 2008, where the incumbent Labor government was defeated and the National Party agreed to vote with the Liberal Party in the hung parliament, Jacobs became the Minister for Water and the Minister for Mental Health. He was a member of the Barnett Ministry from 23 September 2008 until 14 December 2010.

Jacobs became the member for the revived electorate of Eyre following the introduction of one-vote one-value electoral boundaries and the abolition of Roe. He was narrowly re-elected as the member for Eyre during the 2013 state election, fending off a strong challenge from the Nationals.

Jacobs has called for 'more balance' in terms of Royalties for Regions spending across regional Western Australia but has defended the program against calls for it to be scrapped.

He has also campaigned for more support to be extended to Western Australian farmers facing financial hardship, warning: "If we do not support our farmers we will see more foreign buy-up of land particularly by Chinese interests.".

Eyre was abolished ahead of the 2017 state election, and was partly replaced by a revived Roe. Jacobs attempted to transfer back to Roe. However, the new seat was a comfortably safe WA Nationals seat with a majority of 16 percent, a disadvantage Jacobs was unable to overcome despite his 12 years in the legislature. He lost to WA National candidate Peter Rundle, taking only 35.6 percent of the two-party vote.

Western Australian Legislative Assembly
Preceded by Ross Ainsworth	Member for Roe; 2005–2008	Succeeded by Seat abolished
New seat	Member for Eyre; 2008–2017	Abolished
