= 1967 Roe state by-election =

The 1967 Roe state by-election was a by-election held on 2 September 1967 for the Western Australian Legislative Assembly seat of Roe in the southeastern agricultural part of the state.

The by-election was triggered by the resignation of Country Party member Tom Hart on 6 July 1967.

The seat of Roe, first established in 1950, was considered to be a safe seat for the Country Party. At the time of the by-election, the seat included the towns of Dumbleyung, Gnowangerup, Kondinin, Kulin, Lake Grace, Narembeen and Ravensthorpe.

== Timeline ==
Date	Event
6 July 1967	Tom Hart resigned, vacating the seat of Roe.
2 August 1967	The Minister for Justice, Arthur Griffith, appointed polling places in the district.
4 August 1967	Writs were issued by the Speaker of the Legislative Assembly to proceed with a by-election.
11 August 1967	Close of nominations and draw of ballot papers.
2 September 1967	Polling day, between the hours of 8am and 6pm.
18 September 1967	The writ was returned and the results formally declared.

== Candidates ==
The by-election attracted two candidates. Bill Young, representing the Country Party, was a farmer and party official residing in Kondinin, while Mel Bungey, representing the Liberal and Country League, was a farmer residing in Gnowangerup.

== Results ==
Bill Young easily retained the seat for the Country Party. No swings are noted due to the seat being uncontested at the 1965 election.

Roe state by-election, 1967
Party	Candidate	Votes	%	±%
Country	Bill Young	3,481	66.89	
Liberal	Mel Bungey	1,723	33.11	
Total formal votes		5,204	97.86	
Informal votes		114	2.14	
Turnout		5,318	81.29	
Country hold		Swing	N/A	
