= Charles Perkins (Australian politician) =

Australian politician

Member of the Legislative Assembly of Western Australia
- In office 21 November 1942 – 25 March 1950
- Preceded by: Charles Latham
- Succeeded by: None (abolished)
- Constituency: York
- In office 25 March 1950 – 7 November 1961
- Preceded by: None (new seat)
- Succeeded by: Tom Hart
- Constituency: Roe

Personal details
- Born: 8 August 1906 Moonee Ponds, Victoria, Australia
- Died: 7 November 1961 (aged 55) Wembley, Western Australia, Australia
- Party: Country

Charles Collier Perkins (8 August 1906 – 7 November 1961) was an Australian politician who was a Country Party member of the Legislative Assembly of Western Australia from 1942 until his death. He served as a minister in the government of Sir David Brand.

Perkins was born in Melbourne to Gwendoline (née Collier) and Charles Henry Perkins. Educated at Geelong Grammar School, he arrived in Western Australia in 1929 and purchased a farm at Belka, which he owned for the rest of his life. Perkins became prominent in agricultural circles, serving on the executive of the Primary Producers' Association and as a director of Westralian Farmers Ltd, a co-operative. He entered parliament at the 1942 York by-election, which had been caused by the resignation of Charles Latham (a former Country Party leader).

After the 1947 state election, Perkins was appointed chairman of the committees in the Legislative Assembly, a position which held until the McLarty government's defeat at the 1953 election. At the 1950 election, he had transferred to the new seat of Roe. After the 1959 election, Perkins was included in the new ministry formed by David Brand, as Minister for Police, Minister for Transport, Minister for Labour, and Minister for Native Welfare. His four portfolios required large amounts of travel, including to interstate conferences and remote Aboriginal communities.

Perkins died of a heart attack in November 1961, at his home in Wembley, and was given a state funeral at St George's Cathedral. He had married Kathleen Jennings Laffar in 1938, with whom he had four children.

Parliament of Western Australia
Preceded by Charles Latham	Member for York; 1942–1950	Abolished
New seat	Member for Roe; 1950–1961	Succeeded by Tom Hart
Political offices
Preceded by Herb Graham	Minister for Transport; 1959–1961	Succeeded by George Cornell
Preceded by John Brady	Minister for Police; 1959–1961	Succeeded by George Cornell
Preceded by Bill Hegney	Minister for Labour; 1959–1961	Succeeded by Stewart Bovell
Preceded by John Brady	Minister for Native Welfare; 1959–1961	Succeeded by George Cornell
