= Ted Evans (politician) =

Australian politician

Member of the Legislative Assembly of Western Australia
- In office 23 February 1980 – 30 April 1981
- Preceded by: Tom Evans
- Succeeded by: Ian Taylor
- Constituency: Kalgoorlie

Personal details
- Born: Edward Thomas Evans; 7 September 1939 Menzies, Western Australia, Australia
- Died: 30 April 1981 (aged 41) Mount Lawley, Western Australia, Australia
- Party: Labor

Edward Thomas "Ted" Evans (7 September 1939 – 30 April 1981) was an Australian politician who was a Labor Party member of the Legislative Assembly of Western Australia from 1980 until his death, representing the seat of Kalgoorlie.

Evans was born in the remote Goldfields town of Menzies, and attended Eastern Goldfields High School in Kalgoorlie. After leaving school, he worked for a period in the gold mines, later holding jobs as a train examiner for Commonwealth Railways and as a clerk and accountant for various mining firms. Evans was involved with the trade union movement, first as a member of the Gold Mining Clerks' Association and later as a member of the Australian Workers' Union. A longtime member of the Labor Party, he stood for parliament at the 1980 state election, replacing the retiring Tom Evans (no relation) as the member for Kalgoorlie. However, Evans' time in parliament was short-lived, as he died just over a year after taking office, aged only 41. His death came while undergoing minor surgery in Perth, and was unexpected. The by-election occasioned by Evans' death was won by Ian Taylor, a future leader of the Labor Party. Evans is Catholic.
