= Kyran O'Donnell =

Australian politician

Member of the Western Australian Legislative Assembly for Kalgoorlie
- In office 11 March 2017 – 13 March 2021
- Preceded by: Wendy Duncan
- Succeeded by: Ali Kent

Personal details
- Born: 29 October 1958 (age 68) Melbourne, Victoria, Australia
- Party: Liberal
- Occupation: Police officer

Kyran Martin O'Donnell (born 29 October 1958) is a former Australian politician. He was a Liberal member of the Western Australian Legislative Assembly from the 2017 state election to the 2021 state election, representing the district of Kalgoorlie.

O'Donnell was a policeman before entering politics, and in 2013 was elected to Kalgoorlie-Boulder City Council.

At the 2021 state election, O'Donnell was defeated by Labor candidate Ali Kent. He was endorsed as a candidate on the Liberal ticket for the Legislative Council at the 2025 state election, but withdrew to contest the district of Kalgoorlie as an independent.

Western Australian Legislative Assembly
Preceded by Wendy Duncan	Member for Kalgoorlie; 2017–2021	Succeeded by Ali Kent
