= Matt Birney =

Former Western Australian politician

Leader of the Opposition in Western Australia
- In office 9 March 2005 – 24 March 2006
- Preceded by: Colin Barnett
- Succeeded by: Paul Omodei

Member of the Western Australian Legislative Assembly for Kalgoorlie
- In office 10 February 2001 – 6 September 2008
- Preceded by: Megan Anwyl
- Succeeded by: John Bowler

Personal details
- Born: Matthew John Birney; 10 June 1969 (age 57) Sydney, New South Wales, Australia
- Party: Liberal Party
- Profession: Small Business Proprietor

Matthew John Birney (born 10 June 1969) is an Australian former politician. He was a Liberal member of the Western Australian Legislative Assembly from 2001 to 2008, serving as Leader of the Opposition from 2005 to 2006.

== Early life ==
Birney was born in Sydney but comes from a family long established on the Western Australian goldfields, and has lived in the regional city of Kalgoorlie since childhood. His father, Jack Birney, was a Liberal member of the Australian House of Representatives for the Sydney electorate of Phillip from 1975 until his defeat in 1983.

The younger Birney was educated at North Kalgoorlie Primary and Eastern Goldfields Senior High School. He was a small business proprietor and a board member of the Kalgoorlie-Boulder Chamber of Commerce and Industry, before being elected to the Western Australian Legislative Assembly for the seat of Kalgoorlie in February 2001, defeating Labor incumbent Megan Anwyl.

== Political career ==
The seat had long been a Labor stronghold, which the party had held without interruption since 1923, and for all but seven years since its creation in 1901. However, Anwyl only led Birney by eight votes on the first count. Birney defeated Anwyl after the preferences of the One Nation candidate, Guy Hopkins, flowed overwhelmingly to him. He was the first Liberal to win Kalgoorlie, and only the third non-Labor member in the seat's 100-year history. He was also the only Liberal challenger to unseat a Labor incumbent at the 2001 state election, which saw Labor elected to government with a large majority.

Birney was Shadow Minister for Youth and the Goldfields-Esperance region from 2001 to 2002, Shadow Minister for Police, Goldfields-Esperance and Communication Services from 2002 to 2004 and Shadow Minister for Police, Commerce, Communications and Goldfields-Esperance from 2004 to 2005.

== Leader of the Opposition ==
Despite his relative lack of experience, Birney was widely seen as one of the Liberal Party's better performers in Opposition during the 2001-2005 parliament. He had been discussed as a potential challenger to Barnett's leadership during his first term in parliament. After the Liberal Party under Colin Barnett was heavily defeated at the 2005 elections by the Labor government of Geoff Gallop, Barnett returned to the backbench and Birney was elected party leader. He had retained Kalgoorlie with a healthy swing of eight percent, making Kalgoorlie a safe Liberal seat. Indeed, he actually won enough primary votes to retain the seat without the need for preferences.

After becoming leader, Birney came under consistent criticism from both inside and outside his party. A number of public gaffes, including suggesting in a radio interview that the Pope had a partner, and taking his girlfriend on a taxpayer funded tour of Europe, reduced his effectiveness as opposition leader. Within the party he was criticised for his lack of inclusiveness in policy formation. These problems led Barnett's former deputy leader, Paul Omodei, to challenge Birney for the leadership. Omodei defeated Birney in a party room ballot held on 24 March 2006. The spill motion passed 17 votes to 16, and Omodei won the subsequent ballot 18 votes to 15. Omodei stated he would consider offering Birney a position on the Liberal front bench, but Birney remained on the back bench thereafter.

Birney's demise as WA Liberal leader was later echoed by that of South Australian Liberal leader Iain Evans a year later in 2007. Both Birney and Evans became their party's leaders following its defeat in the respective state elections only to be dumped a year later in a leadership coup. Birney became the first WA Liberal leader who did not lead the party to an election since the party's first leader, Ross McDonald.

== Later career ==
On 3 January 2008, Birney announced that he would be quitting politics for the corporate world, and duly retired at the 2008 state election.

On 24 August 2014, The Sunday Times reported that Birney was considering a return to state politics, quoting him as saying that he had "unfinished business". He said he would not challenge a sitting member for pre-selection.

As of 2026, his return to state politics has not eventuated.

From 2013 to 2016, he was the managing director of Birney Corporate Communications, a company he founded. He is the author and director of Bulls N' Bears, a joint venture between Business News and Birney Corporate Communications which provides news about ASX-listed companies. Birney also presents a Bulls N' Bears program of public company news and chief executive interviews on Perth radio station 6PR.

Political offices
Preceded by Colin Barnett	Leader of the Opposition; 2005 – 2006	Succeeded by Paul Omodei
Party political offices
Preceded by Colin Barnett	Leader of the Liberal Party in Western Australia; 2005 – 2006	Succeeded by Paul Omodei
