= Bill Young (Western Australian politician) =

Australian politician

Deputy Leader of the Country Party in Western Australia
- In office 17 July 1973 – 30 March 1974
- Preceded by: Ray McPharlin
- Succeeded by: Matt Stephens

Member of the Legislative Assembly of Western Australia
- In office 2 September 1967 – 30 March 1974
- Preceded by: Tom Hart
- Succeeded by: Geoff Grewar
- Constituency: Roe

Personal details
- Born: William Gordon Young; 28 August 1918 Nedlands, Western Australia
- Died: 21 April 2012 (aged 93) Wembley, Western Australia
- Party: Country (to 1974); National Alliance (1974)

William Gordon Young (28 August 1918 – 21 April 2012) was an Australian politician who was a Country Party member of the Legislative Assembly of Western Australia between 1967 and 1974, representing the seat of Roe.

Born in Perth to Alice (née Nicholls) and Arthur James Young, Young attended Claremont High School in the city's western suburbs. He then worked briefly as a clerk with an insurance agency, before going to the small Wheatbelt town of Kondinin to farm. He enlisted in the Royal Australian Air Force in November 1940, and as a flight lieutenant saw service in Egypt, Singapore, India, and Burma, flying bombers. Returning to Australia in March 1944, he was briefly stationed at RAAF Evans Head, a training school, and then worked for the Australian intelligence service until the war's end. While in Perth in May 1944, Young married Amy Doreen Pond, with whom he later had three children. A keen footballer, he played senior football for Claremont during the 1945 WANFL season, and continued with the Kondinin Football Club in the Merredin Districts Football League after returning there in late 1945.

Young was elected to the Kondinin Road Board (later the Shire of Kondinin) in 1954, and served as its chairman from 1959 until 1967, when he stood for the by-election in Roe necessitated by the resignation of the sitting Country member, Tom Hart. His only opponent was Liberal candidate Mel Bungey, who was later elected to the federal House of Representatives. Young's majority decreased at both the 1968 and 1971 state elections, and at the latter poll the final margin between him and the next-best candidate, independent Leonard Gleeson, was less than 200 votes – Young finished with 51.32% of the two-candidate preferred vote. Young was chairman of the state Country Party from 1971 and 1974, and in July 1973, following Sir Crawford Nalder's retirement, was elected deputy leader, replacing the new leader, Ray McPharlin. A member of various parliamentary committees, Young lost his seat to the Liberal candidate, Geoff Grewar, at the 1974 election. In a three-cornered contest between Labor, the Liberals, and the National Alliance (a brief merger of the Country Party and the Democratic Labor Party), Young received 43.35% on first preferences, but could only gain 48.24% of the final count as the vast majority of Labor preferences flowed to the Liberals. After leaving parliament, Young was chairman of the board of Claremont Teachers College (later the Western Australian College of Advanced Education), and was also involved with the National Parks Authority. He died in Wembley, a suburb of Perth, in April 2012, aged 93.
