= Geoff Grewar =

Australian politician

Member of the Legislative Assembly of Western Australia
- In office 30 March 1974 – 19 February 1983
- Preceded by: Bill Young
- Succeeded by: None (seat abolished)
- Constituency: Roe

Personal details
- Born: 12 June 1932 (age 94) North Adelaide, South Australia, Australia
- Party: Liberal

Geoffrey Royden "Geoff" Grewar (born 12 June 1932) is a former Australian politician who was a Liberal Party member of the Legislative Assembly of Western Australia from 1974 to 1983, representing the seat of Roe.

Grewar was born in Adelaide to Anna Matilda (née Weidenbach) and Cyril Mitchell Grewar. His family moved to Western Australia when he was a child, initially living in the country before eventually settling in Perth. Grewar attended Perth Boys School and Perth Modern School before going on to the University of Western Australia, where he studied agricultural science. After graduating, he moved to Esperance, where he initially worked for the state Department of Agriculture. Grewar later worked as a manager for a land development company and as a private consultant, as well as farming his own land. He was elected to the Esperance Shire Council in 1971, and served until 1974. Grewar entered parliament at the 1974 state election, defeating Bill Young (the sitting Country Party member) in the seat of Roe. He was re-elected at the 1977 and 1980 elections, but his seat was abolished in a redistribution prior to the 1983 election. Grewar attempted to transfer to the new seat of Esperance-Dundas, but was defeated by Julian Grill (the sitting Labor member for Yilgarn-Dundas, which had also been abolished).

Parliament of Western Australia
Preceded by Bill Young	Member for Roe; 1974–1983	Abolished
