= Albert Green (Australian politician) =

Australian politician (1869–1940)

The Honourable Albert Green
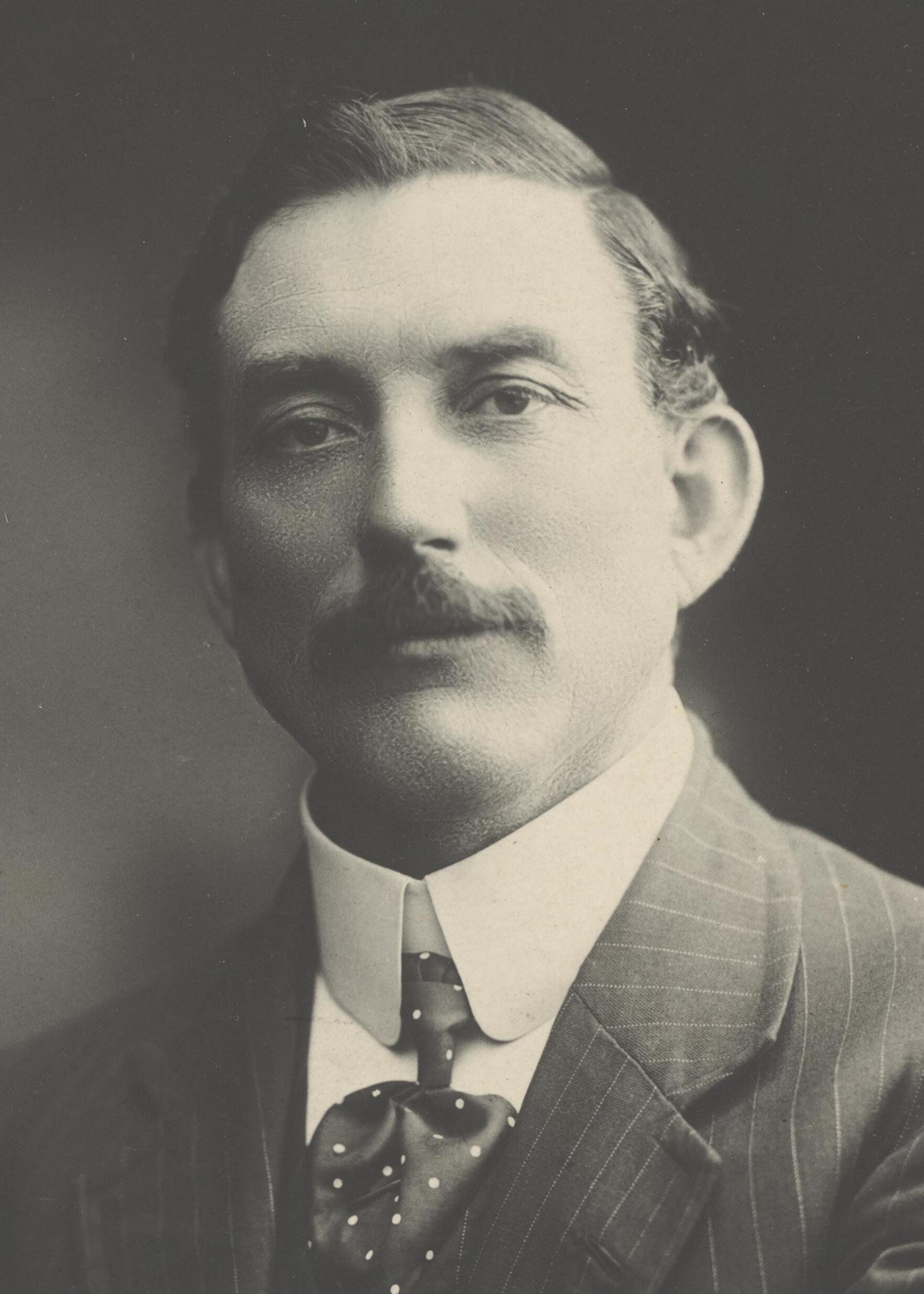

Postmaster-General of Australia
- In office 4 February 1931 – 6 January 1932
- Prime Minister: James Scullin
- Preceded by: Joseph Lyons
- Succeeded by: James Fenton

Minister for Defence
- In office 22 October 1929 – 4 February 1931
- Prime Minister: James Scullin
- Preceded by: William Glasgow
- Succeeded by: John Daly

Member of the Australian Parliament for Kalgoorlie
- In office 16 December 1922 – 2 October 1940
- Preceded by: George Foley
- Succeeded by: Herbert Johnson

Member of the Western Australian Parliament for Kalgoorlie
- In office 21 October 1914 – 12 March 1921
- Preceded by: George McLeod
- Succeeded by: John Boyland
- In office 3 October 1911 – 8 December 1913
- Preceded by: Norbert Keenan
- Succeeded by: George McLeod

Personal details
- Born: 21 December 1869 Avoca, Victoria, Australia
- Died: 2 October 1940 (aged 70) Kalgoorlie, Western Australia, Australia
- Party: Labor
- Spouse: Emily Elenor Berry (m. 1899)
- Occupation: Bricklayer; Trade unionist

Albert Ernest Green (21 December 1869 – 2 October 1940) was an Australian politician. He arrived in Western Australia in 1895, and represented the Kalgoorlie area in both state and federal parliaments for the Australian Labor Party, as well as serving as Minister for Defence and later Postmaster-General in the Scullin Ministry.

== Biography ==
Green was born and went to primary school in Avoca, Victoria, but left school to work for a telephone company in Ballarat and later in the family's bricklaying business. He travelled in the United States and Central America between 1889 and 1895 and as a result was known as "Texas". He was active in the brickmasons' society at San Francisco, and it was even suggested by one contemporary source that he had assisted revolutionary insurgents in Guatemala. In June 1895, he moved to Western Australia and established a branch of the Australian Natives' Association (A.N.A.) in Perth. In November 1895, he became a postal clerk in the gold rush town of Coolgardie. He was soon transferred to nearby Kalgoorlie, where he founded branches of the A.N.A. and the Post and Telegraphists' Union and became involved in local Labour politics.

== Political career ==
=== State politics ===
Green won the Western Australian Legislative Assembly seat of Kalgoorlie in the 1911 election, following the retirement of the independent member, Norbert Keenan. In December 1913, he resigned to seek pre-selection for the Federal seat of Kalgoorlie but lost to Hugh Mahon. He was re-elected to the state seat in October 1914 and held it to March 1921, when he was defeated by the independent Nationalist candidate John Boyland. Between March 1921 and December 1922 he worked for the Westralian Worker newspaper.

=== Federal politics ===
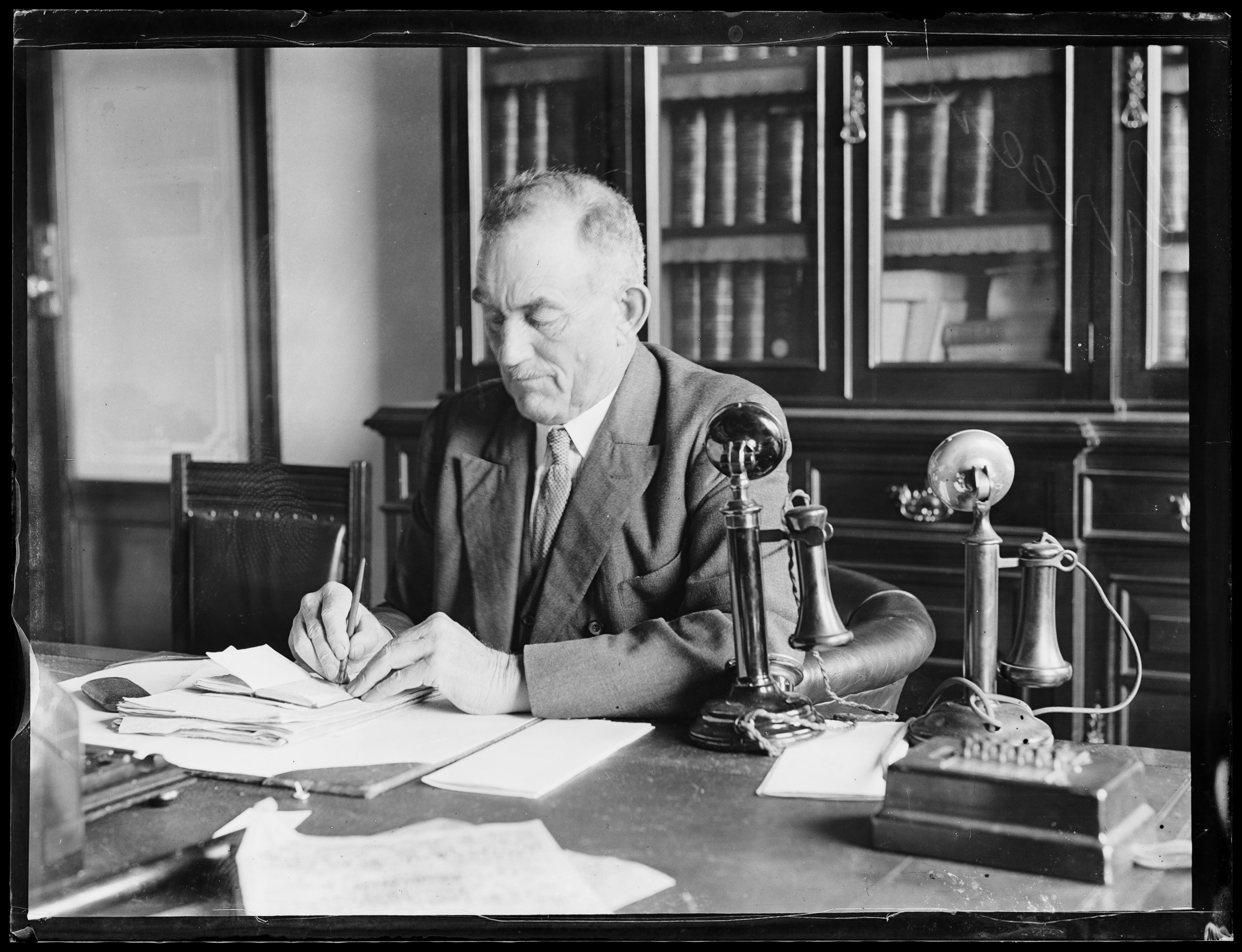
Green working at his desk, 1931

Green won the federal Kalgoorlie seat at the 1922 election, defeating the incumbent Nationalist member George Foley, and held it until his death. He campaigned for a strong air force and was appointed Minister for Defence in the Scullin government in October 1929. Despite the onset of the Great Depression, he implemented a training scheme for Australian pilots and purchased several aircraft. He also abolished compulsory military service. In February 1931, following the resignation of Joseph Lyons, he was appointed Postmaster-General and Minister for Works and Railways. He was upset by Lyons' defection from the Labor Party and, according to Geoffrey Bolton, Green chased Lyons' train along the Canberra railway station platform shouting "For God's sake, don't do it, Joe!" In opposition after the 1931 election, he campaigned for fellow Western Australian John Curtin to be elected party leader.

== Personal life ==
In 1899, Green married Emily Berry, with whom he had four children. He died at a private hospital in Kalgoorlie on 2 October 1940, aged 70.

Political offices
Preceded by William Glasgow	Minister for Defence; 1929–1931	Succeeded by John Daly
Preceded by Joseph Lyons	Postmaster-General; 1931–1932	Succeeded by James Fenton
Parliament of Australia
Preceded by George Foley	Member for Kalgoorlie; 1922–1940	Succeeded by Herbert Johnson
