= Peter Rundle =

Australian politician

Peter Rundle MLA

Deputy Leader of the Opposition
- In office 30 January 2023 – 25 March 2025
- Leader: Shane Love
- Preceded by: Shane Love
- Succeeded by: Libby Mettam

Deputy Leader of the Nationals WA
- Incumbent
- Assumed office 30 January 2023
- Preceded by: Shane Love

Member of the Western Australian Legislative Assembly for Roe
- Incumbent
- Assumed office 11 March 2017
- Preceded by: new seat

Personal details
- Born: 31 October 1962 (age 63) Katanning, Western Australia
- Party: Nationals

Peter James Rundle (born 31 October 1962) is an Australian politician. He has been a Nationals member of the Western Australian Legislative Assembly since the 2017 state election, representing Roe.

Rundle was a farmer at Katanning before entering politics. He served as chair of the Great Southern Development Commission in 2009, and as a member of the WA Regional Development Trust from 2011.

On 30 January 2023, Rundle was elected as deputy party leader and deputy leader of the opposition.

Western Australian Legislative Assembly
New seat	Member for Roe; 2017–present	Incumbent
