= 1967 Mount Marshall state by-election =

The 1967 Mount Marshall state by-election was a by-election held on 2 September 1967 for the Western Australian Legislative Assembly seat of Mount Marshall in the northeastern agricultural part of the state.

The by-election was triggered by the death of Country Party member George Cornell on 30 June 1967.

The seat of Mount Marshall, first established in 1930, was considered to be a safe seat for the Country Party. At the time of the by-election, the seat included the towns of Bencubbin, Dowerin, Kellerberrin, Koorda, Mukinbudin, Trayning and Wyalkatchem, as well as many smaller towns and settlements in the region.

== Timeline ==
Date	Event
30 June 1967	George Cornell died, vacating the seat of Mount Marshall.
2 August 1967	The Minister for Justice, Arthur Griffith, appointed polling places in the district.
4 August 1967	Writs were issued by the Speaker of the Legislative Assembly to proceed with a by-election.
11 August 1967	Close of nominations and draw of ballot papers.
2 September 1967	Polling day, between the hours of 8am and 6pm.
18 September 1967	The writ was returned and the results formally declared.

== Candidates ==
The by-election attracted three candidates. Ray McPharlin, representing the Country Party, was a farmer from Dalwallinu who had served on the Dalwallinu shire council from 1958 until 1964. Bill McNee, representing the Liberal and Country League, had farmed at Wyalkatchem and Koorda and was at different times president of both towns' Liberal branches. Djordje Miličić represented the Labor Party.

== Results ==
Ray McPharlin retained the seat for the Country Party. No swings are noted due to the seat being uncontested at the 1965 election.

Mount Marshall state by-election, 1967
Party	Candidate	Votes	%	±%
Country	Ray McPharlin	2,662	64.21	
Liberal	Bill McNee	1,010	24.36	
Labor	Djordje Miličić	474	11.43	
Total formal votes		4,146	98.55	
Informal votes		61	1.45	
Turnout		4,207	80.89	
Country hold		Swing	N/A	
