= James Cunningham (Australian politician) =

Australian politician (1879–1943)

The Honourable James Cunningham
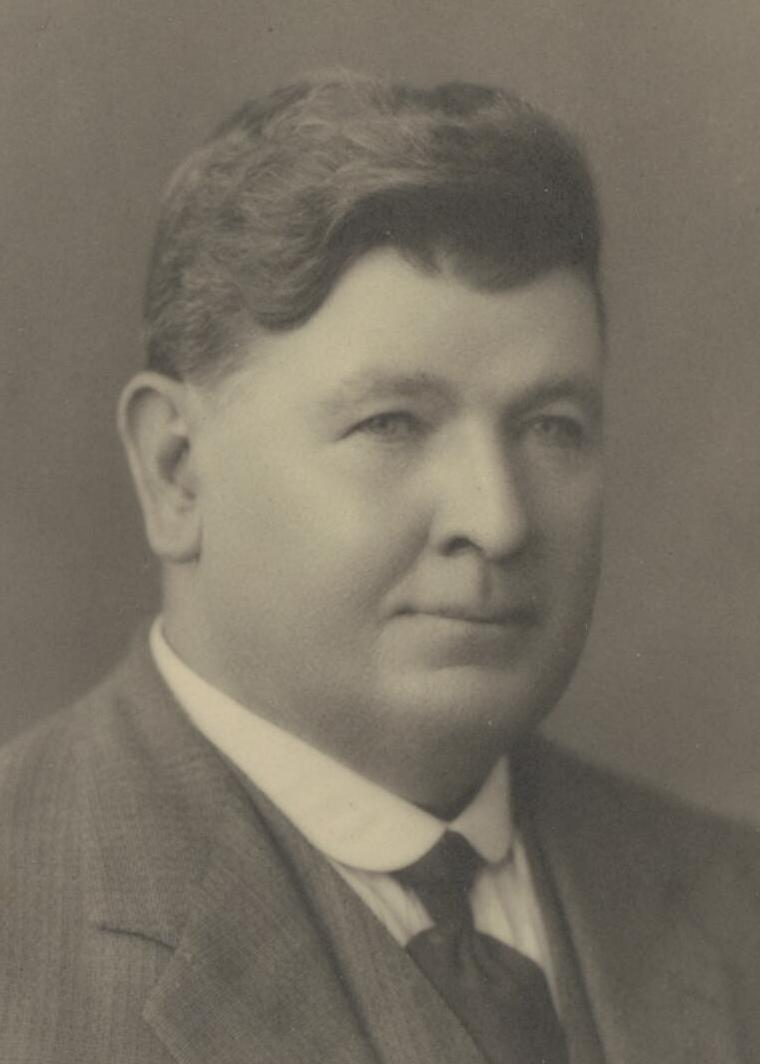

President of the Senate
- In office 1 July 1941 – 4 July 1943
- Preceded by: John Hayes
- Succeeded by: Gordon Brown

Senator for Western Australia
- In office 23 October 1937 – 4 July 1943
- Preceded by: Thomas Marwick

Member of the Western Australian Legislative Assembly
- In office 13 January 1923 – 15 February 1936
- Constituency: Kalgoorlie

Member of the Western Australian Legislative Council
- In office 7 July 1916 – 21 May 1922
- Constituency: North-East Province

Personal details
- Born: 28 December 1879 Wirrabara, South Australia, Australia
- Died: 4 July 1943 (aged 63) Albury, New South Wales, Australia
- Party: Labor
- Spouse: Alice Daly (m. 1907)
- Occupation: Goldminer

James Cunningham (28 December 1879 – 4 July 1943) was an Australian politician. He was a member of the Australian Labor Party (ALP) and began his political career in the Parliament of Western Australia, serving as a state government minister. He later served as a Senator for Western Australia from 1937 until his death in 1943, including as President of the Senate from 1941.

== Early life ==
Cunningham was born on 28 December 1879 at Wirrabara, South Australia. He was the son of Catherine (née Herrin) and James Cunningham, and had five brothers. At the time of his birth, his parents were illiterate, with his father working as a farmer and stonemason and his mother working as a domestic servant.

Cunningham had little formal education. He was raised in Melrose, South Australia, but he and his father moved to Western Australia during the gold rushes of the 1890s. He worked as a miner and prospector around the remote mining settlement of Laverton, where he was secretary of the Laverton Miners' Union. He also ran a bakery at the Hawkes Nest gold mine for a period. By 1899 Cunningham was living at Norseman. He moved to Boulder in 1905.

== State politics ==
Cunningham was an unsuccessful candidate for ALP preselection prior to the 1911 state election, losing to the incumbent Labor MP George "Mulga" Taylor in the Goldfields seat of Mount Margaret.

Cunningham was secretary of the Federated Miners' Union before his election to the Western Australian Legislative Council in 1916 as a Labor member. In 1922 he left the council, but in 1923 he was elected to the Western Australian Legislative Assembly as the member for Kalgoorlie. He was an honorary minister 1924–1927 and held the portfolios of Minister for Agriculture, Minister for Goldfields and Minister for Water Supply 1927–1930. His alcoholism prevented him being reappointed to the Ministry in 1933 when Labor regained office.

In 1936 the Labor Party decided to allow three candidates to stand for the seat of Kalgoorlie, after irregularities were discovered in the pre-selection ballotting process. Cunningham was soundly defeated.

== Federal politics ==
Cunningham was elected to the Senate at the 1937 federal election, to a six-year term beginning on 1 July 1938. In accordance with electoral legislation at the time, he was also declared elected to the casual vacancy caused by the death of Country Party senator William Carroll, which had been filled by Thomas Marwick as an interim appointee. He therefore began his Senate term on 23 October 1937, the date of the election.

In the Senate, Cunningham "spoke lucidly on electoral reform, the rights of Western Australia under the federal system and the struggles of local primary producers, especially wheat farmers and goldminers". He was part of the "strong network of moderate views and personal loyalty which bound together the leading members of the Labor Party in Western Australia". He was a personal representative of ALP leader John Curtin, who occupied a Western Australian seat, at meetings of the ALP federal executive, and from 1940 to 1941 served on the Western Australian War Industries Committee.

Cunningham was elected as the ALP's deputy Senate leader on 14 October 1940, following the 1940 election. He was elected President of the Senate on 1 July 1941, serving until his death in Albury, New South Wales, on 4 July 1943. He was buried in Karrakatta Cemetery, Perth, after a state funeral.

== Personal life ==
In 1907, Cunningham married Alice Daly, with whom he had three surviving children. He had difficulties with alcohol throughout his parliamentary career and also suffered from silicosis from his time as a miner.

Parliament of Australia
Preceded by John Hayes	President of the Senate; 1941–1943	Succeeded by Gordon Brown
