= Tom Hart (Australian politician) =

Australian politician

Member of the Legislative Assembly of Western Australia
- In office 31 March 1962 – 30 June 1967
- Preceded by: Charles Perkins
- Succeeded by: Bill Young
- Constituency: Roe

Personal details
- Born: 27 November 1904 Ballarat, Victoria, Australia
- Died: 14 December 1972 (aged 68) Albany, Western Australia, Australia
- Party: Country

Thomas George Hart (27 November 1904 – 14 December 1972) was an Australian farmer and politician who was a Country Party member of the Legislative Assembly of Western Australia from 1962 to 1967, representing the seat of Roe.

Hart was born in Ballarat, Victoria, and spent his early life as a butcher in Geelong West. He moved to Western Australia in 1929 and took up land at Ongerup, in the state's Great Southern region. Hart became prominent in agricultural circles, serving as a director and vice-chairman of Co-operative Bulk Handling, as a farmers' union official, and on the board of the state marketing board for barley. He also served on the Gnowangerup Road Board from 1946 to 1957. Hart entered parliament at the 1962 state election, replacing the retiring Charles Perkins in Roe, a Country Party safe seat. He was re-elected at the 1965 election, but resigned from parliament in June 1967 after a little over five years in office. Hart eventually retired to Albany, dying there in December 1972, aged 68. He had married Vivien Bertha Bridgeman in 1928, with whom he had five children.

Parliament of Western Australia
| Preceded by Charles Perkins | Member for Roe; 1962–1967 | Succeeded by Bill Young |
