= John Bowler (politician) =

Australian politician (born 1949)

John Bowler MLA

Member of the Western Australian Legislative Assembly
- In office 10 February 2001 – 9 March 2013
- Preceded by: Julian Grill
- Constituency: Eyre (2001-2005); Murchison-Eyre (2005-2008); Kalgoorlie (2008-2013)

Minister for Local Government
- In office 13 December 2006 – 2 March 2007
- Premier: Alan Carpenter
- Preceded by: Jon Ford
- Succeeded by: Ljiljanna Ravlich
- In office 10 March 2005 – 3 February 2006
- Premier: Geoff Gallop; Alan Carpenter
- Preceded by: Ljiljanna Ravlich
- Succeeded by: Jon Ford

Personal details
- Born: John James Mansell Bowler; 22 September 1949 (age 76) Kalgoorlie, Western Australia
- Party: Labor (2001-2006); Independent (2006-2013)
- Profession: Journalist

John James Mansell Bowler (born 22 September 1949) is an Australian former politician who was a member of the Western Australian Legislative Assembly from 2001 to 2013.

Bowler, then a member of the Labor Party, was elected to the legislature from the former seat of Eyre in 2001. He transferred to Murchison-Eyre in 2005, and was appointed as Minister for Local Government and Regional Development, Land Information, Goldfields-Esperance and Great Southern following the re-election of the Labor Government at that year's election and added the Sport and Recreation portfolio in November 2005.

In February 2006, following the election of Alan Carpenter as premier, he was promoted to the portfolios of Resources and Assisting the Minister for State Development; Employment Protection, Goldfields-Esperance and Great Southern.

In December 2006 his portfolios were again reallocated, and he became Minister for Local Government; Employment Protection; Racing and Gaming; Goldfields-Esperance and Great Southern.

Only weeks later, however, Bowler became embroiled in a growing scandal when the Corruption & Crime Commission (CCC) alleged that he had leaked confidential Cabinet information relating to Fortescue Metals Group to disgraced lobbyists and former politicians Julian Grill and Brian Burke. The CCC also alleged that he leaked a draft parliamentary committee report prior to becoming a Minister. He was subsequently asked to resign from both Cabinet and the Labor Party. Despite calls from Premier Alan Carpenter for his resignation, Bowler remained in Parliament as an independent and won the seat of Kalgoorlie as an independent at the 2008 election.

Bowler indicated that he would support the minority Liberal Party government on issues not affecting his electorate.

In September 2009 the CCC reported on its earlier allegations of Bowler leaking Cabinet secrets. The CCC concluded that the information Bowler released could not in fact be considered confidential and that his actions in this instance did not amount to misconduct. His former chief of staff, Simon Corrigan, was also exonerated.

In November 2009 the CCC released its final report into Bowler in relation to BHP's Yeelirrie uranium deposit. The report contained an opinion of serious misconduct against Bowler for agreeing to delay terminating an application over BHP's land by Precious Metals Australia, at the request of Brian Burke and Julian Grill.

Bowler retired from parliament in 2013 and now supports the WA Nationals, being involved with the 2013 state election campaign of Wendy Duncan, MLA for Kalgoorlie, and the campaign of Chub Witham for the seat of O'Connor at the 2013 federal election.

In October 2015, Bowler easily won election as the mayor of Kalgoorlie.

Western Australian Legislative Assembly
Preceded by Julian Grill	Member for Eyre; 2001–2005	Succeeded by Seat abolished
Preceded by Seat re-created	Member for Murchison-Eyre; 2005–2008	Succeeded by Seat abolished
Preceded by Matt Birney	Member for Kalgoorlie; 2008–2013	Succeeded by Wendy Duncan
