= Electoral district of Kalgoorlie =

State electoral district of Western Australia

Kalgoorlie Western Australia—Legislative Assembly
- Interactive map of electoral district boundaries from the 2025 state election
- State: Western Australia
- Dates current: 1901–present
- MP: Ali Kent
- Party: Labor
- Namesake: Kalgoorlie
- Electors: 19,651 (2021)
- Area: 555,549 km^{2} (214,498.7 sq mi)
- Demographic: Rural
Electorates around Kalgoorlie:
Mid-West	Kimberley	South Australia
Central Wheatbelt	Kalgoorlie	South Australia
Roe	Great Australian Bight	Great Australian Bight

Kalgoorlie is an electoral district of the Legislative Assembly in the Australian state of Western Australia.

The district includes not only the town of Kalgoorlie, but significant parts of the outback in central and eastern Western Australia.

Long a Labor stronghold, the district was lost to the Liberal Party at the 2001 state election. The new Liberal member, Matt Birney, was re-elected at the 2005 state election. The district then proceeded to change hands at every election until the 2025 state election where incumbent Labor MP Ali Kent retained the seat for the first time in 20 years.

== History ==
The district of Kalgoorlie was first created for the 1901 state election and has continued to exist as an electorate ever since. Over its first 100 years it was always represented by the Labor Party with the exception of two interruptions between 1905 and 1911 and 1921 and 1923. For most of the time after 1923, it was a reasonably safe Labor seat.

However, it became far less safe for Labor during the 1990s amid demographic changes in the city of Kalgoorlie. Labor lost the seat in 2001 when Liberal candidate Matt Birney defeated incumbent MP Megan Anwyl at the 2001 state election. Oddly, this was also an election that brought Labor into government. Indeed, Anwyl was the only Labor MP to lose her seat at that election. However, as a measure of how the ground had shifted from under Labor, Anwyl only led Birney by eight votes on the first count, and lost when One Nation preferences flowed overwhelmingly to Birney.

Birney was re-elected at the 2005 state election with a large swing even as the Labor government was convincingly reelected. He retired at the 2008 state election. Upon Birney's retirement, the seat was won by independent candidate and former Labor MLA John Bowler, the former member for Murchison-Eyre. Bowler held the seat for one term before retiring at the 2013 state election when the seat was won by Nationals MLC Wendy Duncan.

Duncan also only held the seat for only one term before retiring ahead of the 2017 state election which allowed Kyran O'Donnell to gain the seat for the Liberal Party. This marked the second time, after the 2001 state election, that the Liberal Party won the seat at an election as it lost government. O'Donnell held the seat for only one term before being swept out by Labor's Ali Kent in 2021 amid the massive Labor wave that swept through Western Australia. Though she did record a large swing against her, Kent was reelected in 2025. She was facing a crowded conservative field including a Liberal and a National candidates, as well as her predecessor running as an independent.

== Geography ==
For most of its history, the seat was a relatively compact seat based on its namesake, the town of Kalgoorlie. A redistribution ahead of the 2008 state election saw a significant expansion of the seat to include remote areas to the north and north-east of the town. This was made necessary by one vote, one value electoral reform which meant that, where previously all non-metropolitan districts could have significantly lower enrolment than their metropolitan (i.e. Perth) counterparts, now the only districts permitted to contain low enrolment are those that cover vast geographical areas. So whilst most of its population is based in the town of Kalgoorlie, the district also includes remote communities such as Eucla, Laverton, Leinster, Leonora and Menzies.

== Members for Kalgoorlie ==
Member	Party	Term
William Johnson	Labour	1901–1905
Norbert Keenan	Ministerial	1905–1911
Albert Green	Labour	1911–1913
George McLeod	Labor	1914
Albert Green	Labor	1914–1921
John Boyland	Ind. Nationalist	1921–1922
James Cunningham	Labor	1923–1936
Herbert Styants	Labor	1936–1956
Tom Evans	Labor	1956–1980
Ted Evans	Labor	1980–1981
Ian Taylor	Labor	1981–1996
Megan Anwyl	Labor	1996–2001
Matt Birney	Liberal	2001–2008
John Bowler	Independent	2008–2013
Wendy Duncan	National	2013–2017
Kyran O'Donnell	Liberal	2017–2021
Ali Kent	Labor	2021–present

== Election results ==
2025 Western Australian state election: Kalgoorlie
Party	Candidate	Votes	%	±%
Labor	Ali Kent	5,110	34.4	−17.6
Liberal	Rowena Olsen	3,081	20.7	−3.9
National	Tony Herron	2,277	15.3	+3.4
Independent	Kyran O'Donnell	1,931	13.0	+13.0
Legalise Cannabis	Kelly Malcolm	706	4.7	+4.7
One Nation	Jordan Whitten	684	4.6	+1.0
Greens	Donald Shane Clarke	580	3.9	+1.7
Christians	Ross G. Patterson	307	2.1	+2.1
Shooters, Fishers, Farmers	Stefan Colagiuri	199	1.3	−1.8
Total formal votes		14,875	95.0	−1.1
Informal votes		787	5.0	+1.1
Turnout		15,662	71.9	−3.0
Two-party-preferred result
Labor	Ali Kent	7,655	51.6	−9.6
Liberal	Rowena Olsen	7,188	48.4	+9.6
Labor hold		Swing	−9.6	
