= Electoral district of Roe =

State electoral district of Western Australia

Roe Western Australia—Legislative Assembly
- Interactive map of electoral district boundaries from the 2025 state election
- State: Western Australia
- Dates current: 1950–1983; 1989–2008; 2017–present
- MP: Peter Rundle
- Party: National
- Namesake: John Septimus Roe
- Electors: 28,297 (2025)
- Area: 120,414 km^{2} (46,492.1 sq mi)
- Demographic: Provincial and rural
- Coordinates: 33.09°S 119.68°E
Electorates around Roe:
Central Wheatbelt	Central Wheatbelt; Kalgoorlie	Kalgoorlie
Collie-Preston; Warren-Blackwood	Roe	Kalgoorlie
Albany; Great Australian Bight	Great Australian Bight	Great Australian Bight

Roe is an electoral district of the Legislative Assembly of Western Australia. It takes in rural areas in the south of the state. Roe was re-created for the 2017 state election, having previously been in existence from 1950 to 1983 and from 1989 to 2008. It had a notional 16.7-point majority for the National Party against the Liberal Party, based on the results of the 2013 state election.

== Geography ==
In its current incarnation, Roe includes portions of four regions of Western Australia – the South West, the Wheatbelt, the Great Southern and Goldfields-Esperance. There are eighteen local government areas that fall into the district: Broomehill-Tambellup, Cranbrook, Cuballing, Dumbleyung, Esperance, Gnowangerup, Katanning, Kent, Kojonup, Kulin, Lake Grace, Narrogin, Ravensthorpe, Wagin, West Arthur, Wickepin, Williams and Woodanilling.

== History ==
Roe was first created in 1950 and abolished in 1983. It was recreated in 1989. In both of its previous incarnations, it was a staunchly conservative seat that traded hands between the Liberal Party and what became the National Party. Indeed, in its second incarnation, Labor was frequently pushed into third place.

Roe was abolished ahead of the 2008 state election as a result of the reduction in rural seats made necessary by the one vote one value reforms. At its abolition in 2008, Roe was a southern coastal electorate that included the towns of Esperance, Gnowangerup, Kulin, Lake Grace, Bremer Bay and Ravensthorpe. Its former territory was split between the new district of Eyre and the enlarged district of Wagin. Following Roe's abolition, sitting Liberal MP Graham Jacobs contested and won the seat of Eyre.

Roe was re-created in a redistribution prior to the 2017 state election, taking in areas of two abolished seats, Eyre and Wagin. The former member for Eyre, Jacobs, attempted to transfer here, but was roundly defeated by the Nationals' Peter Rundle.

== Members for Roe ==
Roe (1950–1983)
Member	Party	Term
Charles Perkins	Country	1950–1962
Tom Hart	Country	1962–1967
Bill Young	Country	1967–1974
Geoff Grewar	Liberal	1974–1983
Roe (1989–2008)
Member	Party	Term
Ross Ainsworth	National	1989–2005
Graham Jacobs	Liberal	2005–2008
Roe (2017–present)
Member	Party	Term
Peter Rundle	National	2017–present

== Election results ==
2025 Western Australian state election: Roe
Party	Candidate	Votes	%	±%
National	Peter Rundle	12,502	53.3	+10.2
Liberal	Marie O'Dea	4,047	17.3	+2.9
Labor	Brad Willis	3,014	12.9	−15.8
One Nation	Ethann Sinclair	1,985	8.5	+6.7
Greens	David John Worth	1,306	5.6	+1.9
Christians	Diana Reymond	596	2.5	+0.2
Total formal votes		23,450	96.3	+0.2
Informal votes		895	3.7	−0.2
Turnout		24,345	86.0	+1.4
Two-candidate-preferred result
National	Peter Rundle	17,598	75.1	+12.9
Liberal	Marie O'Dea	5,846	24.9	+24.9
National hold				
