= List of Perth Modernians =

This is a list of Perth Modernians, the notable alumni of Perth Modern School, an academically-selective co-educational public high school located in Subiaco, an inner city suburb of Perth, Western Australia.

Perth Modern School alumni have received more top Order of Australia honours, than the alumni of any other school in Western Australia.

== Heads of state ==
=== Viceroys ===
- Sir Phillip Bennett, AC – Governor of Tasmania
- Sir Paul Hasluck (1909–1993) – 17th Governor-General of Australia
- Malcolm McCusker, AC – 31st Governor of Western Australia
- Ken Michael, AC – 30th Governor of Western Australia
- Sir Albert Wolff (1899–1977) – Lieutenant Governor of Western Australia

== Government ==
=== Heads of government ===
- Bob Hawke (1929–2019), AC – 23rd Prime Minister of Australia
- Alexander Donald Taylor – Deputy Premier of Western Australia & Tonkin Ministry 1971–1974, Western Australia

=== Executive branch ===
==== Cabinet ====
- Kim Edward Beazley (1917–2007) – Minister for Education 1972–1975, Australia
- Joe Berinson – Burke Ministry 1983–1986, Dowding Ministry 1986–1990 & Lawrence Ministry 1991–1993, Western Australia
- Ron Davies (1926–2011) – Tonkin Ministry 1971–1974 & Burke Ministry 1983–1986, Western Australia
- Julian Grill – Burke Ministry 1983–1986 & Dowding Ministry 1986–1990, Western Australia
- Sir Paul Hasluck (1905–1993) – Minister for Home Affairs 1951–1963, Minister for Defence 1963–1964, Minister for Foreign Affairs 1964–1969, Australia
- Judyth Watson – Lawrence Ministry 1991–1993, Western Australia
- Daryl Williams – Attorney-General of Australia 1996–2003, Minister for Justice 1996–1997, Minister for Communications, Information Technology and the Arts 2003–2004, Australia
- Ray Young (1938–2001) – Court Ministry 1977–1982, O'Connor Ministry 1982–1983, Western Australia

==== Other executives ====
- Wilson Tuckey – Second Howard Ministry and Third Howard Ministry, Australia
- John Wheeldon (1929–2006) – Australian Senator for Western Australia, Third Whitlam Ministry, Australia

=== Legislative branch ===
- Adair Macalistar Blain (1894–1983) – Australian Senator for Northern Territory
- Richard Cleaver (1917–2006) – MHR, Australia
- Howard Olney – MLC, Western Australia
- John Stone – Australian Senator for Queensland
- Peter Watson – MLA, Western Australia
- Laurie Wilkinson (1903–1991) – Australian Senator for Western Australia

=== Judicial branch ===
==== Presiding judges ====
- Alan Barblett (1929–2013) – Deputy Chief Justice of the Family Court of Australia, Acting Justice of the Supreme Court of Western Australia
- Sir Albert Wolff (1899–1977) – Chief Justice of Western Australia

==== Judges, superior courts ====
- Geoffrey Miller – Justice of the Court of Appeal Western Australia, Justice of the Supreme Court of Western Australia
- Roy Nevile (1904–1970) – Justice of the Supreme Court of Western Australia
- Howard Olney – Justice of the Federal Court of Australia, Justice of the Supreme Court of WA, Acting Justice of the Supreme Court of the NT
- David Tonge (1933–2008) – Justice of the Family Court of Australia

=== Military ===
==== Chiefs of services ====
- Sir Phillip Bennett, AC, DSO, KBE, LOM – General, first Chief of the Australian Defence Force
- David Leach (1928–2020), AC – Vice-Admiral, Chief of the Royal Australian Navy
- Sheila McClemans, OBE (1909–1988) – Chief Officer of the Women's Royal Australian Naval Service
- Laurie O'Donnell, AC – Lieutenant General, Chief of the Australian Army

==== Air, flag, and general officers ====
- Alfred Baxter-Cox (1898–1958) – Brigadier, Australian Army
- Ron Grey, DSO – Major General, Australian Army
- Charles Lloyd (1899–1956) – Major General, Australian Army, Chief of Staff during the Siege of Tobruk, Chief of Mission for the United Nations Korean Reconstruction Agency 1951–1953
- Allan Walters, CBE, AFC (1905–1968) – Air Vice Marshall, Royal Australian Air Force, Head of the Australian Joint Services Staff in Washington DC 1952–1953

==== Others – military ====
- William Geoffrey Chandler, MBE, (1908–1994) – Major, Australian Army
- Ralph Honner, DSO, MC, (1904–1994) – Lieutenant Colonel, Australian Army, distinguished commanding officer in World War II
- Leslie Ernest Le Souef, OBE, MDLRF, (1900–1996) – Lieutenant-Colonel, Australian Army
- Charles Edward Maurice Lloyd, CBE, (1899–1956) – Colonel, Australian Army
- Frederick Byro Nairn, ED, (1916–1986) – Major, Australian Army

=== Public service ===
==== Public servants ====
- H.C. "Nugget" Coombs (1906–1997) – first Governor of the Reserve Bank of Australia, Governor & Chairman of Commonwealth Bank, Chairman of the Council for the Arts and of the Council for Aboriginal Affairs, Hackett Scholar
- Ross Garnaut (born 1946) – senior advisor to the Australian Government, appointed by Kevin Rudd to write Garnaut Climate Change Review
- Ron Grey – Commissioner of Australian Federal Police
- Ken Michael, AC – Chairman of East Perth Redevelopment Authority, Commissioner of Main Roads Western Australia
- Sir Walter Scott, AC (1903–1981)- chairman of the Commonwealth Decimal Currency Committee & Board who implemented decimal currency in Australia in 1966
- John Stone – Secretary to the Treasury, Australia
- Ralph Slatyer, AC (1929–2012) – first Chief Scientist of Australia

==== Diplomats ====
- Ron Davies (1926–2011) – Agent-General London
- Ross Garnaut – Ambassador to China
- Sir Paul Hasluck (1905–1993) – delegate at San Francisco Conference 1945 which founded the United Nations, leading delegate of the Australian mission to the United Nations Security Council 1946
- Ralph Honner (1904–1994) – Ambassador to Ireland
- Ralph Slatyer, AC (1929–2012) – Ambassador to UNESCO

==== Politicians ====
- Margaret Battye (1909–1949) – Australian women's rights activist, first female court lawyer in Western Australia
- Bob Hawke, AC – President of Australian Council of Trade Unions
- Clarrie Isaacs (1948–2003) – Australian Aboriginal activist
- Rob Riley (1954–1996) – Australian Aboriginal activist
- Jessie Robertson (1909–1976) – State president of the National Council of Women 1956–1959 & 1966–1972, of the Australian-Asian Association (1960–1965), international president of the Pan-Pacific and South East Asia Women's Association 1961–1964; co-founder of Association of Western Australia 1947, the Soroptimist Club of Perth 1958, King Edward Memorial Hospital auxiliary 1958, and of the women's auxiliary of the Country and Democratic League 1957 and was president 1961–1964
- Vincent Serventy (1917–2007) – established world first nature conservation day, now Earth Day, Commissioner of Australian Heritage Commission, President of Wildlife Preservation Society of Australia, and founder of WA National Trust, WA Tree Society, WA Gould League of Birdlovers

==== Others – public service ====
- Sheila McClemans (1909–1988) – first female barrister before the WA Supreme Court, co-founder of the first all-female law firm in WA
- Jessie Robertson (1909–1976) – State president of the National Council of Women 1956–1959 & 1966–1972, of the Australian-Asian Association (1960–1965), international president of the Pan-Pacific & South East Asia Women's Association 1961–1964; and president of the women's auxiliary of the Country and Democratic League 1961–1964

== Academia and science ==
=== Chancellors and Vice-Chancellors ===
- H.C. "Nugget" Coombs (1906–1997) – fourth Chancellor of Australian National University 1968–1975, Hackett Scholar
- Ross Garnaut – Vice-Chancellor's Fellow, University of Melbourne
- John Hay, AC – Vice-Chancellor and President, University of Queensland, Deakin University; Senior Deputy Vice-Chancellor, Monash University, Hackett Scholar
- John de Laeter (1933–2010) – Deputy Vice-Chancellor Research and Development, Curtin University
- Marcus Liveris (1931–2011) – Deputy Vice-Chancellor of Health Sciences, Curtin University
- Ken Michael, AC – Chancellor, University of Western Australia
- Sir Fred Schonell (1900–1969) – Vice-Chancellor, University of Queensland, Hackett Scholar
- Sir Walter Scott, AC (1903–1981) – Chancellor of the International Academy of Management
- Sir Hector Stewart (1901–1979) — Pro-Chancellor, University of Western Australia, and co-founder of School of Medicine

=== Chairs ===
- David Black – Professor of History and Politics, Curtin University
- Brian De Garis – Professor of History, Murdoch University
- John Robert de Laeter (1933–2010) – Professor of Physics, Curtin University
- Ross Garnaut – Professor of Economics, Australian National University
- John La Nauze (1911–1990) – Professor of History, Australian National University, University of Melbourne; Professor of Australian Studies, Harvard University
- Ralph Slatyer, AC (1929–2012) – foundation Professor of Environmental Biology at the Research School of Biological Sciences, Australian National University
- Tom Stannage (1944–2012) – Professor of History, Curtin University, University of Western Australia
- Eric John Underwood (1905–1980) – Professor of Agriculture, University of Western Australia, Hackett Scholar

=== Other notable academics and scientists ===
- Dorothea Sandars – Parasitologist
- Patricia Woolley – zoologist, La Trobe University, in 1992 searched and found Julia Creek dunnart, Sminthopsis douglasi, a marsupial species thought to be extinct

=== Rhodes Scholars ===
- 1926: Karl Allen
- 1927: Keith Leo Cooper
- 1928: Alfred Smith
- 1931: John La Nauze
- 1932: Joe Starke
- 1933: Arthur Finn
- 1937: Edward Barr
- 1938: Harry Ross Anderson
- 1939: Edmund Ernest Jarvis
- 1951: John Stone
- 1952: John Robert Hall
- 1953: Bob Hawke
- 1962: Brian De Garis
- 1965: Daryl Williams
- 2027: Fatima Merchant

== Art, entertainment and media ==
=== Artists ===
- Peter Bladen (1922–2001) – poet, sketch-writer The Mavis Bramston Show
- John Ewers (1904–1978) – writer, With the Sun on My Back, first President of the Fellowship of Australian Writers (WA) 1938–1939 & 1946–1947
- Rolf Harris (1930–2023) – painter & variety entertainer, commissioned to paint portrait of Queen Elizabeth II, & later convicted of sex offences
- John Hepworth (1921–1995) – writer, Nation Review magazine
- Katherine Langford – actor
- Emma Matthews – lyric soprano, Opera Australia
- Geoffrey Michaels (1944–2024) – violinist
- Leslie Rees (1905–2000) – writer, Digit Dick
- Paul Ridge – musician, Drapht
- Victor Sangiorgio – pianist
- Vincent Serventy (1917–2007) – writer & film maker, Emeritus Fellow of the Australia Council Literature Board 1993
- Alan Seymour – playwright and author, The One Day of the Year
- Donald Stuart (1913–1983) – playwright and author, President of the Fellowship of Australian Writers
- Howard Taylor (1918–2001) – painter & sculptor, commissioned to create sculpture Compass and Perspective at Parliament House Canberra
- Johnny Young – entertainer, song writer and TV host

=== Entertainment and media ===
- Alan Bateman (1936–2012) – managing director of Seven Network, General Manager of Network Ten
- Irene Greenwood (1898–1992) – radio broadcaster and feminist and peace advocate
- Maxwell Newton (1929–1990) – first editor The Australian, editor Australian Financial Review, financial editor New York Post, publisher Melbourne Observer & reprinted Marvel Comics editions in Australia, Hackett Scholar
- Jessie Robertson (1909–1976) – 6IX radio programme host, "Aunt Judy"
- Malcolm Uren (1900–1973) – Editor-in-Chief, West Australian Newspapers

== Business ==
- Garrick Agnew (1930–1987) – founder of Robe River Mine, Chair of Agnew Clough
- Len Buckeridge (1936–2014) – founder of BGC
- Elizabeth Gaines – CEO of Fortescue
- Ross Garnaut – Chair of Bankwest, Lihir Gold, Primary Industry Bank of Australia
- Janet Holmes à Court, AC – Chair of Heytesbury, philanthropist
- Kevin Parry (1933–2010) – founder of Parry Corporation
- Sir Walter Scott, AC (1903–1981) – founder of WD Scott, co-founder & Chair of Australian Institute of Management

== Sport ==
- Sir Garrick Agnew (1930–1987) – swimming, London Olympics 1948, Helsinki Olympics 1952
- Alan Barblett (1929–2013) – hockey, Melbourne Olympics 1956
- Caitlin Bassett – Australian Netball Diamonds captain
- Brian Falconer – VFL footballer, Hawthorn
- Zoe Goss – international cricketer (Australia)
- Ern Henfry (1921–2007) – VFL footballer, Carlton premiership captain 1947, Victorian state captain – WA Hall of Champions 1993
- Anthony Jones – AFL footballer, Fremantle, Sandover Medal 2007
- Betty Judge-Beazley (1921–2015) – athletics world records holder, coach of Shirley Strickland, president of the Australian Women's Amateur Athletics Union
- Lawrence O’Donnell – Australian shooting team, NRA Bisley, United Kingdom
- Kevin Parry (1933–2010) – America's Cup, Parry's yacht Kookaburra III defeated Alan Bond's Australia IV 5-nil & then lost 4-nil to Dennis Connor's Stars & Stripes 87, Parry was also a WA state baseball player
- Tom Stannage (1944–2012) – WAFL footballer & WA state representative
- Ray Strauss (1927–2013) – Australian hockey player & first class cricketer
- Peter Watson – athletics, Mexico Olympics 1968

== See also ==
- List of schools in the Perth metropolitan area
