= Joseph Parsons =

Joseph or Joe Parsons may refer to:

- Joseph Parsons (educator), West Australian educator and principal of Perth Modern School
- Joseph Parsons (Vermont politician)
- Joseph Mitchell Parsons, American murderer
- Joseph Parsons Jr., settler and colonial leader in Northampton, Massachusetts
- Joe Parsons (snowmobiler), American snowmobiler
- Joe Parsons (West Virginia politician)
