= Brian Falconer =

Australian rules footballer (1933–2020)

Personal information
- Full name: Brian Terence Falconer
- Born: 2 June 1933; Perth, Western Australia
- Died: 4 April 2020 (aged 86)
- Original team: Perth Modern
- Height: 175 cm (5 ft 9 in)
- Weight: 76 kg (168 lb)
- Position: Wing

Playing career^{1}
| Years | Club | Games (Goals) |
| 1952–55 | West Perth | 62 (1) |
| 1956–60 | Hawthorn | 57 (7) |
| 1960s | Waverley | unknown |
- ^{1} Playing statistics correct to the end of 1960.

Brian Terence Falconer (2 June 1933 – 4 April 2020) was an Australian rules footballer who played for the West Perth Football Club in the Western Australian National Football League (WANFL) and the Hawthorn Football Club in the Victorian Football League (VFL). A wingman, Falconer was one of the few players to transfer from Western Australia to Victoria before the relaxation of transfer conditions, but retired at the age of 27 to concentrate on his career in the public service. He remained involved with Hawthorn after his retirement from playing, and worked to oppose the proposed merger with the Melbourne Football Club in the early 1990s.

== Football career ==
Falconer was born in Perth, Western Australia, and attended Perth Modern School, playing football for the school team, as well as in representative sides. He played for the North Perth team in the Metropolitan Junior Football Association (MJFA) before being recruited by West Perth, making his senior debut in 1952. In his first few seasons, Falconer was hampered by injury, missing a number of matches due to thigh and leg injuries during the 1953 and 1954 seasons. Having been an outstanding schoolboy cricketer, Falconer also played first-grade cricket for North Perth in the WACA District Cricket competition during the summer, batting left-handed. Outside of football, Falconer worked as a clerk at the Department of Supply, and was also a member of the Australian Army Reserve, with army training occasionally conflicting with games.

At the end of the 1955 season, Falconer was one of two players (the other being teammate Eddie Wylde) who were offered contracts by Hawthorn. West Perth coach Peter O'Donohue, who had previously captained Hawthorn, was involved in convincing Falconer to move to Melbourne, with an uncomplicated transfer between jobs in the Commonwealth Public Service also influential in his decision. The VFL's residency requirements meant Falconer was not able to play for the club until midway through the 1956 season. After a number of games for the reserves, in which he was a "star on the wing", according to The Argus, Falconer made his debut for Hawthorn in round twelve, against Collingwood. He played the remaining seven games of the season, and shared the club's "Best First Year Player" award with Brendan Edwards. Falconer established himself in Hawthorn's side in 1957, playing every game for the club, and was named the club's "Most Consistent Player" at the end of the season. In the first semi-final against Carlton, when much of the game was played during a hailstorm, he kicked a crucial goal right on the three-quarter time siren, having marked a soccer kick off the ground. A regular in the side throughout the following three seasons, Falconer's job restricted his ability to play in later seasons, and eventually forced his retirement from the club at the end of the 1960 season, although he did later play a handful of matches for Waverley in the Victorian Football Association (VFA).

== Later life ==
Falconer's work in the public service resulted in him moving to Canberra for a period of seventeen years, although he maintained a relationship with Hawthorn during that time, serving on the club's board in the 1960s and 1990s, and on the selection committee from 1965 to 1966. As a member of the committee of the Past Players and Officials Association, Falconer was active in opposing the proposed merger with Melbourne, and later headed the Membership Policy Committee that was involved in doubling the club's membership in the late 1990s. Having worn the number 36 jumper during his time at the club, Falconer is one of the players involved in the so-called "Curse of 36". His 57 games for the club are the most of any player to wear the number, with other players who have worn the jumper having had an atypical lack of success at senior level.
