= Dorothea Sandars =

Australian parasitologist

Academic background
- Education: University of Western Australia; University of London

Academic work
- Discipline: parasitology
- Main interests: fish parasites

Dorothea Sandars (1919–2002) was an Australian academic and parasitologist who specialised in fish parasites.

== Early life ==
Dorothea Fanny Sandars was born in Perth, Western Australia in 1919. She attended Perth Modern School. Sandars graduated with a BSc with Honours in 1943, earning a Hackett scholarship. She investigated gill parasites of fish in West Australian waters. She continued her studies graduating with her MSc from the University of Western Australia in 1944 and earned a Hackett research studentship.

== Career ==
Sandars continued her postgraduate research at the University of Adelaide and was a demonstrator in zoology under Professor T. Harvey Johnston. She investigated fish parasites from material collected from the second Mawson Antarctic Expedition of 1929-31. She became active on committees which looked at student housing for students of Western Australia at the University of Adelaide, forming the Westralia Club. She also volunteered with the Australian Red Cross during World War II.

Sandars was appointed to an assistant lecturer position at the University of Queensland in 1946, teaching zoology, reef ecology and parasitology. She was a member of the Marine Biological Station Committee, which later established the Heron Island Research Station. In 1950, Sandars was promoted to Senior Lecturer in parasitology, and also worked with the Queensland Institute of Medical Research (QIMR).

After being awarded the Ida Smedley Maclean Fellowship from the International Federation of University Women in 1954 Sandars spent a year in England studying at the London School of Hygiene & Tropical Medicine, earning her PhD from the University of London in 1956.

She was an active member of the Australian Federation of University Women and successfully lobbied for its 15th world conference to be held in Australia for the first time, in Brisbane in 1965 where she was the convenor of the event. She was Sub Dean of the Faculty of Science from 1971 to 1981, when she retired from the university. Sandars received an honorary PhD from the University of Queensland in 1995, in recognition of her long standing work for the University.

== Legacy ==
Before her death, Sandars and her friend, Irene Lee agreed to provide a legacy for researchers, by funding a number of scholarships through the Churchill Fellowship Trust.
