= State Bank of Victoria =

Bank in Victoria, Australia

- State Bank of Victoria logo, scanned from a letter dated January 1987
- Type: State-owned bank
- Industry: Banking
- Predecessor: Savings Bank of Port Philip
- Founded: 1 January 1842
- Defunct: 1990
- Fate: Acquired by Commonwealth Bank
- Successor: Commonwealth Bank of Australia
- Headquarters: Melbourne, Victoria, Australia
- Area served: Victoria, Australia
- Owner: Government of Victoria

The State Bank of Victoria was an Australian bank that existed from 1842 until 1990 when it was taken over by the Commonwealth Bank. It was owned by the State of Victoria.

== History ==
A government-controlled savings bank had been founded on 1 January 1842 as the Savings Bank of Port Philip. Other independent savings banks merged over time and this development was recognised by the Savings Banks Act 1912 (3 Geo. V. No. 2365), which reconstituted the banks as the State Savings Bank of Victoria. In 1980 its name was changed to the State Bank of Victoria, the name it had until its sale to the Commonwealth Bank in 1990 and subsequent dissolution.

The State Bank collapsed due to the weight of the grossly irresponsible lending made in the 1980s, in particular by its merchant bank subsidiary Tricontinental, after the Reserve Bank of Australia decision to increase interest rates in 1989 brought about the deep recession that put pressure on those financial institutions that were heavily exposed to the property market.

Another contributor to the State Bank's decline was its acquisition of the already troubled Australian Bank in January 1989.

Tricontinental eventually collapsed with losses of A$1.5 billion, which threatened the existence of the State Bank and led to its sale to the Commonwealth Bank. The overall sale price was A$2.0 billion.

The collapse of the State Bank was a key factor in the defeat of the State Labor government led by Joan Kirner and the election of the Liberal Party led by Jeff Kennett, at the 1992 Victorian state election.

== See also ==
- State Bank of South Australia
