= WD Scott =

Australian management consulting firm

WD Scott & Co is an Australian management consulting firm founded by Walter D. Scott in 1938 in Sydney. The company specialized in business process improvement and performance improvement. In 1966, Sir Walter Scott was appointed as the Chair of the Decimal Currency Board by the Prime Minister, and WDScott (now one word without a space) was appointed to oversee the implementation of decimal currency in Australia.

== History ==
WD Scott & Co was founded by Walter D. Scott in 1938 in Sydney, which was Australia's first management consultancy. In 1958, the company began operations in the United Kingdom. In 1984 the company merged with Coopers & Lybrand though it was reestablished as an independent trading company in 1993. The company was acquired by Reid Cormie Partners in 2003 but relaunched in 2004.

In 2007 WDScott re-launched the brand under WDScott Ltd, a public unlisted Australian corporation, with a new international board and a management team to lead the firm. The WDScott methodology and knowledge suite were re-vitalised and re-established within international academic and business communities. The firm acquired Australian management consultancy Clear Lead Pty Ltd in December 2007, and subsequently made several other mergers and acquisitions, including Global Justice Solutions. In 2010, WDScott merged with Distinct Consulting, an Ireland-based firm with expertise in the design and implementation of business intelligence and analytics-based solutions. The firm expanded to Australia, Europe, and the US. In 2011, the company had 50 people in Australia, and approximately 200 globally.

In 2013, WDScott's northern hemisphere business was acquired by multi-national firm FTI Consulting. FTI also bought the rights to the Distinct brand. The WDScott brand was retained by the Australian business.
