= Barbara MacLeod =

Australian naval officer

- Born: 15 February 1929; Bunbury, Western Australia
- Died: 9 January 2000 (aged 70); Mollymook, New South Wales
- Military career
- Allegiance: Australia
- Branch: Women's Royal Australian Naval Service
- Service years: 1953–1984
- Rank: Captain
- Commands: Women's Royal Australian Naval Service (1973–79)
- Awards: Member of the Order of Australia

Barbara Denise MacLeod, AM (15 February 1929 – 9 January 2000) was an Australian naval officer who served as director of the Women's Royal Australian Naval Service (WRANS).

Born in Bunbury, Western Australia, MacLeod graduated from the Western Australia Teachers College and taught primary school for two years. She joined the WRANS as an officer candidate in 1953, and over her years of service "served in every establishment where the WRANS were posted". She was the first woman to attend the Australian Administrative Staff College and, on appointment as Director of Navy Industrial Policy in 1979, became the first woman of captain's rank in the Royal Australian Navy to be appointed to a position typically reserved for a male captain. In 1982 she also became the first Australian woman to serve as aide-de-camp, to Queen Elizabeth II.

MacLeod was appointed a Member of the Order of Australia in 1975, and received the Queen Elizabeth II Silver Jubilee Medal.

Military offices
Preceded by Captain Joan Streeter	Director of the Women's Royal Australian Naval Service; 1973–1979	Succeeded by Commander June Baker
