= Margaret Battye =

Australian lawyer (1909–1949)

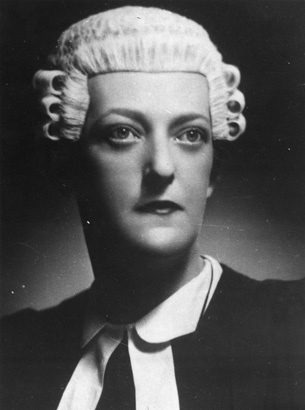
- Born: 9 August 1909; Subiaco, Western Australia
- Died: 16 November 1949 (aged 40); Subiaco, Western Australia
- Education: Perth Modern School; University of Western Australia
- Occupation: Lawyer

Margaret Battye (9 August 1909 – 16 November 1949) was an Australian barrister and jurist, who was one of the most influential women in politics, business and the legal advancement in Oceania. Battye was the first woman to represent a client and begin a legal practice in Western Australia, and she held a number of roles in the early history of the state's division of the Liberal Party of Australia.

== Biography ==
Margaret Battye was the only daughter of Nellie May, née Robertson, and Charles Battye, a librarian and brother of J. S. Battye. She was born in Subiaco, Western Australia, on 9 August 1909, and attended Perth Modern School before undertaking a law degree at the University of Western Australia. She obtained a Bachelor of Laws in 1931, and a postgraduate degree in 1933, the same year she was admitted to the bar. Battye was one of four women to emerge from the law school in 1930, the same year's graduates included Sheila McClemans. Her first case, judged in favour of her client, is given as the first time a woman gave a client representation in a West Australian court of law. The presiding magistrate and her opponent praised her conduct in presenting the case. Her establishment of a legal practice, along with a fellow graduate Mary Hartney, was another first for the women of that state.

Battye joined the Australian Federation of University Women in 1934 and became its president three years later. She continued to maintain her support for women at that institution, including drafting the constitution for the Women's University College (St Catherine's College). From 1936, she practised alone, as a barrister and solicitor, working for the Council for Civil Liberties from 1939. Her close association with the Women's Service Guilds included becoming that organisations honorary legal adviser. In 1939, she founded the Business and Professional Women's Club, and was a member and president of the Soroptomists' and Karrakatta Clubs.

Her involvement in politics included contributing to the founding of the state's division of the Liberal Party of Australia, and a sitting or founding member of the state and federal level committees within that party. Battye presided over the first State Woman's Council, founded in 1946 in Western Australia, in addition to chairing the Federal Women’s Committee. In 1949, she prepared a "blanket bill" designed to eliminate discrimination against women in Australian law, leading to reports and conferences, and a petition to the Prime Minister Ben Chifley. The Equal Citizenship (blanket) Bill was redirected to address state legislation, where the greater part of discrimination remained, although no bill would be passed for thirty years. Margaret Battye died of thyrotoxicosis in 1949.
