= Tricontinental (merchant bank) =

Bank in Victoria, Australia

Tricontinental Corporation
- Type: State-owned merchant bank
- Industry: Banking
- Founded: 30 May 1969
- Defunct: 1990
- Fate: Dissolved
- Headquarters: Melbourne, Victoria, Australia
- Area served: Victoria, Australia
- Owner: Government of Victoria

The Tricontinental Corporation, commonly known as Trico, was an Australian merchant bank that existed from 1969 until 1990. The State Bank of Victoria acquired an initial 25% stake in 1983 before buying out the remaining partners in 1985, giving the State of Victoria indirect 100% ownership.

== History ==
By the mid-1980s, Tricontinental was the largest merchant bank in Australia. Its ownership by the State Bank of Victoria made the SBV Group as a whole the largest regional bank in Australia at the time, and the fifth largest Australian bank overall.

The bank ceased to conduct new business from 21 May 1989, and was dissolved by the Government of Victoria as part of a condition of sale of the State Bank of Victoria to the Commonwealth Bank.

== Collapse ==
The Royal Commission into the Tricontinental Group of Companies found that between 1 July 1988 and 31 December 1990, Tricontinental's losses totalled $2,516.5 million. These losses generated in just 30 months were 37 times the profits earned in the previous three years.

More importantly, the losses generated by Tricontinental exceeded the entire State Bank of Victoria Group's capital base two times over. The Victorian taxpayer had to directly contribute $726.6 million of equity capital to Tricontinental, with the potential exposure at the time of the Royal Commission estimated to exceed $2,400.0 million.

Therefore the total cost of Tricontinental's losses on the Victorian taxpayer was estimated at $840 million, plus the loss of the State Bank of Victoria which had been sold to the Commonwealth Bank.

The collapse of the State Bank of Victoria was a key factor in the defeat of the State Labor government led by Joan Kirner and the election of the Liberal Party led by Jeff Kennett, at the 1992 Victorian state election.

== See also ==
- State Bank of Victoria
