= 3893 DeLaeter =

Main-belt asteroid

Discovery
- Discovered by: M. P. Candy
- Discovery site: Perth Obs.
- Discovery date: 20 March 1980

Designations
- Named after: John Robert de Laeter (Australian scientist)
- Alternative designations: 1980 FG_{12} · 1977 SX_{2} 1984 KE
- Minor planet category: main-belt · Phocaea; Hungaria · background

Orbital characteristics
- Epoch 4 September 2017 (JD 2458000.5)
- Uncertainty parameter 0
- Observation arc: 39.52 yr (14,435 days)
- Aphelion: 3.0626 AU
- Perihelion: 1.7817 AU
- Semi-major axis: 2.4221 AU
- Eccentricity: 0.2644
- Orbital period (sidereal): 3.77 yr (1,377 days)
- Mean anomaly: 255.66°
- Mean motion: 0° 15^{m} 41.4^{s} / day
- Inclination: 23.080°
- Longitude of ascending node: 196.76°
- Argument of perihelion: 107.58°

Physical characteristics
- Dimensions: 10.97±1.24 km 11.38±3.31 km 12.12±0.17 km 12.786±0.102 km 12.935±0.100 km 13.95 km (calculated)
- Synodic rotation period: 5.633±0.003 h (Note: Lightcurve plot of (3893) DeLaeter, at the Palmer Divide Station, Brian Warner (2014). Rotation period of 5.633±0.003 hours with a brightness amplitude of 0.13±0.02 mag. Quality Code of 2. Summary figures at the LCDB, not available at ADS.); 13.83±0.01 h
- Geometric albedo: 0.0573±0.0025; 0.059±0.002; 0.068±0.015; 0.07±0.03; 0.08±0.07
- Spectral type: S (assumed)
- Absolute magnitude (H): 13.0 · 13.10 · 13.2 · 13.30 · 13.31 · 13.37±0.24

3893 DeLaeter, provisional designation 1980 FG_{12}, is an asteroid from the inner regions of the asteroid belt, approximately 12 kilometers in diameter. It was discovered on 20 March 1980, by British astronomer Michael Candy at the Perth Observatory in Bickley, Australia. The asteroid was named after Australian scientist John Robert de Laeter.

== Orbit and classification ==
DeLaeter is a non-family asteroid of the main belt's background population when applying the Hierarchical Clustering Method to its proper orbital elements. The asteroid has also been considered a dynamical Hungaria asteroid and a member of the stony Phocaea family. It orbits the Sun in the inner main-belt at a distance of 1.8–3.1 AU once every 3 years and 9 months (1,377 days; semi-major axis of 2.42 AU). Its orbit has an eccentricity of 0.26 and an inclination of 23° with respect to the ecliptic.

The asteroid was first identified as 1977 SX_{2} at Crimea–Nauchnij in September 1977. The body's observation arc begins with a precovery taken at Palomar Observatory in October 1977, or two and a half years prior to its official discovery observation at Bickley.

== Physical characteristics ==
DeLaeter is an assumed S-type asteroid, which contradicts the low albedo measured by the space-based surveys (see below).

=== Rotation period ===
Photometric observations made by American astronomer Robert Stephens in June 2003 at the Santana Observatory (646) in Rancho Cucamonga, California, gave a synodic rotation period of 13.83 hours and a brightness variation of 0.33 magnitude (U=2). In May 2014, a lightcurve obtained by Brian Warner at the Palmer Divide Station (U82) gave a divergent period of 5.633 hours with an amplitude of 0.13 (U=2).

=== Diameter and albedo ===
According to the surveys carried out by the Japanese Akari satellite and the NEOWISE mission of NASA's Wide-field Infrared Survey Explorer, DeLaeter measures between 10.97 and 12.935 kilometers in diameter and its surface has an albedo between 0.0573 and 0.08.

The Collaborative Asteroid Lightcurve Link adopts an albedo of 0.0573 and calculates a diameter of 13.95 kilometers based on an absolute magnitude of 13.0.

== Naming ==
This minor planet was named after Australian scientist John Robert de Laeter (1933–2010), who was a professor at Curtin University in Western Australia. His research included pioneering application of mass spectrometry and problems in the field of nuclear physics, cosmochemistry, geochronology, isotope geochemistry. He was also a supporter of the Perth Observatory where this asteroid was discovered.

The official naming citation was published by the Minor Planet Center on 28 August 1996 (M.P.C. 27733).
