= John Robert de Laeter =

Australian scientist (1933–2010)

- Born: 3 May 1933; South Perth, Western Australia
- Died: 16 August 2010 (aged 77); Perth, Western Australia
- Citizenship: Australian
- Education: University of Western Australia
- Known for: determination of atomic weights geochronology of western Australian geology
- Awards: ANZAAS Medal (1992)
- Scientific career
- Fields: Nuclear physics, Cosmochemistry, Geochronology, Isotope geochemistry
- Workplaces: Curtin University of Technology
- Doctoral advisor: Peter M. Jeffery

John Robert de Laeter, AO, FTSE, FAIP (3 May 1933 – 16 August 2010) was an Australian scientist with a distinguished career across several fields in nuclear physics, cosmochemistry, geochronology and isotope geochemistry. He was also a prominent administrator and promoter who oversaw the establishment of several scientific research and education centres in Western Australia.

== Early life and education ==
John Robert de Laeter was born on 3 May 1933 in South Perth, Western Australia. He attended South Perth Primary School on Forrest Street and won a scholarship to attend the prestigious secondary school Perth Modern School in Subiaco. At the University of Western Australia he achieved first class honours in physics and education to start a career as a science teacher.

== Scientific career ==
De Laeter began teaching in 1957 at the Perth Technical College. While teaching at Bunbury High School in the late 1950s, de Laeter attended a science teachers' conference in Sydney; he later described his experience there:

I heard two of the world's experts battling it out on how the universe began – the Big Bang Theory versus Steady State Cosmology. It inspired me and I decided there and then to go back to university and do a PhD in physics and get involved in these astrophysical questions.

Further university studies culminated in a thesis on the isotopic composition of terrestrial and meteoritic tin and a PhD in 1966. After researching nuclear physics at McMaster University in Canada on a National Research Council of Canada Fellowship, de Laeter returned to Australia in 1968 as inaugural head of the Department of Physics at the West Australian Institute of Technology (now Curtin University).

De Laeter's scientific interests were broad, but centred on the application of mass spectrometry techniques in cosmochemistry and nuclear physics. He is credited with refining the isotopic composition and atomic weight measurements of elements, including antimony, barium, tin and ytterbium. This work also led to mass spectrometric investigations of the Oklo natural nuclear reactor to better understand the diffusion and retentivity of various fission products in the context of managing man-made nuclear waste. From 1980, de Laeter was selected by the International Union of Pure and Applied Chemistry to serve on the Commission on Isotopic Abundances and Atomic Weights (CIAAW), serving as the Secretary of the commission from 1984 to 1987 and as its Chairman from 1988 to 1991. In 1984, he authored the CIAAW Technical Guidelines manual, which still serves as a reference for adopting new atomic weight values by the CIAAW.

Recognising the application of mass spectrometry methods to geology in the 1970s and 1980s, de Laeter also established a series of projects with the Geological Survey of Western Australia and the University of Western Australia to develop geochronology capabilities based on the rubidium–strontium decay, samarium–neodymium decay and uranium–lead decay schemes. These projects produced a series of publications that established the geochronological framework of western Australian geology, for example in the Pilbara craton; and establishing the extreme age of the Narryer gneiss terrane of the Yilgarn craton.

== Research and education leadership ==
As the West Australian Institute of Technology evolved into Curtin University of Technology, de Laeter became Deputy Vice-Chancellor, Research and Development and provided important administrative service and guidance to several major projects including the establishment of Technology Park Bentley and establishing a sensitive high-resolution ion microprobe (SHRIMP) laboratory in 1994 that became the core of the John de Laeter Centre for Isotope Research. His strong interest in the SHRIMP instrument (developed by a doctoral colleague, Bill Compston, at the Australian National University in Canberra) is credited for the commercial development of this technology.

The early interest in science education continued with significant leadership of projects establishing the Science and Mathematics Education Centre at Curtin University, the Scitech Discovery Centre in Perth and the Gravity Discovery Centre at Gingin. He also contributed to the literature on science education.

De Laeter retired in 1995. A symposium to mark his retirement was notable for one of the last public speeches by Mark Oliphant. This was noted as a very fitting tribute, because Oliphant had given a lecture in 1950 that had inspired Peter M. Jeffrey – de Laeter's PhD supervisor – to begin the pioneering work in mass spectrometry and geochronology in Australia.

== Awards and honors ==
In 1992 de Laeter was made an Officer of the Order of Australia for services to science education. He received a Centenary Medal in 2001, for services to Australian society in environmental science and technology.

He also had a minor planet, 3893 DeLaeter, named after him in recognition for his support of the Perth Observatory.
