= Blair Bowden =

Royal Australian Navy officer

- Born: 7 June 1916; Dunedin, New Zealand
- Died: 30 September 1981 (aged 65); London, England
- Military career
- Allegiance: Australia
- Branch: Women's Royal Australian Naval Service
- Service years: 1943–1946; 1950–1955
- Rank: Chief Officer
- Commands: Women's Royal Australian Naval Service (1950–54)
- Conflicts: Second World War
- Awards: British Empire Medal

Blair Thisbe Bowden, BEM (née Williams; 7 June 1916 – 30 September 1981) was an Australian naval officer who served as director of the Women's Royal Australian Naval Service (WRANS).

Born in Dunedin, New Zealand, Bowden attended Christchurch Girls High School and received an arts degree from Canterbury University College before moving to Australia and enlisting in 1943. She was a member of the first training course for potential female officers, receiving the rank of third officer. By the end of the Second World War she had been promoted to first officer and was "senior serving WRANS officer in the New South Wales command". The WRANS was disbanded in the immediate post-war period, but on its reformation in 1950 Bowden was appointed as its director, a position she held until 1954. She then moved to London and worked at the Australian High Commission, receiving the British Empire Medal in 1970.

Military offices
| Recreated Title last held by Chief Officer Sheila McClemans in 1947 | Director of the Women's Royal Australian Naval Service; 1950–1954 | Succeeded by First Officer Joan Cole |
