= Joan Streeter =

- Born: 25 April 1918; Melbourne, Victoria
- Died: 14 April 1993 (aged 74); Canberra, Australian Capital Territory
- Military career
- Allegiance: Australia
- Branch: Women's Royal Australian Naval Service
- Service years: 1943–1946; 1954–1973
- Rank: Captain
- Commands: Women's Royal Australian Naval Service (1958–73)
- Conflicts: Second World War
- Awards: Officer of the Order of the British Empire

Joan Streeter, OBE (née Ritchie; 25 April 1918 – 14 April 1993) was an Australian naval officer.

Born in Melbourne, Streeter attended a business college and worked as a clerk before joining the Women's Royal Australian Naval Service (WRANS) in 1943. She was trained as an officer and served at the bases Penguin, Kuranda, Kuttabul and Rushcutter before the discontinuation of the service after the end of the Second World War. The service was reformed at the onset of the Korean War; Streeter, who had in the interim moved first to London and then to Canada, returned and was in 1958 named director of the WRANS. She served in this role until her retirement in 1973 and "was influential in developing government policy to encourage women to enter naval careers". Significantly, in 1968 she spearheaded a reform to allow women to remain in WRANS after they were married.

Streeter was appointed an Officer of the Order of the British Empire in 1964.

Military offices
Preceded by First Officer Elizabeth Hill	Director of the Women's Royal Australian Naval Service; 1958–1973	Succeeded by Captain Barbara MacLeod
