= Scitech =

Science museum in Perth, Western Australia

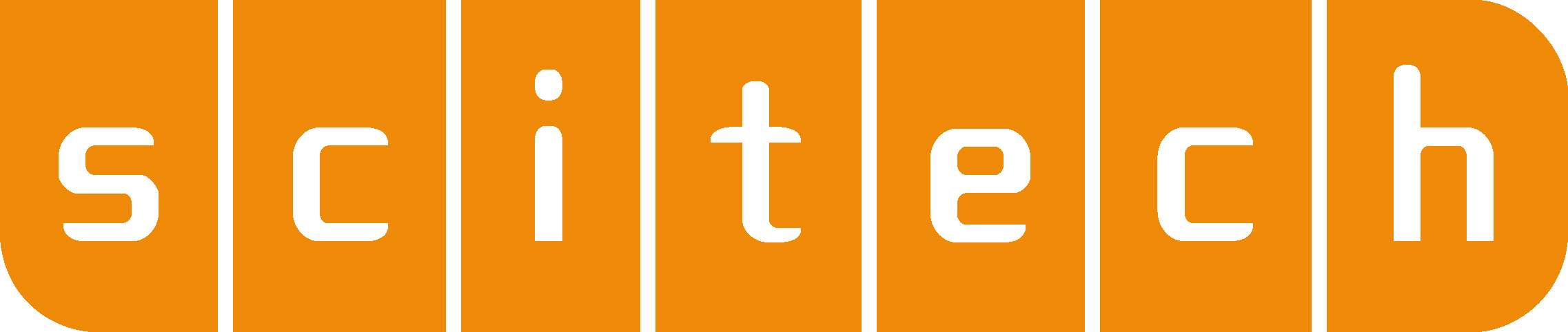

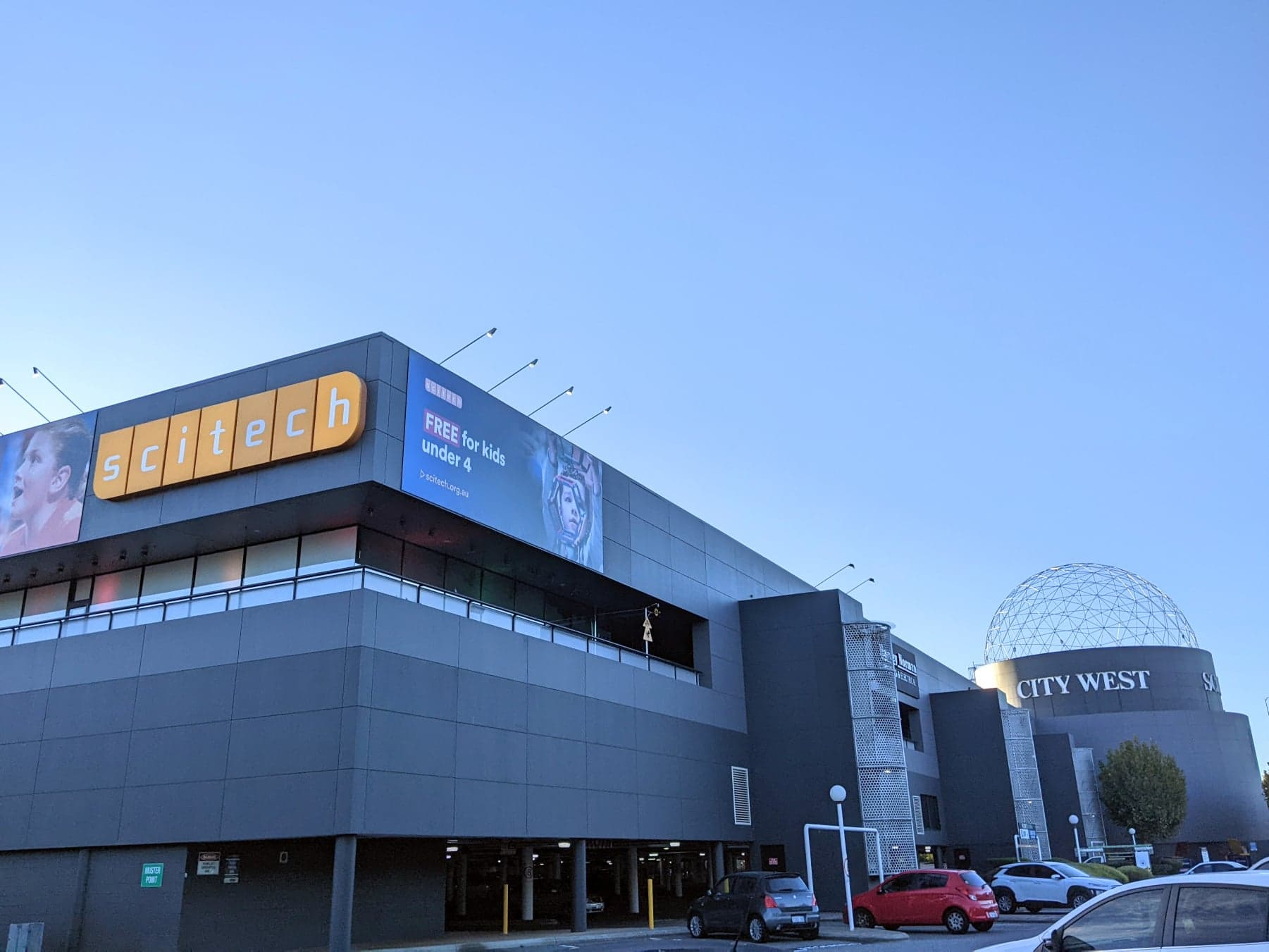
- Exterior of Scitech Discovery Centre
- Established: 13 August 1988; 38 years ago
- Location: 20 Sutherland Street, West Perth, Western Australia
- Coordinates: 31°56′39″S 115°50′49″E
- Type: Science museum
- Public transit access: City West
- Website: www.scitech.org.au

Scitech is a not-for-profit company encompassing the Scitech Discovery Centre, an interactive science centre in West Perth, Western Australia, outreach programs, professional learning programs and digital content.

The organisation's purpose is to inspire engagement by all Western Australians in science, technology, engineering and mathematics.

== History ==
In the 1980s, three influential Western Australian figures – physicist John Robert de Laeter, mining leader Laurence Brodie-Hall, and politician and computing pioneer Mal Bryce – asked the question: "If our future depends on science and technology, how can we get people inspired?" In response, Scitech opened its doors on 13 August 1988 with a mission to inspire Western Australia's collective curiosity. It took nine months for the original workshop team to build around 150 exhibits to be ready for the opening of the Discovery Centre.

== Scitech Discovery Centre ==
The Scitech Discovery Centre features interactive exhibits designed and built in the onsite workshop to engage visitors with science, technology, engineering and maths (STEM). It also offers live science, puppet and planetarium shows presented by Scitech Science Communicators, and a Scitech Lab used to facilitate workshops for school excursions and school holiday workshops.

Feature exhibitions are rotated every year following a particular theme, storyline or concept, which are built in-house by Scitech's design, graphics, and workshop departments. These feature exhibitions are also designed to travel and have toured to science centres nationally across Australia and internationally including North America, Saudi Arabia and China.

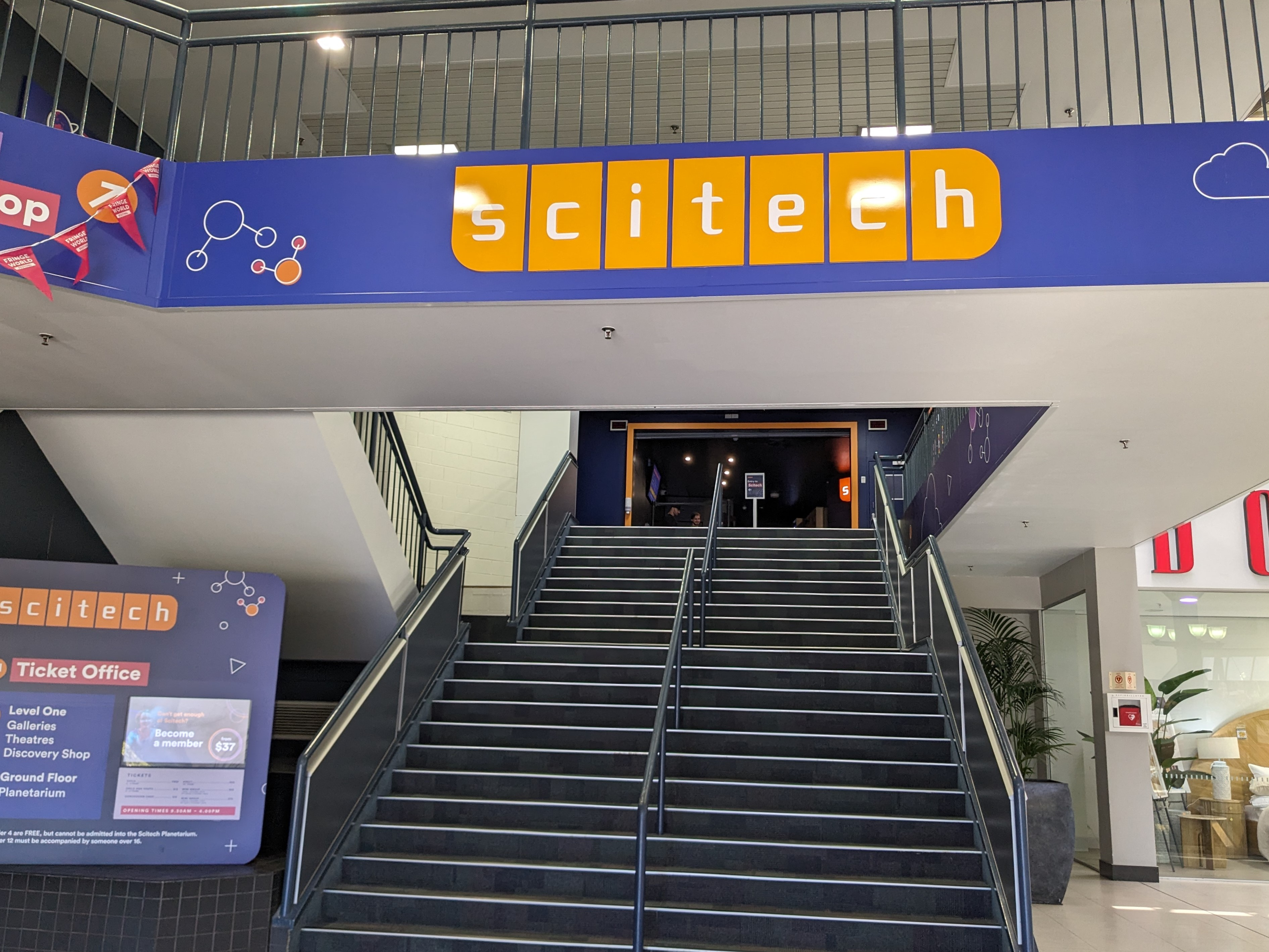

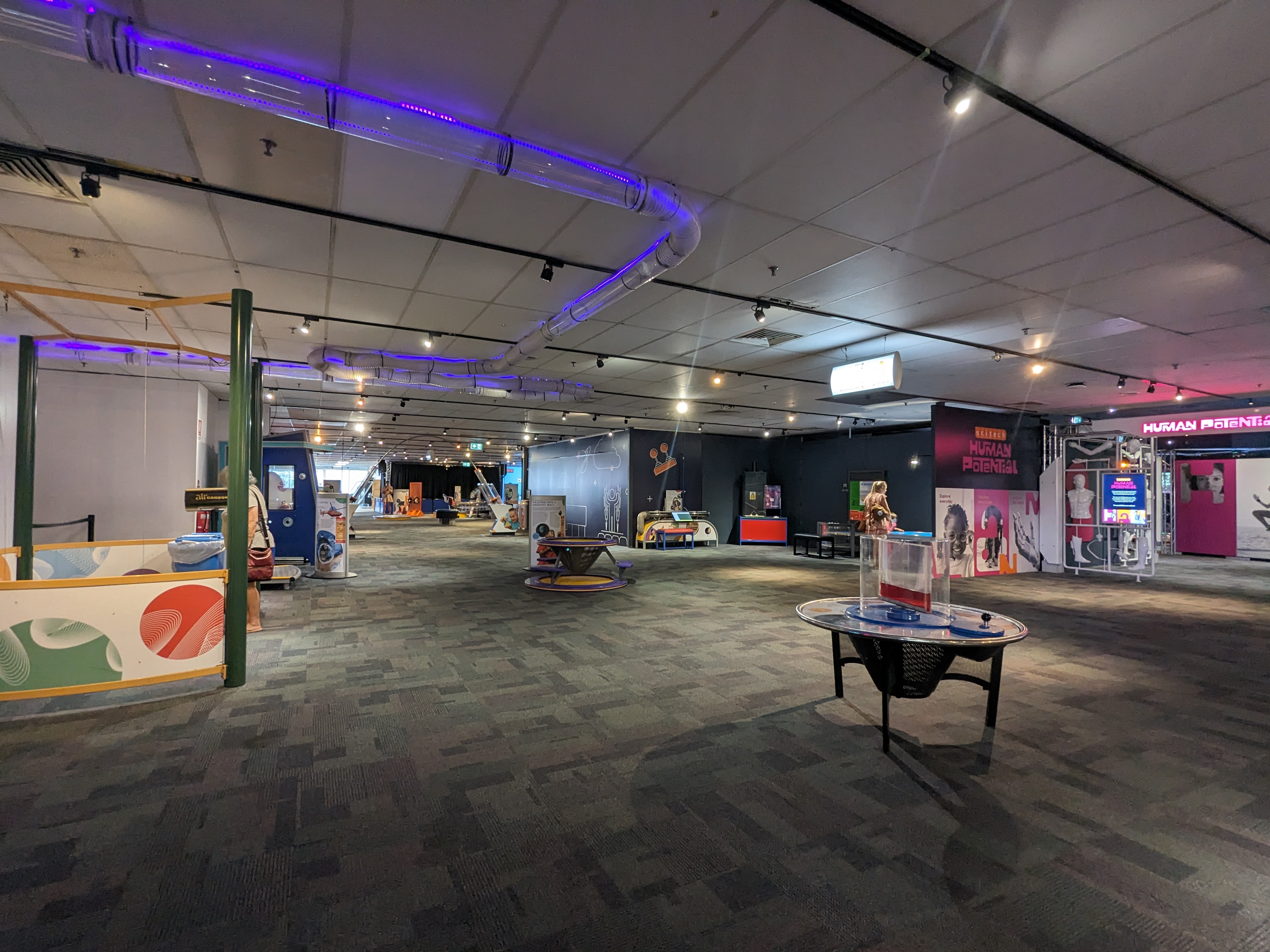

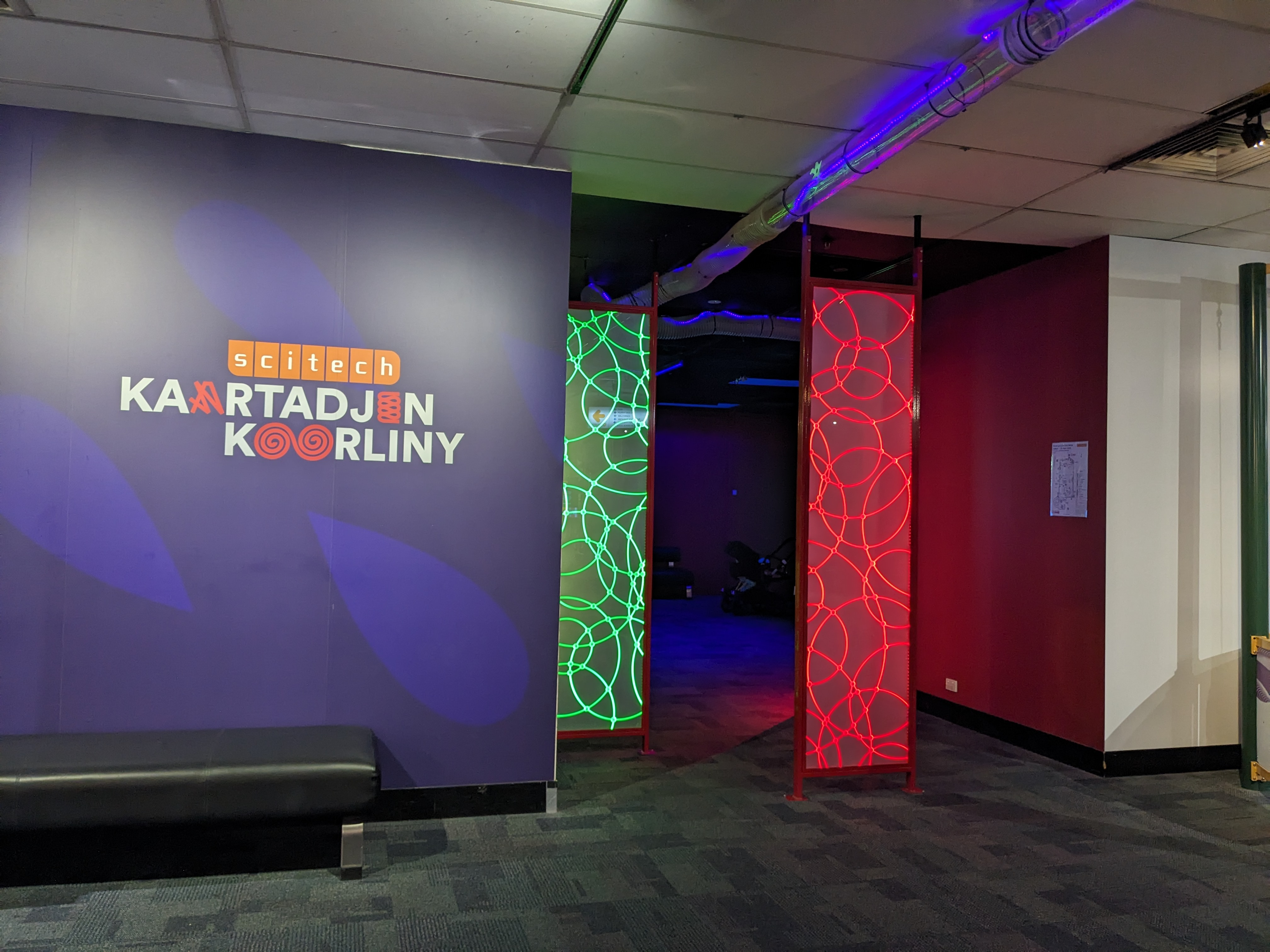

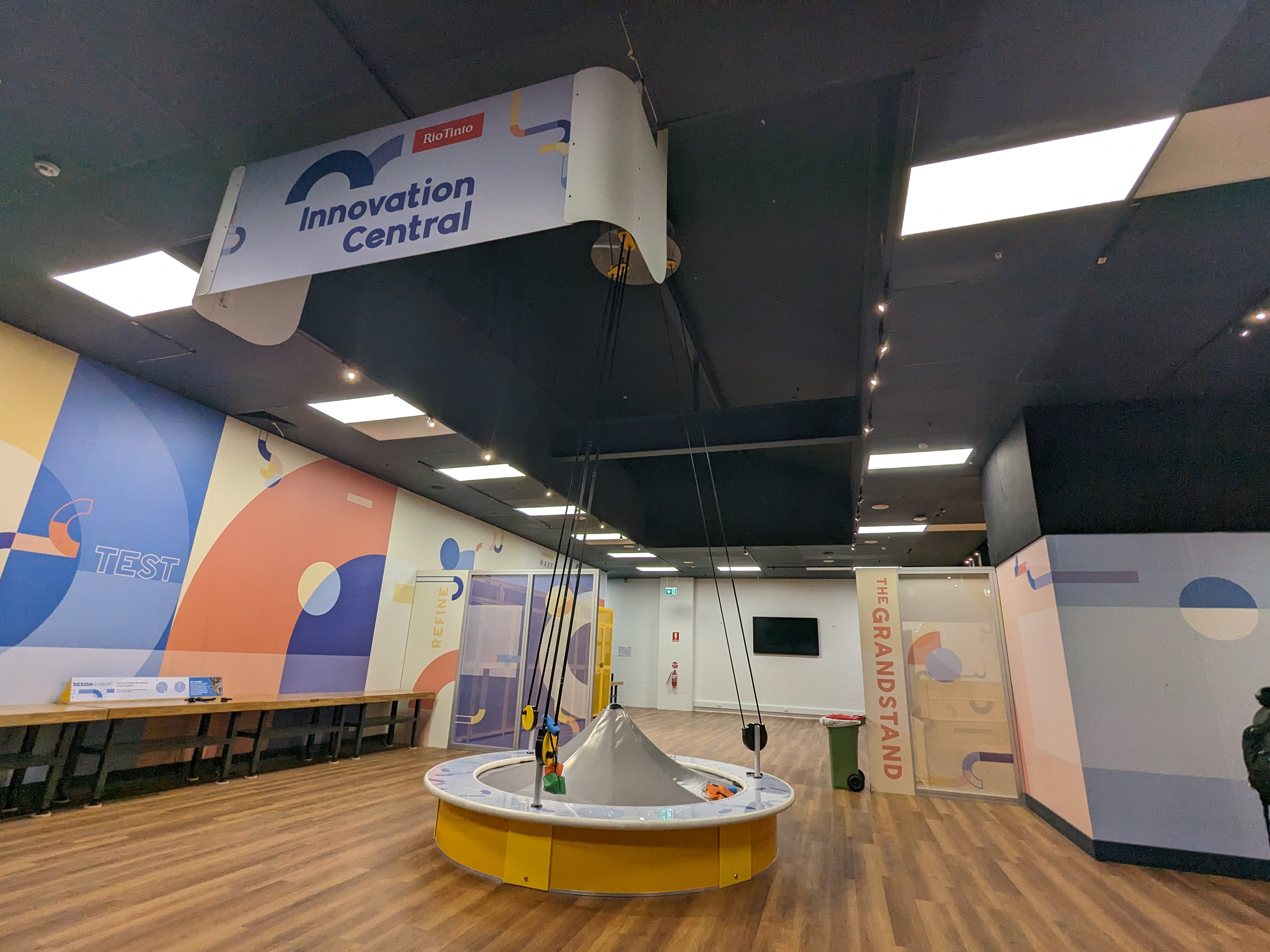

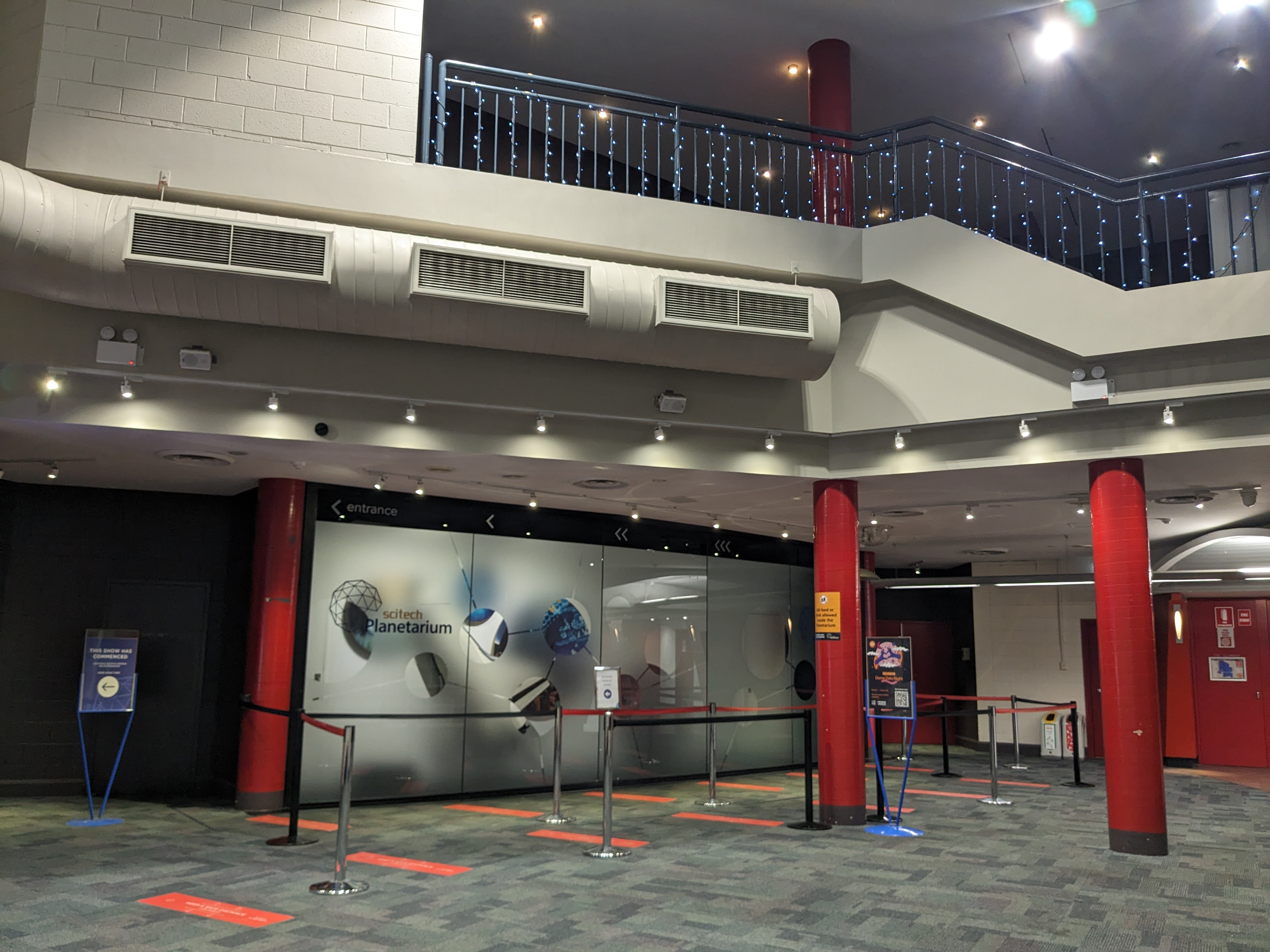

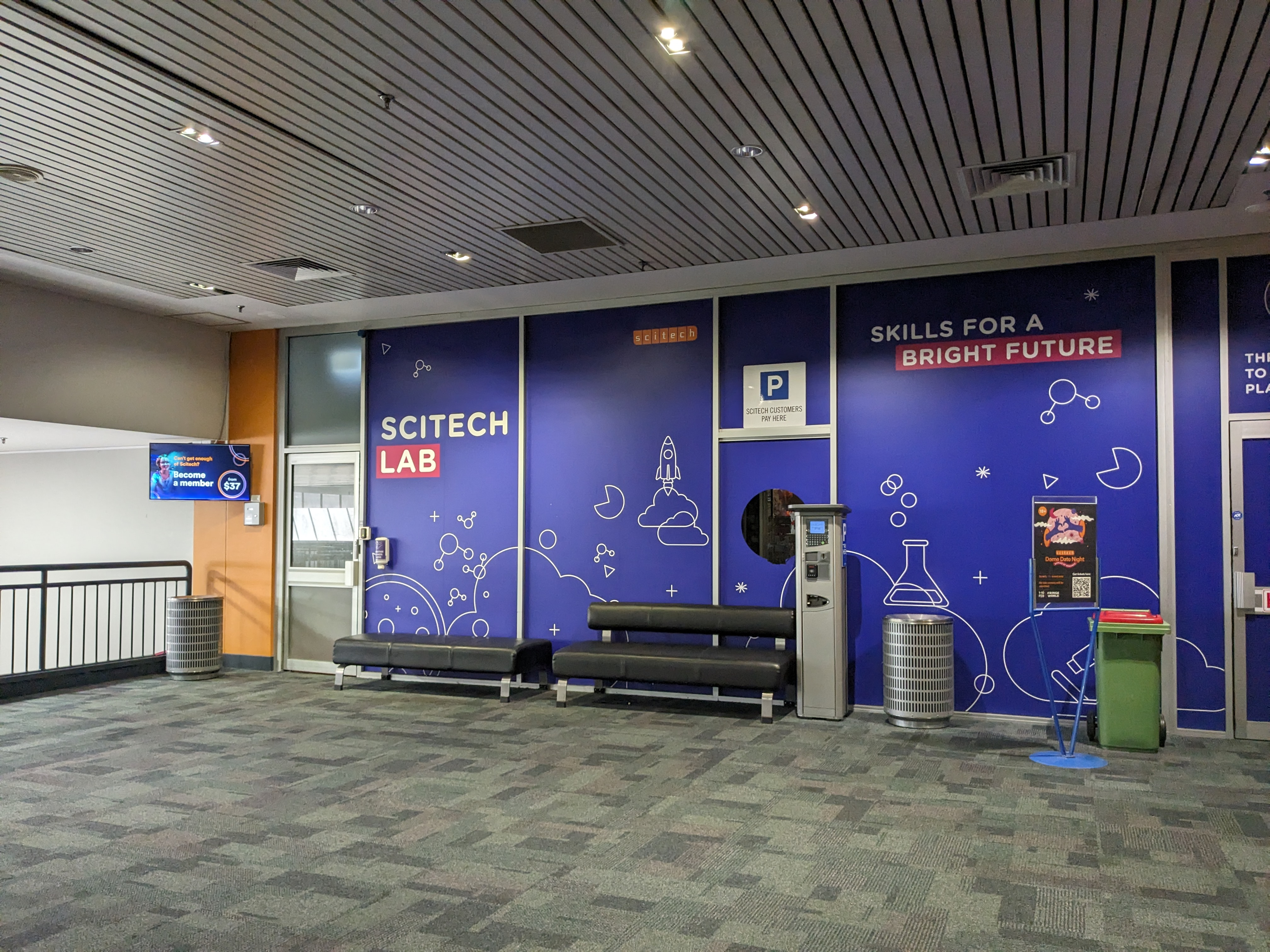

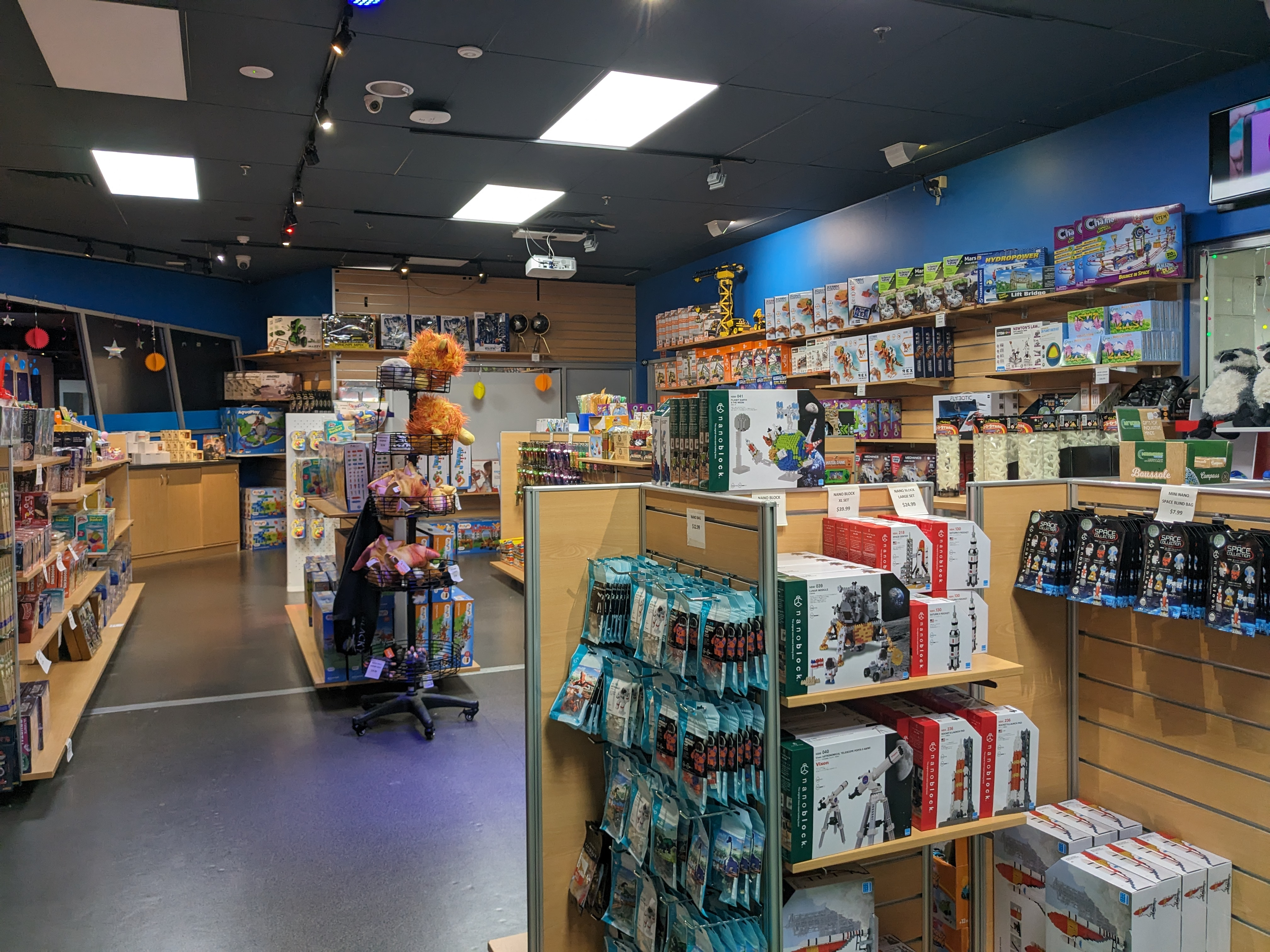

== Scitech Planetarium ==
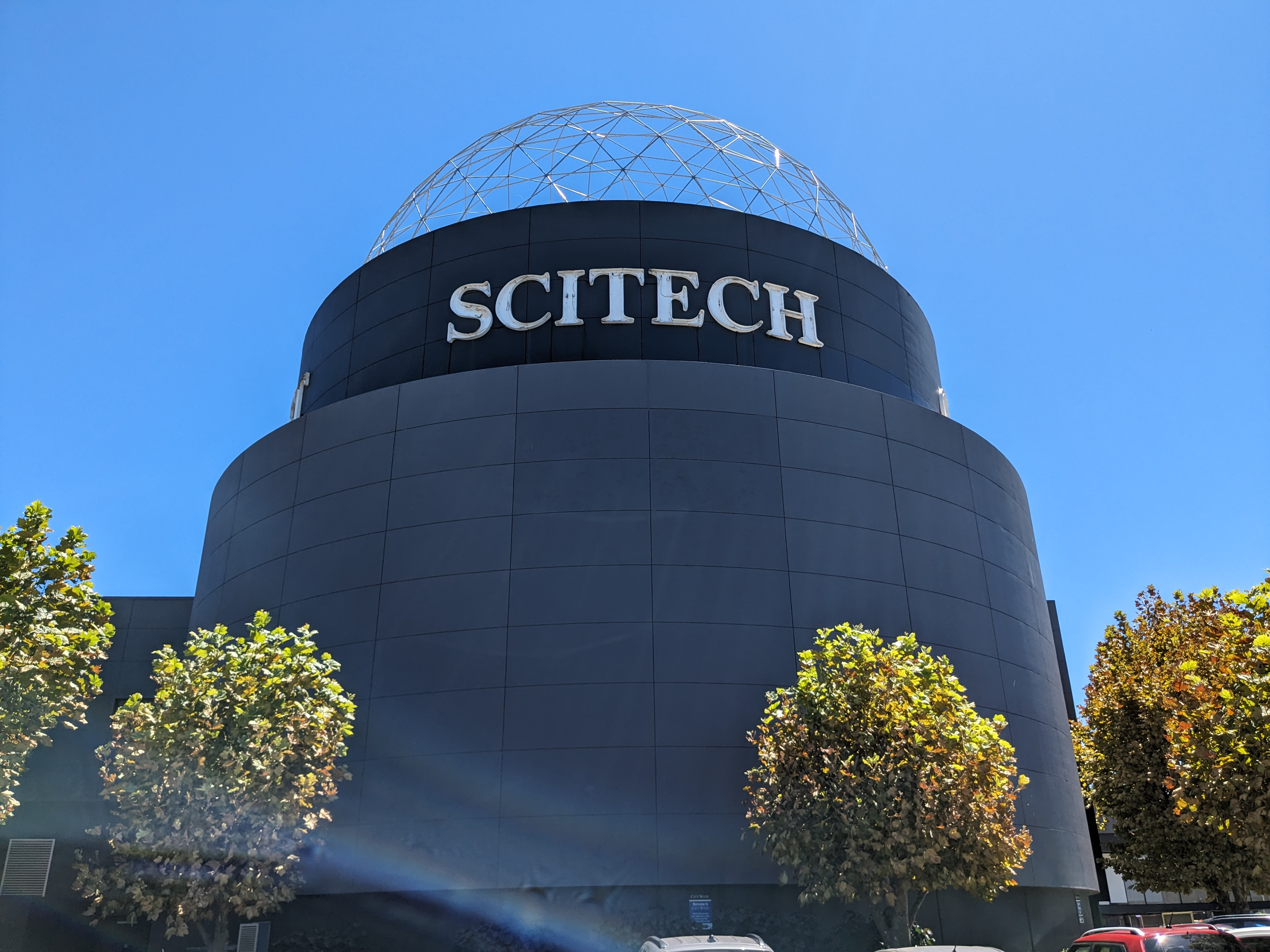
Outside Scitech Planetarium

In 2004, Scitech leased the empty Omni Max Theatre and rebranded it as "Horizon – The Planetarium".

A refit was done by Sky-Skan to install 6 Barco 909 projectors for high quality astronomy, full-dome shows and also for the live element of each presentation.

The Scitech Planetarium has a diameter of 18m and is one of the largest in the Southern Hemisphere. It has two Sony TX–T420 projectors using ultra-wide angle lenses custom made for Scitech. These projectors fill the full 180 degrees of the night sky in 4K 60fps detail. The Scitech Planetarium uses an azimuth speaker channel for ceiling effects and has an 8.1 surround sound system.

During a Planetarium show, the presenter is based at the front of the planetarium and has full control over real-time astronomy visualisations. Visitors experience immersive and informative full dome shows about the stars, planets and universe, as well as premade films on astronomy and other topics.

== Scitech Statewide ==
Originally launched is 1996 as Roadshow, Scitech's Statewide team provides Scitech's outreach programs including educational early childhood and primary school incursions and event activations to schools and communities across Western Australia. The team visits every regional and remote community in Western Australia every three years.

== Scitech Professional Learning ==
Scitech’s Learning Futures team facilitate professional learning programs for teachers in maths and digital technologies, providing opportunities for teachers to further their skills and knowledge in science, technology, engineering and mathematics (STEM) teaching. Current programs include Lighthouse Maths, Alcoa Real World Digital Technologies and Alcoa Champions of Digital Technologies, as well as DIY Kits which can be hired out by schools, providing resources and activities in STEM subjects.

== Scitech Digital Content ==
Scitech's digital content provides audiences access to STEM engagement regardless of their location. These include Science at Home activities, podcasts and a YouTube channel Toy Tear Down which sees a Scitech Science Communicator take apart a toy and discover the science behind how it works.

=== Particle ===
Particle is Scitech’s independent media hub that connects young adults to science stories from Western Australia and beyond. This includes news stories, articles and podcast series Elements which uses a narrative journalism approach to explore one of the four classical elements, water, fire, earth and air.

== Memberships ==
Scitech is a member of these associations of science centres:

- Asia Pacific Network of Science and Technology Centres
- Association of Science-Technology Centers
- The European Collaborative for Science, Industry and Technology
- The Network of Australasian Museum Exhibitors

== See also ==
- List of science museums
