= Australian Bank =

Australian retail bank (1981–1989)

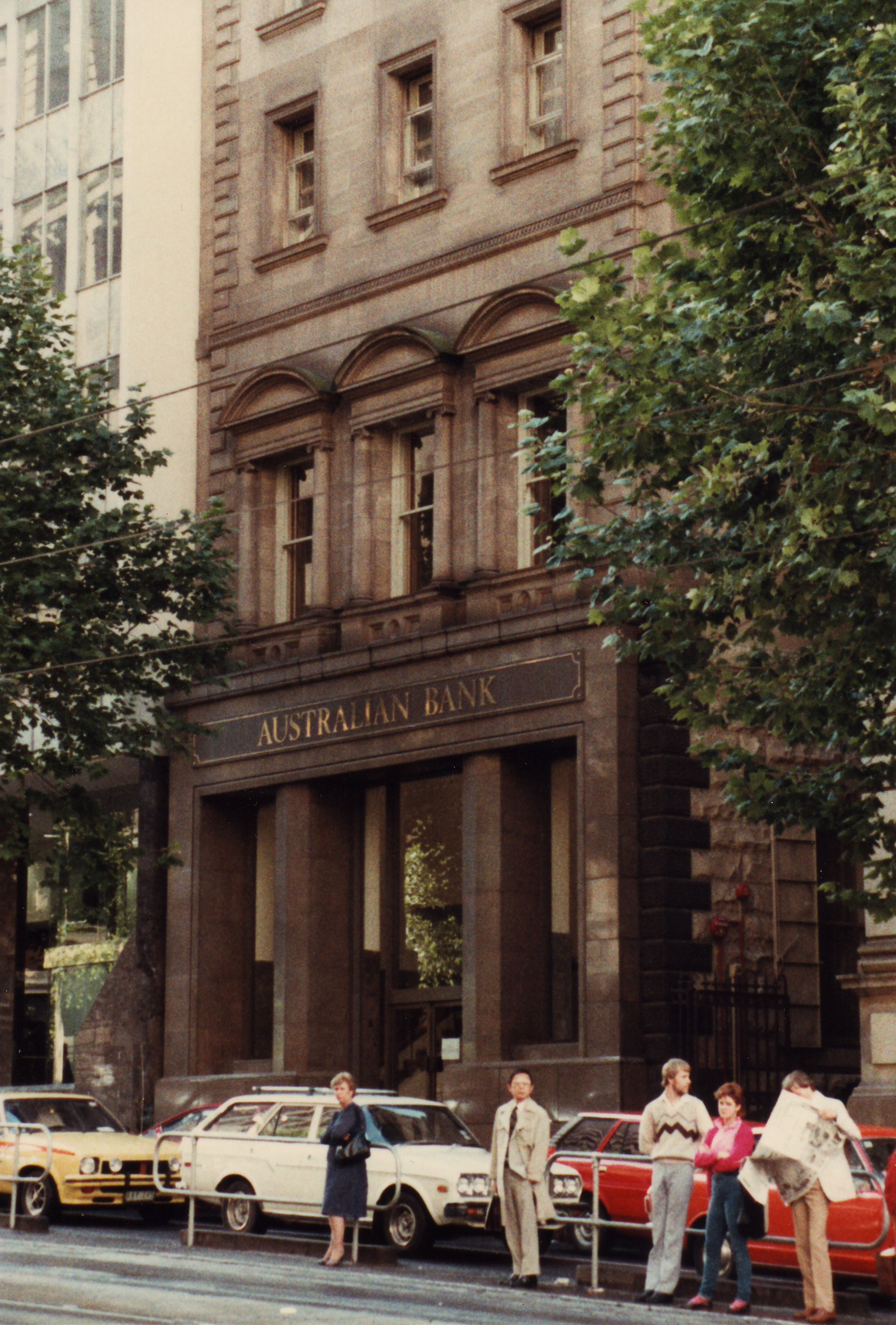
The original Melbourne office of Australian Bank at 400 Collins Street in 1985, shortly before relocation (across the street) to 395 Collins Street.

Australian Bank (ABL) was an Australian retail bank that operated between 1981 and 1989. It was established by Perth businessman Garrick Agnew (its first chairman) and Sydney-based Mark Johnson (its first CEO). Johnson was also a co-founder of Macquarie Group.

== History ==
At the time of its establishment in 1981, it was the first new trading bank in Australia since 1945.

In the late 1970s, Agnew had expressed concerns that Australian banks were not sufficiently competitive. During a discussion with fellow Western Australian John Stone (then Secretary to the Treasury), Stone suggested (possibly in jest) that, if Agnew were so concerned, he should establish a bank of his own.

The bank opened offices in Perth (190 St George's Terrace), Sydney (17 O’Connell Street) and Melbourne (400 Collins Street, moving to 395 Collins Street from mid 1985).

Whilst initially successful, the bank soon struggled in the wake of the turmoil in the Australian banking environment during the mid to late 1980s, particularly with bad debts arising from overseas loan funding following the floating of the Australian Dollar in December 1983.

The bank downsized through a series of staff redundancies commencing in early 1986, and finally wound up in February 1989 following its purchase by State Bank of Victoria.

== See also ==
- Banking in Australia
