= Ruby Boye =

Australian coastwatcher (1891–1990)

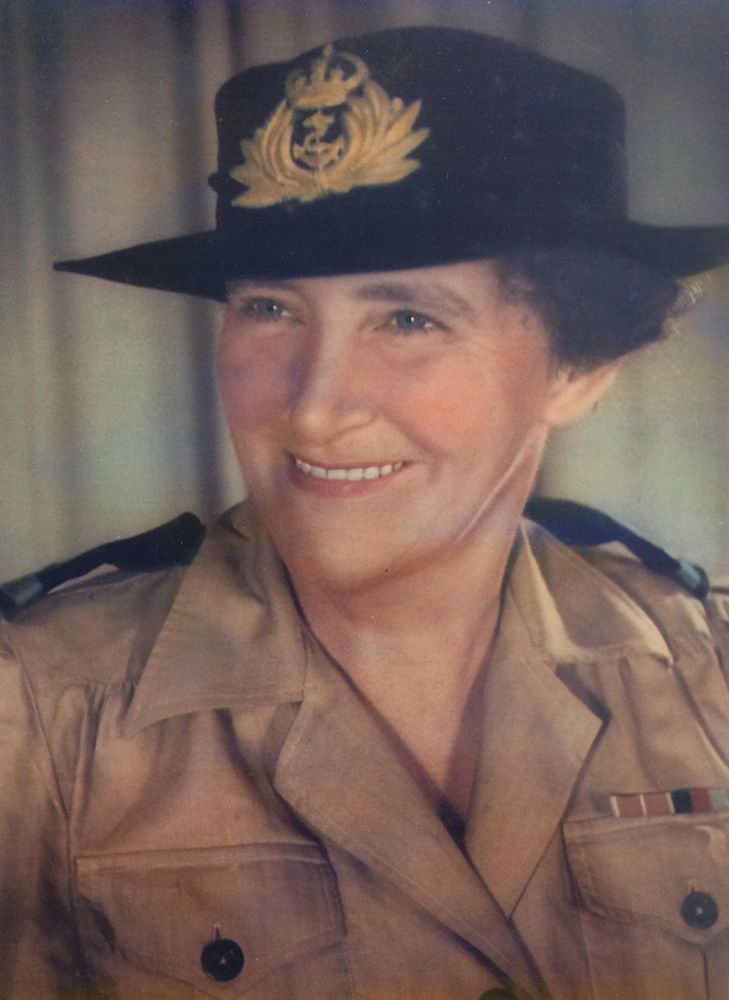
- Born: 29 July 1891; St Peters, New South Wales
- Died: 14 September 1990 (aged 99); Narwee, New South Wales
- Military career
- Allegiance: Australia
- Branch: Women's Royal Australian Naval Service
- Service years: 1943–1946
- Rank: Third Officer
- Conflicts: Second World War: Battle of the Coral Sea; Guadalcanal campaign; Solomon Islands campaign
- Awards: British Empire Medal

Ruby Boye, BEM (29 July 1891 – 14 September 1990) was an Australian coastwatcher on the island of Vanikoro in the South Pacific Area during the Second World War. She was Australia's only female coastwatcher.

== Early life ==
Ruby Olive Jones was born in the Sydney suburb of St Peters on 29 July 1891, the fifth of eight children of Alfred Jones, a storeman, and his wife Emily née Wild. On 25 October 1919, she married Sydney Skov Boye, a laundry proprietor, at St Stephen's Anglican Church in Newtown. They had two sons, Ken and Don.

Skov had previously worked on Tulagi in the Solomon Islands, where he had worked for Lever Brothers. In 1928, he returned to his previous job, and the family moved to Tulagi. They resided there until 1936, although the boys were educated in Sydney. In 1936, Skov became the Island Manager for the Kauri Timber Company's logging operations on Vanikoro, one of the Santa Cruz Islands. The island was remote and mountainous, and surrounded by a coral reef. The reef is treacherous, and has claimed many ships, including that of the French explorer La Perouse in 1788, and was therefore avoided by passing vessels.

The island had no roads; logs were dragged down to the harbour by tractors and floated to await collection by a ship. These arrived from Melbourne four times a year, bringing the mail and supplies. The island workforce included about 20 Australians and New Zealanders, including a doctor, radio operator, storemen, stevedores, and woodcutters, and about 80 local labourers. Skov and Ruby enjoyed three months' leave every two years.

== Second World War ==
Before the outbreak of the Second World War, Commander Eric Feldt organised the Coastwatcher service, and Vanikoro became part of it. However, the radio operator indicated a desire to join the RAAF. Before departing, he trained Ruby to be a radio operator. Her main role was to provide daily weather reports. These were done by voice; she would later teach herself how to use Morse code. The position was supposed to be temporary, but no replacement ever arrived. Following the outbreak of the Pacific War, the company decided to evacuate its employees from the island. Ken and Don were sent to live with relatives in Australia, but Skov elected to stay to mind the company's property, and Ruby to operate the radio. With the departure of the company doctor, she also assumed responsibility for caring for the health of the local population.

Initially, Ruby's reports were sent to Tulagi, but it was occupied by the Japanese in May 1942, and henceforth reports were sent to Port Vila in the New Hebrides, and only in Morse, using the Playfair cipher. Vanikoro became completely isolated. At one point they went without supplies for ten months, subsisting on locally grown and raised fish, chickens, sweet potatoes and bananas. The radio was for military use only, and Ruby received only three personal messages during war, advising her of the deaths of her father, mother, and sister. Her activities became known to the Japanese, who at one point broadcast a message to her in English: "Calling Mrs Boye, Japanese commander say you get out!"

Vanikoro was completely defenceless, protected only by its formidable coral reef. Japanese boats attempted to discover the channel into the harbour without success. It was bombed once, and leaflets were dropped. Skov and Ruby decided to move the radio station away from their home at Paeu, the main village on the south-west coast, and into the mountains. The plan was to escape into the jungle if the Japanese invaded. In the event, Vanikoro was never occupied by the Japanese. Unfortunately, the suspension bridge over the Lawrence River subsequently collapsed, forcing Ruby to make the trip over its crocodile-infested water in a punt four times a day.

Ruby provided vital information during the Battle of the Coral Sea in May 1942 and the Battle of the Santa Cruz Islands in October 1942. After the Japanese executed an elderly planter as a spy in March 1942, the Coastwatchers were commissioned as officers in the RAAF or Royal Australian Navy to provide some legal protection under the Geneva Conventions, although it was far from certain that the Japanese would honour it; but it was not until 27 July 1943 that Ruby was officially appointed an honorary third officer in the Women's Royal Australian Naval Service (WRANS). Her uniform was later dropped to her by parachute.

Admiral William Halsey, Jr, paid her a visit, arriving on the island in a PBY Catalina flying boat to personally thank her for her services. When she became ill with shingles in late 1943, he arranged for a PBY to fly her to Australia for hospital treatment, and for four US Navy sailors to man the radio station until she returned. After three weeks she resumed her duty. The station remained operational until she received the news over her radio in August 1945 that the war had ended, but she continued sending weather messages for the Bureau of Meteorology. Her appointment in the WRANS was terminated on 30 September 1946.

For her wartime services, Ruby was awarded the British Empire Medal in 1944, which was presented to her in a ceremony in Suva in 1946. She also received the 1939–1945 Star, the Pacific Star, the Australia Service Medal 1939–1945 and the War Medal 1939–1945; but no pay, as her rank was, unlike that of her male counterparts, considered honorary. She was Australia's only female coastwatcher.

== Later life ==
The timber industry resumed after the war ended, but in 1947 Skov became seriously ill with leukemia, and they returned to Sydney in August 1947. He died two weeks later. She married Frank Bengough Jones, a departmental manager, at St John's Anglican Church in Penshurst on 19 June 1950, but he died in 1961. In later life, now known as Ruby Boye-Jones, she suffered from diabetes, and had her left leg amputated below the knee. On the occasion of her 98th birthday in 1989, the Chief of Naval Staff, Vice Admiral Michael Hudson, wrote to her: "Your name is synonymous with the finest traditions of service to the Navy and the nation. We have not, nor will not, forget your wonderful contribution."

Ruby died in Narwee, New South Wales, on 14 September 1990. Her remains were cremated. An accommodation block at the Australian Defence Force Academy in Canberra was named after her, and the Ex-WRANS Association dedicated a page to her in the Garden Island Chapel Remembrance Book.
