= Joseph Parsons (educator) =

Joseph Parsons (1876–1951) was a long-serving principal of Perth Modern School and an influential West Australian educator.

Parsons was principal for 27 years, from 1912 to 1939.

He was born in Moscow and emigrated to Australia from England in 1886. By 1901 he was a headmaster in the WA Goldfields town of Boulder, and impressed Cecil Andrews, and in 1905 was made head of Perth Boys School.

Parsons died in 1951 and was buried at Karrakatta Cemetery. A library and a House at Perth Modern is named for him.
