= Walter D. Scott =

Australian accountant

Sir Walter Scott
- Born: 10 November 1903; Perth, Australia
- Died: 12 February 1981 (aged 77)
- Occupation: Accountant
- Spouse: Dorothy Scott

Sir Walter Scott, AC, CMG (10 November 1903 - 12 February 1981) was an Australian accountant who founded Australia's first management consultancy firm, WD Scott and was active in its leadership until his death in 1981. He was knighted in 1966 and appointed a Companion of the Order of Australia in 1979.

In the 1950s, 1960s, and 1970s, WD Scott was Australia's leading management consultancy firm. Born in Perth and trained as an accountant, he is best known for leading the review into decimal currency and heading the Australian Decimal Currency Board.

WD Scott was named after Scott and his wife, Dorothy (later Lady Scott).

The Australian Graduate School of Management at the University of NSW has a leadership scholarship named after Sir Walter Scott.

WD Scott was recipient of the first Juran Medal, awarded by the Australian Organization for Quality. It was presented on 4 September 1975 by Joseph M. Juran himself, stating: "Probably few Australians of contemporary times have given so much diversified service to their country as Sir Walter Scott. He is very much a product and a champion of private enterprise; yet governments of differing political shades have charged him with missions of national responsibility. Internationally Sir Walter has been active and has been awarded many overseas honours. He has held a number of important overseas posts including President of the Federated Chambers of Commerce (1968-70), President of the International Committee of Scientific Management (1958-60) and since 1969 has been Chancellor of the International Academy of Management. In Australia Sir Walter’s public service began in World War II notably as Chairman of the NSW Munitions Board. Since then he has been a member of the Secondary Industries Commission; Chairman of the Motor Car Advisory Committee, member of the Aluminium Production Commission, Chairman of the NSW Coal Prices Committee, Chairman of the Industrial Design Council of Australia, Chairman of the Decimal Currency Board and in very recent times Chairman of the Committee examining national Purchasing. It is in the field of quality control that Sir Walter made his mark not only with AOQC but throughout many areas in which he exercised influence. Long ago he recognised the vital role of quality control throughout our industry and the continuing challenge to improve quality of life – in services, in products, methods, use of time and use of leisure."
