= Sheila McClemans =

(1909–1988) barrister and naval officer

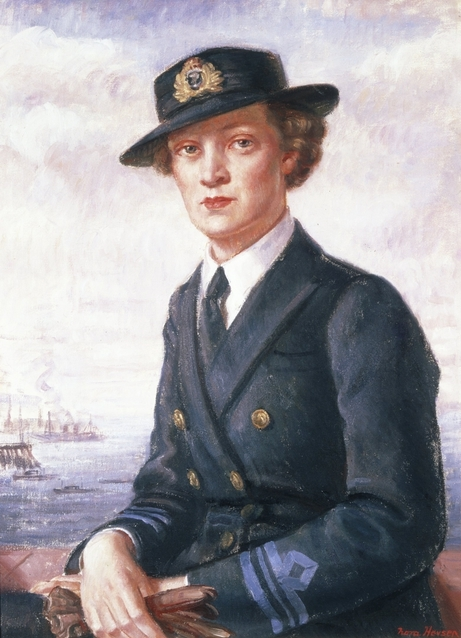
- A 1943 painting of Sheila McClemans by Nora Heysen
- Born: 3 May 1909; Claremont, Western Australia
- Died: 10 June 1988 (aged 79); Dalkeith, Western Australia
- Military career
- Allegiance: Australia
- Branch: Women's Royal Australian Naval Service
- Service years: 1943–1947
- Rank: Chief Officer
- Commands: Women's Royal Australian Naval Service (1944–47)
- Conflicts: Second World War
- Awards: Companion of the Order of St Michael and St George; Officer of the Order of the British Empire
- Other work: Lawyer, barrister and company director

Sheila Mary McClemans, CMG, OBE (3 May 1909 – 10 June 1988) was an Australian servicewoman, lawyer, barrister and company director. She set up the first all female law firm in Western Australia and was the first female barrister to appear before the Supreme Court of Western Australia.

== Early life ==
Sheila McClemans was born to Ada Lucy Walker and William Joseph McClemans in Claremont, Western Australia on 3 May 1909. She attended the Perth Modern School.

== Legal career ==
McClemans was one of the first graduates of the law school at the University of Western Australia in 1930. She was admitted to the Bar on 16 May 1933. When McClemans and her friend Molly Kingston were unable to find work in a law firm they set up the first all woman law firm in Western Australia. She was the first woman barrister to appear before the Supreme Court of Western Australia. McClemans held several leadership roles in the legal profession including secretary of the Western Australia Law Society, foundation member of the Western Australia Legal Aid Commission, and the State Parole Board of Western Australia.

== Military service ==
McClemans enlisted in the Women's Royal Australian Naval Service (WRANS) in 1943 during the Second World War. She entered the first WRANS officer training course at HMAS Cerberus in Westernport, Victoria, and rose to the rank of chief officer and was appointed Director of the WRANS from 1944.

== Awards ==
McClemans was appointed an Officer of the Order of the British Empire in 1951, and a Companion of the Order of St Michael and St George in 1977. She was also awarded the Queen Elizabeth II Silver Jubilee Medal in 1977. Her portrait painted by Nora Heysen is in the collection of the Australian War Memorial, Canberra.

== Personal life ==
McClemans married Frank Morrison Kenworthy (1899–1976) in 1949. She died in Dalkeith, Western Australia, on 10 June 1988.

Military offices
New office	Director of the Women's Royal Australian Naval Service; 1944–1947	WRANS disbanded Title next held by Chief Officer Blair Bowden in 1950
