= Elizabeth Gaines =

Western Australian business woman

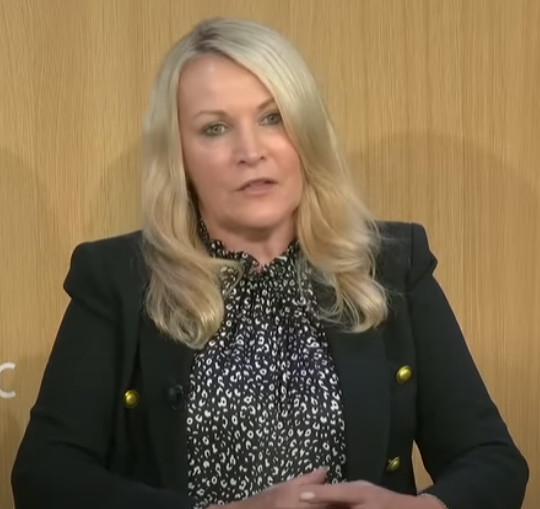
- Speaking at the 2023 World Economic Forum
- Education: Curtin University; Macquarie University

Elizabeth Gaines is an Australian businessperson who has held senior roles with Entertainment Rights, Heytesbury, Helloworld, Fortescue and the West Coast Eagles.

== Education ==
Gaines attended Perth Modern School. She graduated from Curtin University and received a Master's in Applied Finance from Macquarie University.

== Career ==
Gaines was Chief Executive Officer of Heytesbury from 1997 to 2005. She also was Chief Financial Officer of Stella Group and Entertainment Rights.

In 2008, Gaines joined travel company Helloworld. She was CFO of the company and became CEO in April 2014. In June 2015, she resigned as Helloworld's CEO.

Gaines joined the board of Fortescue in 2013, while still CFO of Helloworld. She was the company's first female non-executive director. Gaines was appointed CEO of Fortescue in November 2017 succeeding Nev Power. Before becoming CEO, she was Fortescue's CFO.

Gaines departed the CEO role in August 2022, intending remain with the company as an executive director on the board and as Fortescue's global green hydrogen ambassador.

Having joined the West Coast Eagles board in 2022, in January 2025 Gaines became chair of the club.
