= Betty Judge =

Australian athletics world record holder

Betty Beazley (née Judge; 21 March 1921 – 13 September 2015), known as Betty Judge during her career, was an Australian athletics world record holder at 880 yards, 330 yards and 300 metres. She coached the Olympic champion Shirley Strickland, and was also the mother of Kim Beazley, a former Deputy Prime Minister of Australia and Governor of Western Australia.

== Athletics career ==
Judge's athletics career spanned the period 1939 to 1947. She set world and national records for 880 yards, 330 yards and 300 metres.

On 2 March 1940 Judge broke the world 880 yards record at the Western Australian State Amateur Athletic Championships at Leederville Oval with a time of 2 minutes 24.7 seconds, 1/9 second inside the old world record that was set by Mary Lines in 1922. On 8 February 1947 she broke the record again by 0.5 second during an inter-club championship at Leederville Oval. The Australian record stood until 13 December 1947 when broken by Kit Mears at the Victorian State Championships.

On 13 April 1940 Judge broke the world 300 metres record at the Women's Pageant of Sport at the WACA with a time of 39.9 seconds, 0.1 second inside the world record.

On 15 February 1941 she broke the world 330 yards sprint record at Leederville Oval with a time of 39.8 seconds.

== Coaching and official career ==
Betty Judge was the first coach of Olympic champion Shirley Strickland, who set at least two world records and won seven Olympic Games medals. From 1948 to 1952, as Betty Beazley, she was president of the Australian Women's Amateur Athletics Union.

== Personal life ==
Judge married Australian politician Kim Edward Beazley on 7 February 1948. Although the two had known each other at Perth Modern School and the University of Western Australia, a chance meeting at a church function sparked their whirlwind courtship and marriage. The couple had three children, Kim Christian Beazley (who became Deputy Prime Minister of Australia), Merrilyn Wasson and David Beazley. Betty Beazley was widowed in October 2007; her own death came in September 2015, aged 94.
