= Garrick Agnew =

Australian swimmer and businessman

Sir Garrick Agnew
Personal information
- Full name: Robert David Garrick Agnew
- National team: Australia
- Born: 21 September 1930 Nedlands, Western Australia
- Died: 3 August 1987 (aged 56) Crawley, Western Australia

Sport
- Sport: Swimming
- Strokes: Freestyle
- College team: Ohio State University
Medal record
Men's swimming
Representing Australia
British Empire Games
Gold medal – first place	1950 Auckland	440 yd freestyle
Silver medal – second place	1950 Auckland	4×220 yd freestyle

Sir Robert David Garrick Agnew CBE (21 September 1930 – 3 August 1987) was an Australian competition swimmer and businessman. As a swimmer Agnew represented Australia at the 1948 and 1952 Summer Olympics, as well as the 1950 British Empire Games. After retiring from swimming he entered business, becoming involved in the resources industry in Western Australia.

== Early life ==
Agnew was born 21 September 1930 in the Perth suburb of Nedlands to Robert and Jean Agnew (née Dorothy Jean McHarg Wilson). As a boy he attended Perth Modern School. After graduating he attended the University of Western Australia (UWA) from 1949 studying engineering. In 1950 received an offer to attend Yale University on an athletic scholarship where he would swim alongside his Australian rival John Marshall. He eventually chose to attend Ohio State University. His passage to America involved working in the engine room of a ship between Brisbane and Vancouver. He was a member of the Ohio State branch of Phi Beta Kappa Society. He graduated with a Bachelor of Science in 1952. Two years later he finished a Master of Business Administration degree at Harvard University in 1954.

== Swimming ==
As a 17-year-old Agnew went to the 1948 Summer Olympics in London, competing in the 400-metre and 1500 metre freestyle events though he did not make it past the heats.

He was the men's 440 yards freestyle champion and was part of the 4×220 yards freestyle relay team that came second at the 1950 British Empire Games in Auckland, New Zealand.

At the 1952 Summer Olympics in Helsinki, he again competed in the 400 and 1500-metre events, again not advancing past the preliminary heats.

Agnew retired from swimming 1954, citing a desire to enter business.

== Business ==
Agnew spent time in 1954 working in Manila with Gus Trippe, an American he met at Harvard. On returning to Perth in 1955, Agnew was part of a partnership, including Trippe, that purchased a steam boat to ship live cattle from Anna Plains Station in northwest Western Australia to The Philippines. This was the first time cattle had been shipped live out of the state.

He soon extended his business interests to mining salt and iron ore. He formed a partnership with Harold Clough during the 1970s. In 1977 Mount Enid Mining Company, controlled by Agnew, sold its interests in the Robe River mining project for over A$21 million.

In 1980, Agnew led a group proposing the establishment of a new Australian trading bank. This resulted in the opening of Australian Bank in early 1981, with Agnew as its first chairman.

== Game fishing ==
Agnew was a keen fisherman. He regularly made a trip of over 4,800 kilometres (3,000 mi) from Perth to Cairns to catch large fish. In 1983 he set a Western Australian record when he caught a 319 kg (703 lb) Pacific blue marlin. He was inducted into the International Game Fish Association Hall of Fame in 2003.

== Honours ==
Agnew became a Commander of the Order of the British Empire in 1978. In 1982 Agnew was made a Knight Bachelor for "service to industry & commerce". A street, Agnew Way, in Subiaco is named in his honour.

In 2009 Agnew was inducted into the Swimming Western Australia Hall of Fame.

== Death ==
Agnew died in 1987 of a heart attack after swimming at the UWA swimming pool. His ashes were interred at Karrakatta Cemetery.

== See also ==
- List of Commonwealth Games medallists in swimming (men)
