= Alan Barblett =

Australian field hockey player

Personal information
- Full name: Alan James Barblett
- Nationality: Australian
- Born: 17 November 1929 Perth, Western Australia
- Died: 18 November 2012 (aged 83) Claremont, Australia

Sport
- Sport: Field hockey

Alan Barblett (17 November 1929 – 18 November 2012) was an Australian field hockey player, lawyer and philanthropist. As a sportsman, Barblett competed in the men's field hockey tournament at the 1956 Summer Olympics.

Barblett graduated from the University of Western Australia with a law degree and arts degree majoring in philosophy and psychology. He joined the council of Western Australian Institute of Technology (WAIT, now Curtin University) in 1970.

Barblett Oval on the Bentley campus of the university is named in his honour.
