= Women's Royal Australian Naval Service =

Former women's branch of the Royal Australian Navy

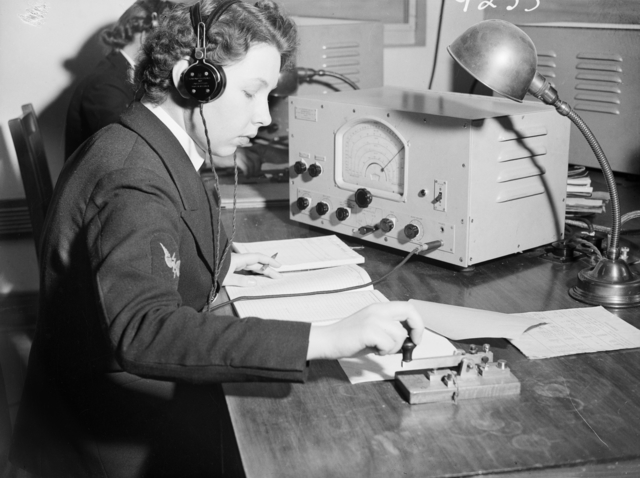
A member of the Women's Royal Australian Naval Service at HMAS Harman in 1941

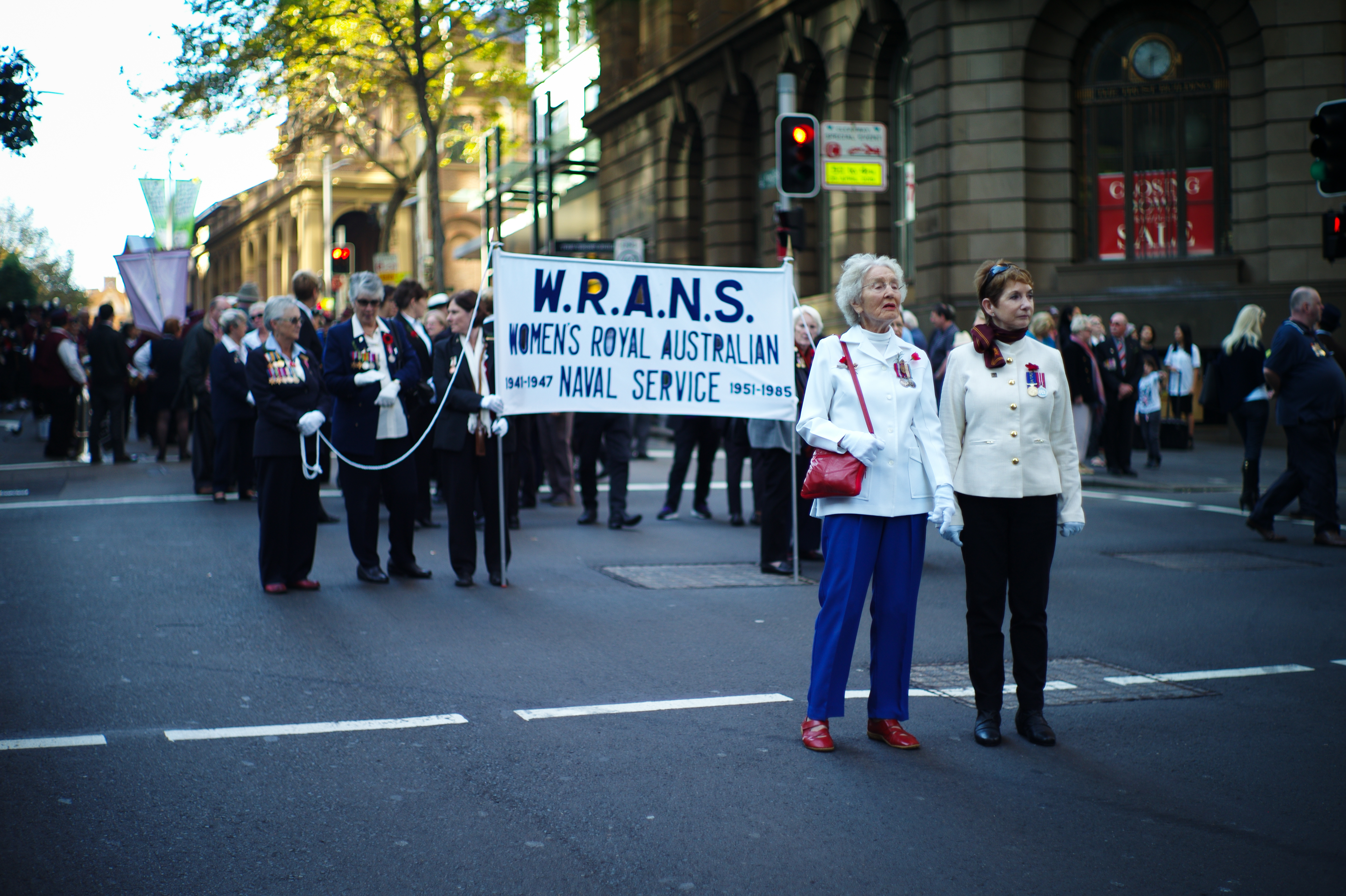
WRANS at the Sydney 2015 Anzac Day march

The Women's Royal Australian Naval Service (WRANS) was the women's branch of the Royal Australian Navy (RAN). In 1941, fourteen members of the civilian Women's Emergency Signalling Corps (WESC) were recruited for wireless telegraphy work at the Royal Australian Navy Wireless/Transmitting Station Canberra, as part of a trial to free up men for service aboard ships. Although the RAN and the Australian government were initially reluctant to support the idea, the demand for seagoing personnel imposed by the Pacific War saw the WRANS formally established as a women's auxiliary service in 1942. The surge in recruitment led to the development of an internal officer corps. Over the course of World War II, over 3,000 women served in the WRANS.

The organisation was disbanded in 1947, but was reestablished in 1951 in response to the manpower demand caused by Cold War commitments. In 1959, the WRANS was designated a permanent part of the Australian military. The WRANS continued to operate until 1985, when female personnel were integrated into the RAN.

== History ==
=== Origin and World War II ===
In March 1939, Florence Violet McKenzie set up the Women's Emergency Signalling Corps (WESC) as wireless telegraphy organisation for female volunteers. McKenzie established the WESC because of the threat of war, and her belief that training women in wireless telegraphy, morse code, and related skills meant they could free up men for military service. By August 1940, there was a waiting list of 600 women for the small school, and WESC-trained telegraphists were teaching men from the armed forces and merchant navy.

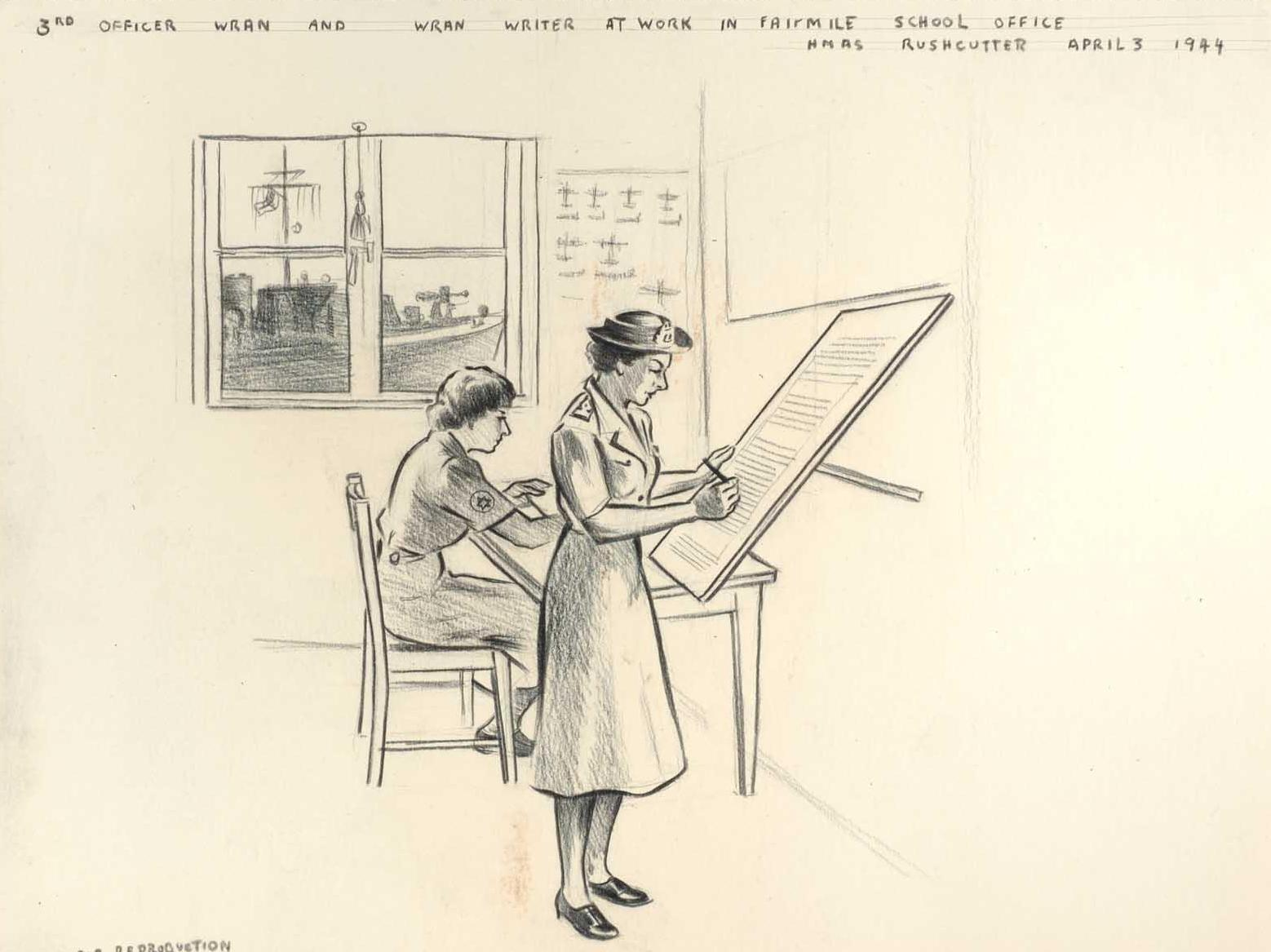
A sketch of two WRANS working in the Fairmile Training School at HMAS Rushcutter by official war artist Rex Julius

Inspired by an article on the Women's Royal Naval Service, McKenzie contacted the RAN on several occasions to suggest that her telegraphists be employed by the RAN. Although initial letters were unanswered, she was eventually contacted by the Director of Signals and Communications, who proposed an experimental trial. There was opposition from both the government and the Australian Commonwealth Naval Board, although they eventually agreed to the trial after realising there were few other sources of trained telegraphists that could meet RAN requirements. Even so, the employment was approved on the condition that there was no publicity attached to the recruitment. Fourteen women from the WESC (12 telegraphists and 2 cooks) were accepted for naval service on 28 April 1941 and employed at the Royal Australian Navy Wireless/Transmitting Station Canberra. Six months later, another nine women were recruited. Although treated as naval personnel, the women were technically civilian employees of the RAN. Despite the formation of women's auxiliaries in the Army and Air Force, the RAN remained reluctant to formally enlist the telegraphists.

The increasing demand for manpower in the Pacific War resulted in a change of opinion in the RAN, with increasing recruitment of female personnel, and public promotion of the service. Approval to form a Women's Royal Australian Naval Service of 580 personnel (280 telegraphists plus 300 other duties) was granted on 24 July 1942, and the initial WESC telegraphists were offered enlistment on 1 October 1942. The scale of the response to recruitment campaigns was unexpected, with over 1,000 women enlisted by the end of 1942. This prompted the RAN to establish an officer corps within the WRANS, with the first training course for female officers beginning at Flinders Naval Depot on 18 January 1943, and a further 16 courses run by September 1945.

Women recruited into the WRANS were not permitted to serve at sea, but were able to fill most shore-based positions. WRANS performed a variety of duties, including working as telegraphists, clerks, drivers, stewards, cooks, Sick Berth Attendants, and some technical areas (such as ship degaussing ranges), and intelligence and cryptanalysis. Ruby Boye, the only woman to serve in the Coastwatchers organisation, was commissioned as an honorary WRANS officer. It was hoped that this commissioning (along with the WRANS uniform air-dropped to her) would see the Japanese treat her as a member of the armed forces if she was captured.

Over 3,000 women enlisted in the WRANS during World War II, with 2,671 active at the war's end: 10% of the overall RAN strength, but significantly fewer than the 18,000 each in the Women's Auxiliary Australian Air Force and Australian Women's Army Service. The WRANS was disbanded in 1947, with all personnel discharged by 1948.

=== 1951 reestablishment ===
In 1950, pressure on naval manpower from Cold War commitments prompted the RAN to reestablish the WRANS, albeit reluctantly, with every other possible option examined first. The decision was announced on 18 June 1950, with formal inauguration at the start of 1951. Wartime WRANS could re-enlist, but their previous service was not recognised for pay or advancement. Women could only occupy specifically designated shore posts, and would be discharged if they married or became pregnant. Despite these restrictions, there were 1,500 applications for the initial 250 positions. The postwar WRANS operated on a policy of taking over shore duties to free up RAN personnel for at-sea service: a policy described as "a Wran in, a man out".

In December 1959, the WRANS were granted permanent status. By the start of the 1970s, there were almost 700 women serving in the WRANS, including postings at all nine RAN shore establishments, and personnel accompanying the Naval Communications Detachment based in Singapore.

The WRANS' senior officers campaigned to expand the service and remove restrictions that hampered recruitment and retention. In 1969, the restriction on married women was removed, and the automatic discharge of pregnant women was dropped in 1974. In 1975, Prime Minister Gough Whitlam announced the intention to investigate the posting of women to ships on non-combat deployments. By 1978, WRANS personnel were receiving equal pay to their RAN counterparts.

=== Integration ===
The Sex Discrimination Act 1984 made separate women's branches for the Australian Defence Force unsustainable.

In 1985, the regulations relating to the WRANS were repealed, and female personnel were integrated into the RAN.

=== Directors ===
The directors of the WRANS were:

- Chief Officer Sheila McClemans (1944–47)
- Chief Officer Blair Bowden (1950–54)
- First Officer Joan Cole (1954–56)
- First Officer Elizabeth Hill (1956–58)
- Captain Joan Streeter (1958–73)
- Captain Barbara MacLeod (1973–79)
- Commander June Baker (1979–83)
- Commander Marcia Chalmers (1983–85)

== Ranks and uniforms ==
For the first six months, WRANS used the green WESC uniform set up by McKenzie. Naval tailors copied the Women's Royal Naval Service uniform, and clothing was available by July 1941, but without shoes. The uniform was a winter outfit with a jacket with two rows of three buttons, a skirt, blouse, hat, tie and underwear. Later a summer uniform with a dress, belt and socks was issued. The dress had a wide white collar and buttons down the front.

Ranks of the WRANS
WRANS rank	Equivalent RAN rank
Chief Officer	Commander
First Officer	Lieutenant Commander
Second Officer	Lieutenant
Third Officer	Sub-Lieutenant
Chief Petty Officer	Chief Petty Officer
Petty Officer	Petty Officer
Leading Wran	Leading Seaman
Wran	Able Seaman

== See also ==
- Women in the Australian military
- Women's Royal Naval Service, the equivalent British service
- Royal Australian Naval Nursing Service, another all-female branch of the RAN
- Female roles in the World Wars
