= Perth Modern School =

School in Subiaco, Western Australia

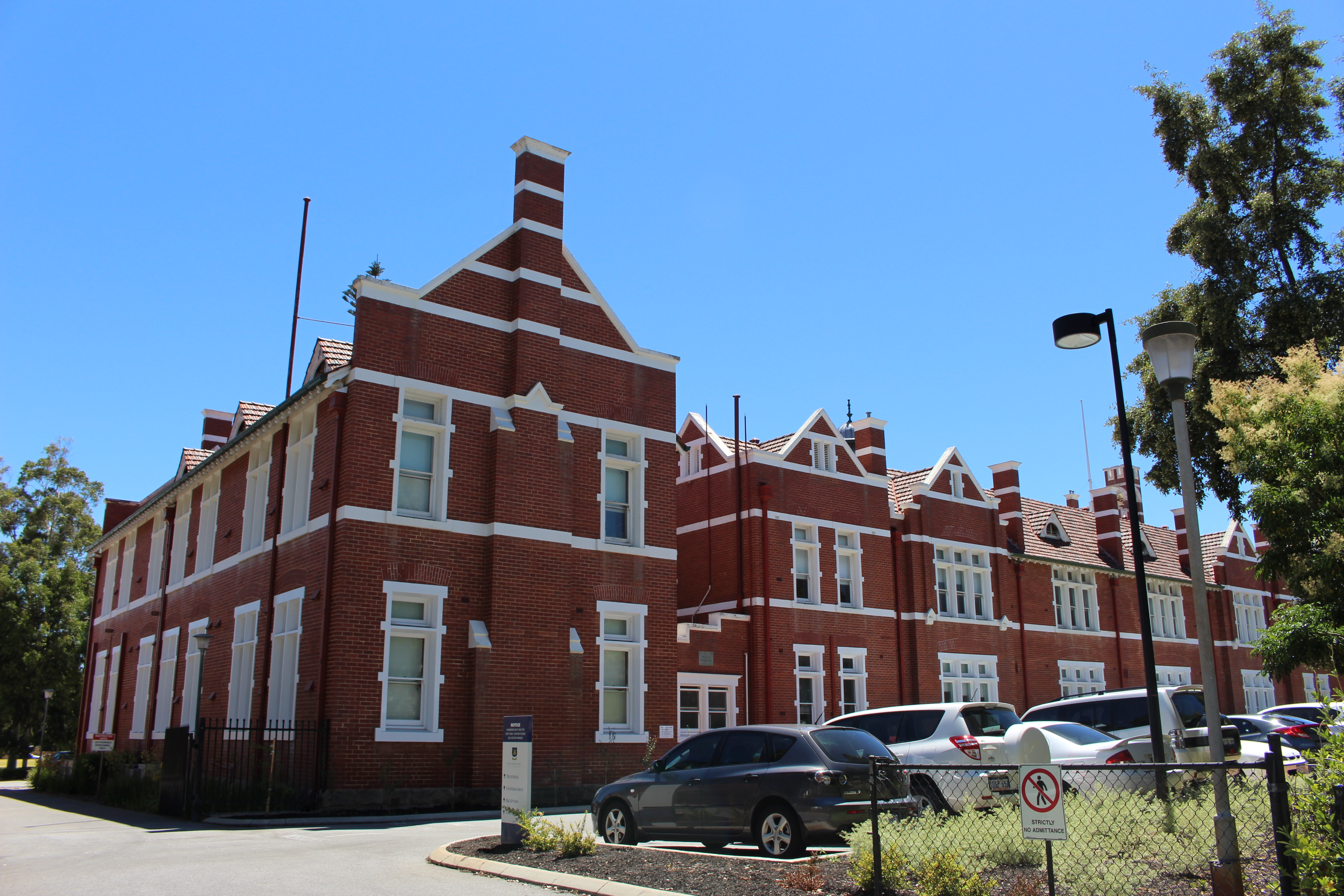

Location
- Subiaco, Perth, Western Australia; Australia; 31°56′42″S 115°50′16″E

Information
- Type: Public co-educational academically selective high day school
- Motto: French: Savoir C'est Pouvoir (Knowledge is Power)
- Established: 1911; 115 years ago
- Principal: Mitchell Mackay
- Years: 7–12
- Enrolment: 1,455 (2022)
- Campus type: Urban
- Colours: navy blue, gold & red
- Song: Latin: Moderna Scola (Modern School)
- Nickname: Perth Mod
- ATAR average: 96.45 (2021)
- Yearbook: The Sphinx
- Alumni: Perth Modernians
- Website: perthmodern.wa.edu.au

Register of the National Estate
- Official name: Perth Modern School West Building including Main Hall
- Type: Historic
- Designated: 21 March 1978
- Reference no.: 10404

Western Australia Heritage Register
- Type: Individual Building or Group
- Designated: 14 December 2001
- Reference no.: 2450
- Child Places: Thomas Street State School Memorial Gates 13029; Old Modernians War Memorial & Honour Roll 15689

Perth Modern School (colloquially known as Perth Mod or Mod) is a public co-educational academically selective high school, located in Subiaco, an inner city suburb of Perth, Western Australia. Perth Modern is Western Australia's only fully academically selective public school. Established in 1911, the school is both the oldest public high school and the oldest co-educational high school in Western Australia (WA).

== History ==
=== Planning and construction ===
Perth Modern School was the first government high school in WA. Although funds were allocated to build the school in 1907, the west building and main hall contract was not tendered until 1909 due to debate continuing for some time.

=== Opening and academic scholarships ===
The school opened in 1911 with 226 students enrolled. The school charged a fee of £6 a year. Students were prepared for entry to the University of Western Australia, which opened in 1913. Demand for places at the school was high and students came from all over WA. In 1912, the school began offering scholarships designed to encourage students to attend regardless of their financial situations.

Cecil Andrews, Inspector General of Schools, was responsible for naming the school and directing its school curriculum.

==== Educational concepts ====
When it opened, Perth Modern School introduced three concepts into WA education:

1. Co-education
2. No corporal punishment, detention, or arbitrary/authoritative punishment
3. The teaching of modern languages (such as French), and rejection of Classical studies as the core of the curriculum

Prior to Perth Modern School, the only high schools in WA were eight independent schools. These schools were sectarian, unisex, high fee paying schools, and only three catered for girls.

=== Local-intake school and music scholarships ===
In 1958 Perth Modern School became a local-intake school, with no academic entrance requirements and accepting primarily students who lived nearby. In 1968 music became a focus of the school, with the first music scholarships awarded; the last intake of students on a music scholarship occurred in 2006. By 1970, the school orchestra was formed and the Joseph Parsons Memorial Library opened. A home for English as a second language was opened in the former Thomas Street Primary School located on the school grounds, and was run by Perth Modern School.

=== Return to academic selection ===
In 2005, a return to academic selection was announced so as to better serve the needs of WA's gifted students. Perth Modern School began to take in students on the basis of academic selection in 2007 for years 8, 10 and 11. By 2011 (the centenary of the school's opening) all students had been selected through the Gifted and Talented Program. The gifted program in WA is based on Francois Gagne's Differentiated Model of Giftedness and Talent.

== Governance ==
In 2012, Perth Modern became an Independent Public School.

== School structure ==
Despite the worldwide acceptance of corporal punishment in education at the time of the school's opening, as a tool to enforce authority, students were instead encouraged to develop self-discipline and motivation through the message that education was the key to future success. This is reflected through the motto "Savoir C'est Pouvoir" (Knowledge is Power) and the school emblem of the Sphinx (a reference to the character in Oedipus) which represented knowledge and wisdom.

Although Perth Modern has always been a co-educational school, when it initially opened in 1911, boys and girls were still kept apart in different classrooms and entrances. However, as a co-educational school, it was able to provide the same quality of education to girls as was provided to the boys of the school.

=== House system ===
Perth Modern School was excluded by WA private schools from joining established interschool sporting competitions. In 1915, Red, Blue, Gold and Sphinx factions were created to promote sporting rivalry. In 2007, a new house system was introduced to promote competition, recognition of achievement, and participation in extracurricular activities. The houses were named after the school's first four principals: Fredrick Brown, Joseph Parsons, Noel Sampson and Talbot Downing. Awards are given to students who achieve a certain number of required house points. Annually, the house which has achieved the most points is recognised as the Champion House.

== Admissions ==
All students attend Perth Modern School based on their performance in the Academic Selective Entrance Test, which has been criticised for unfairly advantaging those from privileged backgrounds. Of 2,563 students who sat the test in order to begin schooling in 2020, 225 were accepted.

In 2019, the school was criticised for its lack of socio-educationally disadvantaged students, with 98% of students coming from above-average socio-educational backgrounds, and for having no Indigenous Australian students. Nationally, the school is the second most advantaged, behind only Sydney Grammar School. This prompted calls for changes to the WA system for assessing and supporting gifted students, as the school should reflect the diversity of gifted people. Myriad barriers to inclusivity at the school were noted, including its location in an affluent area and that many advantaged students access tutoring for the entrance test from early primary school.

== Curriculum ==
When the school first opened, students studied comprehensive science and modern languages as part of their courses, in addition to classical subjects. Until 1928, students attended Perth Modern for four years. The focus of the first two years was on basic subjects, whereas the final two years focused on a more diverse range of subjects. Students could choose from five streams: arts, science, education, commerce and agriculture.

Today, the school primarily teaches based on the Australian Curriculum.

== Performing arts ==
=== Dance ===
Perth Modern School hosts the independent Graduate College of Dance, from which a number of acclaimed high-profile dancers have graduated. The Graduate College of Dance is a leading vocational dance school in Australia. The College prepares talented dancers aged 9 to 17 (year 5 to 12) for the dance profession. The college's comprehensive curriculum combines professional dance training with an academic education to tertiary level. The college is a private organisation requiring fees from applicants, enrolled students at Perth Modern School and private students from elsewhere. The Department of Education and Training previously accommodated the Graduate College of Dance at Swanbourne Senior High School. With the amalgamation of Swanbourne into Shenton College in 2000, the department offered the Graduate College of Dance accommodation at the Perth Modern School site due to the availability of appropriate space and suitable dance flooring.

=== Drama ===
Perth Modern presents a biennial musical production featuring live music performed by students. The first production was in 2014, and was a production of 'The Wizard of Oz'. This was followed by 'High School Musical' in 2016, 'Little Shop of Horrors' in 2018, 'Grease' in 2020, 'Legally Blonde' in 2022, 'The Addams Family' in 2024 and 'We Will Rock You' in 2026. Perth Modern has also put on a variety of other productions throughout each school year, for the year 10, 11 & 12 drama classes

== Campus ==
=== List of buildings ===
In 2013 the school's buildings were renamed after several people who had made significant contributions to the school. The school campus consists of the following buildings and centres, notable either in their own right or due to their namesake:

Building name	Opened	Main use	Namesake	Notes
Andrews Building	1961	Administration, mathematics, science	Cecil Andrews, the WA Inspector General of Schools when Perth Modern opened	
Beasley Building	1911	Auditorium, humanities and social sciences, languages, music	Hillson Beasley, the building's architect	Original building of Perth Modern School.
Gardham Building	2009	Design and technology	Walter Amos Gardham, the founding Manual Training Teacher from 1911 to 1930	
Mills Building	2009	Visual arts, languages, food science, multimedia/computer science	Frank Mills, a senior art teacher from 1939 to 1957	
Parsons Building	2009	Cafeteria, lecture theatre, library, study hall	Joseph Parsons, the Headmaster of Perth Modern School from 1912 to 1939	The Library replaced the Joseph Parsons Memorial Library, which was demolished in 2009.
Stokes Building	1904	English, Year 7 area	John P Stokes, the headmaster at Thomas Street Primary School from 1949 to 1951 and principal of Perth Modern from 1972 to 1979	Originally West Perth School (1904-1906) and then Thomas Street Primary School (1906-1979).
Tyler McCusker Sports Centre	2015, 1964	Assembly area, gymnasium	Malcolm McCusker and Don Tyler, alumni who made significant donations to the building's construction	Consists of a complex of two buildings, one of which was built earlier but shares the same name.
Cyril Tyler Auditorium	2021	Music, Drama and Dance performances.	With Modernian Don Tyler once again making a significant donation to another one of Perth Modern's building projects, Don was given the choice of what it was to be named. Don chose to name it after his stepfather, Cyril, who raised him from a young age after his biological father died when Don was just 28 days old.	

=== Beasley building ===
==== Construction ====
Until 2013, the Beasley building was known as the West building. At the time of its construction from 1909 to 1911, the building was Perth Modern's first and only building. The new school was built on land which was formerly part of the northern common in Subiaco, which had been set aside for education purposes. This land was 4 hectares (10 acres) in area and was located between Subiaco and Mueller Roads (later renamed Roberts Road), west of Thomas Street in Subiaco. On 30 July 1909, S B Alexander was awarded the building contract for £11,637. The contract for the west building and main hall specified eight classrooms, art room, library, chemistry and physics laboratories, lecture rooms, as well as cookery and laundry classrooms. These facilities were grouped around the 27.4m by 14.3m (90 ft by 47 ft) central hall. The building was designed by Hillson Beasley, Principal Architect of WA. By 1911, the building was completed for the sum of £18,974.

==== Design ====
Beasley's design of the west building and main hall comprised three parallel two storey wings facing north and south with a courtyard to the west. The west building is linked by a covered walkway to the third heritage listed wing. The building was typical of Beasley's mixture of formality and informality, with interesting interiors serving ritualised assemblies and examinations. The building reflected many key characteristics of Federation Arts and Crafts architecture. It was constructed from red brick with a stone base facade. Decorative exterior features included white painted cement rending to all framing, quoins, and copings. The design and construction also featured a central landmark clock tower with a battlemented parapet, a tapering roof lantern, and dormer windows. The roofs were designed and built with steeply pitched parapeted gables covered with tiles, and with prominent eaves and exposed ends to rafters. The main hall was set two storeys high with a jarrah ceiling. Carved, sloped, roof rafters were designed to give the interior of the building an ecclesiastical feel. The gallery was built spanning east and west on the first floor with staircases at each end. Other notable details of fine design and craftsmanship of west building included the stained glass transom windows and fanlights executed in Art Nouveau style at the north side of the building and inside the entrance foyer.

==== Refurbishment and heritage listing ====
The west building was refurbished during the late 1980s and the work was recognised and received several awards. The west building and main hall had interim registration by the Heritage Council of WA in 1992, and it entered the State Registry of Historical Places in 2001. The building was included on the basis of aesthetics and by the number of notable alumni who hailed from these doors.

=== Andrews building ===
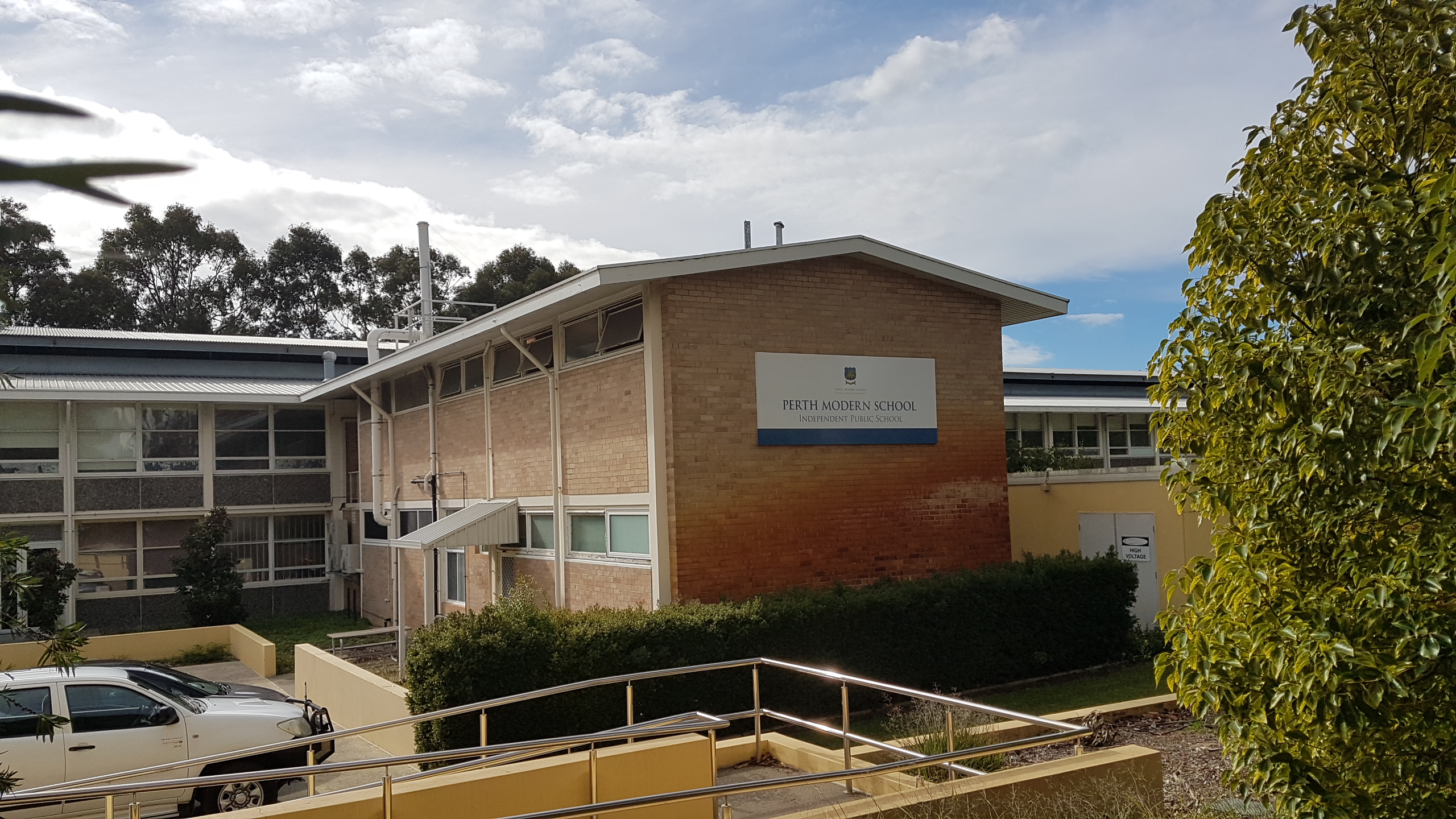
Andrews building, as seen from Roberts Rd

Prior to 2013, the Andrews Building was known as the East building. The East building and older gymnasium were built around 1958, when Perth Modern became a local-intake school. Both buildings have been listed as well sited bearing a functionalist aesthetic. The design and construction have been recognised as fine examples of post-war International style. The new administration building (opened 2009) joins and provides lift access to the east building.

=== War memorial ===
The Old Modernians War Memorial was unveiled on 22 October 1922 to commemorate the service of ex-students in World War I. During the war, 186 Modernians enlisted, 29 of whom lost their lives as a result of their service. The names of 24 Modernians are recorded on the monument. Five names are recorded on a plinth added to the monument in 2020. The memorial was designed by William Hardwick, the Principal Architect of WA in 1920, and it is located between the Administration building and the oval. Details of the students' military service are recorded on a digital honour board on the school's website.

=== City Beach Residential College ===
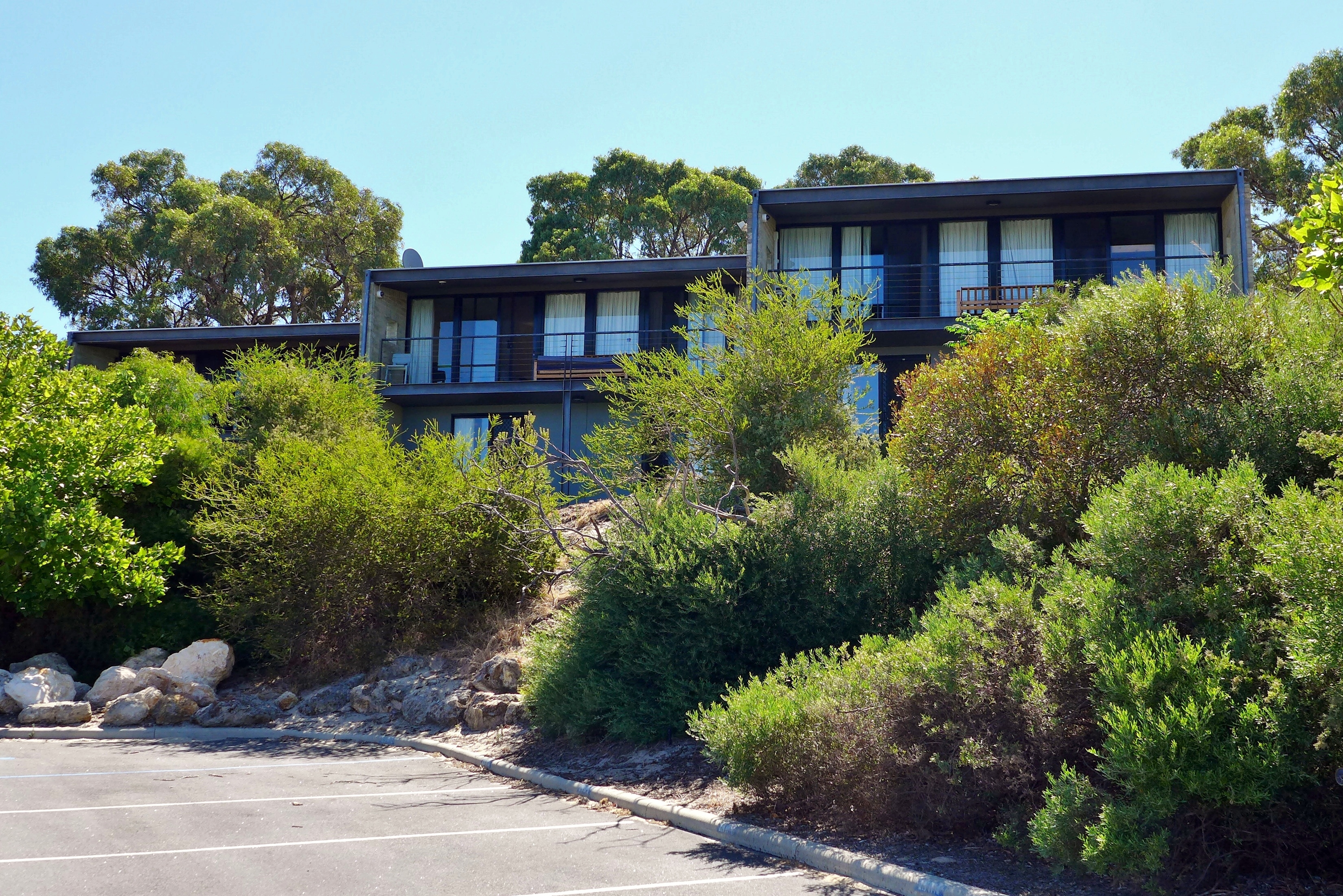
Housing at the College

Students from regional areas can board at City Beach Residential College. The college is located in City Beach. It is the only boarding facility for students of public schools in metropolitan Perth. It can accommodate up to 66 boarders from rural WA. However, it is not exclusively for Perth Modern students; students who are enrolled in selective gifted and talented programs in metropolitan Perth public schools (mainly John Curtin College of the Arts and Perth Modern School) can board there. As of 2018 the College accommodates 56 students.

=== Raise the Roof campaign ===
In 2016, the 'Raise the Roof' fundraising campaign was launched to raise funds to build a 700-seat auditorium. The campaign was criticised by members of the school's community. In 2016, students were suspended for criticising the principal via cartoons and social media. Their criticisms arose from funds advertised as being raised for the Princess Margaret Hospital Foundation being partially used for the Raise the Roof project. In 2017 an independent review of the project, initiated by the Department of Education, was published. The review was prompted by a letter sent to the Department's Director-General by 10 of the 15 board members, describing a loss of confidence in the principal, Lois Joll, due to a lack of consultation on issues including Raise the Roof. The review found fault on both sides, and requested that the Department of Education clarify the role of school boards and appropriate fund allocation. The Director-General chose to keep Joll as principal, describing her as "highly competent". Over the following four months, five members of the school board resigned, including Erica Smyth and the former P&C president. In 2019, the fundraising target to build 500 seats was reached. The Education Department subsequently organised a tender for the first stage of construction. Construction ceremonially began in May 2020, with the building officially opening on September 11, 2021.

== Heads of school ==
The following individuals have served as either Headmaster or Principal of Perth Modern School:

[^] denotes an interim headmaster/principal:

Title	Officeholder	Term dates	Notes
Headmaster	Fredrick Brown	1911–1912	
Headmaster	Joseph Parsons	1912–1939	
Headmaster	Noel Sampson	1940–1958	
Principal	Noel Sampson	1959–1963	
Principal	Talbot Downing	1964–1965	
Principal	William Speering	1966–1971	
Principal	Joseph Stokes	1972–1979	
Principal	Thomas Byers	1980–1991	
Principal	Eric Alcock	1992–1999	
Principal	Robyn White	2000–2010	
Principal	Lois Joll	2011–2021	
Principal	Mike Morgan^	2021–2022	
Principal	Mitchell Mackay	2022–	

== Academic achievements ==
Perth Modern students consistently perform well in the Western Australian Certificate of Education school rankings. Since 2016, the year 12 cohorts have produced the highest median ranking when compared to the rest of the schools in WA (refer table below).

Since 2011, year 12 students' results in WA are reported as an Australian Tertiary Admission Rank. Perth Modern students achieved the highest all-time median ATAR score for Western Australia in 2018. The record was raised again by Perth Modern students in 2020.

Since 2022, the School Curriculum and Standards Authority has stopped publishing median ATARs, but analysis by The West Australian using the number of subjects in which students receive awards has placed the school first in Western Australia in 2022 and 2023.

Western Australia ATAR student performance

Year	Rank	Median ATAR	Eligible students	Students with ATAR	% Students with ATAR
2021	1	96.45	TBA	TBA	TBA
2020	1	97.55	242	242	100
2019	1	96.75	241	238	98.76
2018	1	97	240	236	98.33
2017	1	95.9	223	222	99.55
2016	1	95.55	222	220	99.1

=== Beazley Medal winners ===
Since 1984, a Beazley Medal has been presented to the top ranked academic student in WA each year. As of 2024, eight Perth Modern Students have won the award:

- 2024: Ethan Yap
- 2022: Jessica Doan
- 2021: Lawrence Nheu
- 2018: Pooja Ramesh
- 2016: Caitlin Revell
- 2015: Hui Min Tay
- 2014: Jamin Wu
- 2010: Michael Taran

== Participation in International Olympiads ==
These following Perth Modern students have competed in one of the International Olympiads:

=== International Junior Science Olympiad ===
- Atharva Sathe, 2021, Silver
- Ishika Balram, 2023, Silver

=== International Chemistry Olympiad ===
- Hyerin Park, 2015, Bronze
- Hui Min Tay, 2015, Bronze
- Keith Wong, 2021, Bronze

=== International Geography Olympiad ===
- Ben Bauer, 2025, Bronze

== Notable alumni ==
Perth Modern School alumni are known as Perth Modernians. In 2010, The Age reported that Perth Modern ranked equal fourth among Australian schools based on the number of alumni who had received a top Order of Australia and was the top ranked WA school. Fourteen Perth Modernians have won Rhodes Scholarships from the University of Western Australia.

Notable Perth Modernians include:

- Garrick Agnew – Olympic swimmer, businessman, author
- Caitlin Bassett, Netballer
- Margaret Battye – lawyer, female rights activist
- Kim Beazley Sr. – teacher, Federal Minister for Education 1972–75
- Phillip Bennett – General, Chief of the Australian Defence Force 1984–87, 23rd Governor of Tasmania 1987–95
- Len Buckeridge – founder of BGC
- Herbert Coombs – economist, 1st Governor of the Reserve Bank of Australia 1960-68
- Chris Dawson – Commissioner of Police, 34th Governor of Western Australia
- Wally Foreman - sports commentator and senior administrator
- Elizabeth Gaines – business, first female CEO of Fortescue
- Boronia Lucy (Bonnie) Giles (1909–1978) – journalist
- Ron Grey – soldier 1948-1983, Commissioner of Australian Federal Police 1983-88
- Rolf Harris – entertainer, artist, musician, child sex offender
- Paul Hasluck – 17th Governor-General of Australia, Cabinet minister
- Bob Hawke – 23rd Prime Minister of Australia, ACTU President
- John Hay – leader in academia
- Helen Hodgson – MLC for North Metropolitan Region 1997-2001
- Janet Holmes a Court – benefactor, former board member of the Reserve Bank, former Pro Chancellor of the University of Western Australia.
- Ralph Honner – Lieutenant Colonel, Australian Ambassador to Ireland
- Betty Judge-Beazley – athletics world records holder
- John La Nauze – historian
- Katherine Langford – actress
- Malcolm McCusker – 31st Governor of Western Australia
- Emma Matthews – lyric soprano, Opera Australia
- Ken Michael – 30th Governor of Western Australia
- Maxwell Newton – first editor The Australian
- Lawrence O'Donnell – Lieutenant General, Chief of the General Staff 1987–90
- Alan Seymour – playwright, author of The One Day of the Year
- Ralph Slatyer – first Chief Scientist of Australia
- John Stone – Secretary to the Treasury, Australian Senator
- Judyth Watson – Labor MLA for Canning (1986-1989), Kenwick (1989-1996)
- Daryl Williams – Attorney General of Australia
- Albert Wolff – Chief Justice of Western Australia

== See also ==
- List of schools in the Perth metropolitan area
