= List of judges of the Supreme Court of Western Australia =

Judges who have served on the Supreme Court of Western Australia, as of August 2018, include:

- Chief Justice of Western Australia
- Presidents of the Court of Appeal
- Judges of Appeal
- Judges
- Acting judges
- Masters

Position	Name	Appointment commenced	Appointment ended	Term in office	Comments	Notes
Chief Justice	Sir Archibald Burt (Note: Sir Francis Burt was the great-grandson of Sir Archibald Burt)	1861	1879	17–18 years		
Chief Justice	Sir Henry Wrenfordsley	1880	1883	2–3 years		
Chief Justice	Sir Alexander Onslow	1883	1901	17–18 years		
Chief Justice	Sir Edward Stone	1901	1905	3–4 years		
Chief Justice	Sir Stephen Parker	1906	1913	6–7		
Chief Justice	Sir Robert McMillan	1914	1931	16–17 years		
Chief Justice	Sir John Northmore	1931	1946	14–15 years		
Chief Justice	Sir John Dwyer	1946	1958	11–12 years		
Chief Justice	Sir Albert Wolff	1959	1969	9–10 years		
Chief Justice	Sir Lawrence Jackson	1969	1977	7–8 years		
Chief Justice	Sir Francis Burt	1977	1988	10–11 years	Appointed Governor	
Chief Justice	David Malcolm	26 May 1988	1 May 2006	17 years, 340 days		
Chief Justice	Wayne Martin	1 May 2006	27 July 2018	12 years, 87 days		
Chief Justice	Peter Quinlan	13 August 2018		7 years, 268 days		
President, Court of Appeal	Christopher Steytler	1 February 2005	31 January 2009	3 years, 365 days		
President, Court of Appeal	Carmel McLure	17 November 2009	15 July 2016	6 years, 240 days		
President, Court of Appeal	Michael Buss	18 July 2016	4 June 2025	8 years, 321 days		
Judge of Appeal	Michael Buss	1 February 2006	4 June 2025	19 years, 123 days		
Judge of Appeal	Graeme Murphy	3 August 2010		15 years, 278 days		
Judge of Appeal	Robert Mazza	16 December 2011		14 years, 143 days		
Judge of Appeal	Robert Mitchell	18 July 2016		9 years, 294 days		
Judge of Appeal	Andrew Beech	24 May 2017		8 years, 349 days		
Judge of Appeal	John Vaughan	4 June 2019		6 years, 338 days		
Judge of Appeal	Stephen Hall	3 October 2022		3 years, 217 days		
Judge	Sir Edward Stone	1883	1905	21–22 years		
Judge	Alfred Hensman	1892	1902	9–10 years		
Judge	John Charles Horsey James	February 1898	January 1899	307–364 days		
Judge	Sir Stephen Parker	1901	1913	11–12 years		
Judge	Frederick Moorhead	24 April 1902	27 November 1902	217 days		
Judge	Sir Robert McMillan	1902	1931	28–29 years		
Judge	Robert Burnside	24 December 1902	8 August 1929	26 years, 227 days		
Judge	John Rooth	1906	1921	14–15 years		
Judge	Sir John Northmore	1914	1946	31–32 years		
Judge	Sir Thomas Draper	1 April 1921	1 July 1939	18 years, 91 days		
Judge	Sir John Dwyer	1929	1958	15–16 years		
Judge	Sir Albert Wolff	1938	1969	30–31 years		
Judge	James Walker	1946	1955	8–9 years		
Judge	Sir Lawrence Jackson	1949	1977	27–28 years		
Judge	Sir John Virtue	1951	1975	23–24 years		
Judge	Roy Nevile	1955	1970	14–15 years		
Judge	Gordon D'arcy	1959	1969	9–10 years		
Judge	John Hale	1960	1973	12–13 years		
Judge	Oscar Negus	1962	1969	6–7 years		
Judge	Sir Francis Burt	1969	1998	28–29 years	Appointed Governor	
Judge	Sir John Lavan	1969	1981	11–12 years		
Judge	John Wickham	1969	1983	13–14 years		
Judge	Alkin Wallace	1972	1991	18–19 years		
Judge	Robert Jones	1973	1982	8–9 years		
Judge	George Wright	1975	1975	1 year		
Judge	Peter Brinsden	1976	1990	13–14 years		
Judge	Charles Smith	1977	1989	11–12 years		
Judge	Geoffrey Kennedy	1981	2001	19–20 years		
Judge	Howard Olney	1982	1988	5–6 years	Appointed to Federal Court	
Judge	William Pidgeon	1982	2001	18–19 years		
Judge	Barry Rowland	1983	1996	12–13 years		
Judge	Paul Seaman	1988	1994	5–6 years		
Judge	Edward Franklyn	1984	1998	13–14 years		
Judge	Robert Nicholson	1988	1994	5–6 years	Appointed to Federal Court	
Judge	Terence Walsh	1988	1998	9–10 years		
Judge	Kerry White	1992	2000	7–8 years		
Judge	David Ipp	1989	2002	12–13 years	Appointed to NSW Court of Appeal	
Judge	Henry Wallwork	1989	2002	12–13 years		
Judge	Michael Murray	1990	2012	21–22 years		
Judge	Robert Anderson	1990	2003	12–13 years		
Judge	Neville Owen	1991	2010	18–19 years		
Judge	Graeme Scott	1992	2003	10–11 years		
Judge	Christopher Steytler	4 October 1994	31 January 2009	14 years, 119 days		
Judge	Kevin Parker	1994	2003	8–9 years	International Criminal Tribunal for former Yugoslavia	
Judge	Desmond Heenan	1995	2000	4–5 years		
Judge	Anthony Templeman	1996	2009	12–13 years		
Judge	Christine Wheeler	30 October 1996	25 February 2010	13 years, 118 days		
Judge	Geoffrey Miller	1998	2009	10–11 years		
Judge	John McKechnie	2 March 1999	22 April 2015	16 years, 51 days		
Judge	Nicholas Hasluck	1 May 2000	7 May 2010	10 years, 6 days		
Judge	Len Roberts-Smith	2000	2007	6–7 years		
Judge	Christopher Pullin	2001	2014	12–13 years		
Judge	Carmel McLure	23 April 2001	15 July 2016	15 years, 83 days		
Judge	Eric Heenan	4 April 2002	23 June 2015	13 years, 80 days		
Judge	Michael Barker	9 August 2002	8 February 2009	6 years, 183 days	Appointed to Federal Court	
Judge	Narelle Johnson	1 August 2003	17 December 2012	9 years, 138 days		
Judge	David Newnes	25 June 2007	21 April 2017	9 years, 331 days		
Judge	Rene Le Miere	2 February 2004	February 2022	22 years, 95 days		
Judge	Lindy Jenkins	2 February 2004		22 years, 95 days		
Judge	Ralph Simmonds	23 February 2004	30 June 2016	12 years, 128 days years		
Judge	Peter Blaxell	2 February 2005	25 February 2011	6 years, 23 days		
Judge	John Chaney	10 February 2009	29 June 2018	9 years, 139 days	formerly a judge of the District Court (WA)	
Judge	Kenneth Martin	20 March 2009		17 years, 49 days		
Judge	Graeme Murphy	28 April 2009		17 years, 10 days		
Judge	Stephen Hall	3 July 2009		16 years, 309 days		
Judge	Robert Mazza	8 March 2010		16 years, 61 days		
Judge	James Edelman	22 July 2011	19 April 2015	3 years, 271 days	Appointed to Federal Court	
Judge	Michael Corboy	19 April 2010		16 years, 19 days		
Judge	Janine Pritchard	11 June 2010		15 years, 331 days		
Judge	Jeremy Allanson	9 August 2010		15 years, 272 days		
Judge	Jeremy Curthoys	10 February 2014		12 years, 87 days		
Judge	Robert Mitchell	1 October 2014		11 years, 219 days		
Judge	Peter Martino	20 April 2015	2018	2–3 years	formerly Chief Judge of the District Court (WA)	
Judge	Paul Tottle	10 August 2015		10 years, 271 days		
Judge	Bruno Fiannaca	31 August 2015		10 years, 250 days		
Judge	Katrina Banks-Smith	8 July 2016	11 February 2018	1 year, 218 days	Appointed to Federal Court	
Judge	Joseph McGrath	28 November 2016		9 years, 161 days		
Judge	Gail Archer	29 May 2017		8 years, 344 days		
Judge	Anthony Derrick	6 March 2018		8 years, 63 days	formerly a judge of the District Court (WA)	
Judge	John Vaughan	30 April 2018		8 years, 8 days		
Judge	Jennifer Smith	27 June 2018		7 years, 315 days		
Judge	Amanda Forrester	1 July 2022		3 years, 311 days		
Acting judge	Jennifer Smith	1 August 2017	27 June 2018	330 days		
Acting judge	Brian Ross Martin	February 2012	November 2012	303 days 247 days	Former Chief Justice of the Northern Territory appointed to preside over the trial of Lloyd Rayney.	
Master	Alfred Stone	1861	1870	8–9 years		
Master	Rowley Loftie	1870	1878	7–8 years		
Master	James Cowan	1878	1889	10–11 years		
Master	Francis Moseley	1889	1920	30–31 years		
Master	Charles Sherard	1919	1921	1–2 years		
Master	Thomas Davies	1921	1939	17–18 years		
Master	Gregory Boylson	1940	1967	26–27 years		
Master	Gordon Staples	1967	1990	22–23 years		
Master	Paul Seaman	1983	1988	4–5 years	Appointed Supreme Court Judge	
Master	Kerry White	1988	1991	2–3 years	Appointed Supreme Court Judge	
Master	Mann Ng	1988	1998	9–10 years		
Master	Theodore Bredmeyer	1990	2002	11–12 years		
Master	John Adams	1992	1996	3–4 years		
Master	Craig Sanderson	27 November 1996	26 June 2023	29 years, 162 days		
Master	David Newnes	24 February 2003	24 June 2007	4 years, 120 days	Appointed Supreme Court Judge	
