= Mykola Mowczan =

Ukrainian-Australian activist (1950– )

- Микола Мовчан
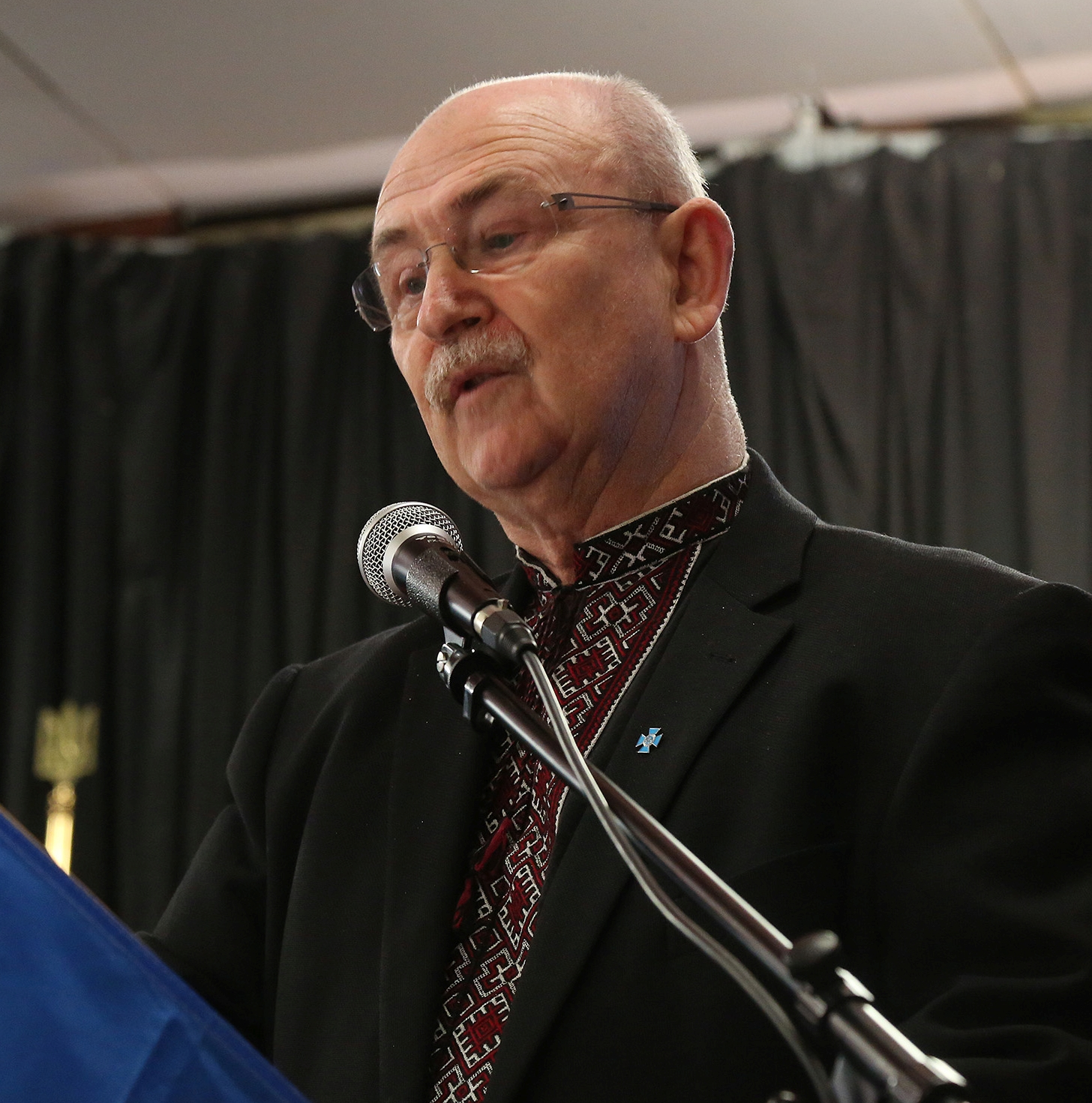
- Mowczan in 2017

Past President of the UAWA
- In office Jan 2004 – Aug 2023

Personal details
- Born: 26 February 1950 Perth, West Australia, Australia
- Profession: Activist

Mykola "Myk" Mowczan (Ukrainian: Микола Наумович Мовчан) is an Australian community leader of Ukrainian descent. He served as president of the Ukrainian Association of Western Australia (UAWA) from 2004 until becoming immediate past president. He has been a prominent advocate for the Ukrainian community in Western Australia, particularly in response to the Russo-Ukrainian War.

== Early life and education ==
Mowczan was born in 1950 to a Ukrainian displaced persons refugee family. He grew up in the Rivervale suburb of Perth and attended Tranby Primary School, Belmont Junior High School, and Governor Stirling Senior High School. He completed his tertiary education at Mt. Lawley Technical College and the Western Australian Institute of Technology (WAIT), now known as Curtin University.

== Community leadership ==
Mowczan has been involved in Ukrainian community organisations for decades. He served as president of the UAWA from 2004, representing a Ukrainian diaspora in Western Australia of more than 500 people. In this role, he coordinated with government officials, organised fundraisers, rallies, and vigils in support of Ukraine.

In May 2022, he represented the Ukrainian community at the announcement of a $500,000 donation by the Western Australian Government to the Ukraine Crisis Appeal.

== Public engagements ==
Mowczan has been a regular speaker at many multicultural events in Western Australia.

- On 6 May 2022, he addressed the Rotary Club of Perth on the UAWA's response to the war in Ukraine.
- On 30 May 2022, he was an invited guest speaker at the 32nd Anniversary of Croatian Statehood Day celebrations at Perth Stadium.
- On 4 June 2022, he delivered a speech at the European Union Consular Group's Europe Day 2022 celebration at Government House Ballroom in Perth. He was the second speaker, following the outgoing Governor of Western Australia, the Honourable Kim Beazley AC.
- In August 2023, Mowczan addressed about 70 people who attended a Ukrainian flag-raising ceremony in the City of Albany, held as a show of solidarity with Ukraine. Among the attendees were approximately 60 Ukrainians from outlying towns.
