= Western Australian Industrial Relations Commission =

The Western Australian Industrial Relations Commission (WAIRC), as constituted under the Industrial Relations Act 1979, conciliates and arbitrates industrial disputes, sets conditions of employment and fixes wages and salaries by making industrial awards, approves enterprise agreements and decides claims of unfair dismissal in the state of Western Australia, with respect to those employers not regulated by the Commonwealth of Australia under the Fair Work Act 2009.

== History ==
The industrial conciliation system, modelled on New Zealand's Industrial Conciliation and Arbitration Act 1894, was created in Western Australia in 1900, before the formation of the Commonwealth of Australia the following year. It provided for the division of the colony (later the state) into Industrial Districts (each with its own Board of Conciliation), the decisions of which were subject to appeal to a Court of Arbitration. The first Board of Conciliation did not commence operation until 11 July 1901, and the Court of Arbitration did not first sit until 2 April 1902.

The Court of Arbitration became the Western Australia Industrial Commission in 1963, and later became the Western Australia Industrial Relations Commission in 1979. The scope of its jurisdiction was significantly restricted in 2006 when the Commonwealth's WorkChoices legislation came into effect, later revised by the Fair Work Act 2009. Of all the states, Western Australia was the only one not to exercise its referral power to delegate further jurisdiction to the Fair Work Commission.

== Jurisdiction ==
The commission has jurisdiction to hear applications for industrial awards in respect of employees and to vary those awards. It also considers applications to register Industrial Agreements between employers and employees. Where there is an industrial dispute, it will consider applications for compulsory conferences to settle those disputes. The commission can also consider applications by employers claiming unfair dismissal or that their contractual rights haven’t been fulfilled.

== Composition ==
The commission consists of a chief commissioner; a senior commissioner; and other commissioners as required. Each is appointed by the Governor of Western Australia. Prior to 2019 a commissioned role of President heard appeals made disputing any tribunal orders or decisions.

The bulk of the work is carried out in the commission by commissioners. However, some work must be dealt in separate divisions of the commission. The Registrar of the courts along with the Deputy Registrars operations internally, executives to the state department hosting multiple tribunal (or quasi-judicial) proceedings before Industrial Magistrates (State justice), Public Appeal Board members (varies), Road Freight Transport Industry Tribunal, Employment Dispute Resolution, Occupational Safety and Health Tribunal.

In 2018 amendments to the states Industrial Relations Act 1979 removed requirements for the president role, and thus the president was abolished with all role duties transferred to the chief commissioner. The president at that time, Jennifer H. Smith, was dual appointed and a sworn judge to the Supreme Court. Notably, former WAIRC President, Jennifer Smith was the only female appointed president when the role became defunct. Circa both roles Smith became the first female senior commissioner appointed in WAIRC. The first female appointed a chief Commissioner was (and is currently) Chief Commissioner P. E. Scott.

A trifecta occurring when Susan Bastian became the first female Registrar as successor to John Spurling as the dual appointed chief executive officer and registrar of the courts; heading the Department of the Registrar. This department provides the registry handling applications from public, state and local agencies, inquiry or even private hosted administration disputes of and provides preliminary conference conciliation aiming to mediation matter resolutions and saving formal court proceeds.

Western Australian Industrial Appeal Court, which hears appeals from decisions of the president (former appeals heard from 2016 or prior), the full bench, and the commission in court session.

The Full Bench of the Western Australian Industrial Relations Commission hears appeals from the decisions of industrial magistrates and commissioners. The full bench was constituted by the president and at least two other commissioners prior to 2019. In the future, it will consist of the chief commissioner and two suitable commission members.

The Western Australian Industrial Relations Commission in Court Session deals with the State Wage Case and other cases of importance that are referred to it. In 2006 the State Wage Case held by WAIRC was the first Australian court to webcast proceedings live to the public. All wage case since and up until 2018 are direct feeds from internal digital court recordings; further to this WAIRC was the first Australian courts to implement Audia digital signal processors from BiAMP. Prior to federal formation of the Australian Fair Work Commission the then AIRC co-located admin services within the Registry to WAIRC.
