= Kenneth Martin =

Kenneth or Ken Martin may refer to:

- Kenneth Martin (English painter) (1905–1984), English painter and sculptor
- Ken Martin (Australian sculptor) (born 1952)
- Kenneth Martin (judge), a former judge of the Supreme Court of Western Australia
- Wayne Martin (cricketer, born 1953) (1953–2026), New Zealand cricketer, full name Kenneth Wayne Martin
- Ken Martin (runner) (born 1958), American long-distance runner
- Ken Martin (born 1973), American politician
