= Natalie Whitby =

Australian jurist

The Honourable Justice Natalie Michelle Whitby

Justice of the Supreme Court of Western Australia
- Incumbent
- Assumed office 22 May 2023

Judge of the District Court of Western Australia
- In office 9 June 2021 – 22 May 2023

Natalie Michelle Whitby is a justice of the Supreme Court of Western Australia. Whitby was appointed as a justice of the Supreme Court of Western Australia on 22 May 2023. Prior to her appointment to the Supreme Court of Western Australia, Whitby was a judge of the District Court of Western Australia.

== Education and early career ==
Whitby graduated from Murdoch University with a Bachelor of Laws and Bachelor of Commerce majoring in accounting. She was admitted as an officer and lawyer of the Supreme Court of Western Australia in 1996. Whitby's first job after university was at an international accounting firm.

In January 1996, she commenced working at the law firm Freehills, which has since become Herbert Smith Freehills. Whitby worked in the commercial litigation team for 15 years. Whilst at Freehills, she also tutored civil procedure at the University of Western Australia.

== Judicial appointments ==
In 2010, Whitby was appointed as a registrar of the Supreme Court of Western Australia. She was also commissioned as a magistrate of Stirling Gardens Magistrates Court. Whitby is an accredited mediator who presided over many mediations during her appointment as registrar. She also presided over various probate, taxation of costs and interlocutory disputes. Whilst a registrar, Whitby also acted as principal registrar and master of the Supreme Court of Western Australia.

In 2021, Whitby was appointed as a judge of the District Court of Western Australia.

In 2023, Whitby was appointed as a justice of the Supreme Court of Western Australia. Here, she presides over matters in both the criminal and civil jurisdiction.

== Personal life ==
Whitby is married to Reece Whitby and has four children: Faith, Sam, Luke and Hope.
