= Christopher Steytler =

Australian justice

The Honourable Christopher David Steytler AO QC

Judge of the Supreme Court of Western Australia
- In office 4 October 1994 – 31 January 2009

President of the Court of Appeal
- In office 1 February 2005 – 31 January 2009
- Preceded by: Inaugural
- Succeeded by: Carmel McLure

Parliamentary Inspector of the Corruption and Crime Commission
- In office 1 February 2009 – 30 June 2012

Personal details
- Born: South Africa
- Education: University of Cape Town University of Western Australia

Christopher David Steytler is a former judge of the Supreme Court of Western Australia and President of the Court of Appeal. He was a member of the Supreme Court from 1994 to 2009 and was the Parliamentary Inspector of the Corruption and Crime Commission from 2009 to 2012.

Steytler was born in South Africa, doing his early years of schooling at St George's Grammar School before graduating from the University of Cape Town and practising as a barrister and solicitor in South Africa prior to emigrating to Western Australia in 1976. He joined the independent bar in 1990, and was appointed Queen's Counsel in January 1993. He was appointed to the Supreme Court in 1994.

On 1 February 2009, following his retirement from the Supreme Court, he commenced as the Parliamentary Inspector of the Western Australian Corruption and Crime Commission. He was an inaugural member of the Independent Media Council from 2012 to 2015.

On 11 June 2012, he was named an Officer of the Order of Australia for distinguished service to the judiciary and to the law, to the advancement and protection of human rights, to legal education, and to professional ethics and standards.

== See also ==
- Judiciary of Australia
