= Lindy Jenkins =

Australian judge

The Honourable Justice Carolyn Frances "Lindy" Jenkins

Judge of the Supreme Court of Western Australia
- Incumbent
- Assumed office 2 February 2004

Judge of the District Court of Western Australia
- In office September 2001 – 1 February 2004

Personal details
- Born: April 1959 (age 67)
- Education: Macquarie University
- Occupation: Judge, lawyer

Carolyn Frances "Lindy" Jenkins (born April 1959, Sydney) is a justice with the Supreme Court of Western Australia, appointed on 2 February 2004. She previously served on the District Court of Western Australia.

Jenkins was born in Sydney, New South Wales, in April 1959. She holds a Bachelor of Arts and Bachelor of Laws from Macquarie University, conferred in 1981, and was admitted to practice in New South Wales and the Northern Territory in 1982, and in Western Australia in 1989. She held the position of Acting Chief Crown Prosecutor in the Northern Territory between 1988 and 1989, then moved to the Crown Solicitor's Office in Western Australia, where she served as Deputy Crown Counsel until 2001. She was also a member of the Law Reform Commission of Western Australia in 2000–2001, before her appointment to the District Court of Western Australia in September 2001.
