= Craig Sanderson =

Craig William Sanderson is the Master of the Supreme Court of Western Australia. He graduated from the University of Western Australia in 1975 with a Bachelor of Jurisprudence and a Bachelor of Laws. While at University he was also Treasurer of the Blackstone Society. In 1978 he left Australia to work in London, and on his return in 1981 became founding partner in Pullinger, Sanderson and Workman. He joined the independent bar in 1987, and was appointed Master of the Supreme Court in 1996.

== Judgments ==
Master Sanderson is well known for his eccentric style of judgment-writing. His decisions are often brief, and make use of humour and literary references. In the case of Murfett Legal Pty Ltd v Frigger [No 2] [2017] WASC 262 the Master opened his judgment by commenting: "This is another step in one of a suite of actions which might properly be called Mr and Mrs Frigger v The World". His judgment in Giumelli v Giumelli & Ors [2003] WASC 259 opened: "This case brings to mind the aphorism which introduces Tolstoy's tragedy Anna Karenina: "All happy families are the same. Each unhappy family is unhappy in its own way"". Evaluating evidence given by a psychic detective, the Master concluded:

The final witness called by the defendant was Gabrielle Therese Crofts. Mrs Crofts is the elder sister of Adrienne McNamara. Mrs Gabrielle Crofts has a number of qualifications and has worked for a number of years in the area of domestic violence. She is also a psychic detective... In the end I determined I would not take her evidence into account in determining this application. Given her psychic powers Mrs Crofts probably anticipated this outcome.

The Master's decision in Bell Group (UK) Holdings Limited (In liquidation) [2020] WASC 347 effectively ended the 'Bell litigation' which had been ongoing for 25 years, the most expensive and longest-running set of civil litigation in the state's history. The decision contains the catchwords 'Ode to a dying corporation', opens with the phrase 'These reasons are not so much a judgment as a requiem', and ends simply 'Amen'. The decision states the Master was tempted to 'drive a wooden stake through the heart of the company to ensure it does not rise zombie-like from the grave' or alternatively order 'the files be removed to a secure facility in Roswell and marked: 'Never to be opened''.

== Stephen McNamara finding ==
In 2013 Master Sanderson was at the forefront of uncovering fraudulent acts by South Australian Barrister Stephen McNamara. In a dispute centring on legal costs, Master Sanderson's judgement opened with the observation: "This looks very much like an attempt by the defendant to extort money from the plaintiff. There may be a more benign explanation for what the defendant has done but it is difficult to see what that might be". He referred the matter to the police in both South Australia and Western Australia. Six years later, McNamara was sentenced to nine years jail after investigations from the matter revealed he had stolen $850,000 from two deceased estates.
