= Carmel McLure =

Australian judge

The Honourable Carmel Joy McLure AC, KC

President of the Court of Appeal of the Supreme Court of Western Australia
- In office 2009; 17 years ago – 2016

Personal details
- Born: c. 1955 Perth, Western Australia
- Occupation: Jurist, barrister

Carmel Joy McLure AC KC is an Australian jurist who previously served as President of the Court of Appeal of the Supreme Court of Western Australia.

== Career ==
McLure was born around 1955 in Perth, Western Australia, and was educated at St Joachim's and the University of Western Australia.

She commenced working for the Australian Attorney-General's Department in 1977 before being articled as a legal clerk in the 1980s. She became a partner in the firm later known as Corrs Chambers Westgarth in 1987 and took silk in 1997, appointed as a Queen's Counsel. McClure was a barrister until her appointment to the bench in 2001, as a judge of the Supreme Court of Western Australia. Appointed a member of the Court of Appeal in 2005, McLure was promoted as President in 2009, the first woman to be appointed to the position. She retired in 2016. Michael Buss was appointed as her successor as President of the Court of Appeal.

In 2016 McLure was appointed Companion of the Order of Australia for eminent service to the law and to the judiciary in Western Australia, to legal administration and professional development, and to the community through contributions to tertiary education and arts organisations.
