= Anthony Harvey (disambiguation) =

Anthony Harvey (1930–2017) was a British filmmaker.

Anthony or Tony Harvey may also refer to:

- Anthony Harvey (footballer) (born 1973), Australian rules footballer
- Anthony Robert Harvey (born 1993), Australian mass-murderer
- Tony Harvey (basketball), American basketball coach
- Adrian Lester (born Anthony Harvey, 1968), British actor

== See also ==
- Tony Hervey (born 1985), American mixed martial artist
