= Christopher Pullin =

Australian judge

Christopher James Lonsdale Pullin is a former judge of the Supreme Court of Western Australia from 10 September 2001.

He served in the court's general division until 2005 when he was appointed as an appeal judge to the newly created Western Australian Court of Appeal.

In 2009, Justice Pullin was appointed to serve also as the President of the Western Australian Industrial Appeal Court.

He retired from the Supreme Court, the Court of Appeal and the Industrial Appeal Court in 2014.

== Early life and career ==
Justice Pullin was born in 1947 in England. His family migrated to Australia in 1948. He attended Kellerberrin Junior High School and Governor Stirling Senior High School before earning a law degree from University of Western Australia in 1969.

He served as the president of both the Western Australian Bar Association from 1992 to 1994, and the Australian Bar Association from 1997 to 1998.

== Life beyond the Court ==
After retiring from the court, Justice Pullin has acted as an arbitrator and mediator. In this role, he has heard numerous resources, gas industry and contractual disputes involving domestic and international arbitrations.

In his spare time, he is an artist and printmaker. He was the president of the Printmakers Association of Western Australia between 2011 and 2014. His drawings have been used to illustrate books.

He has a long time interest in conservation and bush restoration and was at one time Patron of the River Conservation Society (Inc).
