= Corrs Chambers Westgarth =

Australian commercial law firm

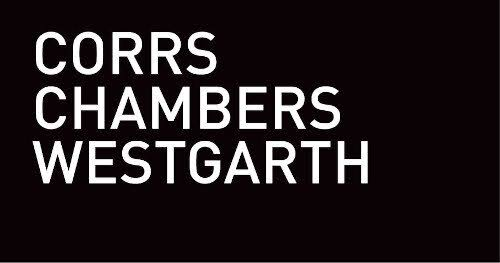
- Headquarters: Quay Quarter Tower; 50 Bridge Street, Sydney, New South Wales, Australia
- No. of offices: 5
- No. of lawyers: 600+
- Major practice areas: Commercial law
- Key people: Gavin MacLaren, Senior Partner and CEO; Stephen Price, Chairman
- Revenue: ▲AUD$561.5 million (2024)
- Date founded: 1841
- Company type: Partnership
- Website: www.corrs.com.au

Corrs Chambers Westgarth (often referred to as Corrs) is an Australian commercial law firm founded in 1841. Corrs has offices in Sydney, Melbourne, Brisbane, Perth and Port Moresby.

Corrs' clients include national and international corporations, governments, banks and financial sponsors.

== History ==
Corrs Chambers Westgarth has its roots in the pre-gold rush days of Melbourne, dating back to when law firm Whiting and Byrne was formed in 1841. In 1883, Norton Smith Westgarth and Sanders was established in Sydney, followed two years later by Brisbane's Chambers McNab and Co.

These three firms are the foundations of Corrs Chambers Westgarth, which was formed in 1991 by the merger of Corrs Australian Solicitors, Westgarth Middletons (Sydney) and Chambers McNab Tully and Wilson (Brisbane and Gold Coast). Corrs Australian Solicitors was formed two years earlier (initially with the name Corrs) via the merger of Corrs Pavey Whiting and Byrne, Adelaide's Mollison Litchfield and Perth's Keall Brinsden (founded in 1910).

== Team ==
Across its offices in Sydney, Melbourne, Brisbane, Perth and Port Moresby, Corrs has a team of more than 1400 employees and over 750 lawyers.

Gavin MacLaren has been the Senior Partner and CEO of Corrs Chambers Westgarth since 2018. He has been recognised as an Innovative Leader in the Financial Times Innovative Lawyers Awards Asia Pacific and as a Band 1 lawyer across multiple jurisdictions in the major legal directories. He previously held senior partnership roles at Freshfields and Allens.

== Significant matters and deals ==
Corrs has advised on a number of high-profile deals and matters including:

- Advised DAZN on its A$3.4 billion acquisition of 100% of Foxtel from Foxtel’s shareholders News Corporation and Telstra
- Advised Stockland Supalai Residential Communities Partnership on its A$1.06 billion acquisition of 12 masterplanned communities from Lendlease
- Advised Saint-Gobain on its strategic acquisition of CSR Limited for A$4.3 billion
- Advised Azure Minerals on its proposed joint acquisition by Sociedad Química y Minera de Chile S.A. and Hancock Prospecting for A$1.70 billion
- Advised Coca-Cola European Partners on its acquisition of Coca-Cola Amatil, valued at A$11.1 billion
- Advised TPG Telecom on all aspects of the ten-year network sharing agreement with Telstra
- Advised Tritium on its A$1.2 billion merger with Decarbonization Plus Acquisition Corporation II and subsequent listing on the Nasdaq
- Advised BGH Capital on the establishment of Australia's largest private equity fund
- Advised Anchorage Capital Partners on the acquisition of iconic Australian department store David Jones
- Advised the Rinehart family's company in relation to multiple claims being brought by two family members and two commercial third parties, worth more than A$10 billion
- Advised Blackstone Alternative Asset Management on its launch of a fund for ANZ's high-net worth clients, targeting A$1 billion
- Advised ACCIONA, COBRA, and Endeavour Energy (ACEREZ) consortium in groundbreaking renewable energy zone project in New South Wales
- Advised the Australian Human Rights Institute on a project to support advancing human rights in the built environment
- Acted pro bono alongside Colin Golvan AM QC for Aboriginal man and artist, Harold Thomas, the owner of the copyright in the Australian Aboriginal flag, on the deal to assign copyright in the Flag to the Commonwealth Government
- Acted pro bono alongside Doughty Street Chambers and the UNSW Australian Human Rights Institute for Mr Noel Zihabamwe, an Australian human rights activist, in relation to the enforced disappearance of his two brothers in Rwanda

== Awards ==
Corrs has received national, regional, and global recognition, having won various accolades and awards:

- Corrs was named in Australasian Lawyer's Best Law Firms in Australia 2024 list
- In 2024, the firm was named as a Leading Legal Advisor for M&A by MergerLinks in its Australia and New Zealand rankings
- Corrs was named Law Firm of the Year – Competition Law in the 2024 Edition of Best Lawyers in Australia
- In 2023, Corrs was named the Most Innovative Law Firm Headquartered in Asia-Pacific by the Financial Times
- In 2022, the firm was named Australian Law Firm of the year by Chambers Asia Pacific & Greater China Region
- The firm was named Law Firm of the Year, 2022 for Corporate Law by Best Lawyers, Australia
- In 2021, the firm was named Law Firm of the Year and Commercial Team of the Year at the Australian Law Awards
- Corrs won the award for innovation in Social Responsibility in the 2017 Financial Times Asia Pacific Innovative Lawyers Awards

== Practice ==
In 2023, Corrs was named the Most Innovative Law Firm Headquartered in Asia-Pacific by the Financial Times. In 2022, the firm was named Australian Law Firm of the year by Chambers Asia Pacific & Greater China Region. That same year the firm was also named Law Firm of the Year, 2022 for Corporate Law by Best Lawyers, Australia. In 2021, the firm was named Law Firm of the Year and Commercial Team of the Year at the Australian Law Awards.

Corrs is recognised for its depth of expertise across sectors including:

- Energy & Resources
- Technology, Media & Telecommunications
- Financial Services
- Investment Funds & Private Equity
- Life Sciences
- Consumer & Retail
- Transport & Logistics
- Real Estate
- Construction & Infrastructure
- Food & Agribusiness
- Government
- Health & Aged Care
- Industrials & Manufacturing

== Notable employees ==
The following list includes people who have worked or consulted for Corrs Chambers Westgarth:

- Michael Barker, former Federal Court judge of Australia.
- Andrew Bassat, CEO and co-founder of SEEK.
- Liz Ellis, former captain of the Australian national netball team.
- Kim Hargrave, Supreme Court judge of Victoria.
- Joe Hockey, Australia's former ambassador to the United States of America (2016-2020), and former treasurer of Australia (2013-2015).
- Michael Lee, Federal Court judge, and former director of the Bell Shakespeare Company.
- Derek Volker, retired senior Australian public servant
- Allan Myers, Australian QC (current), chancellor of Melbourne University, and currently ranked on the Australian Financial Review Rich List.
- Geoff Raby, former ambassador to China.
- Justice Iain Ros, president of the Fair Work Commission, and Federal Court judge of Australia.
- John Storey, former chancellor of the University of Queensland, former chairman of Suncorp and Tabcorp.
- Bernard Teague, former Supreme Court judge of Victoria
