= Cheryl Kickett-Tucker =

Australian professor, author and Indigenous leader

Cheryl Kickett-Tucker AM FAHA (born c. 1967 or 1968) is an Australian professor, author and renowned Indigenous leader. She is also a former basketball player.

She is a research fellow at Curtin University in Western Australia, in the fields of Australian Aboriginal identity and self-esteem. She is involved in several Aboriginal community development programs, primarily for younger people.

== Early life ==
Kickett-Tucker was born in the Perth suburb of Subiaco, the fifth of eight children, and spent her early childhood years in Lockridge. Her parents divorced when she was ten years old, and she moved with her mother and siblings to Midland.

She attended Governor Stirling Senior High School. She began playing basketball at the Midland Police Citizens Youth Club, then competed at high school.

== Academic qualifications and career ==
Kickett-Tucker graduated from Edith Cowan University with a Bachelor of Applied Science in 1991, then moved to the US where she completed a Master of Science at the University of Oregon in 1993.

In 2000 she received a PhD from Edith Cowan University, (Note: The first Aboriginal person to do so.) with the thesis Urban Aboriginal Children in Sport: Experiences, Perceptions and Sense of Self.

She has worked as a lecturer and researcher at Edith Cowan University and Murdoch University, as well as holding adjunct or associate professorial roles at Notre Dame University, the University of Western Australia and the Australian Catholic University.

She is currently a research fellow at Curtin University, in the fields of Australian Aboriginal identity and self-esteem, particularly among Aboriginal children and young adults.

In 2016 she co-authored and edited the tertiary education text book Mia Mia Aboriginal Community Development: Fostering cultural security.

She has also written several children's books, some using both English and Noongar language. Her books include Ninni Yabini, Lucky Thamu, Barlay, and co-authored books such as Bush and beyond.

== Basketball career ==
Kickett-Tucker was a member of the WAIS Rockets in 1987 when the team won the Women's Basketball Conference. The team had no home games, having to play in Victoria, New South Wales, Tasmania and South Australia. Players had to sacrifice work and study; Kickett-Tucker was threatened with being kicked out of university due to her lack of attendance.

She played in the State Basketball League for numerous teams:

- Perry Lakes 1989, 24g, 269pt @ 11.2
- Swan Districts 1990–1991, 40g, 566pt @ 14.2
- Swan Districts 1993–1994, 24g, 232pt @ 9.7
- Perth 1998–1999, 20g, 89pt @ 4.5

== Community work ==
Kickett-Tucker is a director of Koya Aboriginal Corporation, a non-profit community organisation started in 2005 by her father, Allan Kickett.

In 2008, she created Pindi Pindi, a community research centre for Aboriginal well-being.

In 2015 she started Kaat, Koort (Note: Noongar for "head, heart".) 'n' Hoops, a basketball program for children, which has subsequently expanded to other sports. It was originally started for Aboriginal children, but now also accepts non-Aboriginal people.

She is an honorary research fellow for the Telethon Kids Institute, and consultant for the Australian Indigenous HealthInfoNet.

She was a member of the co-design group for the Indigenous Voice to Parliament, and in May 2021 co-facilitated a community consultation in Broome, Western Australia, that included students from the local high school.

== Awards and honours ==
Kickett-Tucker has received numerous awards and honours, the more notable being:

- 2001, National NAIDOC Scholar of the Year
- 2019, Western Australian Local Hero
- 2020, Member of the Order of Australia, "For significant service to tertiary education, and to the Indigenous community"
- 2025, Elected a Fellow of the Australian Academy of the Humanities in 2025

== Personal life ==
Kickett-Tucker is a Wadjuk Noongar woman, with Ballardong and Yued ancestry through her grandparents.

She is married, with three children, and is a keen amateur photographer.

She is related to footballers Dale Kickett and Derek Kickett.
