= Gail Archer =

Australian judge

Hon. Justice Gail Ann Archer SC
- Education: University of Western Australia
- Occupation: Judge
- Spouse: Patrick O'Neal

Hon. Justice Gail Ann Archer SC is a judge of the Court of Appeal of Western Australia.

Archer's father died when she was 17. She graduated in jurisprudence and law from the University of Western Australia in 1988, and commenced her legal career at the West Australian Crown Solicitor's Office in 1989, before joining the West Australian Office of the Director of Public Prosecutions (DPP) in 1993, remaining there until 2002. During her time at the DPP she conducted over 150 jury trials and represented the state in numerous matters in the Court of Appeal. After her work at the DPP, she joined Legal Aid WA from 2002 to 2004 as principal counsel, before practicing as a barrister at Francis Burt Chambers. She was appointed senior counsel at chambers in 2007. She joined the Independent Bar in 2004, and sat as a Commissioner in the District Court for periods in 2005 and 2006.

After completing a legislative review of the CCC Act, Archer was appointed as Acting Commissioner of the West Australian Corruption and Crime Commission in April 2008, and resigned in February 2011. During this time she taught forensic advocacy nationally and internationally, and was a coach in the Australian Bar Association's advanced advocacy course. Archer was appointed a judge of the Supreme Court of Western Australia on 29 May 2017 after the resignation of the Hon. Justice David Newnes from 21 April 2017.
