= Michael Barker (judge) =

Australian judge

Michael Laurence Barker KC is a former Australian judge who served as a Judge of the Federal Court of Australia from 9 February 2009 to 11 February 2019. He previously served as a Judge of the Supreme Court of Western Australia and as President of the Western Australian State Administrative Tribunal.

Barker studied at the University of Western Australia and was admitted to practice in 1973. He practiced in Perth for several years, before undertaking postgraduate study at York University in Canada. He returned to Australia in 1981, and was a member of the faculty of law at the Australian National University in Canberra from 1981 to 1985. Barker returned to practice in Perth in 1986. While a practicing barrister, he served a term as counsel assisting the WA Inc Royal Commission in 1991-1992, and spent four years as Chairman of the Western Australian Town Planning Appeals Tribunal from 1990 to 1994. He was appointed as a Queens Counsel in 1996.

Barker was appointed to the Supreme Court of Western Australia in 2002, replacing retired judge Henry Wallwork, and was further appointed to head the State Administrative Tribunal in 2004. He was appointed to the Federal Court in February 2009, following the appointment of veteran Perth-based judge Robert French as Chief Justice of the High Court.

Barker retired as a judge of the Federal Court on 10 February 2019. He is now an associate member of Murray Chambers, Barristers, Perth, Western Australia and acts as a mediator and consultant. He is now also the writer and editor of Fremantle Shipping News.
