= St. George's Grammar School (Cape Town) =

Private school in Mowbray, South Africa

St George's Grammar School
- St George's Grammar School crest

Location
- Richmond Road, Mowbray; Cape Town, Western Cape, 7700; South Africa; 33°56′47″S 18°28′50″E

Information
- School type: Private
- Motto: Latin: Virtute et Valore (By virtue and valour (The Courage To Do What Is Right))
- Religious affiliation: Christianity
- Denomination: Anglican
- Patron saint: St. George
- Established: 11 April 1848; 178 years ago
- Founder: Bishop Robert Gray
- School district: Metro Central
- Oversight: Anglican Diocese of Cape Town
- Headmaster: Mr Julian Cameron
- Staff: 87 full-time
- Grades: R to 12
- Gender: Boys & Girls
- Enrollment: 407
- Average class size: 25
- Education system: NSC
- Language: English
- Campus type: Suburban
- Houses: Tugman, Pinchin & Shaw
- Colours: Black; Gold; White
- Affiliation: Anglican Diocese, ISASA
- Website: www.sggs.co.za

St. George's Grammar School is a private co-educational day school located in Mowbray, a suburb of Cape Town, South Africa.

It was historically the cathedral school attached to St. George's Cathedral, having been founded in 1848 by Robert Gray, the first Anglican Bishop of Cape Town. St. George's claims to be the oldest independent school in South Africa.

== Notable staff ==
- Barry Smith

== Notable alumni ==
- William Carlsson (1892–1916), was a first-class cricketer
- Michael Brimer (OG 1947) (born 8 August 1933) was a pianist, organist, conductor, composer, musicologist, and academic.
- Jack Plimsoll (OG 1935), was a South African cricketer who played in one Test in 1947, against England in Manchester.
- Roy Clare (OG 1966), Royal Navy admiral
- Sir Nigel Hawthorne, was an English actor
- Christopher Steytler (OG 1966), former judge of the Supreme Court of Western Australia and President of the Court of appeal
- Nicholas Pike (OG 1973), a Hollywood composer in film and television
- Rick Turner (OG 1959) (25 September 1941, in Stellenbosch – 8 January 1978, in Durban), was a South African academic and anti-apartheid activist who was probably assassinated by the apartheid state in 1978. Nelson Mandela described Turner "as a source of inspiration".
- Clive Scott (OG 1955) (4 July 1937 – 28 July 2021) was a South African radio, film, television and theatre actor and director best known for his performances in the TV soap operas, The Villagers and Isidingo.
- William Rune Liltved (OG 1979), (born 1960) is a South African malacologist and botanist.
- Zohran Mamdani (OG 1998), Ugandan-born American politician and Mayor of New York City.
