= Andrew Beech =

Justice with the Supreme Court of Western Australia

The Honourable Andrew Robert Beech

Justice of the Supreme Court of Western Australia
- Incumbent
- Assumed office 2017

Personal details
- Born: April 17, 1962 (age 63) Western Australia, Australia
- Education: University of Western Australia (BJuris, LLB); Magdalen College, Oxford (BCL)
- Occupation: Judge

Andrew Robert Beech (born 17 April 1962) is a justice with the Supreme Court of Western Australia. He is a graduate of the Bachelor of Civil Law program at Magdalen College at the University of Oxford. While studying at Oxford, he made four appearances in first-class cricket for Oxford University Cricket Club in 1987.

== Early life and education ==
Beech was born in Western Australia on 17 April 1962 and was educated at St Louis School and John XXIII College. He studied law at the University of Western Australia, where he received a Bachelor of Jurisprudence in 1983 and a Bachelor of Laws with first class honours in 1984. He was admitted to legal practice in Western Australia on 20 December 1985.

== Career ==
Beech completed his articles and period of restricted practice with the law firm Northmore Hale (later part of Minter Ellison) between 1985 and 1986. After further legal study in England, where he obtained a Bachelor of Civil Law from the University of Oxford, Beech returned to Western Australia and worked in commercial litigation at Parker & Parker (later Freehills) from 1989 to 1991. From 1992 to 1994 he served as a Crown Prosecutor in the Office of the Director of Public Prosecutions in Western Australia. In 1994 he joined the independent Bar, developing a practice that encompassed commercial and general civil litigation as well as public and criminal law.

Alongside his legal practice, Beech has been involved in legal education. Since 1989, he has served as a part-time lecturer at the University of Western Australia Law School, teaching undergraduate law and contributing to advocacy training in the state. He has participated in numerous advocacy workshops organised by the Law Society of Western Australia and the Australian Advocacy Institute, and contributed to the development of advocacy training programs. He was a member of the committee chaired by Justice John Steytler that developed the Trial Advocacy course jointly presented in 2002 by the Supreme Court of Western Australia and Murdoch University Law School. He has also served as a workshop leader in the advocacy component of the Bar Readers’ Course.

Beech has also been involved in legal publishing. He served as a reporter for the Western Australian Reports (WAR) from 1989 to 1996 and as its editor from 1996 to 2002. Since 2002, he has served as the consultant editor for the reports.

On 24 May 2017, Justice Beech was appointed to the Court of Appeal.
