= Robert Mazza =

Australian judge

The Honourable Justice Robert Anthony Mazza

Justice of Appeal of the Supreme Court of Western Australia (Court of Appeal)
- Incumbent
- Assumed office 16 December 2011

Judge of the Supreme Court of Western Australia (General Division)
- In office 8 March 2010 – 15 December 2011

Judge of the District Court of Western Australia
- In office 10 Feb 2004 – 7 March 2010

Robert Mazza is a judge of the Court of Appeal of the Supreme Court of Western Australia and former judge of the District Court of Western Australia. Before his appointment he founded his own law firm. He is a graduate of the University of Western Australia.
