= St Georges Hall, Perth =

Former theatre and cinema in Perth, Western Australia

St Georges Hall
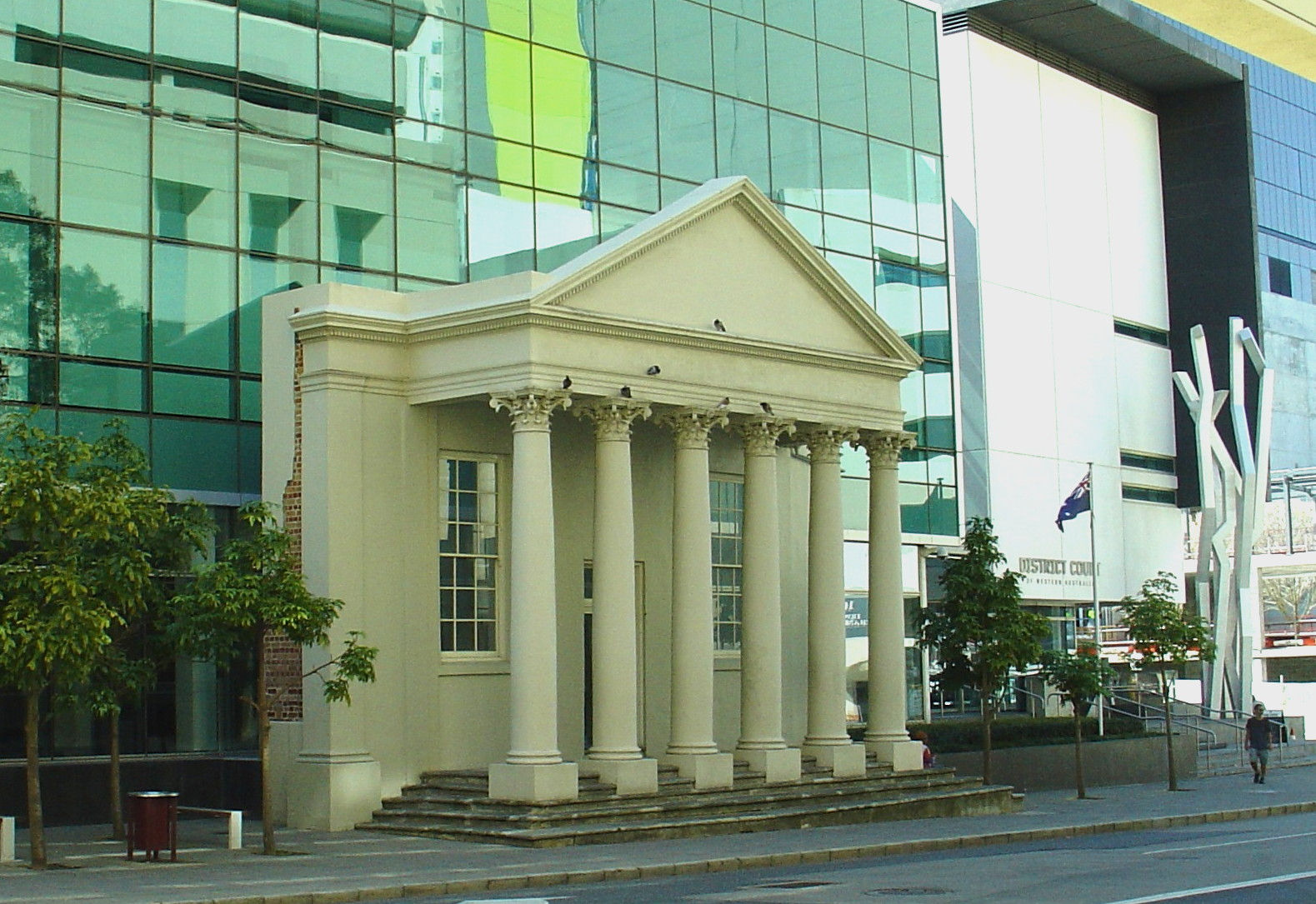
- St George's Hall portico fronting Perth's 2008 District Court building
- Interactive map of the St Georges Hall area
- Alternative names: St Georges Theatre

General information
- Status: Partially demolished
- Type: Theatre
- Architectural style: Grecian
- Location: 508 Hay Street, Perth, Australia
- Coordinates: 31°57′19″S 115°51′48″E
- Inaugurated: 4 December 1879

Western Australia Heritage Register
- Type: State Registered Place
- Designated: 26 November 2019
- Reference no.: 1985

St Georges Hall was a theatre building in Perth, Western Australia.

== Construction ==
The hall was constructed in 1879 and was the first dedicated theatre building in Perth.

== Demolition ==
The building was demolished in the 1980s with the portico retained. In 2008 the District Court Building was constructed behind the portico.
