= William Carlsson =

South African cricketer and South African Army soldier

Personal information
- Full name: William Eric Carlsson
- Born: January 1892; Hoetjies Bay, Cape Colony, South Africa
- Died: 14 July 1916 (aged 24); Longueval, Somme, France

Domestic team information
- Years: Team
- 1910/11: Western Province

Career statistics
Competition	First-class
Matches	4
Runs scored	44
Batting average	6.28
100s/50s	0/0
Top score	24
Catches/stumpings	4/–
- Source: CricketArchive, 1 April 2021

Rugby union career
- Position(s): Wing, Centre
Amateur team(s)
Years	Team	Apps	(Points)
1914	Villagers RFC		
Provincial / State sides
Years	Team	Apps	(Points)
1914	Western Province		(0)

William Eric Carlsson (January 1892 – 14 July 1916) was a South African first-class cricket, rugby union player and a soldier in the South African Army.

Carlsson was born at Hoetjies Bay in January 1892. He was educated at both the Diocesan College and St George's Grammar School. Carlsson played first-class cricket for Western Province in the 1910–11 Currie Cup, making four appearances against Eastern Province, Border, Natal, and Griqualand West. He scored 44 runs in his four matches, with a highest score of 24.

Carlsson played club rugby for Villagers RFC and provincial rugby for Western Province, making his debut in 1914. He was a member of the Western Province team that won the Currie Cup in 1914, by winning all nine of their matches in the competition.

Carlsson served in the South African Army during the First World War as a private in the 1st Infantry Brigade, which travelled to Europe as part of the South African Overseas Expeditionary Force. He saw action on the Western Front, where he fought in the Battle of the Somme in July 1916. He was killed in action at Delville Wood on 14 July. He is commemorated at the Thiepval Memorial.
