= William Rune Liltved =

William Rune Liltved (born 1960) is a South African malacologist and botanist.

Liltved completed high school 1979 at St George's Grammar School and was employed by South African Museum, Cape Town. He studied marine molluscs at California Academy of Sciences in San Francisco. His career has taken him to study molluscs in tropical South Pacific, New Zealand, Australia, the Caribbean and Mediterranean sea, Californian west coast and gulf of California, Gough Island and Tristan da Cunha, and extensively off southern Africa.

The standard author abbreviation Liltved is used to indicate this person as the author when citing a botanical name.

== Publications ==
- Gosliner, Terence M.; Liltved, William R. (1985). "Aspects of the morphology of the endemic South African Cypraeidae with a discussion of the evolution of the Cypraeacea and Lamellariacea". Annals of the South African Museum. Annale van die Suid-Afrikaanse Museum. 96: 67–122.
- Roeleveld, Martina A.; Liltved, W. R. (1985). "A new species of Sepia (Cephalopoda, Sepeiidae) from South Africa". Annals of the South African Museum. Annale van die Suid-Afrikaanse Museum. 96: 1–18.
