= Governor Stirling Senior High School =

School in Woodbridge, Perth, Western Australia,

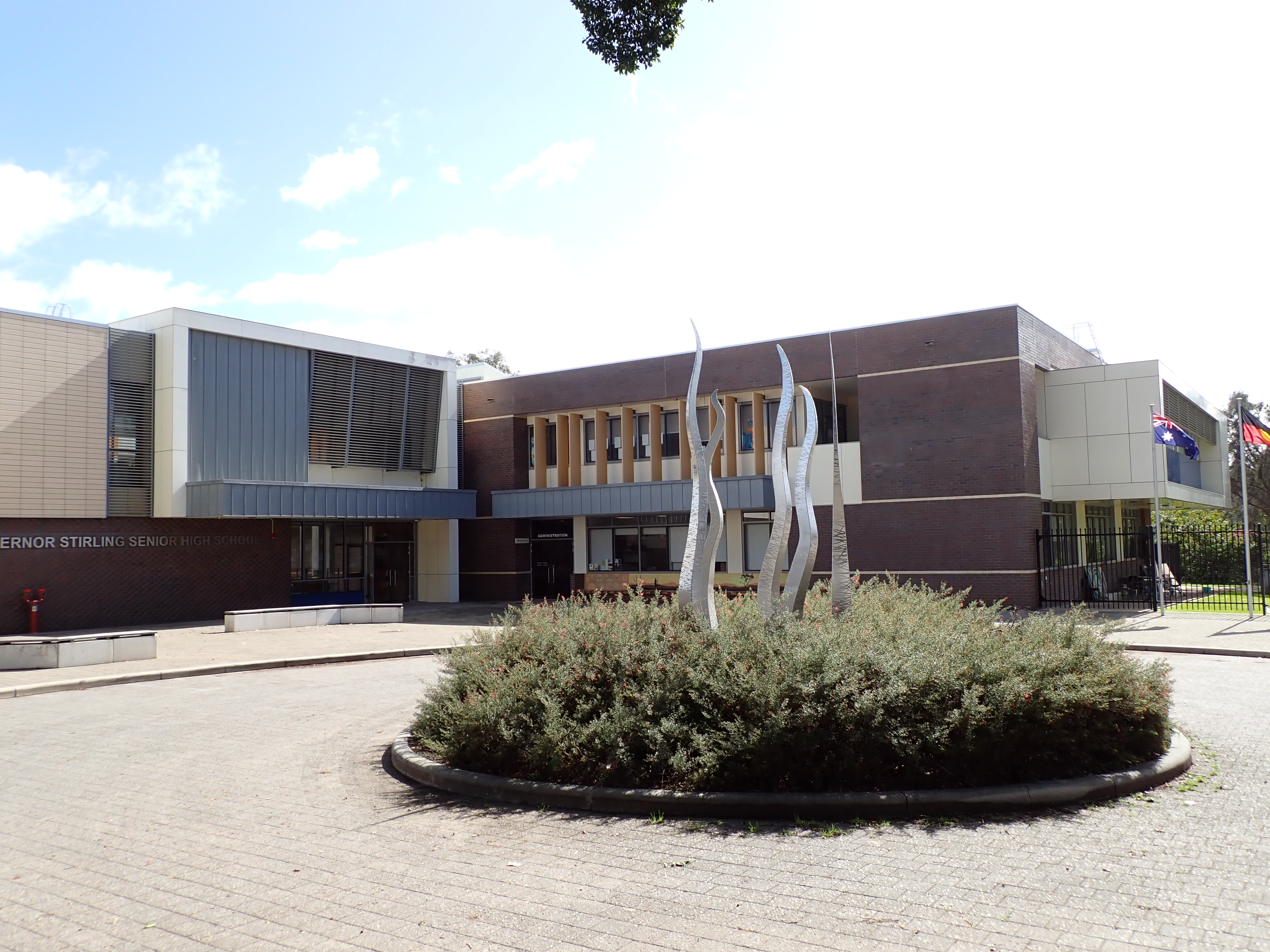
- View of the school from Third Avenue

Location
- Woodbridge, Perth, Western Australia, Western Australia; Australia; 31°53′19″S 115°59′20″E

Information
- Type: Public co-educational partially selective high day school
- Motto: Imagine, Create, Achieve
- Established: 28 October 1959; 66 years ago
- School district: North Metropolitan Education Region
- Educational authority: WA Department of Education
- Principal: Leo Surjan
- Enrolment: 1,150 (2017)
- Campus type: Suburban
- Colours: Navy blue and yellow
- Website: www.govo.wa.edu.au

Governor Stirling Senior High School (abbreviated as GSSHS / Govo) is a public co-educational partially selective high day school, located in Woodbridge, a north-eastern suburb of Perth, Western Australia. The school provides both a vocational and tertiary entrance education for students from Year 7 to Year 12.

Opened in 1959, the school replaced the former Midland Junction High School (MJHS) founded in 1901, at a new site in West Midland.

== History ==
The school was officially opened on 28 October 1959 by then Western Australian Minister for Education, Arthur Watts. On that day its name was officially changed from Midland Junction High School to Governor Stirling Senior High School, named after James Stirling. This day also saw the adoption of a new school crest, which retained the motto of MJHS: "Honour Before Honours". The official crest features a white swan behind a shield.

In 1964, Woodbridge House became an annexe for GSSHS. Around thirty students were involved in the High School Certificate courses, and the house provided a non-institutional learning environment for the small student community. Students were able to recover the wind vane missing from the house, which was discovered in the mud of the river bed. During this same period Woodbridge House became the headquarters for the Midland District Youth Committee, an advisory body representing up to thirteen local youth organisations.

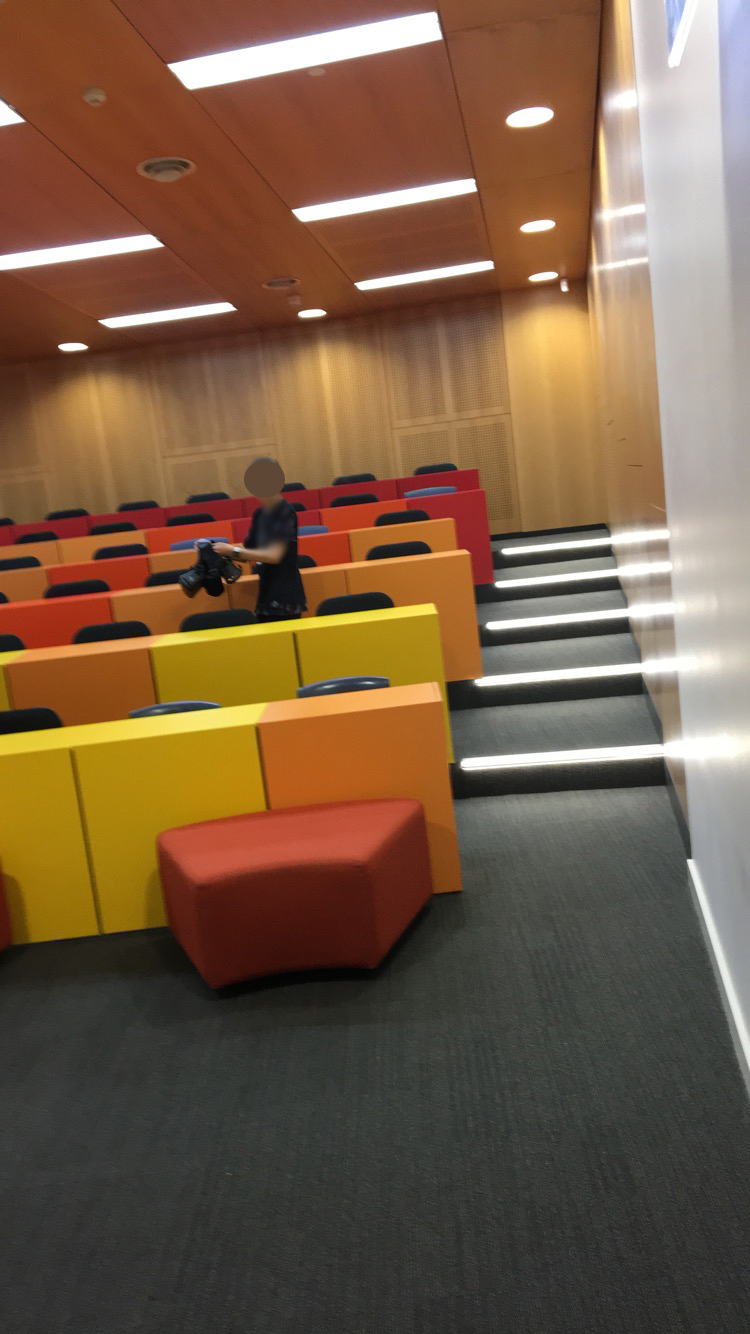
Lecture theatre at the new campus

== Redevelopment plans ==
On 8 May 2008, then federal Education Minister Julia Gillard formally granted $63 million to re-build the school on the current site. The school was rebuilt and equipped with newer facilities. The Maali Centre is a dedicated building for Indigenous student support services. Donaldson + Warn Architects were commissioned to design the new school campus, and construction began in February 2011. In the interim Years 8, 9, 10 attended the old Midland Primary School site and Years 11 and 12 attended Cyril Jackson Senior Campus. The new campus was completed for Term 1 in the 2013 school year.

== Specialist programs ==
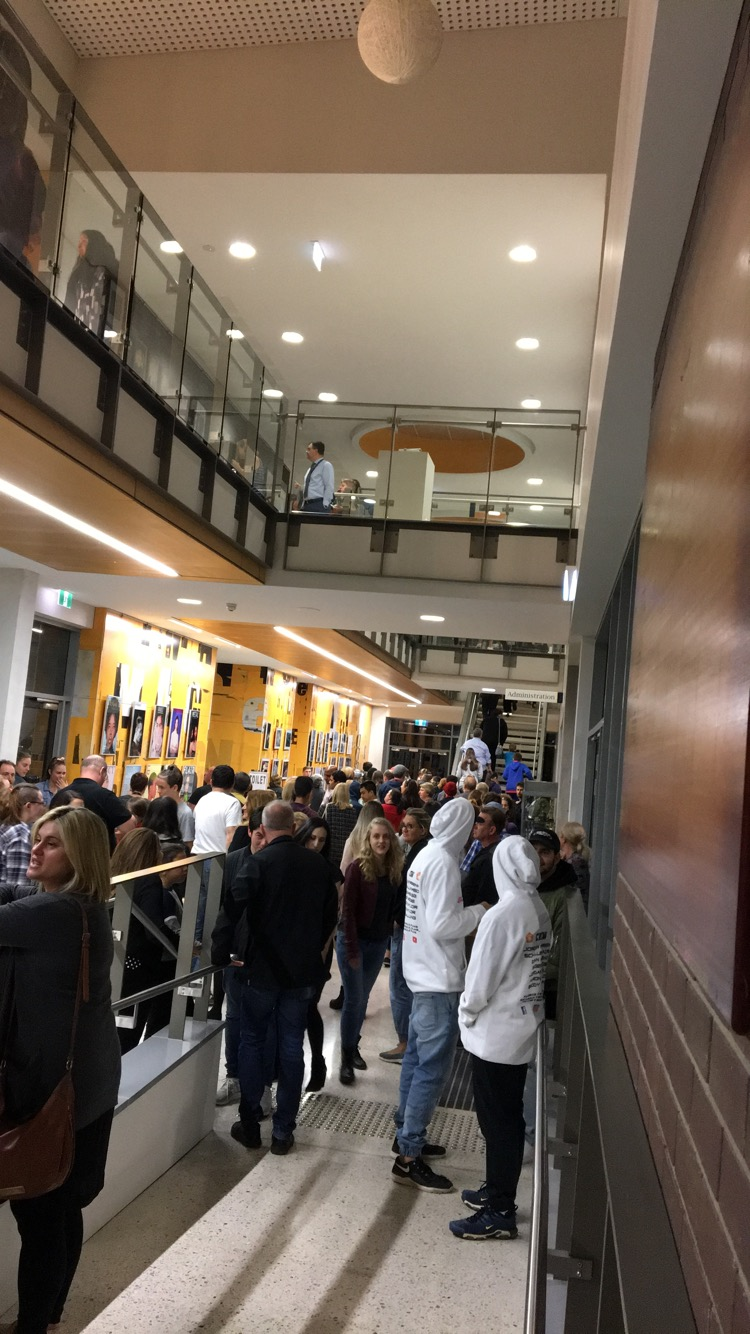
Main exhibition in the visual and performing arts hall at the GSSHS Artsmedia Exhibition in 2017

GSSHS offers three specialist programs; Artsmedia, Engineering and Football. All three programs are selective, and of these programs Artsmedia and Engineering are academically selective. As well as the specialist programs, the school also offers an approved Gifted and Talented GATE extension program. The school also offers other non-specialist programs such as netball and music.

=== Artsmedia ===
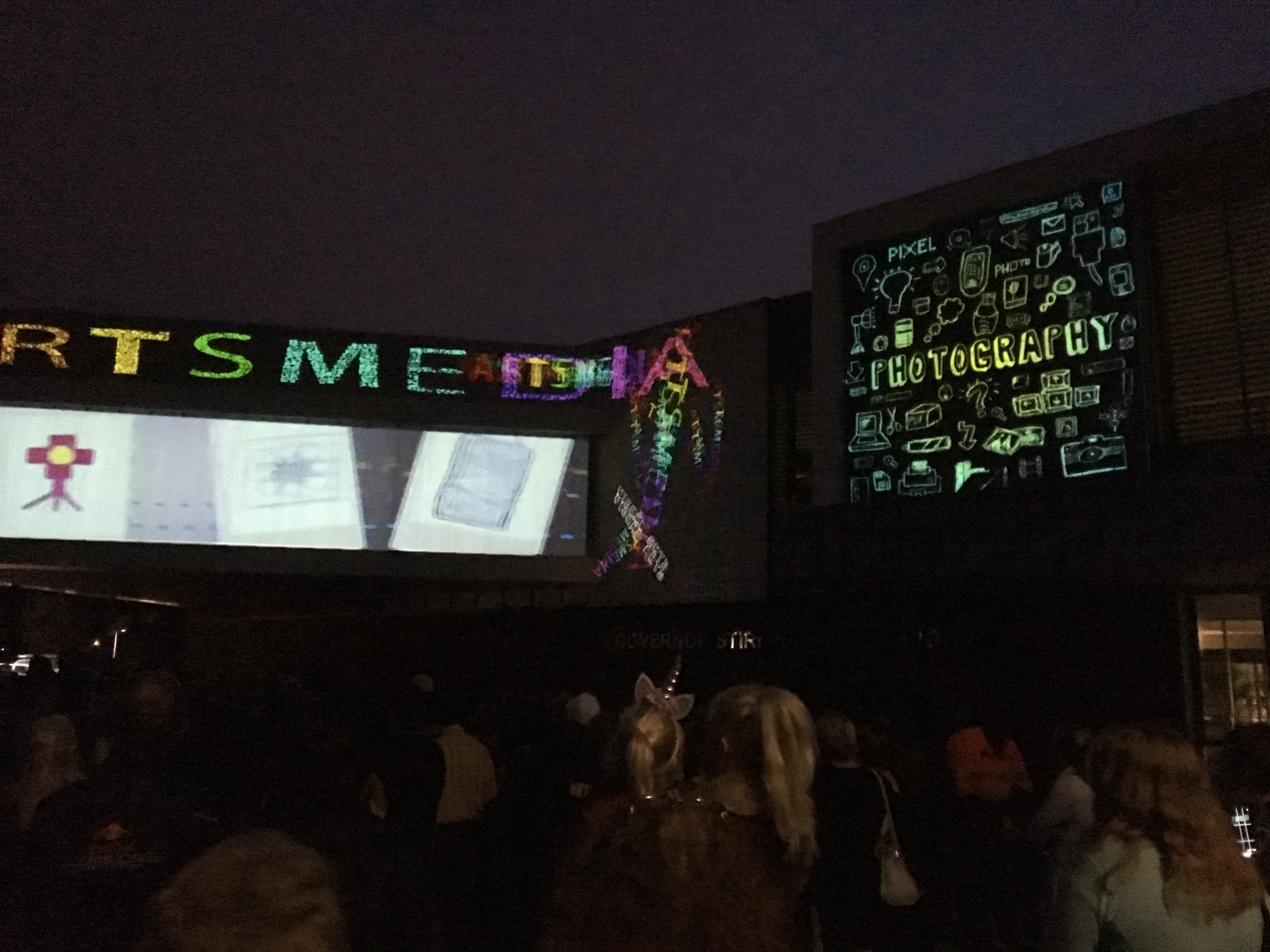
Artsmedia Exhibition 2017 featuring projection onto the administration building

Artsmedia is a specialist academic program targeted at developing skills within Art and Media including visual arts, digital and game design, film and television, journalism and photojournalism. The program is delivered in partnership with Murdoch University, providing opportunities for direct university entry. The program operates from years 7–10 and students have classes for four hours each week. Students can continue studying aspects of the program in years 11 and 12 in the form of VET subjects.

=== Engineering ===
The school offers a specialist engineering program. The program focuses on a diverse range of engineering studies including electrical, mechanical, chemical, environmental and civil engineering. The program is delivered in partnership with the University of Western Australia.

=== Football ===
GSSHS offers a specialist Australian rules football program.

== Transport ==
GSSHS is accessible by public transport. The nearest railway station is Woodbridge on the Midland Line, which runs between Perth and Midland stations. There are also Transperth bus stops located ~20m from the school which provide School Special buses 754, 745, 291 & 310.

== Colonial era relics ==
Remnants of the colonial era remain on what is now GSSHS site. Mature Olive trees growing on the high bank overlooking the Swan River are believed to have originated in the colonial period. The school stands on the site of a small cottage built by James Stirling during the Swan River Colony's infancy.

In 1930, an obelisk was erected by the Royal Western Australian Historical Society. The obelisk stands on the river bank adjacent to the then school gymnasium and reads:

Captain James Stirling, R.N., First Governor, Commander-in-Chief, and Vice Admiral of Western Australia from 1829–1839 erected a 'Cottage Orne' here prior to 21 July 1831.

== Notable alumni ==
- Sunday Aryang – Super Netball League (West Coast Fever) Netballer
- Lisa Baker MLA – Member of the Western Australian Legislative Assembly from 2008 and Deputy Speaker since 2017
- Nathan Broad – WAFL (Swan Districts) and AFL (Richmond) Footballer
- Kim Hagdorn – Western Australian Cricketer and Sports Journalist
- Don Holmes – WAFL (Swan Districts) and AFL (West Coast Eagles) Footballer
- Zak Kirkup – State member for Dawesville from 2017 to 2021 and Leader of Western Australian Liberal Party from 2020 to 2021
- Kate Lamont – cook, entrepreneur and author
- Bob McMullan – Senator for the ACT, and Member of the House of Representatives
- Nic Naitanui – WAFL (Swan Districts) and AFL (West Coast Eagles) Footballer
- Bob Pearce – Member of the Western Australian Legislative Assembly from 1977 to 1993
- Christopher Pullin – Justice of the Court of Appeal Western Australia, Justice of the Supreme Court of Western Australia
- Ljiljanna Ravlich MLA – Member of the Western Australian Legislative Council from 1997 to 2015
- Mike Richardson – WAFL (Swan Districts and West Perth) and AFL (Collingwood, Essendon and Brisbane) Footballer
- Stephen Richardson – WAFL (Swan Districts and East Perth) and AFL (Essendon) Footballer
- Nigel Satterley, property developer
- Michael Walters – WAFL (Swan Districts) and AFL (Fremantle) Footballer
- Peter Worthingon – Western Australian Cricketer
- John Yovich – Medical Director Pivot and Adjunct Professor Curtin University
- Professor Cheryl Kickett-Tucker – research fellow at Curtin University involved with Aboriginal community development programs

Midland Junction High School (antecedent of Governor Stirling Senior High School):

- Digby Blight OA – Director General Department of the Premier and Cabinet and Public Sector Standards Commissioner

== See also ==
- List of schools in the Perth metropolitan area
