= Anthony Robert Harvey =

Australian serial killer

- Born: 1993 (age 32–33)
- Employer: Jim's Mowing
- Known for: Familicide
- Spouse: Mara Lee Harvey (dec.)
- Children: 3
- Status: Incarcerated
- Conviction: Murder x5
- Penalty: Life imprisonment without parole

Details
- Victims: 5
- Span of crimes: 2018–2018
- Country: Australia
- State: Western Australia
- Location: Bedford
- Weapons: Knife, length of pipe
- Date apprehended: 9 September 2018 at Pannawonica
- Imprisoned at: Hakea Prison

Anthony Robert Harvey (born 1993) is an Australian mass-murderer convicted of the murder of five immediate family members at Bedford, Western Australia in 2018. The murder event is commonly referred to as the Bedford family massacre, which was an act of family annihilation.

Harvey pleaded guilty in the Supreme Court of Western Australia to five counts of murder and was sentenced by Justice Stephen Hall to five concurrent terms of life without the possibility of parole; the first such order in Western Australian legal history.

== Life ==
Anthony Harvey was married to Mara Lee (née Quinn) Harvey (born 1976) and they had three daughters together: Charlotte Kate (born 2015) and twins Alice Ester and Beatrix Mae (born 2016). Anthony and Mara worked on a fly-in fly-out arrangement at Channar mine before marrying.

At the time of the murders, Anthony and Mara lived at Coode Street, Bedford, a suburb 6 kilometers from the Perth central business district. Anthony operated a Jim's Lawn Mowing franchise and Mara worked at Coles Supermarkets.

== Bedford massacre ==
On the night of 3 September 2018, Mara Harvey returned from her usual night shift and was hit over the head with a length of pipe as she exited the car shed, Anthony Harvey thereafter stabbed her multiple times on the lawn at the back of the house, he then carried her inside laying her on the bed. Anthony Harvey then stabbed each of his three daughters to death, in their beds as they slept. He stabbed the twins in their eyes and stabbed Charlotte 38 times.

During the next morning, on 4 September, Mara Harvey's mother, Beverley Quinn, arrived at the Coode Street residence which was a usual arrangement to assist Mara and Anthony with the children. After entering the house, she was hit over the head with a length of pipe and stabbed to death in the kitchen.

Anthony Harvey stayed at the property for a number of days; before leaving he covered the bodies with a duvet and flowers as well as notes saying he was sorry and loved them as well as left the television on. He thereafter travelled to the remote Pilbara town of Pannawonica where he confessed his crimes to his father, stating "I've done something really wrong Dad. I hurt them all of them". Harvey's father immediately called the Police and arranged for his son to hand himself in to the towns police station on 9 September 2018.

=== Sentencing ===
Harvey pleaded guilty in the Supreme Court of Western Australia to five counts of murder and was sentenced by Justice Stephen Hall to five concurrent terms of life without the possibility of parole, the first non-release order in West-Australian history.

During sentencing, Justice Hall described the murders as "[Harvey's] actions are so far beyond the bounds of acceptable human conduct that they instil horror and revulsion into even the most hardened of people. The murder of children is conduct that is held by society to be especially heinous" and "it is necessary to make an order that you never be released in order to meet the community's interest in punishment and deterrence."

Harvey applied and later abandoned his attempt to appeal the sentence in 2020. He is imprisoned in maximum security at Casuarina Prison.

=== Victims ===
#	Victim	Age	Relationship	Charge	Sentence
1	Mara Lee Harvey	41	Wife	Murder	Life imprisonment without parole
2	Charlotte Kate Harvey	3	Daughter	Murder	Life imprisonment without parole
3	Alice Ester Harvey	2	Daughter	Murder	Life imprisonment without parole
4	Beatrix Mae Harvey	2	Daughter	Murder	Life imprisonment without parole
5	Beverley Ann Quinn	73	Mother-in-law	Murder	Life imprisonment without parole
