= Graeme Murphy (judge) =

Australian judge

Graeme Murphy is an Appeals judge with the Supreme Court of Western Australia. Before his appointment he was a partner with the national firm Blake Dawson Waldron.
