= Janine Pritchard =

Australian judge

The Honourable Justice Janine Pritchard

Judge of the Supreme Court of Western Australia
- Incumbent
- Assumed office 11 June 2010

Personal details
- Education: Australian National University; University of London
- Occupation: Judge, barrister

Janine Pritchard is a justice of the Supreme Court of Western Australia. She is an alumna of both Australian National University and the University of London.

== Controversy ==
In 2013, Justice Pritchard dismissed a West Australian Stolen Generations compensation claim.

This was after the official apology on 13 February 2008 by the then Prime Minister Kevin Rudd to Australia's Indigenous people's on behalf of the Australian government, when he said:

We apologise for the laws and policies of successive Parliaments and governments that have inflicted profound grief, suffering and loss on these our fellow Australians…For the pain, suffering and hurt of these Stolen Generations, their descendants and for their families left behind, we say sorry.

It was also after Australia had legislated in 2002 to make genocide a crime in Australia under the UN Convention on the Prevention and Punishment of the Crime of Genocide which includes the definition "forcibly transferring children of the group to another group".

Justice Pritchard said in her 410-page judgement dismissing the case, while she felt for the family, its case was not established:

The application of the applicable legal principles to the facts established on the balance of probabilities by the evidence leads to the conclusion that the state was not, and is not, subject to the fiduciary duties alleged by the plaintiffs. Even if the state was subject to those duties, the plaintiffs did not establish that the state breached those duties, other than in relation to a decision which was made in November 1959 not to return Ellen to Don and Sylvia's care. Furthermore, the plaintiffs have no right of action against the state because they did not comply with the requirements of the Crown Suits Act.
