= Kenneth Martin (judge) =

Australian judge

Kenneth Martin is a former judge of the Supreme Court of Western Australia and a former editor of the West Australian Law Reports.
