= Paul Tottle =

Western Australian Supreme Court justice

Paul Tottle (born January 1958) is a justice on the Supreme Court of Western Australia as of August 2015. Prior to this, Tottle founded the commercial law firm Tottle Partners in 1995.
