= Jennifer Smith (judge) =

Australian judge

Justice Jennifer Hilda Smith is an Australian jurist who has served on the Supreme Court of Western Australia since 2017. She was appointed as a full-time judge in June 2018 and, following her mandatory retirement in June 2024, continues to serve as an Auxiliary Judge.

== Legal career ==
Smith began her legal career at the Crown Solicitor’s Office in 1985. She was appointed Senior Assistant Crown Counsel in 1997, providing legal advice and representation in various areas, including criminal law, administrative law, and industrial relations. In 2000, Smith was appointed as a Commissioner of the Western Australian Industrial Relations Commission, later becoming its Senior Commissioner in 2006 and Acting President in 2009, the first woman to hold that role.

Smith was appointed as an acting judge of the Supreme Court of Western Australia in August 2017 and became a permanent judge in June 2018. During her tenure, she presided primarily over complex civil matters, including significant commercial disputes. Upon reaching the statutory retirement age in 2024, she was appointed as an Auxiliary Judge to continue contributing to both trial and appellate matters. Her judicial career has been marked by a commitment to procedural fairness, judicial independence, and the advancement of women within the legal profession.

=== Notable cases ===
In 2022, Justice Smith sentenced Luke Fawcett to life imprisonment with a 34-year non-parole period for the murders of his neighbour, Marie Collins, and her brother, Wayne Johnson, in Victoria Park, Perth. The case involved a premeditated attack, with Fawcett having recorded a rehearsal video prior to the killings. Justice Smith described the crimes as “sustained, brutal and merciless,” imposing one of the longest minimum terms in Western Australia’s history.

Justice Smith has presided over proceedings in Wright Prospecting Pty Ltd v Hancock Prospecting Pty Ltd, a major commercial dispute before the Supreme Court of Western Australia. The case involves complex claims relating to iron ore royalties and ownership of tenements in the Pilbara, stemming from agreements made between Lang Hancock and Peter Wright in the 1970s.
