= Stephen Hall (judge) =

Australian jurist

The Honourable Justice Stephen David Hall

Personal details
- Education: University of Western Australia
- Profession: Barrister, jurist

Stephen Hall is an Australian jurist who is a judge of the Supreme Court of Western Australia. He was appointed to the general (trial) division of the court in 2009. In 2022, he was appointed as a permanent judge of the appeal division of the Court (the Court of Appeal).

== Career ==
Stephen Hall is a graduate of the University of Western Australia earning a Bachelor of Jurisprudence in 1983, a Bachelor of Laws in 1984 and Bachelor of Arts in 1987.

He was admitted as a lawyer in 1985, after serving articles at the firm Lohrmann, Tindal and Guthrie. He joined the Office of the Commonwealth Director of Public Prosecutions in Perth in 1986. He worked in the Major Fraud Branch as part of a team dealing with large scale taxation fraud. He went on to work in the General Prosecutions Branch, and appeared as counsel in cases involving drugs, fraud, people-smuggling and fisheries. He was then appointed as the Senior Assistant Director in the Commercial Prosecutions Branch in 1991. In this role, he led prosecutions in a number of high profile cases, including the prosecution of Alan Bond for the Bell Cash Strip, at that time the largest fraud case in Australian history.

In 1999, Hall joined the Independent Bar of Western Australia. He initially took chambers at Wickham Chambers before later moving to Francis Burt Chambers. At the bar he specialised in white collar crime, corporate regulation, insolvency and corruption prevention.

In 2001, Hall was appointed counsel assisting the royal commission into the Finance Broking Industry. In 2002, he was appointed counsel assisting the Police Royal Commission. He was also retained as counsel assisting the Corruption and Crime Commission in a number of investigations in which public hearings were held. These included hearings into allegations of misuse of public office and political lobbying. In 2003 he was appointed Senior Counsel (SC).

From 2006 to 2009, Hall was retained as National in-house counsel by the Commonwealth Director of Public Prosecutions. In this role he appeared as counsel in trials and appeals in South Australia, Queensland, Victoria, the Northern Territory and the Australian Capital Territory.

Hall was appointed as a judge of the Supreme Court on 6 July 2009. For four years, he was the judge in charge of the criminal list. At this time he became well known as the presiding judge in a number of high-profile cases:

- Dr Chamari Liyanage, 2016
- Jemma Lilley and Trudi Lenon, 2018
- Anthony Robert Harvey, 2019 - first prisoner in Western Australia sentenced to life without the possibility of parole
- Claremont serial killings, 2020
- Francis Wark, 2021
- The Motorplex Sniper (murder of bikie boss Nick Martin), 2021

In 2022, Hall was appointed as a permanent judge of the Court of Appeal, the highest court in the hierarchy in Western Australia. He had previously served as an acting judge of appeal.
