= David Newnes =

Australian lawyer and judge

David Wallace Newnes is an Australian lawyer and judge who was a member of the Court of Appeal of Western Australia.

In 1978, Newnes graduated from the Law School at the University of Western Australia. That same year, after completing articles of clerkship with the Australian law firm Muir Williams Nicholson, Newnes was admitted to legal practice.

In 1982, Newnes joined Hong Kong law firm Mallesons Stephen Jaques as a solicitor. In 1985, he became a litigation partner with the firm. In 1995, Newnes became a litigation partner and head of the litigation practice of the Perth, Western Australia office of Blake Dawson Waldron.

In 2003, Newnes was appointed a Master of the Court to the Supreme Court of Western Australia. In 2007, Newnes became a justice and on 24 February 2009, was appointed to the Court of Appeal of Western Australia. Newnes retired from the Court in 2017 after 14 years of service.
