= State Administrative Tribunal =

Body that reviews administrative decisions

The State Administrative Tribunal (SAT) was established in Western Australia in 2005 as an independent body that makes and reviews a range of administrative decisions. Individuals, businesses, public officials and vocational boards can bring before the SAT many different types of applications related to civil, commercial and personal matters. These range from reviews of multimillion-dollar tax judgments and dog destruction orders to disciplinary proceedings, guardianship questions and town planning and compensation issues.

The SAT was established by the State Administrative Tribunal Act 2004 and the State Administrative Tribunal (Conferral of Jurisdiction) Amendment and Repeal Act 2004 (Conferral Act). The Conferral Act refers to more than 150 existing Acts of Parliament, known as enabling Acts. The enabling Acts give the SAT the jurisdiction to make decisions on specific matters.

The SAT:

- aims to make the correct or preferable decision based on the merits of each application;
- is not a court and, therefore, strict rules of evidence do not apply;
- encourages the resolution of disputes through mediation;
- allows parties to be represented by a lawyer, a person with relevant experience or by themselves;
- holds hearings in public in most cases; and
- provides reasons for all decisions and publishes most of them on the website.

The SAT's objectives are set out in the State Administrative Tribunal Act 2004.

== Areas ==
Given its broad jurisdiction, SAT matters are divided into four areas that enable procedures to be adapted to suit the type of matter and the needs of different people who use the SAT. The areas are:

- Human Rights

Makes decisions that affect some of the most vulnerable people in our community in relation to guardianship, administration and discrimination, and reviews decisions of the Mental Health Review Board.

- Development & Resources

Reviews decisions made by Government regarding planning, development and resources, and hears matters relating to land valuation and compensation.

- Vocational Regulation

Hears complaints concerning occupational misconduct and reviews decisions concerning licensing.

- Commercial & Civil

Deals with strata title and retirement village disputes, commercial tenancy and credit and reviews State revenue decisions and other commercial and personal matters.

== Organisation ==
A Supreme Court judge is President of the Tribunal. The President is assisted by two deputy presidents, who are District Court judges, and a number of members who are experienced in relevant fields.

In 2007 the WA Parliament (Standing Committee on Legislation) commenced an inquiry into operations of the SAT. It resulted in the 2009 report "Inquiry into the Jurisdiction and Operation of the State Administrative Tribunal".
