= Michael Buss =

Australian judge

The Honourable Michael John Buss KC

Judge of the Supreme Court of Western Australia
- In office 1 February 2006 – 4 June 2025

President of the Court of Appeal of the Supreme Court of Western Australia
- In office 18 July 2016 – 4 June 2025

Personal details
- Born: 4 June 1955 (age 70) Perth, Western Australia

Michael John Buss is a former judge of the Supreme Court of Western Australia. He was the President of the Court of Appeal from 18 July 2016 to 4 June 2025.

== Education ==
Buss was born in Western Australia and grew up in New South Wales. He returned to Western Australia and completed studies in jurisprudence and law at the University of Western Australia.

== Legal career ==
Buss initially practised as a solicitor in Perth. He joined the independent bar in Western Australia in 1987, making appearances in the High Court of Australia. He was appointed a Queen's Counsel in December 1993.

Buss was appointed as a Judge of the Supreme Court (including the Court of Appeal) on 1 February 2006 and as President of the Court of Appeal on 18 July 2016. He retired in 2025. Joshua Thomson KC was appointed as his successor as President of the Court of Appeal.
