= District Court of Western Australia =

Court in Western Australia

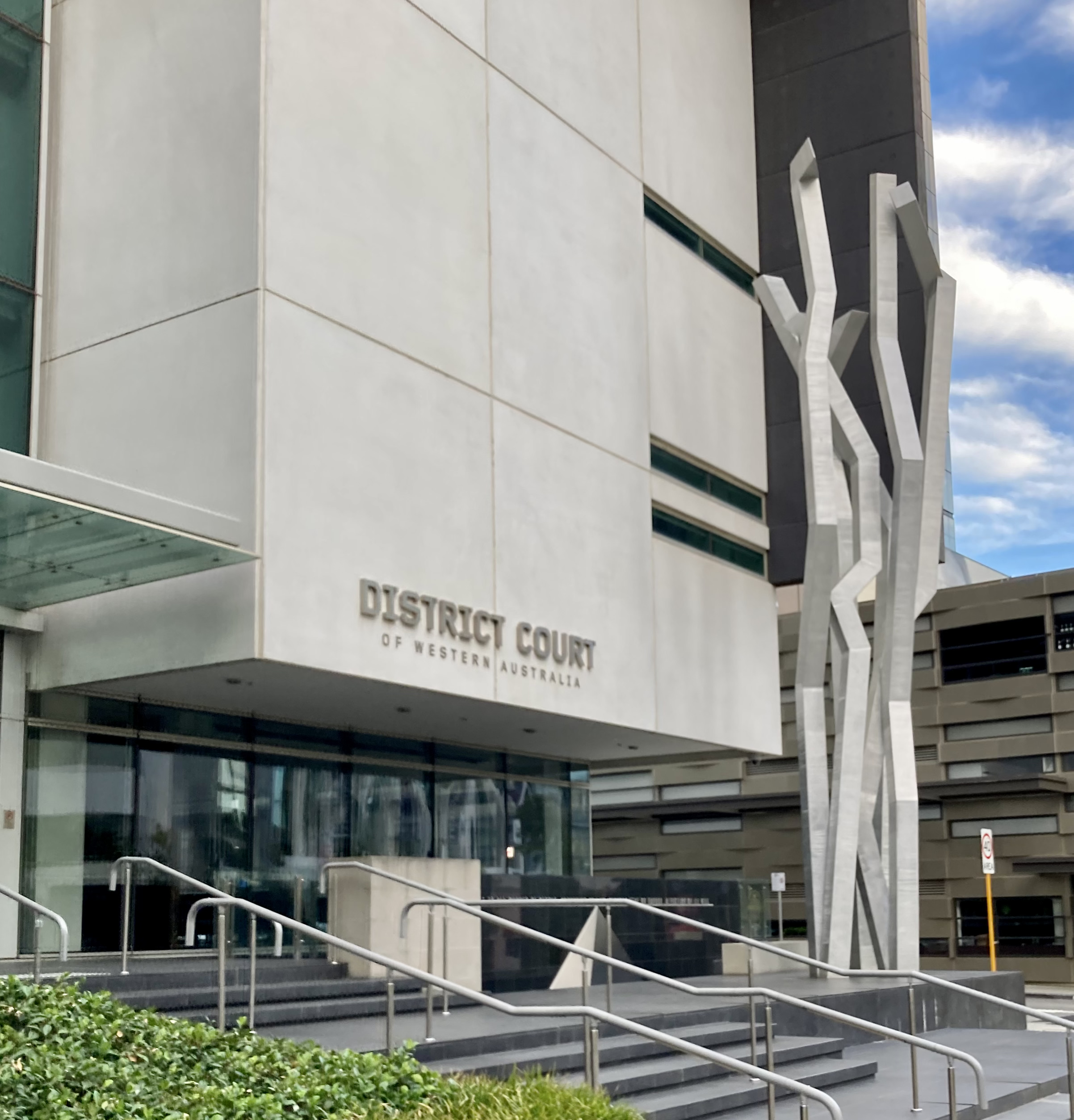
- The District Court building in Perth
- Interactive map of District Court of Western Australia
- Established: 1 Apr 1970
- Jurisdiction: Western Australia
- Location: Headquartered in Perth with 12 country registries located in Albany, Broome, Bunbury, Busselton, Carnarvon, Derby, Esperance, Geraldton, Kalgoorlie, Karratha, Kununurra, and South Hedland.
- Composition method: Governor appointed by the recommendation of Cabinet.
- Authorised by: Parliament of Western Australia via the: District Court Act 1969 (WA)
- Appeals to: Supreme Court of Western Australia
- Appeals from: Magistrates Court of Western Australia
- Judge term length: Mandatory retirement by age of 70
- Website: https://districtcourt.wa.gov.au/

Chief Judge
- Currently: Julie Anne Wager
- Since: 2 May 2020

The District Court of Western Australia is the intermediate court in Western Australia. The District Court commenced in 1970, amid additional stress placed on the existing Magistrates Court and Supreme Court due to the increasing population of Western Australia. At its inception, the Court consisted of four judges: Sydney Howard Good, William Page Pidgeon, Desmond Charles Heenan, and Robert Edmond Jones.

In the Criminal jurisdiction it hears serious, indictable criminal offences for which the maximum penalty is 25 years imprisonment. In the Civil jurisdiction, the District Court hears civil claims of up to $750 000 and has unlimited jurisdiction in claims for damages in personal injury cases. Decisions from the Magistrates Court and some tribunals can be appealed against in the District Court. The court is low in the Australian court hierarchy. The headquarters complex includes the Perth District Court registry, while 12 other registries exist in regional WA.

The current Chief Judge of the District Court is Julie Anne Wager, who has held the position since 2 May 2020.

== History ==
Prior to the District Court's commencement, Western Australia's court system had two tiers: the lower tier consisting of the Court of Petty Sessions and the Local Court; and the upper tier consisting solely of the Supreme Court. The Supreme Court held jurisdiction over all indictable criminal offences and civil matters, whilst the Court of Petty Sessions held jurisdiction over summary criminal offences, committal jurisdiction for indictable offences, whilst the Local Court had jurisdiction to hear civil claims not exceeding $1,000, and not on categories of claims including ejectment, title to land, wills, libel, slander, seduction or breach of promise of marriage. The most distinct separation in decision making was between the jurisdiction of judges, who were officers of the Supreme Court, and stipendiary magistrates and Justices of the Peace of the lower Courts.

Following World War II, Western Australia experienced positive annual population growth of approximately 3%. The population grew from 481,530 in 1944 to 954,846 by 1969. During this period and towards the beginning of the 1960s, public interest in establishing an intermediary Court began, as the court system experienced an increased volume of legal matters. A particular example is the near doubling of divorce petitions heard by the Supreme Court, increasing from 570 in 1960 to 1,006 in 1968.

Whilst the issues were identified in the middle of the 1960s, government officials delayed the introduction of the Court in order to consult legal professionals and their bodies, such as the Law Society of Western Australia. A sub-committee within the Law Society was established and recommended a District Court that would serve the entire Western Australian state, with a base in Perth and rotational registrars in other localities. An alternative proposal was investigated by the then Chief Justice of the Supreme Court of Western Australia, Sir Albert Wolff KCMG, which would be to establish an intermediary court in the north of Western Australia to accommodate growing populations.

The District Court of Western Australia Act 1969 was passed by both Houses of the Western Australian Parliament on 17 November 1969, with the District Court commencing on 1 April 1970 following a proclamation by the Governor Douglas Kendrew on 26 March. According to Griffith (1969), the District Court was introduced to "enable adequate administration of justice in our expanding community." Griffith (1969) identified four key advantages to establishing a District Court, being (a) decentralising the legal profession to serve areas outside of Perth, (b) enabling Western Australia to legislate for uncontentious divorce petitions to be heard in the District Court, (c) preventing backlog in the Supreme Court, and (d) to establish a flexible judicial system for future administration of justice.

== Legal developments since commencement ==
The District Court has introduced judicial features to assist the expedience of the court process. An example is the introduction of case management for criminal cases by Chief Judge Antoinette Kennedy, which reduced criminal proceeding durations by 56 weeks to an average of 20 weeks. A more recent development has been the introduction of electronic document filing and trial systems for civil proceedings.

== Jurisdiction ==
Unlike other Australian district courts, the District Court of Western Australia is not an inferior court in respect of its criminal jurisdiction. It is a superior court, meaning it has unlimited jurisdiction for criminal matters and derives its power from legislation.

The District Court is given the jurisdiction to hear criminal cases. At introduction, the District Court only had jurisdiction over indictable offences where the maximum punishment was less than 14 years, as these matters were tried in the Supreme Court. As the judicial system has reformed, the District Court now has jurisdiction over all indictable offences except for murder, manslaughter, attempts to unlawfully kill and the offence of preventing the birth of a live child. The District Court can hear appeals to reconsider the factual evidence from a primary court such as the local court.

The District Court also holds jurisdiction to determine civil actions. Initially, the limit on claimable sum was $6,000 at the Court's inception, but that has since been increased to a limit of $750,000. It is unclear whether or not the District Court can exercise equitable jurisdiction, however the District Court held that its legislating act does not expressly confer on the Court jurisdiction to grant the equitable remedy of specific performance.

Appeals can be made against decisions of the District Court. Appeals are made to the Court of Appeals division of the Supreme Court.

== Rules ==
Cases determined in the District Court must follow the District Court Rules 2005 (WA). Between 1996 and 2005, District Court cases were required to abide by the District Court Rules 1996 (WA). These rules include the filing and service of court documents, rules regarding pre-trial case management, rules regarding the submission and handling of evidence, and rules regarding appeals heard in the District Court.

In addition, cases heard in the District Court must also follow the rules of the Supreme Court, unless there is an inconsistency in which case the District Court Rules 2005 (WA) prevails.

== Buildings ==
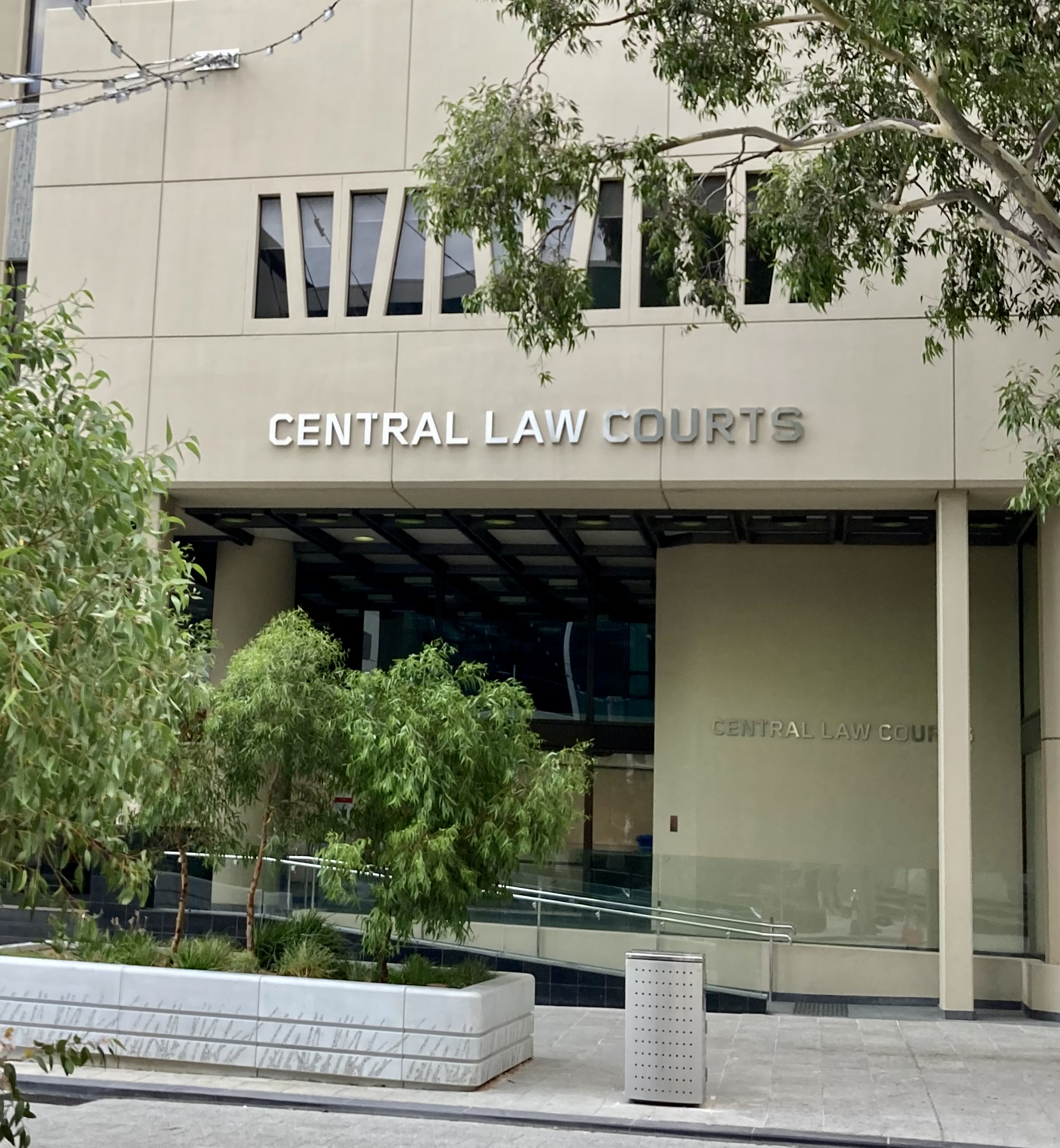
Central Law Courts building, which is the current residence of the Magistrates Court

=== Perth Registry ===
The District Court was initially situated in the Old Supreme Court Building in Perth, but moved to the Public Trust Office in 1971 where it sat for ten years until 1982. The District Court then moved to the Central Law Courts which finished construction and was opened in 1982. The Central Law Courts initially housed both the Perth District Court registry and the lower courts, however by the 1990s and 2000s it was recognised that the District Court had accumulated systemic backlog and had outgrown the Central Law Courts building.

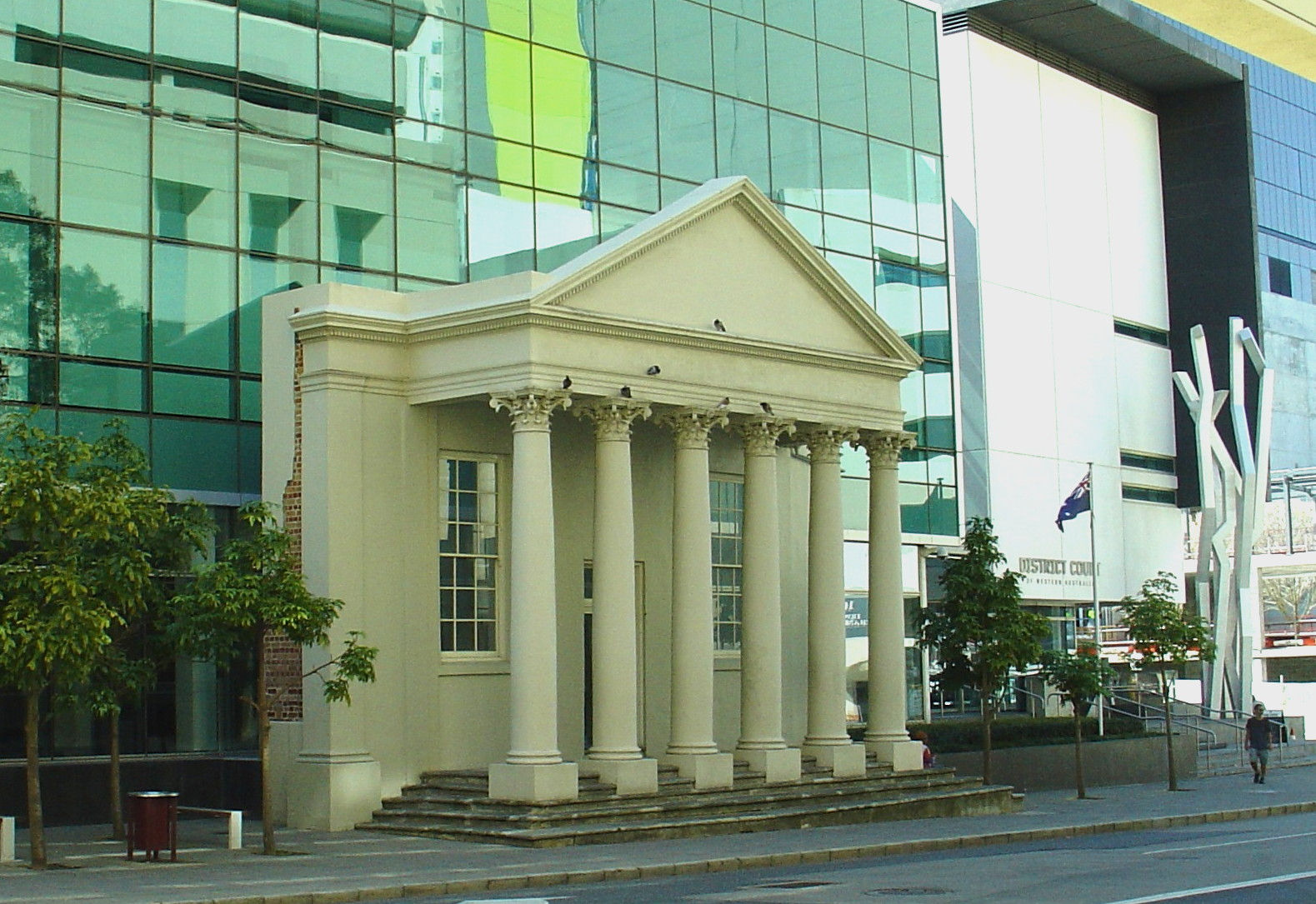
St Georges Hall facade as part of the District Court Building

The District Court's current residence at 500 Hay Street was the location of the former St George's Hall, which was an entertainment theatre built in 1879. Its portico façade is heritage listed, and was retained on the external walls of the Courthouse after considerable liaison with the Heritage Council.

The present District Court building began construction in 2005, with the building being completed in 2008. Its location is opposite the Central Law Courts Building, and there is a subterranean connection between the two buildings. The building has fifteen levels, with a total of 24 courtrooms and 32 judges’ chambers.

=== Circuit Courts ===
The District Court has 12 other registries, located at Albany, Broome, Bunbury, Busselton, Carnarvon, Derby, Esperance, Geraldton, Kalgoorlie, Karratha, Kununurra, and South Hedland, which hear predominantly criminal trials. 737 total criminal hearings, including both sentencing hearings and trials, were heard in the Circuit courts in 2019. In the year 2000, the District Court allocated 120 ‘judge weeks’ to all 12 Circuit courts, with this increasing to around 140 weeks by 2019.

== Judicial Appointments ==
=== Appointment criteria ===
The District Court of Western Australia Act 1969 introduced criteria for the appointment of judges. Judges are appointed by the Governor of Western Australia, and enjoy tenure of office on the condition of good behaviour, although the Governor can "upon the address of both Houses of Parliament, remove any District Court judge from his office and revoke his commission". As with Supreme Court judges, District Court judges have a mandatory retirement age of 70 years. Judges are eligible for appointment if they are admitted lawyers in Australia, and have no less than eight years of legal experience.

Auxiliary judges can also be appointed for a period not exceeding 12 months, where a judge of the District or Supreme Courts has exceeded the age of retirement. Auxiliary judges are appointed where there are pending proceedings that a retiring judge is involved in, so that the hearing or determination can be completed by the retiring judge.

Following the introduction of the Children's Court of Western Australia, District Court judges may simultaneously hold judicial office in the Children's Court.

=== Chief Judges ===
At its inception, the District Court had four serving judges, with Sydney Good appointed as the first Chairman of Judges. The title of Chairman of Judges was later changed to Chief Judge, during the tenure of Desmond Heenan. To date there have been eight Chief Judges.

| Chief Judge | Period of tenure as Chief Judge |
|---|---|
| Sydney Good | 1970 - 1977 |
| William Pidgeon | 1977 - 1982 |
| Desmond Heenan | 1982 - 1995 |
| Kevin Hammond | 1995 - 2004 |
| Antoinette Kennedy | 2004 - 2010 |
| Peter Martino | 2010 - 2015 |
| Kevin Sleight | 2015 - 2020 |
| Julie Wager | 2020–present |

=== Current judges ===
The District Court of Western Australia currently has 34 judges, including the Chief Judge Julie Wager and one auxiliary judge, Bruce Goetze.

| Chief Judge | Date of appointment |
|---|---|
| Julie Wager | 28/01/2005; appointed Chief Judge 02/05/2020 |

| Judges | Date of appointment |
|---|---|
| Andrew Stavrianou | 10/04/2006 |
| Troy Sweeney SC | 03/07/2006 |
| Michael Bowden | 06/03/2007 |
| Christopher Stevenson | 03/12/2007 |
| John Staude | 08/03/2010 |
| Timothy Sharp | 02/08/2010 |
| David Parry | 20/06/2011 |
| Mark Herron | 01/07/2013 |
| Vicki Stewart | 28/10/2014 |
| Laurence Levy SC | 08/12/2014 |
| Linda Petrusa SC | 02/06/2015 |
| Michael Gething | 12/02/2016 |
| Alan Troy | 23/03/2016 |
| Belinda Lonsdale | 09/01/2017 |
| Fiona Vernon | 09/01/2018 |
| Hylton Quail | 09/01/2018 |
| Kathleen Glancy | 09/01/2018 |
| Wendy Gillan | 12/02/2018 |
| John Prior | 06/03/2018 |
| Amanda Burrows SC | 15/03/2018 |
| Stephen Lemonis | 01/02/2019 |
| David MacLean | 14/01/2020 |
| Charlotte Wallace | 14/01/2020 |
| Mara Barone SC | 06/05/2020 |
| Martin Flynn | 03/08/2020 |
| Gary Massey | 03/08/2020 |
| Karen Shepherd | 03/08/2020 |
| Sarah Russell | 01/12/2020 |
| Carmel Barbagallo SC | 01/02/2021 |
| Lisa Tovey | 09/06/2021 |
| Natalie Whitby | 09/06/2021 |
| Christian Miocevich | 23/08/2021 |
| Bruce Goetze (Auxiliary Judge) | 04/11/2020 |
