= Supreme Court of Western Australia =

Highest court in the State of Western Australia

- Arms authorised for the seal of court

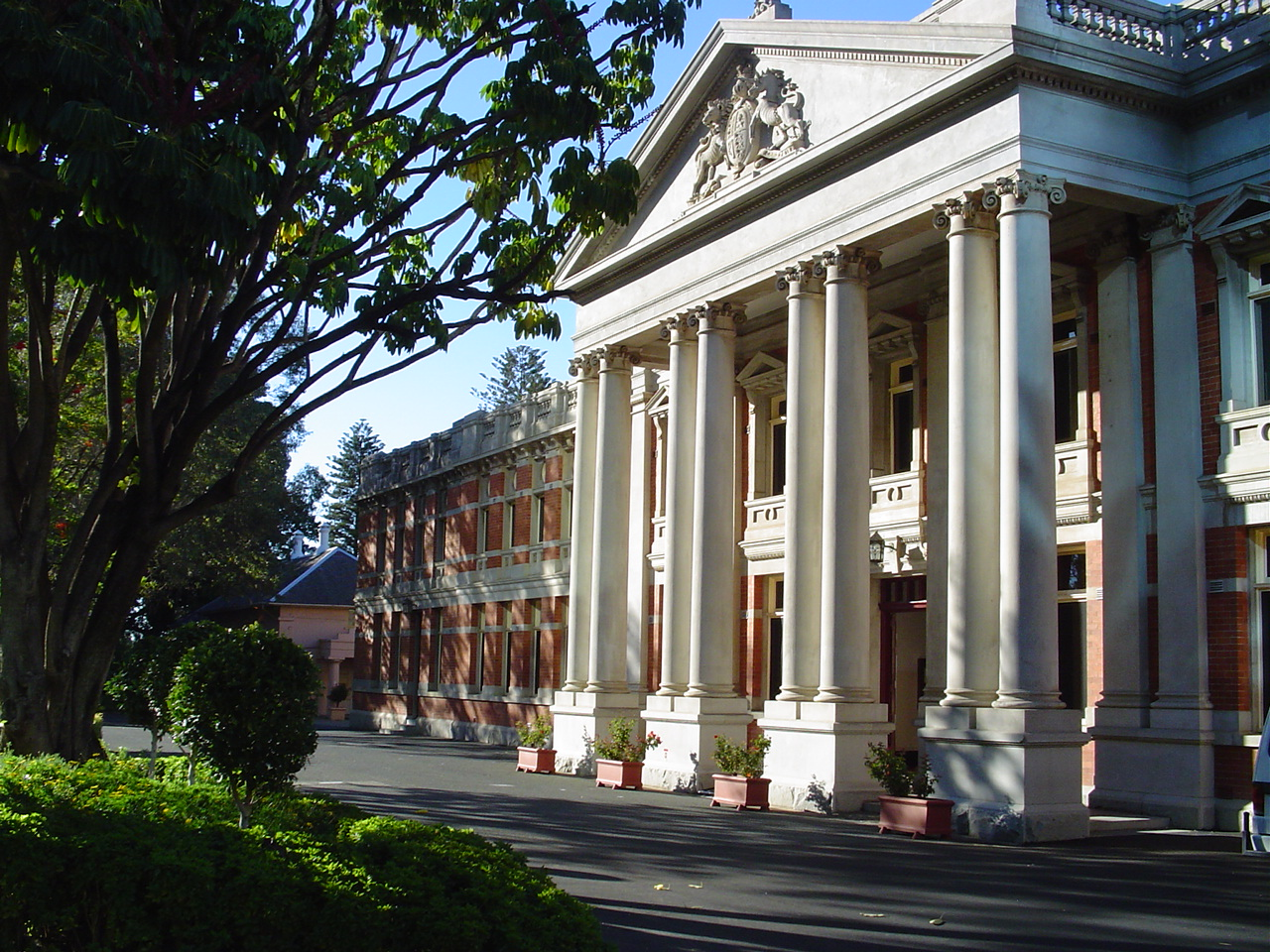
- Façade of the Supreme Court of Western Australia
- Interactive map of Supreme Court of Western Australia
- 31°57′27″S 115°51′36″E
- Established: 18 June 1861
- Jurisdiction: Western Australia
- Location: Perth
- Coordinates: 31°57′27″S 115°51′36″E
- Composition method: Governor appointed by the recommendation of Cabinet.
- Authorised by: Parliament of Western Australia via the: Constitution Act 1889 (WA); Supreme Court Act 1935 (WA)
- Appeals to: High Court of Australia
- Appeals from: District Court of WA; Magistrates Court of WA; Family Court of WA; State Administrative Tribunal; Children's Court of Western Australia
- Judge term length: Mandatory retirement by age 70
- Number of positions: As many as necessary to deal with workload; currently 21 judges
- Website: www.supremecourt.wa.gov.au

Chief Justice of Western Australia
- Currently: Justice Peter Quinlan
- Since: 13 August 2018

The Supreme Court of Western Australia is the highest state court in the Australian State of Western Australia. It has unlimited jurisdiction within the state in civil matters (although it usually only hears matters involving sums of A$750,000 or more), and hears the most serious criminal matters.

== Structure ==
The Supreme Court consists of a General Division (equivalent to the Trial Division in other states) and the Court of Appeal.

The General Division deals with serious criminal matters, civil cases where the dispute is of a complex nature or the amount claimed is greater than $750,000, criminal appeals from the Magistrates Court and appeals from other bodies such as the State Administrative Tribunal. The General Division sits in the David Malcolm Justice Centre for civil proceedings and the District Court of WA Building and the original Supreme Court Building for criminal proceedings.

The Court of Appeal hears both civil and criminal appeals from cases in the General Division, the District Court and the State Administrative Tribunal. It sits in the original Supreme Court Building.

When required, Supreme Court judges may also constitute the Industrial Appeal Court and sit as a Court of Disputed Returns.

The Supreme Court holds the exclusive jurisdiction to admit solicitors and barristers to practice in the Western Australian jurisdiction, upon meeting the educational and practice requirements set by the Legal Practice Board of Western Australia.

The current Chief Justice of the Supreme Court is the Honourable Chief Justice Peter Quinlan SC who was appointed to the position in August 2018.

== History ==
The Supreme Court was established on 18 June 1861 when the Court of Quarter Sessions (a criminal court for serious matters) and the Civil Court were amalgamated by the Supreme Court Ordinance 1861 (24 Vict. No. 15). Sir Archibald Burt was the first Chief Justice of the court.

The Full Court of the Supreme Court was established in 1886 to decide both criminal and civil appeals. In 1893 the criminal appeals were transferred to the Court of Appeal which was then reconstituted as the Court of Criminal Appeal in 1911.

The Supreme Court, Full Court and Court of Criminal Appeal were effectively the one court with each judge able to sit on cases in any of the courts.

Plans to relocate the Court building were announced to the public in March 1901, after a parliamentary committee examined various options and decided on the current location on St Georges Terrace. A government decree that only local materials be used in the construction caused difficulties and delays, culminating in a royal commission in 1902. Finally, the new building was officially opened on 8 June 1903, by newly-arrived governor, Sir Frederick Bedford.

In 2004 the Full Court and the Court of Criminal Appeal were subsumed by the Court of Appeal, which, while still a division of the Supreme Court, has judges which sit solely on appeal cases.

== Judicial officers ==
The Supreme Court is currently constituted by the following judicial officers (in order of seniority):

=== Chief Justice ===
- Peter Quinlan (13 August 2018)

=== President of the Court of Appeal ===
- Michael Buss (18 July 2016; appointed as Judge of Appeal on 1 February 2006)

=== Judges of the Court of Appeal ===
- Robert Mazza (2011; appointed as Judge on 4 March 2010)
- Robert Mitchell (18 July 2016; appointed as Judge in October 2014)
- Janine Pritchard (President, State Administrative Tribunal as of 4 June 2019; appointed as Judge of Appeal on 13 September 2018; appointed as Judge on 11 June 2010)
- John Vaughan (4 June 2019; appointed as Judge on 30 April 2018)
- Stephen Hall (3 October 2022; appointed as Judge on 3 July 2009)
- Samuel Vandongen (22 May 2023; appointed as Judge on 2 November 2022)

=== Judges of the General Division ===
- Paul Tottle (10 August 2015)
- Bruno Fiannaca (31 August 2015)
- Joseph McGrath (28 November 2016)
- Gail Archer (29 May 2017)
- Jennifer Smith (27 June 2018; acting judge from 1 August 2017)
- Jennifer Hill (4 June 2019)
- Larissa Strk (9 June 2021)
- Marcus Solomon (4 August 2021)
- Amanda Forrester (1 July 2022)
- Michael Lundberg (23 November 2022)
- Fiona Seaward (7 March 2023)
- Natalie Whitby (22 May 2023)
- Stephen Lemonis (26 June 2023)
- Matthew Howard (17 July 2023)
- Alain Musikanth (6 November 2023)
- Kathleen Glancy (29 January 2024)
- Garry Cobby (29 January 2024)

=== Master ===
- Sarah Russell

=== Principal Registrar ===
- Danielle Davies

=== Registrars ===
- June Eaton (Registrar Court of Appeal)
- Rainer Gilich
- Janet Whitbread
- Mark Fatharly
- Prudence Griffin
- Acacia Hosking
- Brendyn Nelson
- Leanne Allison

== Supreme Court building ==
Supreme Court Building
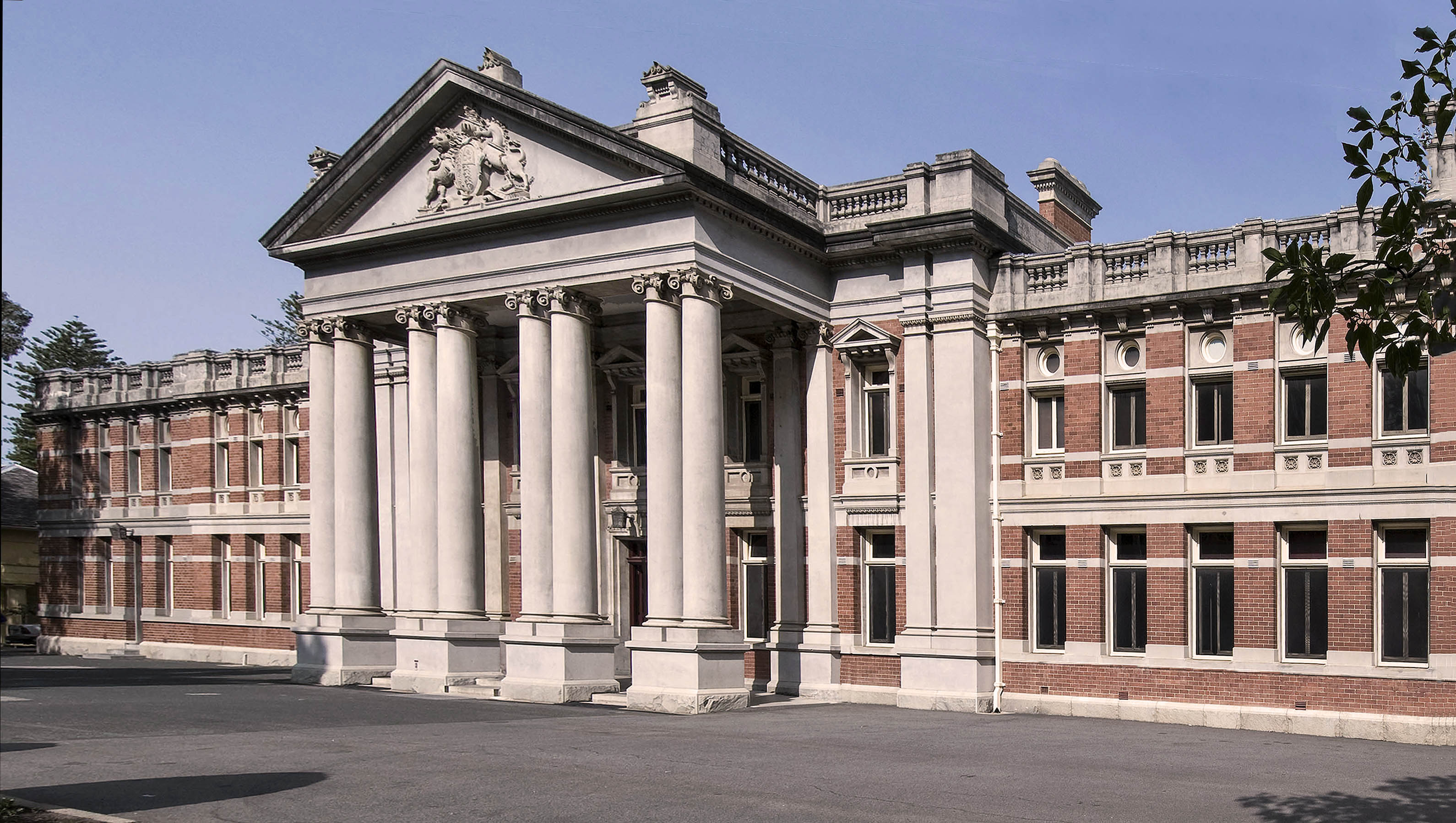
- Supreme Court, north front

General information
- Type: Heritage listed building
- Location: Perth, Western Australia

Western Australia Heritage Register
- Official name: Supreme Court Buildings and Gardens, Old Court House, Stirling Gardens
- Type: State Registered Place
- Designated: 14 February 2003
- Reference no.: 1947

The Supreme Court building has considerable heritage significance in Western Australia. In 1899, a joint parliamentary committee was formed to decide on the location of the new court building with three sites being considered. The locations were a site in Irwin Street, the old Government Boys' School on St George's Terrace and the current site. After a decision was made and a contract awarded for £A 55,888 11s 3p, equivalent to A$9,627,809.21 in 2022, to RP Vincent and Sons in February 1901, an announcement was made to the public during March of that year. The foundation stone was laid on 2 June 1902 and would open on 8 June 1903 with WA Governor Sir Frederick Bedford present as was the Chief Justice Sir Edward Stone and the full court.

The two-storey brick building was designed by John Harry Grainger (father of Percy Grainger), Chief Architect with the Public Works Department of Western Australia. It is designed in the Federation Academic Classical style: a style that was often used for major public buildings of the time. The original design called for only local materials to be used with Donnybrook stone, Meckering granite and jarrah wood the choice. Stuccoed cement had to be substituted when insufficient quantities of Donnybrook stone of identical texture and colour were lacking for the building. Another change was the slate roof, when a galvanized roof was installed instead saving £5,425. Originally, the grand foyer was to be painted in colours reflecting those of the glass domes, but again shortage of funds dictated the substitution of whitewash. The foyer was more appropriately redecorated to celebrate the Court's centenary in 2003.

Images of Supreme Court
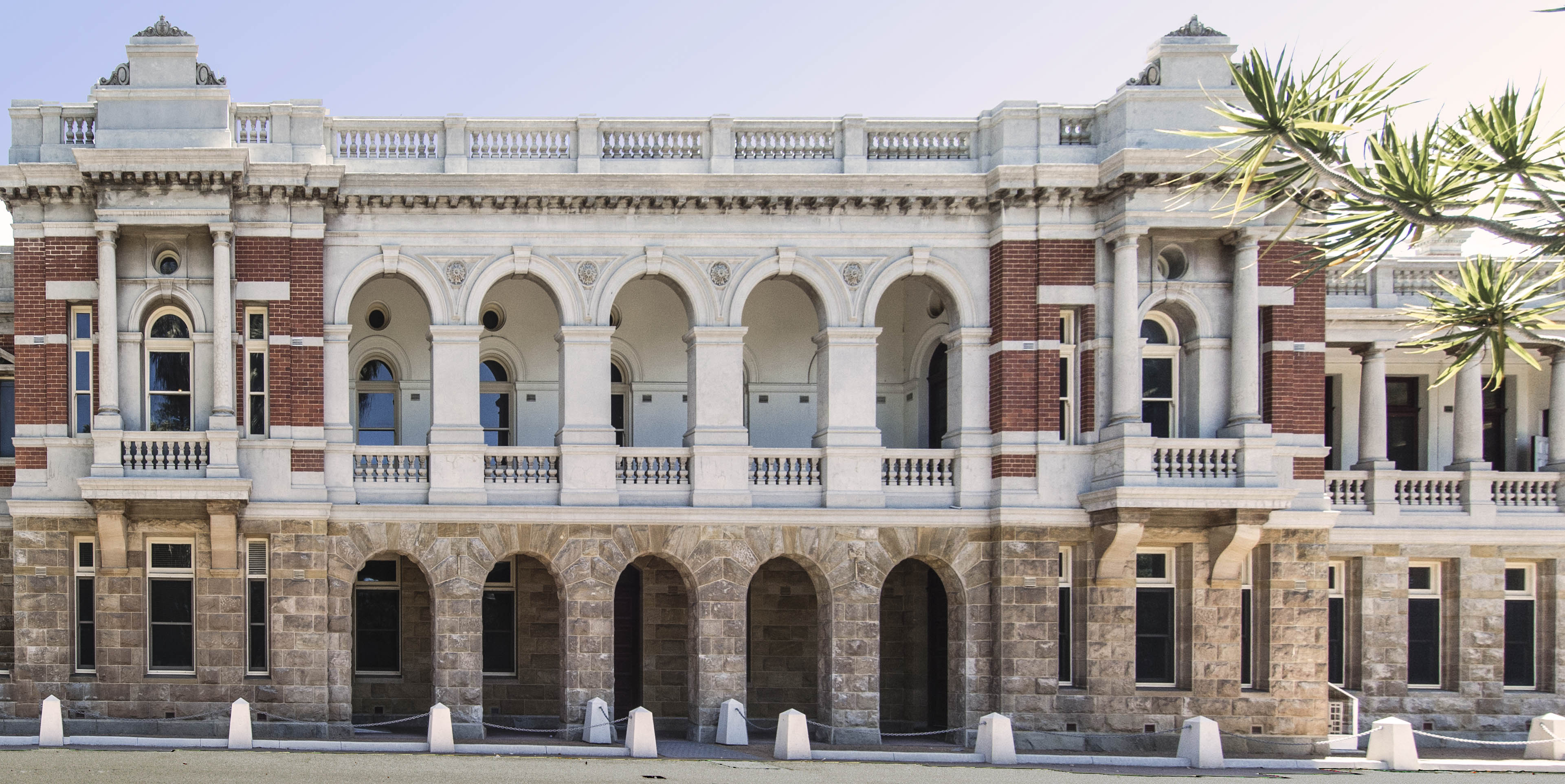
Supreme Court, south front

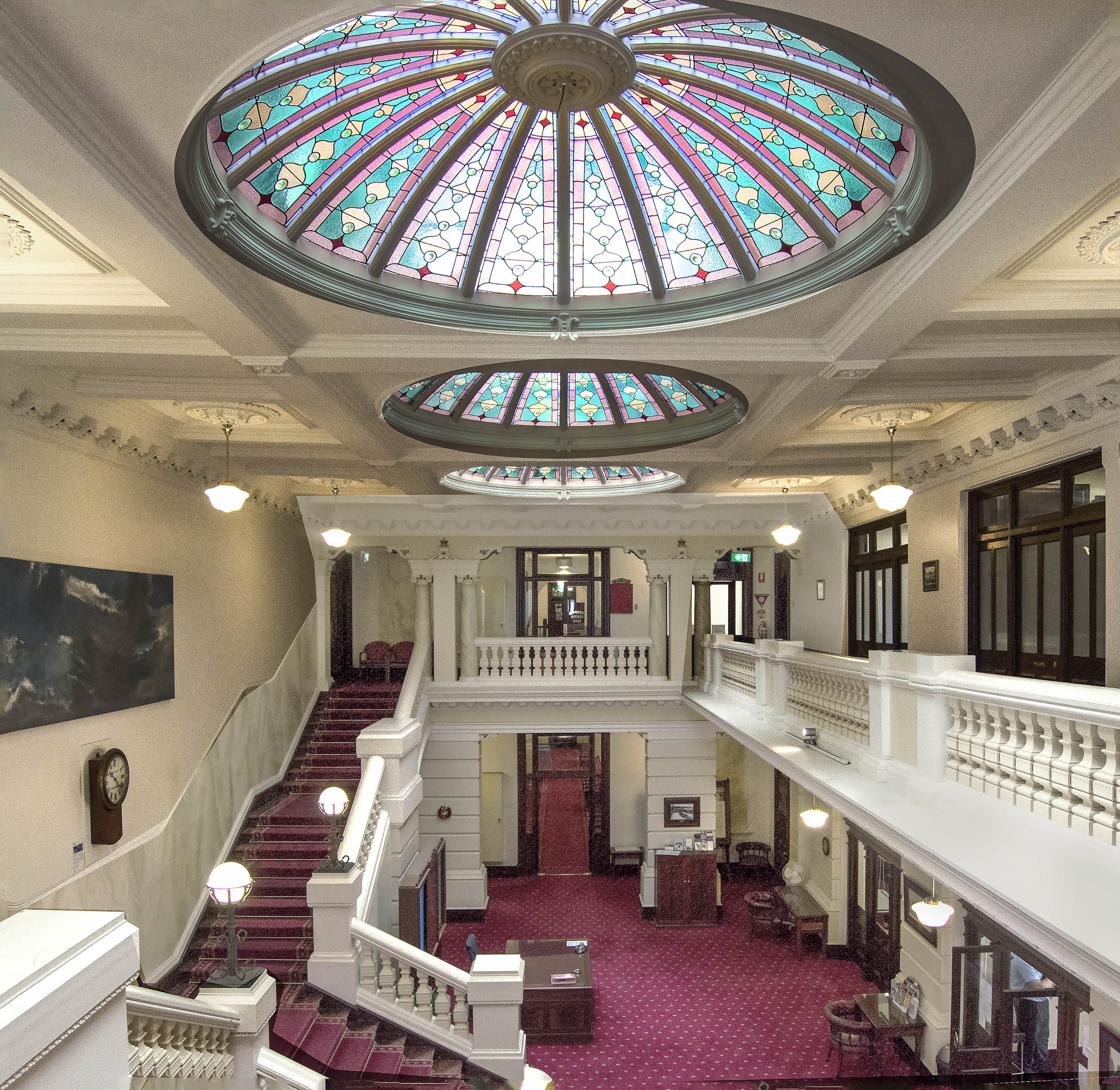
Main foyer

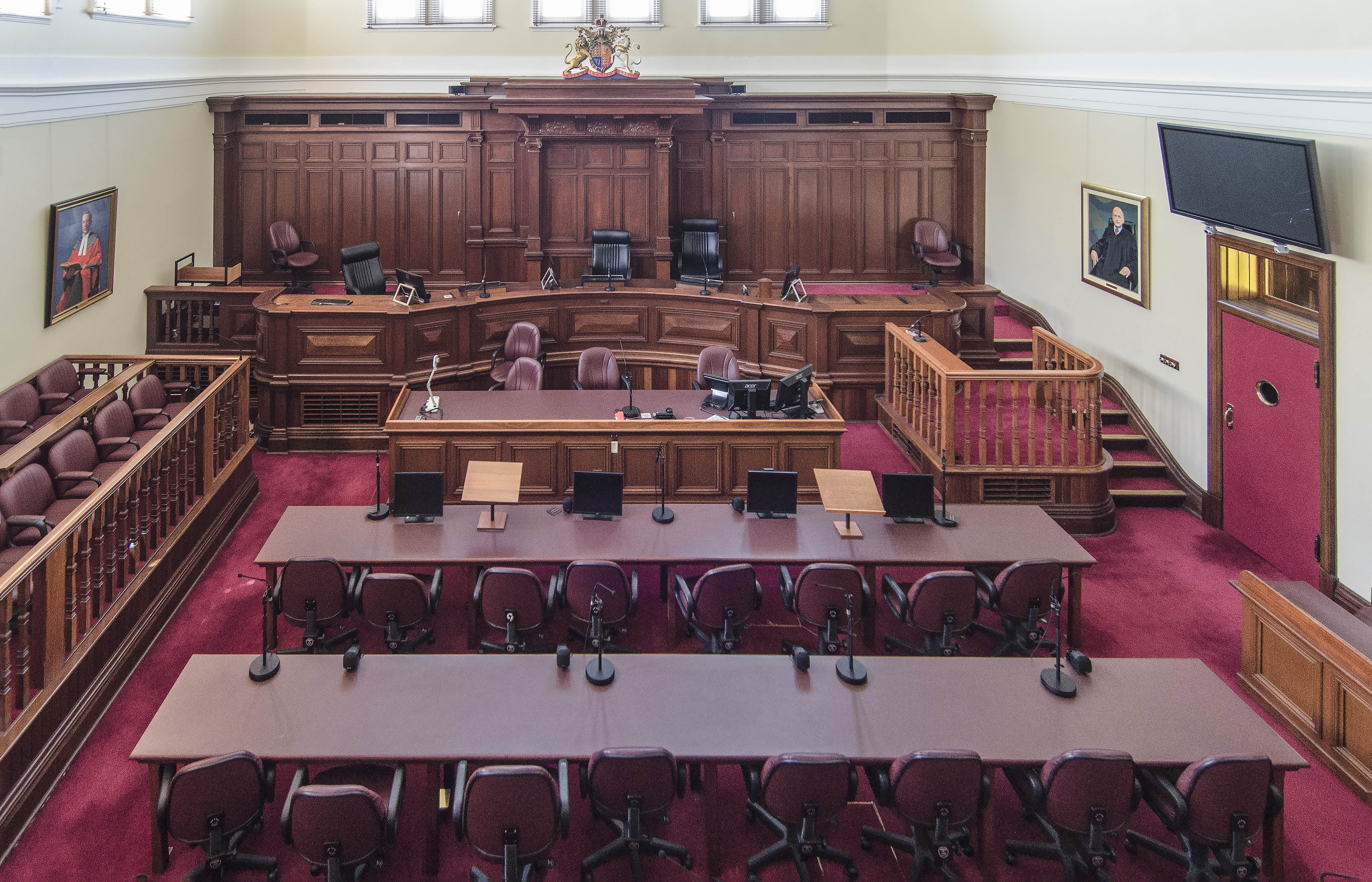
Court number 1

== David Malcolm Justice Centre ==
On 11 July 2016, the Supreme Court's Registry and General Division (Civil) relocated from the original Supreme Court Building to the new David Malcolm Justice Centre located at 28 Barrack Street which is immediately north of the State Buildings complex.

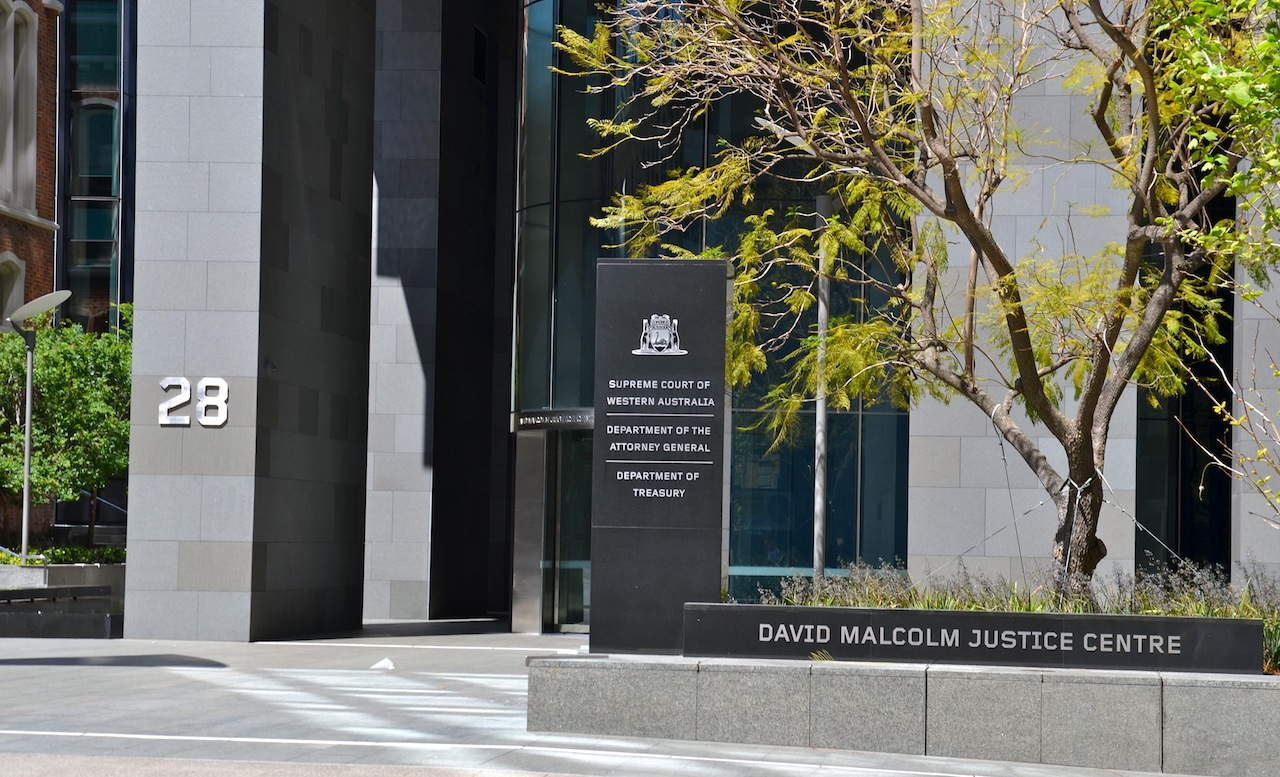
Entrance to building

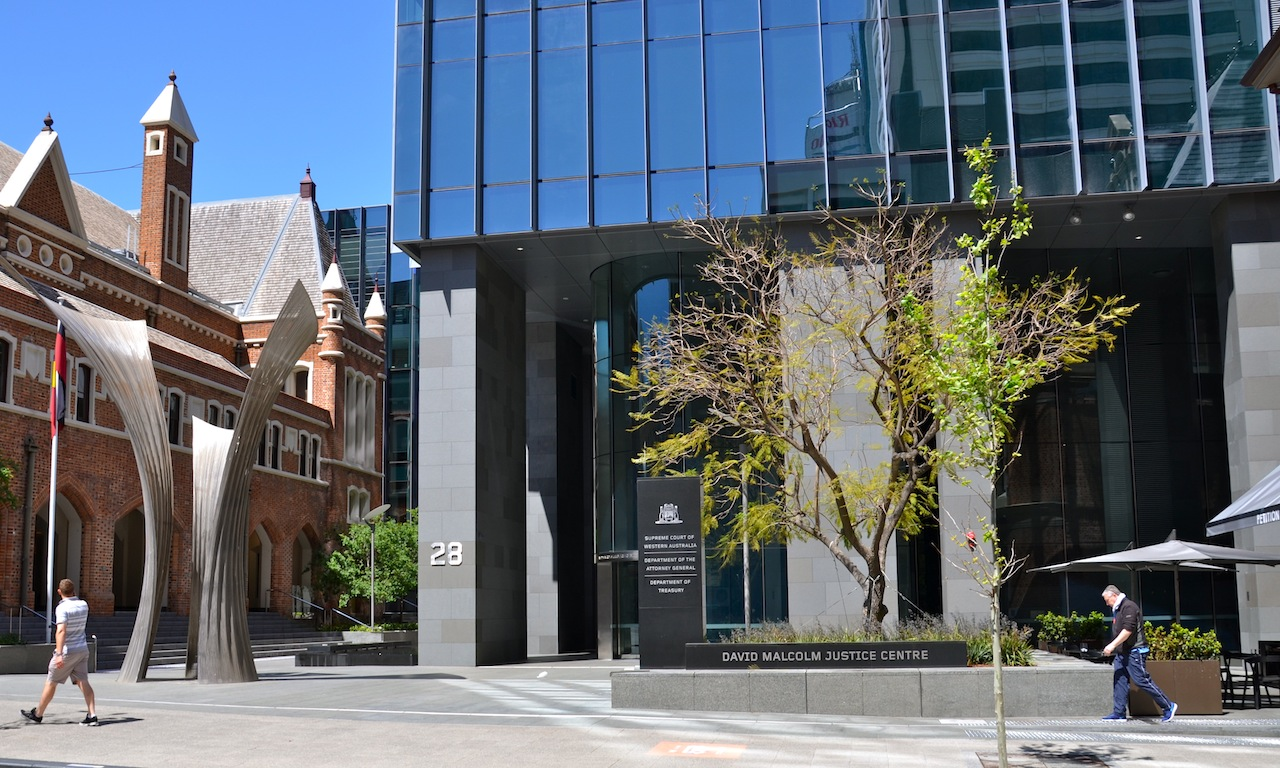
With Perth Town Hall to the north

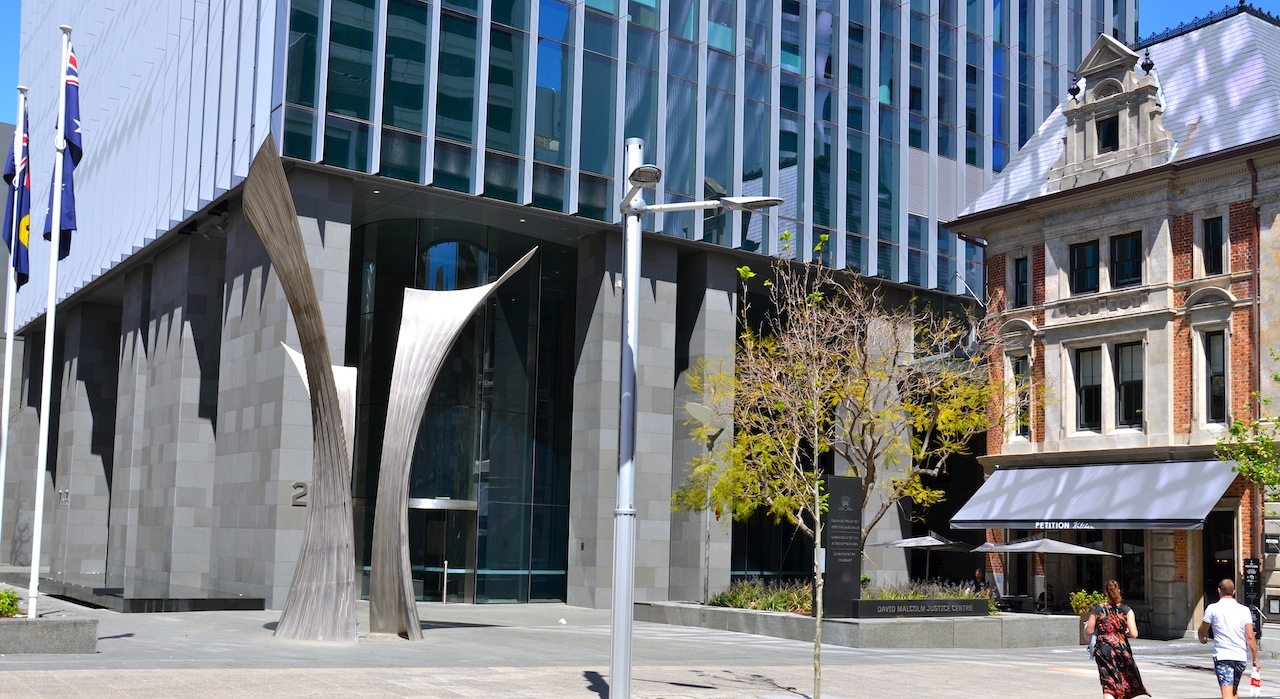
With state buildings to the south

== See also ==
- Chief Justice of Western Australia
- List of Judges of the Supreme Court of Western Australia
- Judiciary of Australia

== General references ==
- "History". Supreme Court of Western Australia. 19 July 2012.
- History of the Supreme Court of Western Australia (PDF), Supreme Court of Western Australia, 15 October 2008
