= R v Clarke =

Judgement of the High Court of Australia

- Court: High Court of Australia
- Decided: 22 November 1927
- Citations: [1927] HCA 47, (1927) 40 CLR 227

Case history
- Prior actions: Clarke v R [1927] WALawRp 12, (1927) 29 WALR 102
- Appealed from: Supreme Court (Full Court) (WA)

Court membership
- Judges sitting: Isaacs ACJ, Higgins, Starke JJ

Case opinions
- In order to create a contract it is necessary to show that he acted on the faith of or in reliance upon the promises.

R v Clarke, is court case decided by the High Court of Australia in the law of contract.

== Facts ==
Evan Clarke tried to claim the reward of £1000 for giving information that led to the conviction of a murderer, Treffene, of two policemen called Walsh and Pitman, under the Crown Suits Act 1898. A proclamation stated there would be such a reward, which he had seen in May. However, Clarke gave the information in June while he was on trial himself as an accessory for murder. He had originally covered for the murderer, but then had changed his mind and given information. The evidence was reported to be that he gave information to clear himself and not necessarily for the reward. He told the police "exclusively in order to clear himself". It was uncertain whether he was thinking about the reward at the time he provided the information.

Evan Clarke proceeded, by petition of right under the Crown Suits Act 1898, to sue the Crown for £1,000 promised by proclamation for such information as should lead to the arrest and conviction of the person or persons who committed the murders of two police officers, Walsh and Pitman. In the Supreme Court of Western Australia, the Trial Judge, McMillan CJ dismissed the claim, holding that Clarke did not rely upon the offer nor did he intend to enter into a contract, stating Clarke "never was and never intended to be an informer. He only told the truth after his arrest in order to save himself from the unfounded charge of murder". Clarke appealed to the Full Court and the majority, Burnside and Draper JJ, upheld the appeal, holding that a contract was created because Clarke had fulfilled the conditions mentioned in the offer. Northmore J dissented on the bases that (1) Clarke's evidence was that when he gave the information he had no intention of claiming the reward and (2) the offer was to the first person to give information leading to the arrest and conviction. As one of the murderers, Treffene, was arrested at the same time as Clarke and thus he had not met the conditions of the offer.

== Judgment ==
The High Court held that Clarke could not claim the reward because it was necessary to act in "reliance on" an offer in order to accept it, and therefore create a contract. Isaacs ACJ and Starke J held that Clarke had not intended to accept the offer. Higgins J interpreted the evidence to say that Clarke had forgotten about the offer of the reward.....

Isaacs ACJ said the following.

The information for which Clarke claims the reward was given by him when he was under arrest with Treffene on a charge of murder, and was given by him in circumstances which show that in giving the information he was not acting on or in pursuance of or in reliance upon or in return for the consideration contained in the proclamation, but exclusively in order to clear himself from a false charge of murder. In other words, he was acting with reference to a specific criminal charge against himself, and not with reference to a general request by the community for information against other persons. It is true that without his information and evidence no conviction was probable, but it is also abundantly clear that he was not acting for the sake of justice or from any impulse of conscience or because he was asked to do so, but simply and solely on his own initiative, to secure his own safety from the hand of the law and altogether irrespective of the proclamation. He has, in my opinion, neither a legal nor a moral claim to the reward. The learned Chief Justice held that Clarke never accepted or intended to accept the offer in the proclamation, and, unless the mere giving of the information without such intention amounted in law to an acceptance of the offer or to performance of the condition, there was neither "acceptance" nor "performance," and therefore there was no contract. I do not understand either of the learned Judges who formed the majority to controvert this. But they held that Williams v Carwardine has stood so long that it should be regarded as accurate, and that, so regarded, it entitled the respondent to judgment. As reported in the four places where it is found, it is a difficult case to follow. I cannot help thinking that it is somewhat curtly reported. When the various reports in banc are compared, there are some discrepancies. But two circumstances are important. One is the pregnant question of Denman C.J. as to the plaintiff's knowledge of the handbill. The question appears in the reports in Carrington & Payne and in Nevile & Manning, but is omitted from the report in Barnewall & Adolphus. The other circumstance is the stress placed on motive. The Lord Chief Justice clearly attached importance to the answer given to his question. He, doubtless, finally drew the inference that, having knowledge of the request in the handbill, the plaintiff at last determined to accede, and did accede, to that request, and so acted in response to it, although moved thereto by the incentive supplied by her stings of conscience. Making allowance for what is in all probability an abridged report of what was actually said, I cannot help thinking, on the whole, that not only Denman C.J. but also some at least of the other members of the Court considered that the motive of the informant was not inconsistent with, and did not in that case displace, the prima facie inference arising from the fact of knowledge of the request and the giving of the information it sought. Motive, though not to be confused with intention, is very often strong evidence of that state of mind, both in civil and criminal matters. The evidentiary force of motive in the circumstances of Williams v Carwardine is no criterion of its force in the circumstances of any other case, and it can never usurp the legal place of intention. If the decision in Williams v Carwardine went no further than I have said, it is in line with the acknowledged and settled theories of contract. If it goes so far as is contended for by the respondent, I am of opinion that it is opposed to unimpeachable authority, and I agree with the suggestion of Sir Frederick Pollock, in the preface to vol. 38 of the Revised Reports, that it should be disregarded. It is unquestionable—putting aside what are called formal contracts or quasi-contracts—that to create a contractual obligation there must be both offer and acceptance. It is the union of these which constitutes the binding tie, the obligatio. The present type of case is no exception. It is not true to say that since such an offer calls for information of a certain description, then, provided only information of that description is in fact given, the informant is entitled to the reward. That is not true unless the word "given" is interpreted as "given in exchange for the offer"—in other words, given in performance of the bargain which is contemplated by the offer and of which the offer is intended to form part. Performance in that case is the implied method of acceptance, and it simultaneously effects the double purpose of acceptance and performance. But acceptance is essential to contractual obligation, because without it there is no agreement, and in the absence of agreement, actual or imputed, there can be no contract. Lord Kinnear in Jackson v Broatch said: "It is an excellent definition of a contract that it is an agreement which produces an obligation."

[...]

I may here refer to a weighty American authority, that of Shaw C.J. in Loring v City of Boston. At p. 411 the learned Chief Justice said of an action to recover a reward offered for the conviction of an incendiary:—"There is now no question of the correctness of the legal principle on which this action is founded. The offer of a reward for the detection of an offender, the recovery of property, and the like, is an offer or proposal, which anyone, capable of performing the service, may accept at any time before it is revoked, and perform the service; and such offer on one side, and acceptance and performance ... on the other, is a valid contract made on good consideration, which the law will enforce." In the case then before the Court the offer was published more than three years before the information relied on was given, and in the circumstances the Court held the offer had ceased to operate. The important matter, however, is that the Court, in nonsuiting the plaintiff, said: "We are therefore of opinion, that the offer of the City had ceased before the plaintiffs accepted and acted upon it as such, and that consequently no contract existed upon which this action, founded on an alleged express promise, can be maintained." The reasoning quoted seems to me to be as exact and as modern as that in Carlill's Case, and to be hardly capable of advantageous alteration.

Higgins J agreed and said the following.

It must be clearly understood, however, that we, as a Court, have no responsibility for the policy of the Government in resisting this claim. As the Chief Justice of the Supreme Court has said, Clarke gave evidence which was of the greatest value to the Crown in the prosecution of Coulter and Treffene, and without that evidence there would have been no case which could have been left to the jury against them. The refusal of the Crown to pay the reward in this case is likely to weaken the efficacy of such a bait when the Crown seeks information from accessories to crimes hereafter.

Clarke cannot succeed in this action unless he can establish a contract between the Crown and himself. I think that there was no contract....

One of the murderers, Treffene, was arrested on 6th June, with Clarke; the other, Coulter, was arrested on 10th June; both were indicted in August and convicted in September of the murder of Walsh; there was an appeal to the Court of Criminal Appeal, which failed; and, after the failure of the appeal, Clarke, on the suggestion of Inspector Condon, for the first time thought of the reward and decided to claim it. But he had seen the proclamation in May. On 6th June, Clarke gave false information in order to screen the murderers; and, as he says, "I had no intention then of doing anything to earn the reward. ... On 10th June, I began to break down under the strain. Manning took down my statement on 10th June at my request. I had no thought whatever then of the reward that had been offered. My object was my own protection against a false charge of murder. ... Up to 10th June I had no intention of doing anything to earn the reward. At the inquest" (where he gave evidence without asking to be allowed to give evidence) "I was committed for trial as an accessory. ... When I gave evidence in the Criminal Court I had no intention of claiming the reward. I first decided to claim the reward a few days after the appeal had been dealt with. Inspector Condon told me to make application. I had not intended to apply for the reward up to that date. I did not know exactly the position I was in. Up to that time I had not considered the position ... I had not given the matter consideration at all. My motive was to clear myself of the charge of murder. I gave no consideration and formed no intention with regard to the reward."

[...]

It should be noted in this connection that the great judgment of Lord Blackburn in Brogden v Metropolitan Railway Co is addressed to the other condition of contract, that acceptance must be communicated; but the whole judgment assumes that consensus of mind pre-existed—"simple acceptance in your own mind, without any intimation to the other party, and expressed by a mere private act, such as putting a letter into a drawer," does not complete a contract (and see per Lord Cairns LC). The reasoning of Woodruff J. in Fitch v Snedaker seems to me to be faultless; and the decision is spoken of in Anson (p. 24) as being undoubtedly correct in principle:—"The motive inducing consent may be immaterial, but the consent is vital. Without that there is no contract. How then can there be consent or assent to that of which the party has never heard?" Clarke had seen the offer, indeed; but it was not present to his mind—he had forgotten it, and gave no consideration to it, in his intense excitement as to his own danger. There cannot be assent without knowledge of the offer; and ignorance of the offer is the same thing whether it is due to never hearing of it or to forgetting it after hearing. But for this candid confession of Clarke's it might fairly be presumed that Clarke, having once seen the offer, acted on the faith of it, in reliance on it; but he has himself rebutted that presumption....

My view is that Clarke did not act on the faith of, in reliance upon, the proclamation; and that although the exact fulfilment of the conditions stated in the proclamation would raise a presumption that Clarke was acting on the faith of, in reliance upon, the proclamation, that presumption is rebutted by his own express admission....

Starke J said "the performance of some of the conditions required by the offer also establishes prima facie an acceptance of the offer." But here it was held that the evidence showed, Mr Clarke had not relied on the offer. So a presumption that conduct which appeared to be an acceptance was relying on an offer was displaced. The defendant was ruled not entitled to a government reward of 1000 pounds for information about the murderers of two police officers when at the time the information was given.

== See also ==
- Carlill v Carbolic Smoke Ball Company [1892] EWCA Civ 1
- Williams v Carwardine [1833] EWHC KB J44
- Gibbons v Proctor [1891] 64 LT 594
