= Lawrence Jackson (disambiguation) =

Lawrence Jackson (born 1985) is an American football player.

Lawrence Jackson may also refer to:

- Lawrence Jackson (guard) (born 1964), American football offensive lineman
- Lawrence Jackson (judge) (1914–1993), Australian jurist
- Lawrence Jackson (photographer), American photojournalist
- Lawrence Jackson (priest) (1926–2002), British priest
- Lawrence Jackson (rower) (1907–1937), New Zealand rower
- Lawrence Stanley Jackson (1884–1974), Australian Taxation Commissioner
- Lawrence Colvile Jackson (1851–1905), British barrister and colonial judge

== See also ==
- Laurence Jackson (1900–1984), Scottish curler.
