= Stephen Stanley Parker =

Early settler, pioneer and politician of Western Australia

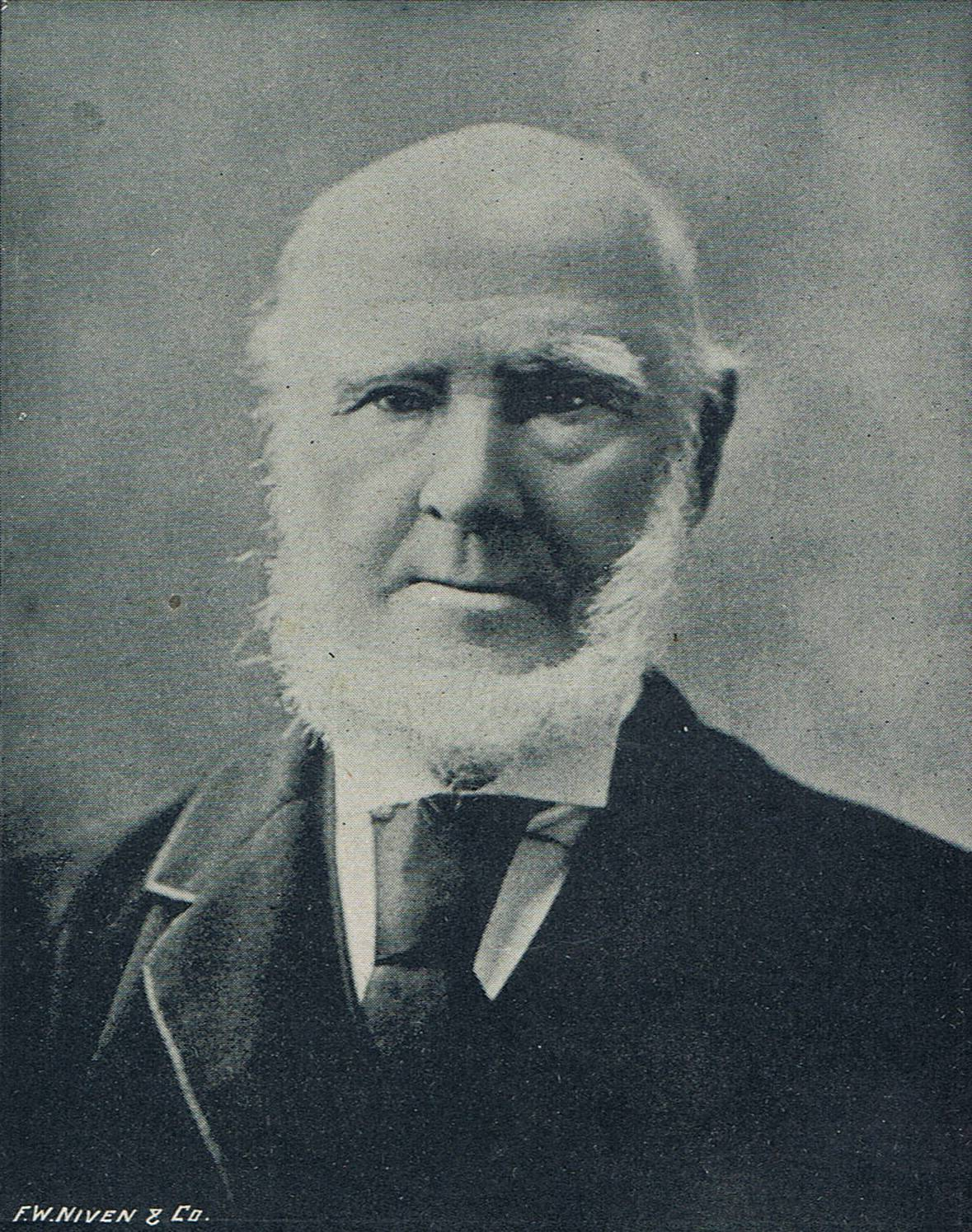
- Born: 24 May 1817; Lyminge, Kent, England
- Died: 1904 (aged 86–87); Perth, Western Australia, Australia
- Occupations: Landowner; Politician
- Children: Stephen Henry Parker
- Parent: Stephen Parker

Stephen Stanley Parker (1817 – 1904) was an early settler and pioneer of Western Australia and a member of the Western Australian Legislative Council.

== Biography ==
=== Early life ===
Parker was born on 24 May 1817 in Lyminge, Kent. He came to the Swan River Colony with his father Stephen Parker and his family, in February 1830. His father had intended to be associated with land dealings with Thomas Peel on behalf of some English investors. However, these did not come to fruition and instead he took up a land grant in Guildford, Western Australia. After several years, the family moved to York, Western Australia, where they established a 1,000 hectares (2,500 acres) property called Northbourne.

=== Career ===
He started his adult life as a landowner. He purchased a 4,000-acre (16 km^{2}) property in York, which proved highly lucrative. From there, he acquired several other leases in the York district and, in 1858, established a flour mill in the town.

In the 1860s, he was made a justice of the peace by Governor Sir Frederick Weld. Parker was, for eight years, the chairman of the Roads Board and was a member of the town council. In (about) 1874, he was appointed as a nominee member of the Legislative Council by Governor Sir William Robinson and held the position for eight years. He retired in February 1882 and moved to Perth to live.

After his retirement, he became a member of the Aborigines Protection Board and was a trustee of the Church of England diocese in Western Australia.

=== Personal life and death ===
He married Elizabeth Sewell in 1844. Their son, Stephen Henry Parker (1846–1927), served as the chief justice of the Supreme Court of Western Australia from 1906 to 1914.

He died in 1904.
