= Eremophila macmillaniana =

Scientific classification
- Kingdom: Plantae
- Clade: Embryophytes
- Clade: Tracheophytes
- Clade: Spermatophytes
- Clade: Angiosperms
- Clade: Eudicots
- Clade: Asterids
- Order: Lamiales
- Family: Scrophulariaceae
- Genus: Eremophila
- Species: E. macmillaniana

Binomial name
- Eremophila macmillaniana C.A.Gardner

Species of flowering plant

Eremophila macmillaniana, commonly known as grey turpentine bush, is a flowering plant in the figwort family, Scrophulariaceae and is endemic to Western Australia. It is an erect shrub with broad, grey leaves and cream-coloured or pink flowers with red or purple spots on the outside.

== Description ==
Eremophila macmillaniana is a shrub or small tree growing to a height of up to 4 m (10 ft). The leaves and branches are covered with a layer of matted grey hairs that gradually become saturated with resin and are then difficult to see. The leaves are arranged alternately along the branches and are clustered near the ends of them. They are oblong to lance-shaped, tapering towards the ends and are mostly 23–54 mm (0.9–2 in) long, 5.5–15 mm (0.2–0.6 in) wide and often rough or wrinkled.

The flowers are borne singly in leaf axils on a grey, hairy stalk which is 7.5–14.5 mm (0.3–0.6 in) long. There are 5 overlapping, pale reddish-purple, lance-shaped sepals which are 18–32 mm (0.7–1 in) long. The petals are 25–32.5 mm (0.98–1.3 in) long and are joined at their lower end to form a tube. The petal tube is pink or cream-coloured with red to purple spots on the outside. The inside and outside surfaces of the tube and petal lobes are mostly glabrous, except that the middle of the lower lobe and the inside of the petal tube are covered with hairs. The 4 stamens extend slightly beyond the end of the petal tube. Flowering occurs from June to September and the fruits which follow are dry, woody, oval-shaped with a tapering end and are 6.5–11 mm (0.3–0.4 in) long.

== Taxonomy and naming ==
Eremophila macmillaniana was first formally described in 1864 by Charles Gardner in Journal of the Royal Society of Western Australia. The specific epithet (macmillaniana) honours Sir Robert Furse McMillan, Chief Justice of the Supreme Court of Western Australia from 1913 to 1931.

== Distribution and habitat ==
Grey turpentine bush is widespread and common in the area between Meekatharra, Yalgoo and the Kennedy Range in the Carnarvon, Gascoyne and Murchison biogeographic regions. It grows in sandy or rocky soil on stony plains and hills.

== Conservation status ==
Eremophila macmillaniana is classified as "not threatened" by the Western Australian Government Department of Parks and Wildlife.
