= Albert Wolff (judge) =

Australian judge (1899–1977)

Sir Albert Asher Wolff KCMG (30 April 1899 – 27 October 1977) was a Chief Justice of the Supreme Court of Western Australia, which is the highest ranking court in the Australian State of Western Australia. Wolff also served as Lieutenant Governor of Western Australia.

== Early life ==
Born on 30 April 1899 at Geraldton, Western Australia, and registered as Asher Albert, he was the only son and second of four children to a Russian-born jeweller, and his English wife. From an orthodox Jewish family, Wolff was educated at Geraldton State and Perth Boys' schools and won a scholarship to Perth Modern School.

In 1924 he married schoolteacher Ida Violet Jackson, at the district registrar's office in Perth.

== Judiciary career ==
After serving articles in a legal firm, he was admitted to the Supreme Court on 20 October 1921, and practised at Goomalling and in Perth until appointed crown prosecutor in 1926.

Wolff prosecuted constables J. G. St Jack and R. H. Regan for murder following the 1926 Forrest River massacre; they were acquitted. In 1929 he was promoted crown solicitor and parliamentary draftsman and won repute for his drafting skills. He was appointed to the supreme court bench in 1938.

In 1949 Wolff presided over an air court of inquiry into the crash of a Douglas DC-3 aircraft at Perth Airport which killed all 18 people on board. The aircraft was operated by Western Australian airline MacRobertson Miller Aviation. The court was unable to determine the precise cause of the accident.

Wolff became senior puisne justice in 1954. In February 1959 he succeeded John Dwyer as chief justice and became deputy president of the State Arbitration Court; he was knighted via KCMG in June.

Wolff was also committed to capital punishment. One of his most contentious criminal cases was the 1961 murder trial of the deaf mute Darryl Raymond Beamish. Wolff pronounced the death sentence, which was later commuted to life imprisonment. In 2005 the conviction was quashed after the emergence of fresh evidence.

Wolff presided over a royal commission into youth unemployment and the apprenticeship system. He recommended improving literacy at the primary level, raising the school leaving age to 15, and reviewing policy and funding for technical education. By singling out the building industry for inadequate training regulations he hastened the passage of the Builders' Registration Act (1939).

Wolff retired from the position of chief justice on 30 April 1969. He served as Lieutenant Governor of Western Australia from 1968 until 1974.

== Later life and death ==
Wolff died on 27 October 1977 at the Home of Peace, Subiaco, and was buried in the Jewish Orthodox section of Karrakatta Cemetery after a State funeral.

== See also ==
- Judiciary of Australia

Legal offices
Preceded by Sir John Dwyer	Chief Justice of Western Australia; 1959–1969	Succeeded by Sir Lawrence Jackson
