= HMS Duncan (F80) =

1958 Type 14 or Blackwood-class frigate of the Royal Navy

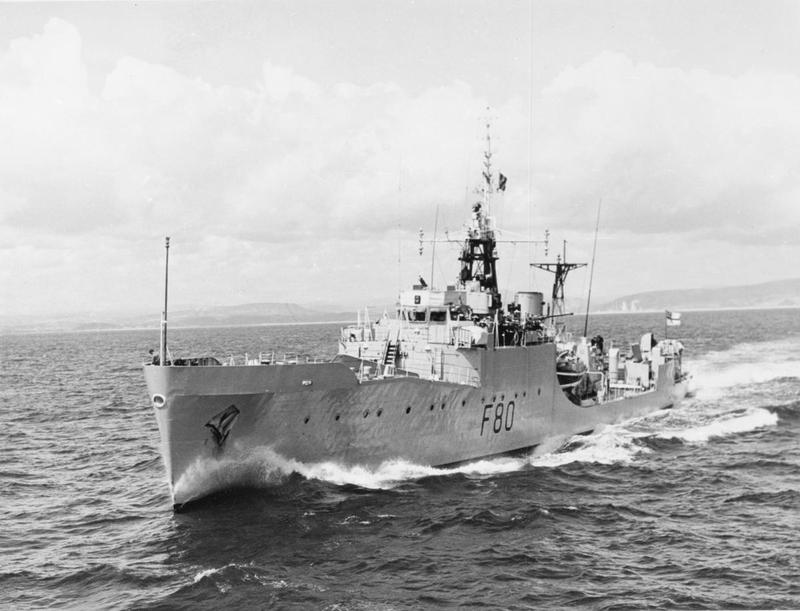
- HMS Duncan, July 1968 (IWM)

History

United Kingdom
- Name: HMS Duncan
- Namesake: Adam Duncan
- Builder: John I. Thornycroft & Company
- Laid down: 17 December 1953
- Launched: 30 May 1957
- Acquired: October 1958
- Commissioned: 21 October 1958
- Decommissioned: 1984
- Identification: Pennant number: F80
- Motto: Secundis dubusque rectus; ("Upright in prosperity and peril")
- Fate: Broken up February 1985
- Badge: On a Field Red, a hunting horn Silver

General characteristics
- Class & type: Blackwood-class frigate
- Displacement: 1,456 tons (1,479 tonnes) full load
- Length: 310 ft (94 m)
- Beam: 33 ft (10 m)
- Draught: 15 ft (4.6 m)
- Propulsion: Y-100 plant; 2 × Babcock & Wilcox boilers; steam turbines on single shaft; 15,000 shp (11 MW)
- Speed: 27 knots (50 km/h)
- Range: 5,200 nautical miles (9,630 km) at 12 knots (22 km/h)
- Complement: 112
- Sensors & processing systems: Radar Type 974 navigation; Sonar Type 174 search; Sonar Type 162 target classification; Sonar Type 170 targeting
- Armament: 3 × 40 mm Bofors gun Mark 7 (quarterdeck mount later removed); 2 × Limbo Mark 10 anti-submarine mortars

HMS Duncan, launched in 1957, was the fifth RN ship named after Admiral Adam Duncan. She was a Blackwood-class frigate of the Royal Navy that served in the Cod Wars.

== Service ==
From her first commissioning in 1958 until 1965 Duncan was the leader of the Fishery Protection Squadron. She was involved in the First Cod War between United Kingdom and Iceland over fishing rights, intervening between the Icelandic coastguard and British trawlers.

She was an escort to the royal yacht Britannia in August 1960. Between 1960 and 1962 her captain was George Cunningham Leslie. From 1962 until 1964 her captain was Richard Trowbridge, who was later promoted to Rear Admiral and served as Flag Officer, Royal Yachts from 1970 until 1975, and in retirement as Governor of Western Australia from 1980 to 1983.

In 1964 Duncan fired the salute at the opening of the new Forth Road Bridge. She was given the Freedom of the city of Hull for the part the vessel played in the Cod Wars. In 1966 she completed a long refit and modernisation of all her sonar and anti-submarine equipment at Rosyth Naval Dockyard, and then became employed mainly in anti-submarine training duties, first in the Londonderry Squadron and then from 1969 in the Portland Training Squadron. In 1967 she attended Portsmouth Navy Days.

Sir Robin Knox-Johnson, who in 1968 was the first person to perform a single-handed non-stop circumnavigation of the Earth while also winning the Sunday Times Golden Globe Race, was a watch-keeping and communications officer on Duncan from January to April of that year.

In 1970 Duncan was again present at Portsmouth Navy Days, as part of the Portland Training Squadron. On 2 April 1971, Duncan paid off from the Portland Training Squadron.

During the early 1980s, Duncan served alongside the frigate Eastbourne as harbour training ship at Rosyth Dockyard for the marine engineering artificer apprentices from the shore base HMS Caledonia.

== Publications ==
- Colledge, J. J.; Warlow, Ben (2006) [1969]. Ships of the Royal Navy: The Complete Record of All Fighting Ships of the Royal Navy from the 15th Century to the Present (3rd Rev ed.). London: Chatham Publishing. ISBN 978-1-86176-281-8. OCLC 67375475.
- Marriott, Leo (1983). Royal Navy Frigates 1945-1983. Ian Allan Ltd. ISBN 07110 1322 5.
