= Gibbons v Proctor =

- Decided: 1891
- Citation: 64 LT 594; 55 JP 616

Keywords
- Contract law

Gibbons v Proctor [1891] 64 LT 594 (also reported as Gibson v Proctor 55 JP 616), is an English contract law case that deals with an offer, via advertisement, and whether or not a person who did not know of the offer can accept the offer if he completes the conditions of the offer.

== Facts ==
The police put up an advertisement stating that they would pay for information leading to the arrest of a criminal. The advertisement stipulated that the information must be given to the Superintendent. A police officer asked a colleague to forward some useful information to the Superintendent but he was not aware of the offer at the time when he spoke with his colleague. Before the information reached the Superintendent, the police officer became aware of the offer. It was held that the officer was entitled to claim the reward.

== Judgment ==
In This case, it was held that advertisements which offer a reward for information which leads to the arrest or conviction of the perpetrator of a crime are to be treated as offers, as the intention to be bound is inferred from the fact that no further bargaining is expected to result from them.

The case is sometimes wrongly cited as authority for the proposition that acceptance in ignorance of an offer is effective. A better authority for this proposition is the Australian case of R v Clarke. This case is a weak authority for this proposition because the party claiming reward possessed full knowledge of the offer by the time the offer was accepted; in cases such as this, acceptance is only effective when the prescribed action had been completed, i.e. when information reaches the offeror.

== See also ==
- Williams v Carwardine
- R v Clarke
