= Wayne Martin (judge) =

Chief Justice of Western Australia

The Honourable Wayne Martin AC KC
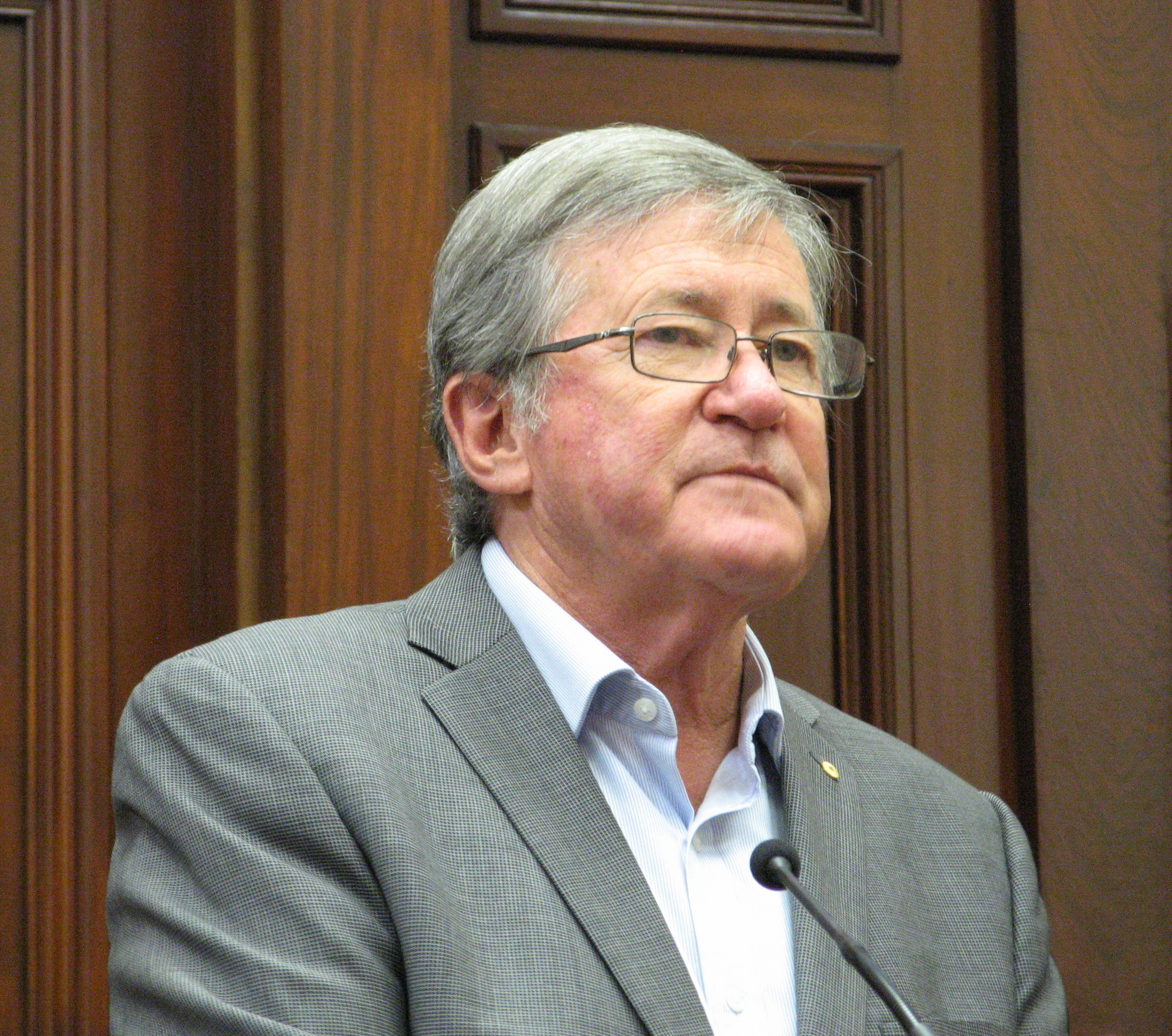

Lieutenant-Governor of Western Australia
- In office 9 October 2009 – 27 November 2019
- Monarch: Elizabeth II
- Governor: Ken Michael; Malcolm McCusker; Kerry Sanderson; Kim Beazley
- Preceded by: David Malcolm
- Succeeded by: Peter Quinlan

Chief Justice of Western Australia
- In office 1 May 2006 – 27 July 2018
- Nominated by: Alan Carpenter
- Appointed by: Ken Michael
- Preceded by: David Malcolm
- Succeeded by: Peter Quinlan

Personal details
- Born: 28 December 1952 (age 73) Perth, Western Australia
- Education: University of Western Australia; King's College London; Christ Church Grammar School

Wayne Stewart Martin AC KC (born 28 December 1952) is a lawyer and former judge who served as Chief Justice of Western Australia from 2006 until 2018, and Lieutenant-Governor of Western Australia from 2009 to 2019.

== Early life and education ==
Martin was born on 28 December 1952 and attended North Perth Primary School, Coolbinia Primary School and Christ Church Grammar School. He graduated from the University of Western Australia in 1973, with a Bachelor of Laws and First Class Honours. Martin completed his articled clerkship with Lavan & Walsh, and subsequently completed a Master of Laws degree at King's College London. He was admitted to practice in Western Australia in 1977, and was a partner of the law firm Keall Brinsden (now Corrs Chambers Westgarth) until joining the independent bar in 1988. He was made a QC in 1993.

== Legal career ==
In addition to his work as a barrister, Martin is a former chairman of the Western Australian Law Reform Commission, president of the Administrative Review Council, and president of the Western Australia Bar Association. In addition, he is a former president of the Law Society of Western Australia and a director of the Law Council of Australia.

== Judicial career ==
As Chief Justice, Martin spoke out about the need to enhance access to justice and improve the efficiency of the legal system. He also came to the defence of the legal system in the wake of criticisms in some sections of the media that resulted from several high-profile miscarriages of justice.

Martin instigated several changes to modernise the courts in Western Australia, including abolishing the traditional wigs and jabots, publishing sentencing comments online, and allowing the use of electronic devices and social media when covering court cases.

In his role as Lieutenant-Governor, he has served as Administrator of the State on two occasions when the position of Governor of Western Australia is vacant: from 2 May to 1 July 2011, following the expiration of Ken Michael's term, and from 1 July 2014 to October 2014, following the expiration of Malcolm McCusker's term.

Martin retired in July 2018.

He has served as an international commercial court judge on the DIFC Courts in Dubai.

== Board member ==
Martin became a West Australian Football Commission board member in 2019 before being elected chairman in 2020 and then reappointed on a three-year term in December 2021. His tenure as chair will conclude on 31 December 2024.

== Honours ==
On 11 June 2012, Chief Justice Martin was named a Companion of the Order of Australia for "eminent service to the judiciary and to the law, particularly as Chief Justice of the Supreme Court of Western Australia, to legal reform and education, and to the community".

== See also ==
- Judiciary of Australia

Legal offices
Preceded by David Malcolm	Chief Justice of Western Australia; 2006 - 2018	Succeeded by Peter Quinlan
