= Kerry Sanderson =

32nd Governor of Western Australia

The Honourable Kerry Sanderson AC CVO
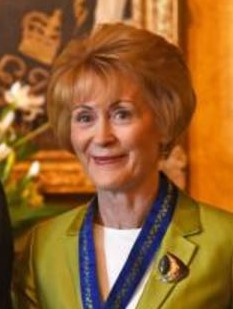

32nd Governor of Western Australia
- In office 20 October 2014 – 1 May 2018
- Monarch: Elizabeth II
- Premier: Colin Barnett; Mark McGowan
- Lieutenant Governor: Wayne Martin
- Preceded by: Malcolm McCusker
- Succeeded by: Kim Beazley

Agent-General for Western Australia
- In office November 2008 – December 2011
- Preceded by: Noel Ashcroft
- Succeeded by: Kevin Skipworth

Personal details
- Born: Kerry Gaye Smith; 21 December 1950 (age 75) Subiaco, Western Australia, Australia
- Education: University of Western Australia

Kerry Gaye Sanderson, AC, CVO (née Smith; born 21 December 1950) is a retired Australian public servant and business director, who served as the 32nd Governor of Western Australia, in office from 20 October 2014 to 1 May 2018. She is the first woman to have held the position. She has since served as Chancellor of Edith Cowan University for 2019–2021.

Sanderson attended Churchlands Senior High School and the University of Western Australia. She entered the public service after graduation, serving in senior positions in the Treasury and Transport Departments of the Government of Western Australia. Sanderson was chief executive officer of Fremantle Ports from 1991 to 2008. In the position, she undertook a restructuring of the operations of Fremantle Harbour, and was credited with increasing the port's efficiency and returning it to profit.

After leaving Fremantle Ports, Sanderson was named Agent-General for Western Australia for a three-year term (from 2008 to 2011), representing the government in the United Kingdom and Europe. On her return to Australia, she entered the private sector, holding board-level positions with several publicly traded companies. She was appointed to succeed Malcolm McCusker as Governor of Western Australia in August 2014.

== Early life and public service ==
From Perth, Western Australia, Sanderson was raised in the city's western suburbs, attending Wembley Primary School and Churchlands Senior High School. She later graduated from the University of Western Australia with Bachelor of Science and Bachelor of Economics degrees, with a mathematics concentration. After graduation, she worked in a computing job for a period of time, but subsequently switched to the public service. Sanderson worked for the Government of Western Australia's Department of Treasury for 17 years, including as director of the economic and financial policy division, and was then deputy director-general of the Department of Transport for four years, becoming "one of the state’s most senior and well-regarded bureaucrats". She and her husband Lancelot John (Lance) Sanderson had two sons; he died in 2007.

=== Fremantle Ports ===
In October 1991, Sanderson was named acting general manager of Fremantle Ports, a publicly owned state government trading enterprise (GTE) responsible for Fremantle Harbour and attached facilities in Cockburn Sound. She was appointed chief executive officer in 1992, and was re-appointed for another five years in November 1997, going on to continue in the position until October 2008. As CEO, Sanderson was credited with "turning Australia's most inefficient port into its fastest", despite "prejudice against her gender, and the reputation of Australia's waterfront for being notoriously slack". She re-organised the company along total quality management principles and began charging fees based on cargo volume instead of time in port, with the company subsequently going from a A$37-million loss in 1990–91 to a profit three years later. She also re-negotiated with maritime unions, decreasing the number of industrial awards from 29 to six. Overall, Fremantle Ports more than tripled the value of its container throughput during Sanderson's time as CEO, with total movements (in tonnage) growing by 56 percent. Her replacement as CEO was Chris Leatt-Hayter, who was previously general manager strategic and commercial development.

=== Agent-General ===
In July 2008, Sanderson was named Agent-General for Western Australia, replacing Noel Ashcroft. Appointed by Governor Ken Michael on the advice of Premier Alan Carpenter, she took up the role in November 2008, becoming the first female agent-general in Australia. The agent-general is based at Australia House, London, and, as head of the government's European Office, is primarily involved in promoting trade and investment, with some diplomatic functions. During her period as agent-general, Sanderson concentrated on attracting foreign investment and skilled immigrants to Western Australia, as well as promoting WA food and wine exports in European markets. She was also involved in promoting Australia's (successful) bid for the Square Kilometre Array, a radio telescope to be built near Boolardy. Sanderson left the position in December 2011, after her three-year term expired, and was replaced by Kevin Skipworth.

== Private sector ==
During her time as Fremantle Ports CEO, Sanderson had also served on the boards of Austrade and the Australian Wheat Board, as well as serving a term as president of Ports Australia, an industry group. However, under the Agent General Act 1895, she was prohibited from holding any private-sector positions during her period as agent-general. Shortly after finishing her stint as agent-general, Sanderson was named a non-executive director of Downer EDI, an engineering and infrastructure management firm. She was also named to the boards of St John of God Health Care (2012-2014) and Atlas Iron (2012-2014), as well as being on the board of government entities holding positions with a number of charities and non-profit organisations. Additionally, Sanderson was appointed an adjunct professor at Curtin University's business school in January 2013. She resigned from her corporate positions before the start of her term as governor.

After her term as governor, Sanderson was appointed to the board of St John of God Healthcare (Chair since May 2018) and been named to the board of the Western Australian Cricket Association (since 2021). She continues as a director of the WA Parks Foundation (inaugural chair since October 2016) as well as patron or ambassador of a number of not-for-profit entities.

== Governor ==
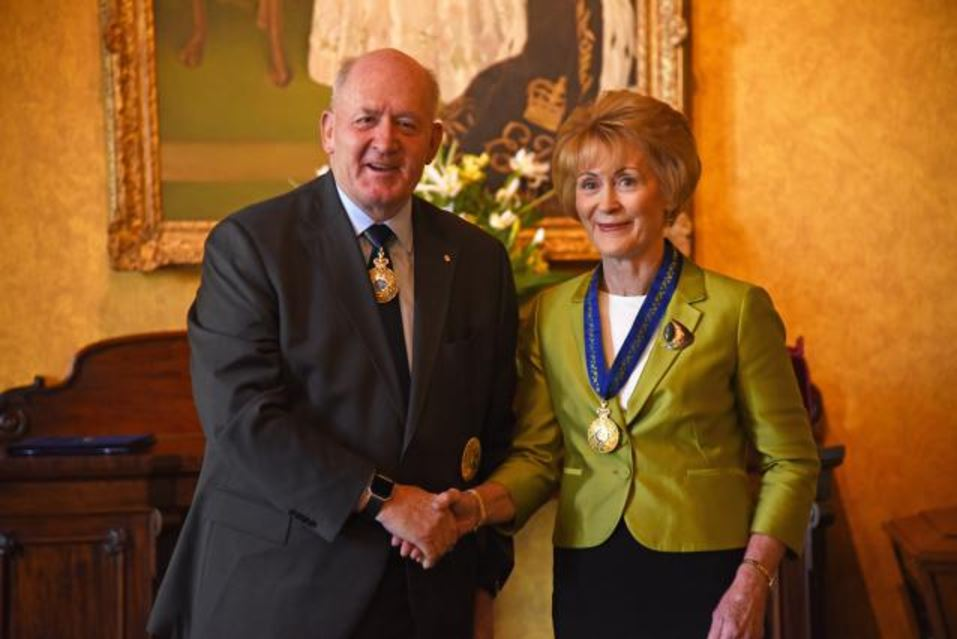
Sanderson being invested as a Companion of the Order of Australia (AC) by Peter Cosgrove, the Governor-General of Australia.

In August 2014, Colin Barnett, the Premier of Western Australia, announced that Queen Elizabeth II, Queen of Australia had approved Sanderson's nomination as the 32nd Governor of Western Australia, succeeding Malcolm McCusker whose term had expired on 30 June. Appointed for an initial three-year term, she was sworn in on 20 October, becoming the first woman to hold the position. During her time in office, Sanderson lived at Government House, Perth, the governor's official residence.

After the 2017 state election, Sanderson swore in her second premier, Mark McGowan of the Labor Party. In her speech at the opening of state parliament in May 2017, she broke convention by including personal commentary on a political matter, namely Western Australia's disproportionate share of goods and services tax (GST) revenue. Her official secretary confirmed that the material had been inserted into the speech on the initiative of the governor, rather than being composed by the cabinet as is usually the case.

On 3 April 2018, McGowan announced that former federal Labor leader and Australian Ambassador to the United States, Kim Beazley, would succeed Sanderson as governor upon the expiration of her term on 1 May 2018.

== Honours ==
Viceregal styles of Kerry Sanderson (2014–2018)
- Reference style: Her Excellency the Honourable
- Spoken style: Your Excellency

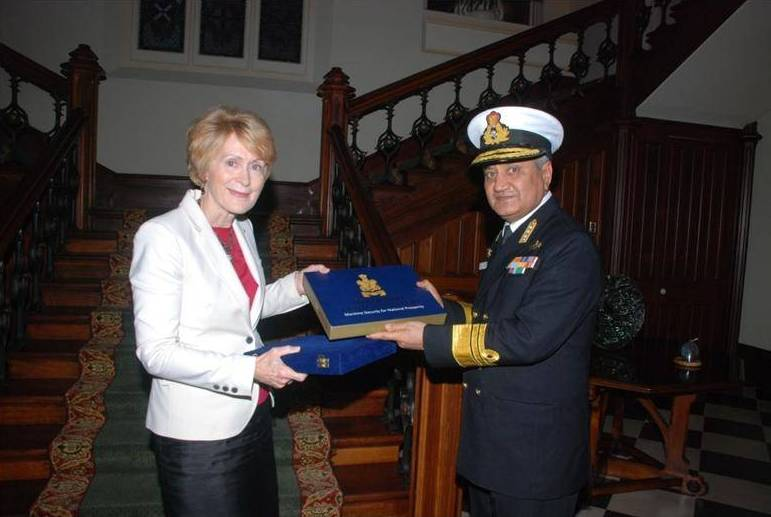
Sanderson receives a memento from Indian Navy Vice Admiral Satish Soni.

Orders

- 14 June 2004: Officer of the Order of Australia (AO) "For service to the development and management of the port and maritime industries in Australia, and to public sector governance in the areas of finance and transport in Western Australia"
- 13 June 2016: Companion of the Order of Australia (AC) "For eminent service to the people of Western Australia, to the promotion of international investment, scientific research and export opportunities, and through roles with maritime, mining, emergency management and not-for-profit organisations."
- 28 December 2019: Sanderson was appointed Commander of the Royal Victorian Order (CVO) in the 2020 New Year Honours for her services as Governor of Western Australia.

Medals

- 1 January 2001: Centenary Medal "For service to the maritime industry"

Organisations

- 1996: Telstra Business Woman of the Year (Western Australia)

=== Honorary degrees ===
- 2005: Doctor of Letters (University of Western Australia)
- 2015: Honorary Doctorate (Murdoch University)

Government offices
Preceded by Malcolm McCusker	Governor of Western Australia; 2014–2018	Succeeded by Kim Beazley
