= Michael Jeffery =

Australian governor-general and army officer (1937–2020)

Major General The Honourable Michael Jeffery AC, CVO, MC
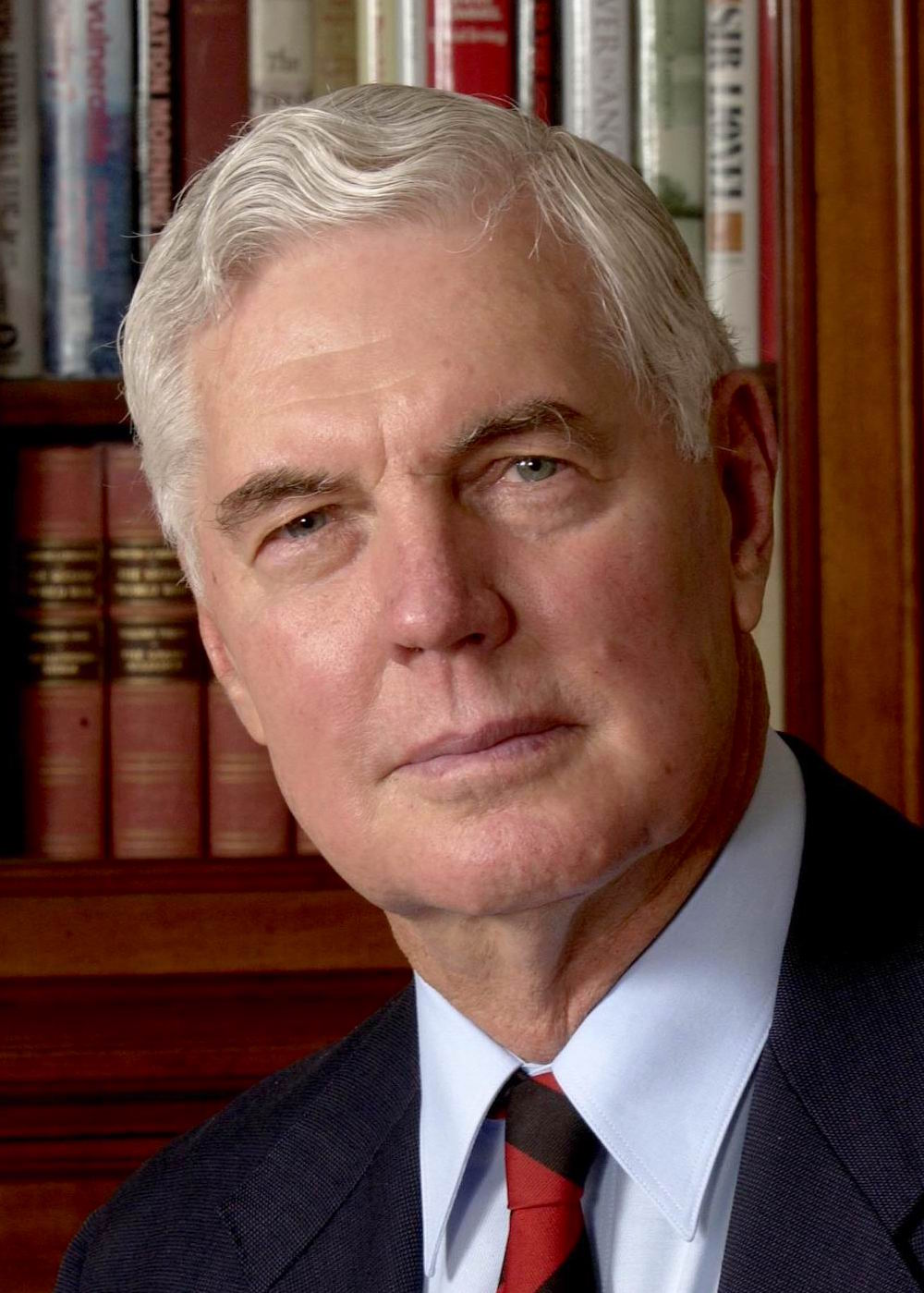
- Official portrait, 2003

24th Governor-General of Australia
- In office 11 August 2003 – 5 September 2008
- Monarch: Elizabeth II
- Prime Minister: John Howard; Kevin Rudd
- Preceded by: Peter Hollingworth
- Succeeded by: Dame Quentin Bryce

28th Governor of Western Australia
- In office 1 November 1993 – 17 August 2000
- Monarch: Elizabeth II
- Premier: Richard Court
- Preceded by: Sir Francis Burt
- Succeeded by: John Sanderson

Personal details
- Born: Philip Michael Jeffery; 12 December 1937 Wiluna, Western Australia, Australia
- Died: 18 December 2020 (aged 83) Canberra, Australian Capital Territory, Australia
- Spouse: Marlena Kerr
- Profession: Military officer

Military service
- Allegiance: Australia
- Branch/service: Australian Army
- Years of service: 1955–1993
- Rank: Major General
- Commands: Deputy Chief of the General Staff (1990); 1st Division (1986–88); 1st Brigade (1983–84); Special Air Service Regiment (1976–77); 2nd Battalion, Royal Pacific Islands Regiment (1974–75)
- Battles/wars: Indonesia-Malaysia confrontation Vietnam War
- Awards: Companion of the Order of Australia; Commander of the Royal Victorian Order; Military Cross

Major General Philip Michael Jeffery (12 December 1937 – 18 December 2020) was a senior Australian Army officer and vice-regal representative. He was the 28th governor of Western Australia from 1993 to 2000, and the 24th governor-general of Australia, serving from 2003 to 2008.

From Perth, Western Australia, Jeffery graduated from the Royal Military College, Duntroon, and served in the Malayan Emergency and the Vietnam War, being awarded the Military Cross during the latter conflict.

Jeffery was at various stages commander of the Special Air Service Regiment and the 1st Division, and subsequently Deputy Chief of General Staff, before retiring from active service in 1993. After serving for seven years as Governor of Western Australia, Jeffery was appointed Governor-General of Australia in 2003, following the resignation of Peter Hollingworth. He was the first career Australian Army officer to hold the position, and was succeeded by Quentin Bryce.

== Early life and military career ==
Jeffery was born in Wiluna, Western Australia, on 12 December 1937, and was educated at Kent Street Senior High School. At 16 he left Perth to attend the Royal Military College, Duntroon, in Canberra.

After graduating in 1958, he served in a number of junior positions before being posted to Malaya in 1962 for operational service. From 1966 to 1969 he served in Papua New Guinea. During this posting, he married Marlena Kerr of Sydney, with whom he had three sons and a daughter. This was followed by a tour of duty in the Vietnam War, during which he was awarded the Military Cross (MC).

In 1972, Jeffery was promoted to lieutenant colonel, commanding the 2nd Battalion of the Pacific Islands Regiment from 1974 to 1975. He assumed command of the Special Air Service Regiment (SASR) in Perth from 7 January 1976 until 22 October 1977, and was then promoted to colonel as the first Director of the Army's Special Action Forces in 1979.

From 1982 to 1983, Jeffery headed Australia's national counter-terrorist co-ordination authority. In 1985 he was promoted to major general, being appointed to command the 1st Division the following year. In 1990 he became Deputy Chief of the General Staff and in 1991 he was appointed Assistant Chief of the General Staff for Materiel.

Jeffery retired from the army in 1993, and was appointed to the ceremonial position of Honorary Colonel of the SASR.

== Career ==
=== Governor of Western Australia (1993–2000) ===
In November 1993, Jeffery was appointed Governor of Western Australia and in June 1996 he was appointed a Companion of the Order of Australia (AC). He was appointed a Commander of the Royal Victorian Order (CVO) on 1 April 2000.

During his seven years in the post he made a number of public statements of his conservative views on marriage, sex and education. He received some criticism from the Labor opposition and sections of the media for appearing to take positions on political issues.

=== Governor-General of Australia (2003–2008) ===
Following the resignation of Peter Hollingworth as Governor-General of Australia, Prime Minister John Howard announced on 22 June 2003 that he had chosen Jeffery to succeed Hollingworth. He was formally appointed by Elizabeth II, Queen of Australia and sworn in on 11 August 2003, becoming the first Australian career soldier to become governor-general.

Jeffrey has represented Australia at multiple royal weddings, including the Wedding of Frederik, Crown Prince of Denmark, and Mary Donaldson and the Wedding of Prince Charles and Camilla Parker Bowles.

In 2005, Jeffery became a co-patron of the private, non-profit Australia China Friendship and Exchange Association (ACFEA), founded by Chinese-Australian businessman Chau Chak Wing. The organization promoted bilateral and international dialogue, particularly between China and Australia, having established the annual Imperial Springs International Forum in 2014.

On 8 April 2005, Jeffery represented Australia at the funeral of Pope John Paul II.

In 2007, in his position as governor-general, Jeffery was appointed as the colonel-in-chief of the Royal Australian Army Medical Corps, succeeding the previous colonel-in-chief, Queen Elizabeth The Queen Mother.

Jeffery was the Chief Scout of Australia.

Jeffery left Yarralumla prior to the swearing-in of his successor, Quentin Bryce, the former Governor of Queensland. Bryce was sworn in on 5 September 2008.

=== Career after office ===
On 23 October 2012, at the National Farmers' Federation Congress in Canberra, Prime Minister Julia Gillard announced the appointment of Jeffery as Australia's first Advocate for Soil Health. Gillard noted that, as Governor-General, Jeffery had a passion for regional development and the future of our rural industries, a commitment he continued after leaving office. Prime Minister Tony Abbott extended Jeffery's appointment as the national Advocate for Soil Health until December 2014, indicating Jeffery would continue to raise public awareness of the role soil plays in underpinning sustainable productivity, delivering quality ecosystem services and helping to meet global challenges including food security and climate change.

In June 2020, Jeffery stepped down from this role, now the Patron of the Soil Cooperative Research Centre, due to illness.

== Honours and awards ==
Companion of the Order of Australia (AC) – Civil division	1996 Queen's Birthday Honours
Officer of the Order of Australia (AO) – Military division	1988 Queen's Birthday Honours
Member of the Order of Australia (AM) – Military division	1981 Queen's Birthday Honours
Commander of the Royal Victorian Order (CVO)	(2000)
Military Cross (MC)	(1971)
Knight of Grace of the Most Venerable Order of Saint John	15 April 1994
Australian Active Service Medal 1945–1975	with MALAYSIA, THAI-MALAY and VIETNAM clasps
General Service Medal	with BORNEO clasp
Vietnam Medal	
Australian Service Medal 1945–1975	with SE ASIA and PNG clasps
Centenary Medal	(awarded 2001)
Defence Force Service Medal with 4 clasps	35–39 years service
National Medal	with First Clasp – 25–35 years service to ...
Australian Defence Medal	
Service Medal of the Order of St John	
Papua New Guinea Independence Medal	(1977)
Vietnam Campaign Medal	
Pingat Jasa Malaysia	
Honorary Grand Companion of the Order of Logohu (GCL)	(2005)

Unit Award:

Vietnam Gallantry Cross;	8th Battalion, Royal Australian Regiment (1970)

== Personal life ==
Jeffery was a Christian. He died on 18 December 2020, at the age of 83.

Government offices
Preceded by Peter Hollingworth	Governor-General of Australia; 2003–2008	Succeeded by Dame Quentin Bryce
Preceded by Francis Burt	Governor of Western Australia; 1993–2000	Succeeded by John Sanderson
Military offices
Preceded by Major General Gordon Fitzgerald	Deputy Chief of the General Staff; 1990–1991	Succeeded by Major General John Grey
Preceded by Major General Adrian Clunies-Ross	Commander 1st Division; 1985–1988	Succeeded by Major General Arthur Fittock
