= Litigation before the judgment in Carlill v Carbolic Smoke Ball Co =

Carlill v Carbolic Smoke Ball Co
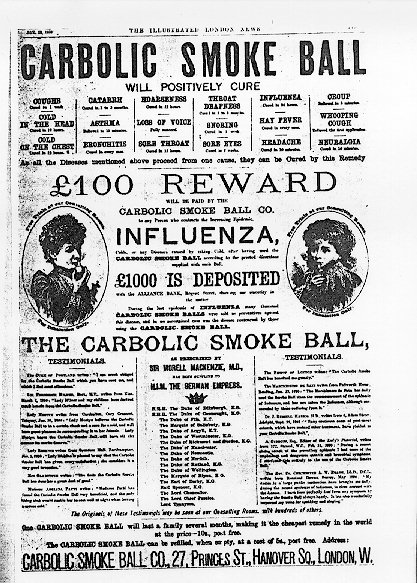
- Court: Court of Appeal (Civil Division)
- Full case name: Louisa Carlill v Carbolic Smoke Ball Company
- Decided: 7 December 1892
- Citation: [1893] 1 QB 256

Case history
- Prior action: Carlill v Carbolic Smoke Ball Co [1892] 2 QB 484 (QBD)
- Subsequent action: none

Case opinions
- Hawkins J

Keywords
- Advertisements, Conditions, Insurance, Offer and acceptance, Wagering contracts

The litigation before the judgment in Carlill v Carbolic Smoke Ball Company was a rather decorated affair, considering that a future Prime Minister served as counsel for the company. A close reading of the submissions and the decision in the Queen's Bench show that the result of the Court of Appeal was not inevitable or necessarily a decision on orthodox principles of previous case law.

For the facts and full final decision, see Carlill v Carbolic Smoke Ball Company.

== Queen's Bench ==
At first instance, on the 4th of July 1892, in the Queen's Bench, Hawkins J decided that Carlill was bound to recover £100. The facts were not in dispute. Submissions were made by both sides and then Hawkins J gave his judgment.

=== Counsels' submissions ===
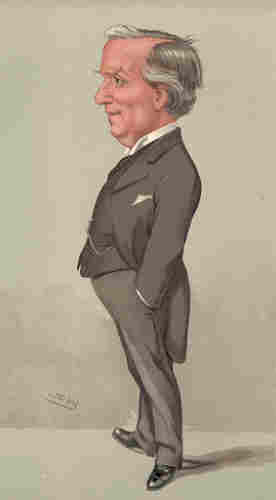
H. H. Asquith QC gave the leading submissions for the Carbolic company. In 1908 he became the Liberal Party's Prime Minister, and led Britain into World War I.

H. H. Asquith QC (the future Prime Minister) and Herman William Loehnis represented the Carbolic Smoke Ball Co. They made three submissions. Firstly, that there was no contract, because Carbolic had not intended to create an obligation enforceable by law upon themselves, shown by the wide terms in which the advertisement was expressed. The advertisement said the "reward" was for anyone getting influenza "after having used the ball", which could mean any time in someone's life. It would be absurd to impose an obligation on the company for some who got the flu years after using the ball. Moreover, contracting the flu was not something in the plaintiff's control, and so this case should be distinguished from reward cases like Williams v Carwardine where someone positively does something to deserve a reward. Second, even if a contract existed, it should be void because of the Gaming Act 1845, which said "wagering contracts" (gambling contracts) were unlawful and void. This was a wager, gambling, like a lottery, as in a number of cases, such as Brogden v Marriott Rourke v Short and Taylor v Smetten. Third, even if it were contract and not a wagering contract, it still would be void because it would be an insurance contract that failed to follow the prescribed form of stating people's names.

William Graham and John Patrick Murphy QC for Mrs Carlill responded to the submissions by first arguing that there was a contract. The contract was a warranty to prevent disease that sounded in liquidated (money) damages. The advertisement was an offer. It was accepted when the conditions of the offer were performed. This could be seen in Denton v Great Northern Ry. Co. and England v Davidson Second, it was not a wager contract, and therefore not void, because Thacker v Hardy said wagers are about one side winning and another losing. Here, even if Mrs Carlill did not "win" £100, Carbolic won nothing. Third, using the smokeball could not be an insurance policy, because it was not shaped as an insurance policy.

=== Judgment ===
Hawkins J (Sir Henry Hawkins) framed his decision through four questions:

1. Was there a contract?
2. If a contract, did it require a stamp?
3. Was it a wager?
4. Did insurance contract statutes apply?

To the last three questions, Hawkins essentially agreed with Mrs Carlill's counsel, and said "no", adding arguments of his own. To the question of whether there was a contract, he said "yes," and gave his reasons.

I am of opinion that the offer or proposal in the advertisement, coupled with the performance by the plaintiff of the condition, created a contract on the part of the defendants to pay the 100l. upon the happening of the event mentioned in the proposal. It seems to me that the contract may be thus described. In consideration that the plaintiff would use the carbolic smoke ball three times daily for two weeks according to printed directions supplied with the ball, the defendants would pay to her 100l. if after having so used the ball she contracted the epidemic known as influenza.

The advertisement inserted in the Pall Mall Gazette in large type was undoubtedly so inserted in the hope that it would be read by all who read that journal, and the announcement that 1000l. had been deposited with the Alliance Bank could only have been inserted with the object of leading those who read it to believe that the defendants were serious in their proposal, and would fulfil their promise in the event mentioned; their own words, “shewing our sincerity in the matter,” state as much. It may be that, of the many readers of the advertisement, very few of the sensible ones would have entertained expectations that in the event of the smoke ball failing to act as a preventive against the disease, the defendants had any intention to fulfil their attractive and alluring promise; but it must be remembered that such advertisements do not appeal so much to the wise and thoughtful as to the credulous and weak portions of the community; and if the vendor of an article, whether it be medicine smoke or anything else, with a view to increase its sale or use, thinks fit publicly to promise to all who buy or use it that, to those who shall not find it as surely efficacious as it is represented by him to be he will pay a substantial sum of money, he must not be surprised if occasionally he is held to his promise.

I notice that in the present case, the promise is of 100l. reward; but the substance of the offer is to pay the named sum as compensation for the failure of the article to produce the guaranteed effect of the two weeks' daily use as directed. Such daily use was sufficient legal consideration to support the promise. In Williams v Carwardine (1833) 4 B. & Ad. 621 the defendant, on April 25, 1831, published a handbill, stating that whoever would give such information as should lead to the discovery of the murder of Walter Carwardine should, on conviction, receive a reward of 20l. In August, 1831, the plaintiff gave information which led to the conviction of one Williams. The Court, consisting of Lord Denman, C.J., Littledale, Parke, and Patteson, JJ., held, that the plaintiff was entitled to recover the 20l. upon the ground that the advertisement amounted to a general promise or contract to pay the offered reward to any person who performed the condition mentioned in it, namely, who gave the information. If authority was wanted to confirm the view I have taken, it is furnished by the case I have just cited.

== Submissions before the Court of Appeal ==
For the Carbolic Smoke Ball Co., two new barristers (Asquith QC had just become Home Secretary), Finlay QC and T. Terrell made similar submissions to the counsel in the Queen's Bench, but also relied on new authorities to argue the company out of any contract. They again argued that the contract was not like other reward cases, because catching the flu was not something you had control over, and that the words in the advertisement expressed a vague intention but in no way amounted to a promise. They said the terms were far too vague to make any contract. New arguments were that there was no "consideration" moving from the plaintiff - Mrs Carlill did nothing of value for the company - by getting the flu. They also argued that there was no communication of an intention by Mrs Carlill to accept the offer, and they relied on Brogden v. Metropolitan Ry. Co., where Lord Blackburn had said that to get a contract simply performing a private act is not enough to create obligations on other people. If one was honestly going to take the advertisement seriously, then it would allow someone that stole the Smoke Ball, and used it and got the flu, to get a reward. But that would be absurd because there would be no benefit given to the company. And, using the arguments from the Queen's Bench briefly, even if it was a contract between a purchaser and the company, it would still be void as a wagering (gambling) contract or as an insurance contract without the required form.

After these arguments were given, the court of appeal indicated they did not need further submissions on the wager or insurance point (they did not think the arguments were very good at all). Dickens QC and Wilfred Baugh Allen appeared for Mrs Carlill. They argued the advertisement was clearly an advertisement that looked like it should be acted on, and it was rich for the company to then say it was an empty boast. The advert was to the whole public, and a contract arose whenever the conditions in the ad were acted on. There needed to be no direct communication, because conduct in accordance with terms of an agreement can constitute acceptance. When an offer is made to all the world, nothing can be imported beyond the conditions initially stated, nor can notice before the event be required. The promise is to those who do the required acts, not to those who say and then do the act. The terms were not uncertain, nor were the parties uncertain, and it should be clear that people who lawfully acquired a smokeball could benefit. There would be no reason for a limitation to people who got the smokeball as a gift, because an increased sale being a benefit to the defendants, though effected through a middleman, and the use of the balls must be presumed to serve as an advertisement and increase the sale. The amount of time the smokeball should last (and the company be bound by) was a matter of construction, of which several were possible (a fortnight, till the flu epidemic ends). The best would be a reasonable period of a fortnight. The consideration was good and the case of Gerhard v. Bates did not undermine it.

Finlay QC then replied, again stressing the absurdity of holding the company liable on such a vague advertisement, and especially because there was no real request to use the smokeball in the advert. That a contract should be completed by a private act is against the language of Lord Blackburn in Brogden v. Metropolitan Ry. Co.. The use of the ball at home stands on the same level as the writing a letter which is kept in the writer's drawer. There was no service done for the company. On the issue of time limits, the fact that it is difficult to decide should show, submitted Finlay QC, that the fair result is no contract at all.

== See also ==
- Carlill v Carbolic Smoke Ball Company
