= Malcolm McCusker =

Australian barrister, philanthropist, and governor (born 1938)

The Honourable Malcolm McCusker AC CVO KC
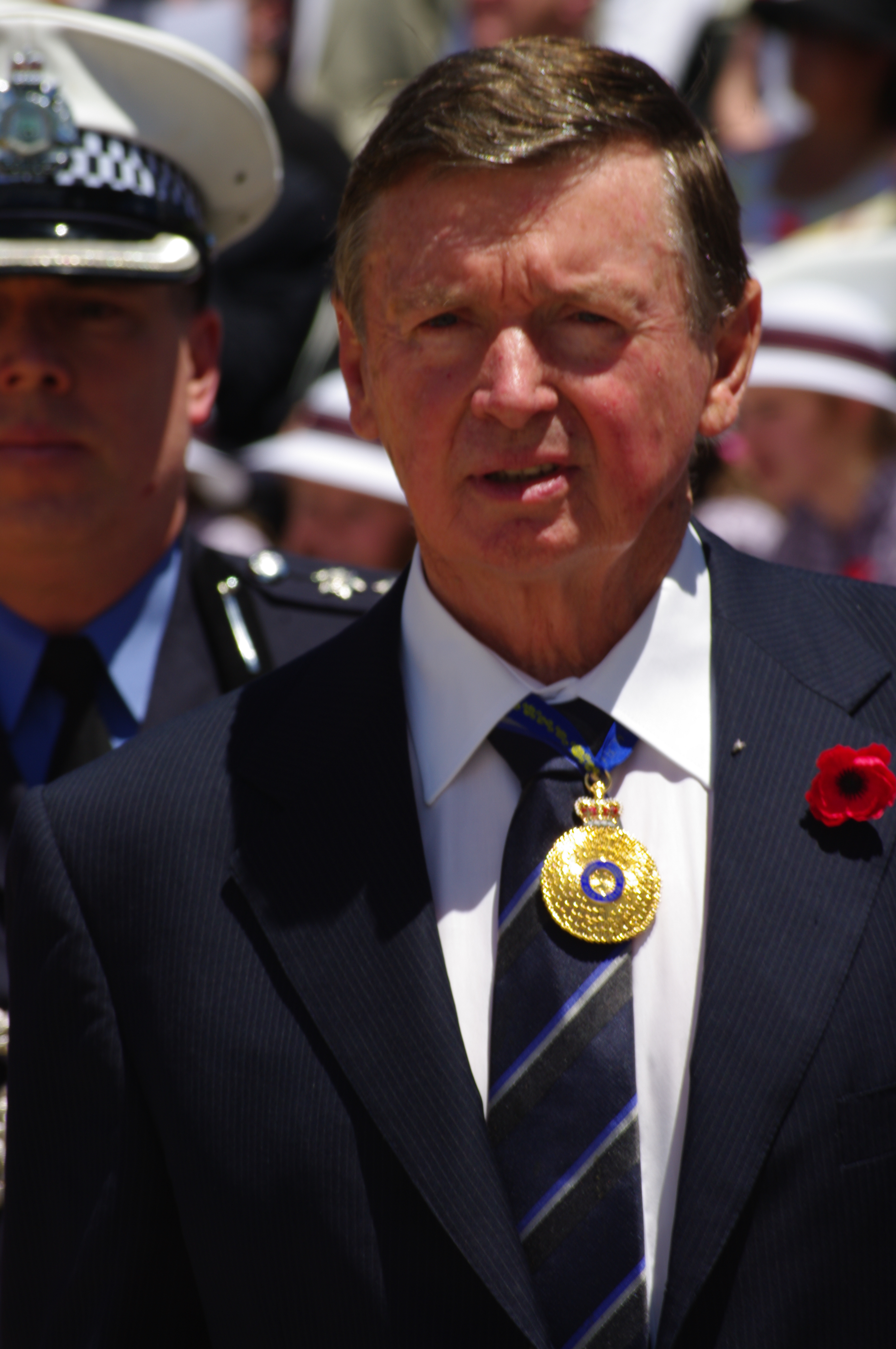
- McCusker in 2011

31st Governor of Western Australia
- In office 1 July 2011 – 30 June 2014
- Monarch: Elizabeth II
- Premier: Colin Barnett
- Lieutenant: Wayne Martin
- Preceded by: Ken Michael
- Succeeded by: Kerry Sanderson

Personal details
- Born: Malcolm James McCusker; 6 August 1938 (age 88) Subiaco, Western Australia
- Spouse: Tonya McCusker (née Batalin)
- Education: University of Western Australia
- Profession: Lawyer

Malcolm James McCusker AC CVO KC (born 6 August 1938) is an Australian barrister and philanthropist who was the 31st Governor of Western Australia, serving from July 2011 to June 2014.

Born in Perth, McCusker was educated at Hobart High School (in Hobart, Tasmania) and Perth Modern School, and later completed a Bachelor of Laws degree at the University of Western Australia. Appointed Queen's Counsel in 1982, he worked as a barrister before being named governor, and also chaired several legal committees. In his role as governor, McCusker and his wife served as the patrons for over 100 charitable organisations, including the Perth International Arts Festival, Telethon, and the West Australian Ballet, and the Western Australian branches of Anglicare, the Royal Flying Doctor Service, the Royal Life Saving Society, the RSPCA, and St. John Ambulance. He remains Co-Patron of the W.A. Ear Science Institute and is Patron of the West Coast Eagles Football Club.

== Life and career ==
The son of James McCusker, a Perth-based banker, Malcolm McCusker was born at Kensington Hospital in Subiaco, Western Australia, on 6 August 1938. He attended North Perth Primary School before moving with his parents to Hobart, Tasmania, where he attended Lenah Valley Primary School and Hobart High School. McCusker subsequently returned to Western Australia, where he completed his secondary education at Perth Modern School, and was then accepted into the University of Western Australia (UWA), graduating with a Bachelor of Laws degree. He was admitted to practice in 1961, and, as a barrister, appeared as counsel in the Supreme Court of Western Australia, the Federal Court, the High Court, and the Privy Council of the United Kingdom.

From 1963 to 1982, McCusker also served as a part-time lecturer at UWA's Faculties of Commerce and Law. He was appointed Queen's Counsel in 1982, and subsequently served as chairman of a number of legal committees in Western Australia, including the Legal Aid Commission of Western Australia and the Western Australian Constitutional Committee. In 1989, McCusker was appointed special inspector to investigate the collapse of Rothwells Merchant Bank. His report led to the establishment of a royal commission to examine the "WA Inc" scandal, and several criminal prosecutions. Having first become involved in surf lifesaving in 1955, McCusker is a member of the North Cottesloe Surf Livesaving Club. In October 1997, he was involved in the rescue of two men, including former Australian rules footballer Brian Sierakowski, whose surf ski had been bitten in half by a five-metre (16-foot) long white pointer shark 50 metres (160 ft) off of Cottesloe Beach.

For "service to the legal profession, ... the business and finance sectors, and to the community", McCusker was made an Officer of the Order of Australia (AO) in the 2005 Australia Day Honours. He was named Western Australia Citizen of the Year (Professions) in 2005, and in 2010 was WA Citizen of the Year (Community Service), Philanthropist of the Year, and Western Australia's Australian of the Year. He has also been awarded honorary doctorates from Edith Cowan University, University of Western Australia Murdoch University and Curtin University. After being appointed governor, he declared his intention to donate his $422,678 salary to charities, including the Lions Eye Institute, Salvation Army and organisations devoted to the health of Australia's indigenous peoples. He was personally appointed a Commander of the Royal Victorian Order by Elizabeth II during the royal visit to Australia in October 2011. McCusker was advanced to Companion of the Order of Australia (AC) in the 2012 Australia Day Honours for "service as a lawyer, an advocate for sustainable development and education, and philanthropy in medical research, youth and arts organisations".

In June 2014, McCusker retired as governor when his three-year term expired, and resumed practice as a barrister in Perth. He was succeeded by Kerry Sanderson, taking office on 20 October 2014.

McCusker is a supporter of voluntary assisted dying. In late 2018 and early 2019, he led a panel to draft voluntary assisted dying laws for the McGowan government. The laws were passed by the parliament in December 2019.

== Personal life ==
McCusker married Tonya Batalin in 2007, with whom he has one child. He is also stepfather to Tonya's two other children. He also has three adult children from a previous marriage, four grandsons and one granddaughter.

Government offices
| Preceded by Ken Michael | Governor of Western Australia; 2011–2014 | Succeeded by Kerry Sanderson |
