= Lawrence Stanley Jackson =

Lawrence Stanley Jackson (2 April 1884 in Stepney, South Australia, Australia – 7 August 1974 in North Adelaide, South Australia, Australia) was the Australian Taxation Commissioner from 1939 to 1946.

His son, Sir Lawrence Jackson, was the Chief Justice of the Supreme Court of Western Australia in 1969 until his retirement in 1977.
