= Stephen Henry Parker =

Chief Justice in Western Australia

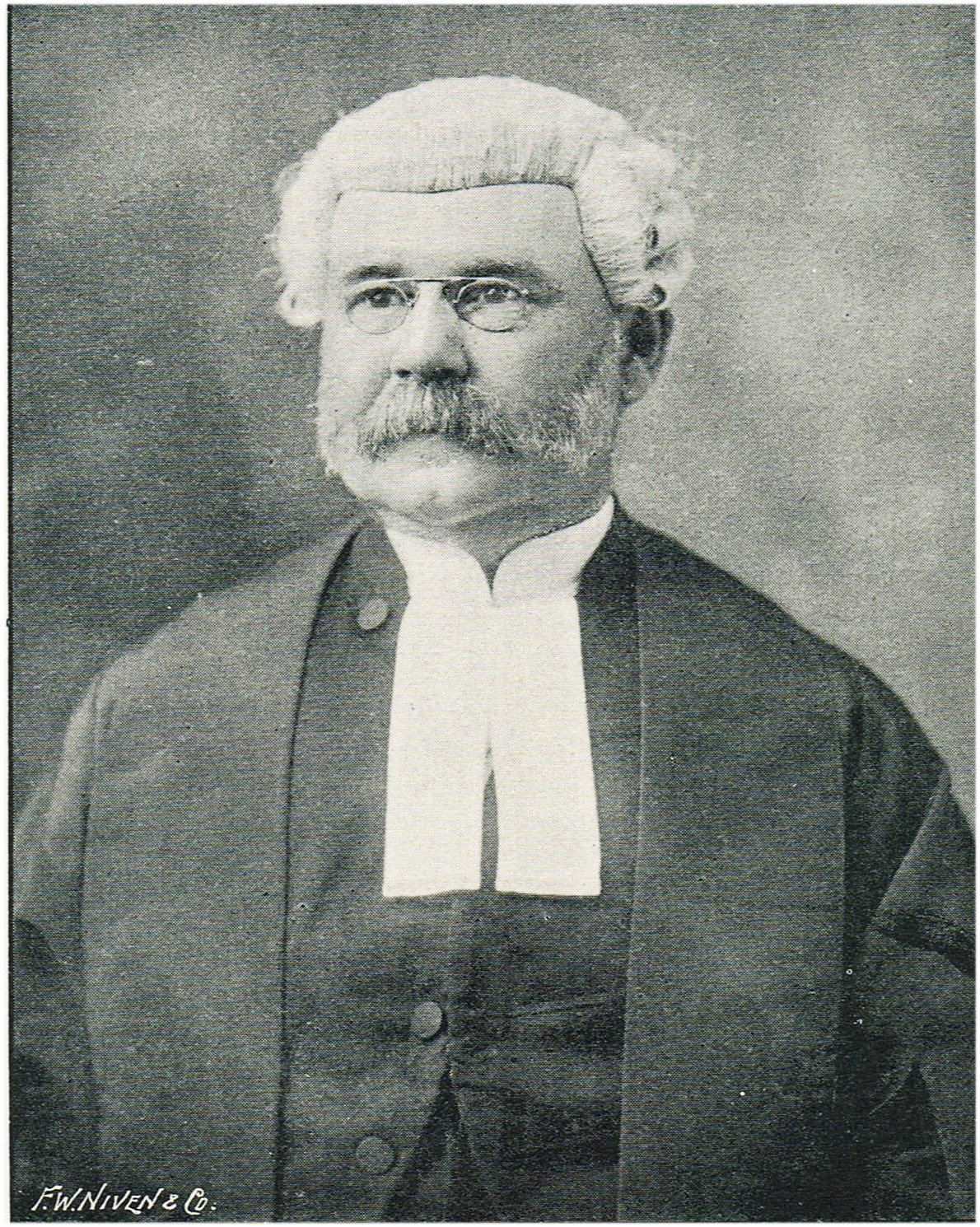
- Born: 7 November 1846
- Died: 13 December 1927 (aged 81)
- Education: Bishop's School, Perth
- Occupations: Lawyer; Politician
- Spouse: Amey Katharine Leake
- Children: 4 sons 7 daughters
- Parent(s): Stephen Stanley Parker; Elizabeth Sewell
- Relatives: George Walpole Leake (father-in-law)

Sir Stephen Henry Parker KCMG (7 November 1846 – 13 December 1927) was a lawyer and Chief Justice of the Supreme Court of Western Australia from 1906 to 1914.

== Biography ==
=== Early life ===
Parker was the second son of Stephen Stanley Parker (1817–1904) and his wife Elizabeth, née Sewell. He was the grandson of Stephen Parker (c. 1795 – 1879), a pioneer settler in York, Western Australia. Parker was educated at the Bishop's School, Perth, and was called to the bar in 1868.

=== Career ===
Parker served as colonial secretary in the John Forrest ministry from October 1892 to December 1894 when he retired. He was also chairman of the Perth City Council from November 1877 to 1879, for a few months in 1880-81 and mayor from February to October 1892. In 1881, he joined with his brother George to form the well-known law firm Parker and Parker (which in 1997 merged with the Perth office of Freehill Hollingdale & Page).

=== Personal life and death ===
Parker married Amey Katharine Leake, daughter of George Walpole Leake on 27 July 1872. She died in 1914. They had four sons and seven daughters who reached adulthood. Their second son Hubert Stanley Wyborn Parker (1883–1966) was the member of the Western Australian Legislative Assembly for North-East Fremantle in 1930–33, and of the Western Australian Legislative Council for Metropolitan-Suburban province in 1934–54. He was attorney-general for two months in 1933 and chief secretary in 1948–50.

Parker, and his brother George, were heavily involved with the East Perth (now known as Perth) Cricket Club in the W.A.C.A. Competition. He was club president from 1899 to 1903.

He died on 13 December 1927.

== See also ==
- Judiciary of Australia

Legal offices
Preceded by Sir Edward Stone	Chief Justice of Western Australia; 1906 – 1913	Succeeded by Sir Robert McMillan
