= Peter Quinlan =

Australian judge

The Honorable Chief Justice Peter Quinlan

14th Chief Justice of Western Australia
- Incumbent
- Assumed office 13 August 2018
- Preceded by: Wayne Martin

Solicitor-General of Western Australia
- In office 1 July 2016 – 10 October 2018
- Preceded by: Grant Donaldson

Lieutenant Governor of Western Australia
- Incumbent
- Assumed office 27 November 2019
- Preceded by: Wayne Martin

Personal details
- Born: 16 June 1970 (age 55)
- Children: 5

Peter Damien Quinlan (born 16 June 1970) is the Lieutenant-Governor of Western Australia. He was sworn in on 27 November 2019. He is also the Chief Justice of Western Australia. His appointment was announced on 1 August 2018, and took effect on 13 August. He was the Solicitor-General of Western Australia from 2016 to 2018.

Quinlan attended John XXIII College before studied commerce and law at the University of Western Australia; he won the HCF Keall Prize for best final year student. He worked in the Crown Solicitor's Office from 1993 to 1995 as an assistant to the Solicitor General, then again from 1996 working in constitutional and administrative law.

In 2001, Quinlan commenced practising as a barrister. He was appointed Senior Counsel in 2010, and was president of the WA Bar Association from 2012 to 2015. He was appointed as Solicitor-General of Western Australia on 1 July 2016. He has also served as director of the Law Council of Australia, and on the board of governors for the University of Notre Dame.

== Personal life ==
Quinlan is married with five children.

He is the great great grandson of a convict transportee, Daniel Connor.

Legal offices
Preceded by Wayne Martin	Chief Justice of Western Australia; 2018 -	Incumbent
