= Edward Albert Stone =

Australian judge

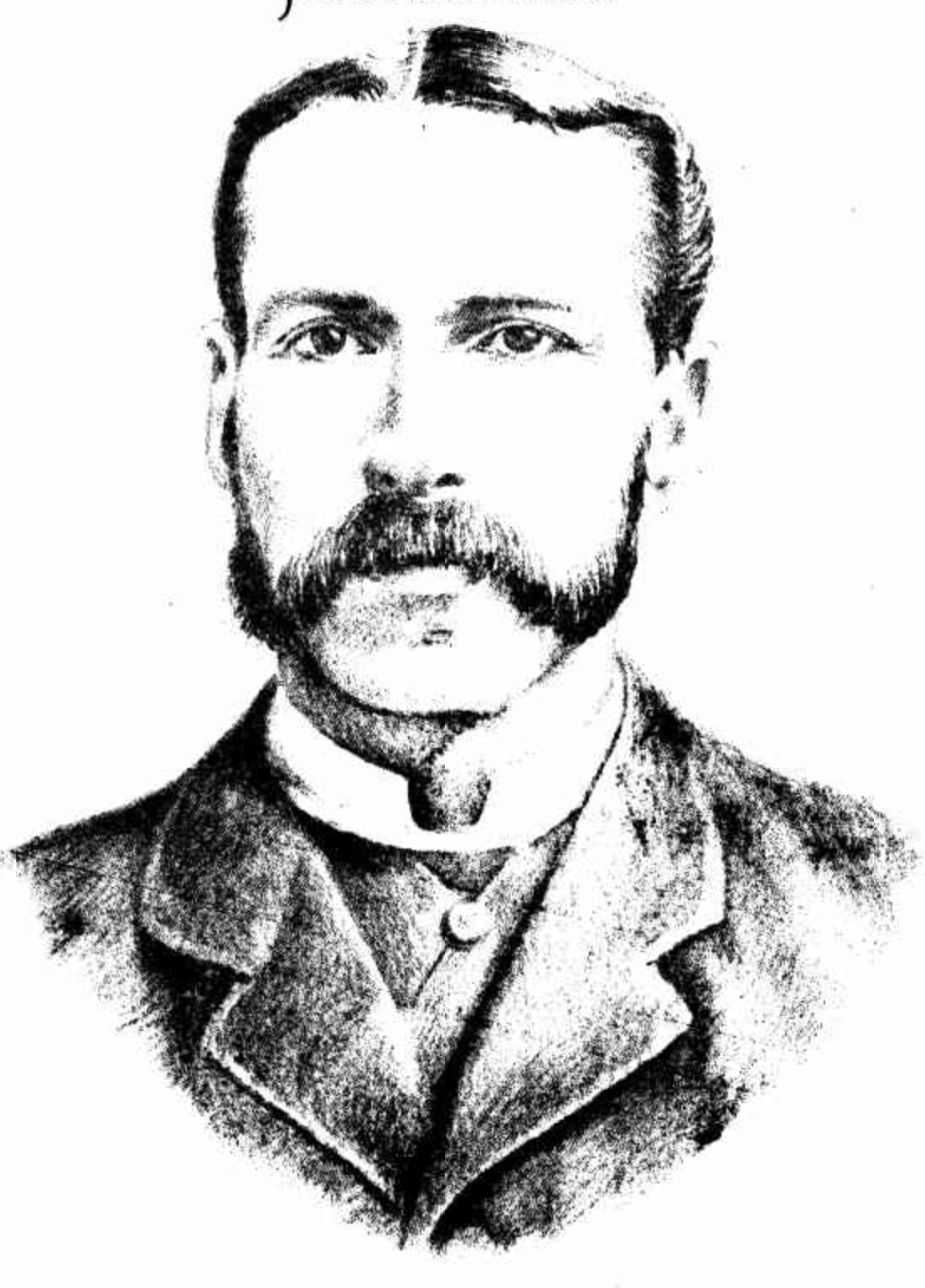
Stone in 1888

Sir Edward Albert Stone KCMG (9 March 1844 – 2 April 1920) was an Australian lawyer, lieutenant governor, politician and the fourth Chief Justice of Western Australia.

Stone was born in Perth, Western Australia, the second son and third of nine children of George Frederick Stone, an early attorney-general of the colony of Western Australia. Edward Stone was educated at Chigwell School, Essex, England and then joined his father's Perth law firm in 1860 and was called to the bar in 1865. Stone was clerk of the Legislative Council 1870–74, and acting attorney-general, and acting judge of the Supreme Court of Western Australia 1879–1883.

Stone was appointed a puisne judge of the Supreme Court in 1883 and succeeded Sir Alexander Onslow as Chief Justice in 1901, a position he held until 1906 when health problems forced his retirement. Stone once addressed a man appearing in his own defence: "You may be poor, but you are still entitled to justice." Stone was made a knight bachelor on 15 August 1902, after the honour had been announced in the 1902 Coronation Honours list published on 26 June 1902. In 1912 he was made a Knight Commander of the Order of St Michael and St George (KCMG).

In addition to his career as a lawyer and judge, Stone was a member of the Church of England and was involved in various philanthropic, educational and cultural movements in Western Australia.

Stone married Susannah Shenton on 13 July 1867, and they had ten children. He died in Perth, aged 76, on 2 April 1920.

== See also ==
- Judiciary of Australia

Legal offices
Preceded by Sir Alexander Onslow	Chief Justice of Western Australia; 1901 - 1906	Succeeded by Sir Stephen Henry Parker
