= Wallace Kyle =

Royal Air Force Air Chief Marshal (1910-1988)

Air Chief Marshal Sir Wallace Kyle GCB, KCVO, CBE, DSO, DFC, KStJ

24th Governor of Western Australia
- In office 24 November 1975 – 30 September 1980
- Monarch: Elizabeth II
- Premier: Sir Charles Court
- Preceded by: Sir Hughie Edwards
- Succeeded by: Sir Richard Trowbridge

Personal details
- Born: 22 January 1910 Kalgoorlie, Western Australia
- Died: 31 January 1988 (aged 78) Lymington, Hampshire
- Nickname: "Digger"

Military service
- Allegiance: United Kingdom
- Branch/service: Royal Air Force
- Years of service: 1928–1968
- Rank: Air Chief Marshal
- Commands: RAF Strike Command (1968); RAF Bomber Command (1965–68); RAF Technical Training Command (1959–62); Air Headquarters Malaya (1955–57); RAF Downham Market (1944); RAF Marham (1942–44); No. 139 Squadron (1940–42)
- Battles/wars: Second World War; Malayan Emergency
- Awards: Knight Grand Cross of the Order of the Bath; Knight Commander of the Royal Victorian Order; Commander of the Order of the British Empire; Distinguished Service Order; Distinguished Flying Cross; Knight of the Venerable Order of Saint John; Mentioned in Despatches (4)

Air Chief Marshal Sir Wallace Hart Kyle, GCB, KCVO, CBE, DSO, DFC, KStJ (22 January 1910 – 31 January 1988) was an Australian who served in the Royal Air Force (RAF) as a senior commander and later as the 24th Governor of Western Australia. Born in Kalgoorlie, Western Australia, Kyle was commissioned into the RAF in 1929, and, having seen service in the Second World War and the Malayan Emergency, held a number of senior positions, including Vice-Chief of the Air Staff and commander-in-chief of the RAF's Bomber Command and Strike Command. He was made Governor of Western Australia in 1975, a position in which he served until 1980, later returning to England, where he died in 1988.

== Early life ==
Kyle was born in Kalgoorlie, Western Australia, on 22 January 1910 to Alfred Kyle, a builder, and Christina Ellen (née Beck). He was educated at Kalgoorlie State School and later Guildford Grammar School, where he was a boarder and proved a capable sportsman and athlete.

== RAF career ==
Kyle entered the Royal Air Force College Cranwell in 1928 and was commissioned into the Royal Air Force in December 1929. While at Cranwell, he represented the college at cricket, squash and tennis and he attained the rank of flight cadet corporal.

As a pilot officer, Kyle was posted to No 17 Squadron as a pilot and subsequently, on 2 July 1931, to No 442 (Fleet Spotter Reconnaissance) Flight Fleet Air Arm as a flying officer (promoted 14 June 1931) (until 1939, the Fleet Air Arm was controlled by the RAF). He spent time at the RAF Depot from 12 August 1932 until his next operational posting to No 820 Squadron Fleet Air Arm on 2 May 1933. From 23 July, Kyle attended the Flying Instructor's Course at the Central Flying School, returning to Cranwell as an instructor on 20 October 1934. His promotion to flight lieutenant came on 14 June 1935.

Kyle went to Australia on an exchange posting with the Royal Australian Air Force in April 1936, returning to Britain in 1938. He was appointed as Squadron Commander at No 3 Flying Training School at RAF South Cerney on 25 June 1938 (he was promoted to squadron leader for this appointment). From 17 July 1939, he was appointed to the Air Staff, HQ Training Command and HQ Flying Training Command.

Kyle served in the Second World War and in 1940, after various posts in Bomber Command, he was appointed Officer Commanding No. 139 Squadron and received the temporary rank of wing commander on 1 December 1940. Kyle was appointed as Station Commander at RAF Marham in 1942 and another temporary promotion, to group captain, on 1 July 1943. He was appointed as Station Commander at RAF Downham Market on 7 March 1944 and then transferred to the Air Staff, HQ Bomber Command on 9 October 1944.

After the war, in 1945, Kyle joined the Directing Staff at the RAF Staff College, Bracknell. The temporary promotions received during the war were subsequently made substantive with permanent promotions to wing commander on 1 October 1946 and to group captain on 1 July 1947. Kyle joined the Air Plans team at Headquarters RAF Mediterranean & Middle East in October 1948. On 26 April 1949, he was appointed Air Aide de Camp to the King and continued as Air Aide de Camp to the Queen until 31 July 1956.

Kyle was appointed Assistant Commandant at Cranwell in 1951 and Director of Operational Requirements (Air) at the Air Ministry on 30 June 1952, with promotion to air commodore on 1 July. He became a temporary air vice-marshal and Air Officer Commanding at Air Headquarters Malaya on 14 January 1955 during the Malayan Emergency (the promotion was made permanent on 1 July 1955), Assistant Chief of the Air Staff (Operational Requirements) on 1 September 1957 and Air Officer Commanding-in-Chief, Technical Training Command on 29 September 1959. The last appointment came with a temporary promotion to air marshal which was made permanent on 1 January 1961. He became Vice-Chief of the Air Staff on 2 March 1962 and Air Officer Commander-in-Chief Bomber Command on 19 February 1965; he had been promoted to air chief marshal on 1 January 1964. Bomber Command merged with Fighter Command to form Strike Command, and Kyle became Strike Command's first Air Officer Commander-in-Chief on 30 April 1968.

On 12 August 1966, Kyle was again appointed to be Air Aide-de-camp to The Queen, which he remained until his retirement from the RAF on 9 November 1968.

== Governorship and retirement ==
Kyle served as Governor of Western Australia from 1975 until 1980 and briefly caused excitement when he spoke out in favour of developing a uranium processing plant at Kalgoorlie in 1978.

Kyle died on 31 January 1988 at Lymington.

In 1995, Lady Kyle renamed the South Wing of the RAF Benevolent Fund's Princess Marina House in Sussex, the "Kyle Wing" in Sir Wallace's honour. Sir Wallace Kyle had been the first chairman of the home.

== Honours and awards ==
- Knight Grand Cross of the Order of the Bath – 1 Jan 1966 (KCB – 1 January 1960, CB – 1 January 1953)
- Knight Commander of the Royal Victorian Order – 5 August 1977 [26 March 1977]
- Commander of the Order of the British Empire – 1 January 1946
- Distinguished Service Order – 26 October 1945
- Distinguished Flying Cross – 2 May 1941

Citation for the award of the Distinguished Flying Cross:

"Wing Commander Wallace Hart KYLE (26141), No.139 Squadron.

In April, 1941, this officer led an attack against Ijmuiden Iron and Steel Works. In spite of intense anti-aircraft fire and interference from a patrol of Messerschmitt 109's, he dropped his bombs on the target from a height of 50 feet. The enemy fighters followed Wing Commander Kyle out to sea, but, by his skilful flying, he forced them to break off the attack. The operation was an outstanding success. He has now completed a number of successful operational missions and his resolute determination and leadership have been largely responsible for the high standard of efficiency in his squadron".

- Knight of the Venerable Order of Saint John – 26 February 1976
- Air Aide de Camp to the King – 26 April 1949
- Air Aide de Camp to the Queen – 10 June 1952 to 31 July 1956
- Mentioned in Despatches four times – 11 June 1942, 14 January 1944, 1 January 1945, 4 June 1945
- Hon Doctor of Technology (Western Australian Institute of Technology) – 1979
- Hon Doctor of Law (University of Western Australia) – 1980

Military offices
Preceded by Sir Arthur McDonald	Air Officer Commanding-in-Chief Technical Training Command; 1959–1962	Succeeded by Sir Alfred Earle
Preceded by Sir Edmund Hudleston	Vice-Chief of the Air Staff; 1962–1965	Succeeded by Sir Brian Burnett
Preceded by Sir John Grandy	Commander-in-Chief Bomber Command; 1965–1968	Merged with Fighter Command to form Strike Command
New title	Commander-in-Chief Strike Command; April – November 1968	Succeeded by Sir Denis Spotswood
Government offices
Preceded by Sir Hughie Edwards	Governor of Western Australia; 1975–1980	Succeeded by Sir Richard Trowbridge
