= John Sanderson =

Australian lieutenant general

Lieutenant General the Honourable John Sanderson AC

29th Governor of Western Australia
- In office 18 August 2000 – 31 October 2005
- Monarch: Elizabeth II
- Premier: Richard Court; Geoff Gallop
- Preceded by: Michael Jeffery
- Succeeded by: Ken Michael

Personal details
- Born: 4 November 1940 (age 85) Geraldton, Western Australia
- Education: Royal Military College, Duntroon

Military service
- Allegiance: Australia
- Branch/service: Australian Army
- Years of service: 1958–1998
- Rank: Lieutenant General
- Commands: Chief of Army (1995–98); United Nations Transitional Authority in Cambodia (1992–93); 1st Brigade (1987–89); 1st Field Engineer Regiment (1979–80)
- Battles/wars: Malayan Emergency; Vietnam War; Cambodia (UNTAC)
- Awards: Companion of the Order of Australia

Lieutenant General John Murray Sanderson, AC (born 4 November 1940) is a retired senior Australian Army officer and vice-regal representative. He served as Force Commander of the United Nations Transitional Authority in Cambodia from 1992 to 1993, Chief of Army from 1995 to 1998, and was the 29th Governor of Western Australia from 2000 to 2005.

== Early life ==
Born in Geraldton, Western Australia on 4 November 1940, John Sanderson completed his secondary education at Bunbury High School in 1957 before entering the Royal Military College, Duntroon in 1958. He graduated in 1961 and was commissioned into the Royal Australian Engineers in December 1961.

== Military career ==
After completing a Fellowship Diploma in civil engineering at the Royal Melbourne Institute of Technology, Sanderson had a series of regimental postings. These included second in command of the 10th Field Squadron and troop commander and construction officer of the 21st Construction Squadron on operational service in Sabah, Malaysia. He was promoted to captain in 1965.

Following eighteen months as a staff officer in the Office of the Engineer in Chief, he was posted as the exchange instructor at the Royal School of Military Engineering in Chattenden, United Kingdom from 1967 to 1969. He returned to Australia to command the 23rd Construction Squadron at Holsworthy Barracks, prior to taking up command of the 17th Construction Squadron in South Vietnam at the end of 1970.

Returning to Australia in late 1971, he was the senior instructor at the School of Military Engineering throughout 1972 before attending the Army Command and Staff College at Fort Queenscliff in 1973.

Sanderson was promoted to lieutenant colonel in 1975 after serving for a short period as a Staff Officer at the Headquarters of Field Force Command. His initial appointment as Staff Officer Grade 1 at the Directorate of Engineers was followed by two years (1976–1978) as the Exchange Instructor at the British Army's Staff College, Camberley.

Sanderson commanded the 1st Field Engineer Regiment from 1979 to 1980, and then attended the Joint Services Command and Staff College in 1981. Sanderson was appointed as the military assistant to the Chief of the General Staff in late 1981, serving in that capacity until being promoted to colonel as director of army plans in 1983.

From June 1985 to the middle of 1986, he attended the U.S. Army War College, returning to Australia with the rank of brigadier. After a six-month period as chairman of the Army Reserve Review Committee, he assumed command of the 1st Brigade at Holsworthy.

Sanderson served as chief of staff, land command, for a brief period in 1989 and was then promoted to major general and appointed as assistant chief of defence policy. In this role he was tasked to develop and carry out major reforms to the Higher Australian Defence Force Staff, which resulted in him becoming the first assistant chief of defence force development at the end of 1989.

From October 1991, Sanderson became engaged directly in the United Nations process to bring peace to Cambodia, first as adviser to the Secretary General of the United Nations, and then from March 1992, in the rank of lieutenant general, as the commander of the 16,000-strong international military component of the United Nations Transitional Authority in Cambodia (UNTAC).

After the successful completion of the UN mission in October 1993, Sanderson returned to Australia to be appointed as the first commander, Joint Forces Australia, (now Chief of Joint Operations), and developed this role until becoming Chief of the General Staff in June 1995. This position was renamed to Chief of Army in 1997, and Sanderson continued in this position until his retirement from the army on 23 June 1998.

== Governor of Western Australia ==
On 18 August 2000, Sanderson was sworn in as 29th governor of Western Australia.

Sanderson retired as Governor of Western Australia in June 2005 after his term of office expired, but agreed to stay on until 31 October 2005 to assist with the transition to the new governor. His successor, Ken Michael, was sworn in on 18 January 2006.

== Publications ==
- 1999 "Australia's role in Asia"
- 1999 "International humanitarian law and the Balkans : the dilemma of a superpower"
- 2005 "Ride the whirlpool : selected speeches of Lieutenant General John Sanderson AC Governor of Western Australia 2000–2005", University of Western Australia Press. (Table of Contents, Catalogue entries: NLA)
- 2009 "The reconciliation journey"

== Honours and awards ==

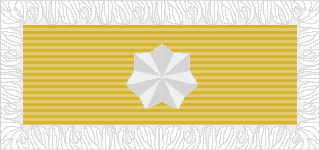

	Companion of the Order of Australia (AC)	26 January 1994 For eminent service and exceptional performance of duty to the Australian Defence Force particularly as the Commander UNTAC – United Nations Transitional Authority in Cambodia.
	Officer of the Order of Australia (AO)	26 January 1991
	Member of the Order of Australia (AM)	26 January 1985 For service as Director of Plans – Army Office.
	Knight of the Order of St John	27 November 2003
	Australian Active Service Medal 1945–1975	With the clasp VIETNAM
	General Service Medal	
	Vietnam Medal	
	Australian Active Service Medal	
	Centenary Medal	1 January 2001
	Defence Force Service Medal with Federation Star	for 40 years of service
	National Medal with Federation Star	for 15 years of service (14 July 1977)
	Australian Defence Medal	
	Vietnam Campaign Medal	(South Vietnam)
	United Nations Transitional Authority in Cambodia Medal	UNTAC (United Nations)
	Grand Cross of the Royal Order of Cambodia	(Cambodia) 2006
	Commander of the Legion of Merit	(United States) for his service to the region and the alliance.
Ribbon of the Meritorious Unit Citation	Meritorious Unit Citation with Federation Star	2014

Government offices
Preceded by Major General Michael Jeffery	Governor of Western Australia; 2000–2006	Succeeded by Ken Michael
Military offices
New command Position replaces Chief of the General Staff	Chief of Army; 1997–1998	Succeeded by Lieutenant General Frank Hickling
Preceded by Lieutenant General John Grey	Chief of the General Staff; 1995–1997	Position replaced by Chief of Army
