= John Dwyer (Australian judge) =

Australian judge

Sir John Patrick (Jack) Dwyer KCMG (24 June 1879 – 25 August 1966) was a native of Aberfeldy, Victoria who became Chief Justice and Lieutenant Governor of the State of Western Australia from 1945 to 1959.

== Early life ==
Dwyer was born on 24 June 1879 at Aberfeldy, Victoria, the elder son of Thomas Dwyer (b.1842 in Tipperary, Ireland) and Elizabeth Donaldson (b. 1855 in Melbourne, Australia). In Aberfeldy, the children were orphaned when their mother died in September 1884 and their father died just over a year later, in December 1885. Both parents are buried in the Aberfeldy Cemetery. Dwyer and his younger brother and sister were taken in by their mother's Scottish parents, David and Annie Donaldson, in nearby Morwell.

Seeing his academic achievements at the Morwell primary school, his grandmother enrolled him at Geelong College in 1890, where he excelled at cricket and football in addition to his academic work. Dwyer graduated as dux of the school in 1893, aged 14.

In 1894 he attended the University of Melbourne gaining a law degree, and became an articled clerk in 1897.

== Legal and military career ==
Dwyer was called to the Victorian Bar in 1902 but relocated to Western Australia in 1904 following an offer of employment with Fremantle barrister (and MP) Matthew Moss. He was admitted to the Western Australian Bar in the same year.

In 1908 Dwyer married Emily Louise Munro Irgens at St John's Church in Fremantle. The couple had no children, and their story has been kept alive by the Irving family, since Dwyer's aunt, Mary Edith Donaldson had married George Irving, a grazier, in 1906.

After a brief period with Albany law firm Hayes and Robinson Dwyer returned to Fremantle as junior partner to Moss in 1911.

During World War II, Dwyer enlisted with the Australian Imperial Forces on 30 May 1916 shortly after the ANZAC withdrawal from Gallipoli, and was commissioned as a lieutenant a year later. Arriving in France four months before Armistice Day, Dwyer served with the 44th Battalion during the closing stages of the German counteroffensive and in the immediate aftermath of the war itself. He returned to Australia in early 1919 and was officially demobilised on 23 July.

After the war Dwyer resumed his legal practice as a senior partner of the firm Moss, Dwyer, Unmack and Thomas and was selected by the Barristers Board as a member of the three-person committee to consider the establishment of a law school at the University of Western Australia.

He became a lecturer at the new law school in 1928 and in 1929 was appointed as a judge of the Supreme Court.

On 1 January 1946, Dwyer was appointed Chief Justice of Western Australia. He was knighted in the same year and further honoured with a KCMG in 1949.

== Retirement ==
Dwyer retired from the Court on 28 February 1959 at the age of 79. He continued his support and active involvement in the cultural and sporting life of his community.

Dwyer died on 25 August 1966 at his home in Shenton Park. After a state funeral he was buried with his wife, in the Karrakatta Cemetery. Many of his personal papers and photographs were donated to the Old Court House Law Museumn in Perth by Caroline ELizabeth Pummer, a journalist and Dwyer's wife's niece.

== See also ==
- Judiciary of Australia

Legal offices
Preceded by Sir John Northmore	Chief Justice of Western Australia; 1945 - 1959	Succeeded by Sir Albert Wolff
