= Alexander Onslow =

Australian politician

Sir Alexander Onslow

3rd Chief Justice of Western Australia
- In office 1883–1901
- Monarch: Victoria
- Governor: Sir Frederick Broome; Sir William C. F. Robinson; Sir Gerard Smith
- Preceded by: Sir Henry Wrenfordsley
- Succeeded by: Sir Edward Stone

Attorney-General of Western Australia
- In office 21 March 1881 – 9 April 1883
- Preceded by: Sir George Walpole Leake QC
- Succeeded by: Sir George Walpole Leake QC

Personal details
- Born: 17 July 1842
- Died: 20 October 1908 (aged 66) England
- Spouse(s): Madeline Emma, née Loftus
- Relations: Arthur Alexander Walton Onslow (brother)
- Parents: Arthur Pooley Onslow (father); Rosa Roberta, née McLeay (mother)
- Education: Trinity College, Cambridge
- Occupation: Barrister; jurist
- Awards: Knight Bachelor

Sir Alexander Campbell Onslow (17 July 1842 – 20 October 1908) was the third Chief Justice of the Supreme Court of Western Australia, which is the highest ranking court in the Australian State of Western Australia.

Onslow is a forebear of the notable Australian Macarthur-Onslow families.

== Biography ==
Onslow was the fourth son of Arthur Pooley Onslow, of Send Grove, Ripley, Surrey, by his wife, Rosa Roberta, daughter of Alexander Macleay, F.R.S., Speaker of the first New South Wales Legislative Council. Onslow was educated at Westminster School and Trinity College, Cambridge, where he graduated B.A. in 1864. He entered at the Inner Temple on 15 January 1862, was called to the bar on 17 November 1868, and went the Home Circuit. On 4 February 1878, he married Madeline Emma Loftus, daughter of Rev. Robert Loftus Tottenham, of Florence, and granddaughter of the Bishop of Clogher.

Onslow was Attorney-General of British Honduras from 1878 to 1880, and Attorney-General of Western Australia from 1880 to 1883. In July of the latter year he was appointed Chief Justice, in which capacity he administered the government during the absence of Sir Frederick Broome in England in 1884–5. Onslow's relations with that Governor having subsequently become strained, the latter threatened Onslow's security of tenure by "interdicting" him from his functions as Chief Justice, for the alleged premature and improper publication of certain correspondence then pending between them and with the Colonial Office. The Executive Council unanimously confirmed the interdict, and placed Mr. Onslow on half-pay pending the decision of the Colonial Office. In the result, Lord Knutsford reinstated Mr. Onslow, but censured him. Ultimately, in view of the attitude assumed by the Chief Justice in adjudicating on certain cases of newspaper libel, the Legislative Council passed a resolution requesting the Home Government, in the interests of tranquillity, to transfer him to some other location. He was accordingly given, a year's leave of absence but this was extended. In February 1890 it was announced that he was to exchange posts with Sir Elliot Bovill, Chief Justice of Cyprus. This arrangement did not actually take place and Sir Henry T. Wrensfordsley was sent out to the colony in 1890 as Acting Chief Justice. Mr. Onslow returned to Western Australia and resumed his occupancy of the office of Chief Justice in July 1891. He was Administrator of Western Australia during the Governor's absence from March 1900.

He retired in 1901 and returned to England, where he died on 20 October 1908.

Onslow was knighted in 1895 for services rendered to the Queen's colonies since 1878.

== Family ==
Father

- Arthur Pooley Onslow - father

Mother

- Rosa Roberta, née McLeay - mother
- Alexander McLeay (1767–1848) - Rosa Roberta's father
- Rosa Roberta's siblings
  - William Sharp Macleay (1792–1865) He never married and the heir to his estate was his brother, George W. J. Macleay
  - Sir George W. J. Macleay (1809–1891)
  - James Robert (1811–1892) secretary of the commission for the suppression of the slave trade in Cape Colony.
  - Margaret (b. 1802) married Archibald Clunes Innes (1800–1857) in 1829
  - Christiana Susan (b.1799) married Captain William Dumaresq (1793–1868) in 1830
  - Barbara Isabella (b.1797) married Pieter Laurentz Campbell (1809–1948) in 1834.

Siblings

- Arthur Alexander Walton Onslow (1833–1882) - brother
  - James Macarthur-Onslow - nephew

== See also ==
- Judiciary of Australia
- James Macarthur-Onslow#Family

Legal offices
| Preceded by Sir Henry Wrenfordsley | Chief Justice of Western Australia; 1883 - 1901 | Succeeded by Sir Edward Stone |
