= Richard Trowbridge =

Royal Navy Rear Admiral (1920-2003)

Rear-Admiral Sir Richard Trowbridge KCVO
- Rear Admiral Sir Richard Trowbridge

25th Governor of Western Australia
- In office 25 November 1980 – 24 November 1983
- Monarch: Elizabeth II
- Premier: Sir Charles Court (1980–1982); Ray O'Connor (1982–1983); Brian Burke (1983)
- Preceded by: Sir Wallace Kyle
- Succeeded by: Gordon Reid

Personal details
- Born: 21 January 1920 Andover, Hampshire, England
- Died: 4 May 2003 (aged 83) Portsmouth, England
- Nickname: Tom

Military service
- Allegiance: United Kingdom
- Branch/service: Royal Navy
- Years of service: 1935–1975
- Rank: Rear-Admiral
- Commands: HMY Britannia; HMS Hampshire; Fishery Protection Squadron; HMS Duncan; HMS Carysfort
- Battles/wars: Second World War
- Awards: Knight Commander of the Royal Victorian Order

Rear-Admiral Sir Richard John Trowbridge, KCVO (21 January 1920 – 4 May 2003), was a senior officer in the Royal Navy and the 25th Governor of Western Australia, serving from 25 November 1980 to 24 November 1983. He was the last non-Australian vice-regal representative in Australia. (Note: Davis McCaughey, born in what is now Northern Ireland, took up Australian citizenship shortly before being appointed governor of Victoria in 1986.) He was also the first officer to rise from boy seaman to captain of the Queen's yacht HMY Britannia.

== Early life and naval career ==
Richard John Trowbridge was born on 21 January 1920 to a farming family at Andover in the county of Hampshire, England. He was educated at Andover Grammar School and was fully expecting to become a farmer until a downturn in agriculture saw him leave school in 1935 at just 15 years of age to join the Royal Navy as a boy seaman. Trowbridge was quickly promoted through the navy ranks, and was commissioned as sub-lieutenant in 1940, serving throughout the Second World War at sea. At the end of hostilities, he was stationed in Singapore for a number of years where he was promoted to commander in 1953, and where he met and married Anne Perceval (1920–2013), on 26 February 1955.

From 1956 to 1958, Trowbridge captained the destroyer HMS Carysfort in the Mediterranean, and following this served as the second-in-command of the cruiser HMS Bermuda from 1958 to 1959. He then returned to the gunnery school at Whale Island in Portsmouth, where he was promoted to captain in 1960. From 1962 to 1964 he was captain of the frigate HMS Duncan and in charge of the Fishery Protection Squadron, and from 1967 to 1969 he commanded the guided missile destroyer HMS Hampshire, which for many years was the flagship of the Western Fleet.

Trowbridge became extra equerry to the Queen Elizabeth II in 1970 and he served as Flag Officer from 1970 to 1975.

== Governor of Western Australia ==
The Premier of Western Australia, Sir Charles Court, in 1975 sought to revive the practice of appointment of British-born governors for Western Australia, contrary to the advice of Lord Goronwy-Roberts, British Minister of State for Foreign Affairs, who supported the newly established custom that Australian state governors should be Australian-born. An initial compromise was the appointment of Sir Wallace Kyle, a retired Royal Air Force officer who, although totally Anglicised, was Kalgoorlie-born.

Following Kyle's term, Trowbridge was appointed Governor of Western Australia on Premier Court's recommendation, for a term from 25 November 1980 to 24 November 1983.

On completion of his term, Trowbridge returned to retirement in the United Kingdom living in Portsmouth. His life was overshadowed by exposure to asbestos which was being removed from Britannia during a long refit which he supervised, almost certainly leading to his death from lung cancer. He died on 4 May 2003, in Portsmouth.

== Notes ==
Government offices
Preceded by Air Chief Marshal Sir Wallace Kyle	Governor of Western Australia; 1980–1983	Succeeded by Gordon Reid
