= Lawrence Jackson (judge) =

Australian judge (1914–1993)

Sir Lawrence Walter Jackson KCMG (1914 – 5 June 1993) was a Chief Justice of the Supreme Court of Western Australia. He was appointed as a Supreme Court Judge in 1949 and became Chief Justice in 1969, retired in 1977, and died in 1993.

His father, Lawrence Stanley Jackson, was the Australian Taxation Commissioner from 1939 to 1946.

A son, Lawrence Alton Jackson, was a judge in the District Court of Western Australia from 13 July 1992 until his retirement on 16 February 2004.

A grandson, Lawrence Douglas Bignell Jackson, was elected to the Shire of Peppermint Grove council at the age of 20 in October 2021.

== See also ==
- Judiciary of Australia

Legal offices
| Preceded by Sir Albert Wolff | Chief Justice of Western Australia; 1969 - 1977 | Succeeded by Sir Francis Burt |
Academic offices
| Preceded by Sir Alexander Reid | Chancellor of the University of Western Australia; 1968 – 1981 | Succeeded by Donald Aitken |
