= Ken Michael =

Governor of Western Australia from 2006 to 2011

The Honourable Ken Michael AC
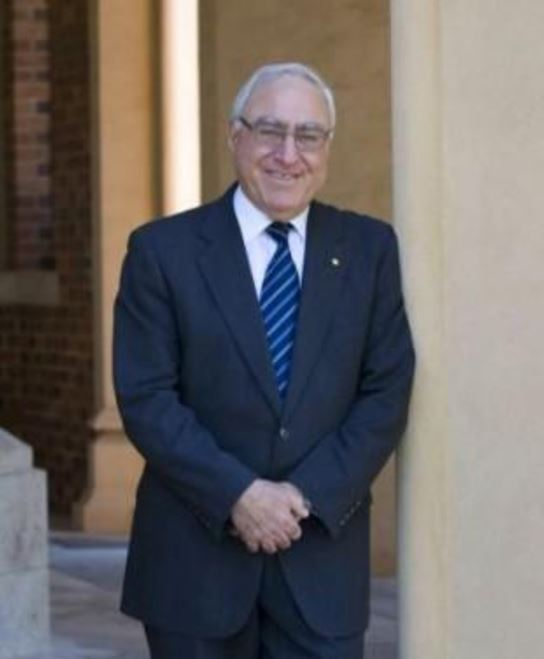

30th Governor of Western Australia
- In office 18 January 2006 – 2 May 2011
- Monarch: Elizabeth II
- Premier: Alan Carpenter; Colin Barnett
- Lieutenant: Wayne Martin
- Preceded by: John Sanderson
- Succeeded by: Malcolm McCusker

Personal details
- Born: Kenneth Comninos Michael; 12 April 1938 Perth, Western Australia
- Spouse: Julie Diana Michael (dec. 2014)
- Education: University of Western Australia; Imperial College
- Profession: Civil engineer

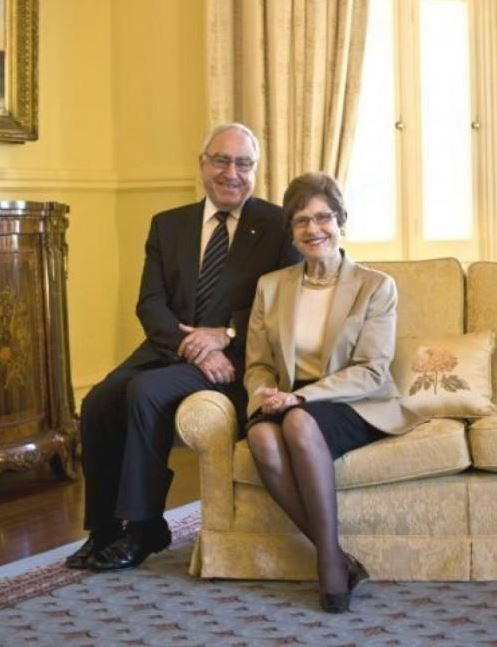
Ken Michael and his wife Julie

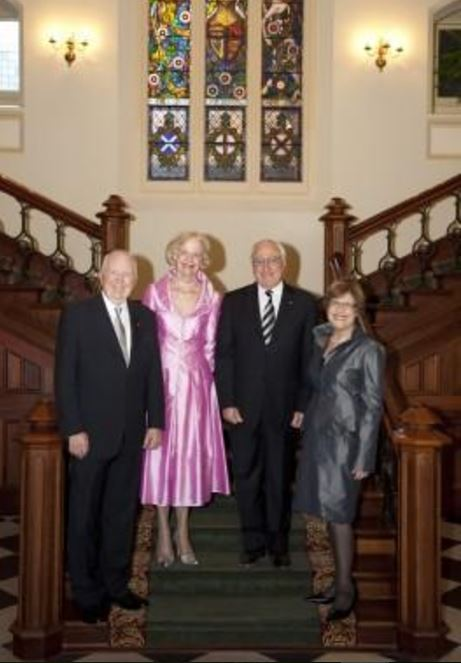
Ken Michael and his wife Julie receiving Quentin Bryce, the Governor-General of Australia, and her husband Michael, at Government House, Perth.

Kenneth Comninos Michael, AC (born 12 April 1938) is an Australian civil engineer, academic and former public servant who was the 30th Governor of Western Australia, serving from 2006 to 2011.

== Early life and career ==
Michael was born in Perth, Western Australia, the son of immigrants from the island of Kastellorizo in Greece.

Michael studied at Imperial College London and was a former Commissioner of Main Roads WA, a chairman of the East Perth Redevelopment Authority, a member of the Economic Regulation Authority, and was the Chancellor of the University of Western Australia.

Michael was appointed a Member of the Order of Australia in 1996, and elevated as a Companion of the Order of Australia in 2006. He was named Western Australian Citizen of the Year in 2001 and received the Centenary Medal in 2003 for "service to the public, engineering and the Greek Community".

== Governor of Western Australia ==
Michael's vice-regal appointment was announced on 6 June 2005 by the then Premier Geoff Gallop, and he was sworn in at Government House, Perth on 18 January 2006 by the Premier Alan Carpenter and also witnessed by Chief Justice of the Supreme Court of Western Australia and Lieutenant-Governor, David Malcolm.

In 2006, Michael was named the patron of the Fremantle Football Club, following in the footsteps of Lieutenant-General Sanderson who was also patron at Fremantle. He has been a member of the club since 1994 as an inaugural Quay Club member. Michael is also the state patron of The Boys' Brigade.

Michael resigned as governor on 2 May 2011. Lieutenant-Governor Wayne Martin became Administrator of Western Australia until Malcolm McCusker was sworn in as governor on 1 July 2011.

Michael was appointed Chairman of the Western Australian Cricket Association in December 2016.

Government offices
Preceded by Lieutenant General John Sanderson	Governor of Western Australia; 2006–2011	Succeeded by Malcolm McCusker
Preceded by Albert Tognolini	Commissioner of Main Roads WA; 1991–1997	Succeeded by Ross Drabble
Academic offices
Preceded by Alexander Cohen	Chancellor of the University of Western Australia; 2001–2005	Succeeded by Michael Chaney
