= John Northmore (judge) =

Australian judge (1865–1958)

Sir John Northmore KCMG

Chief Justice of Western Australia
- In office 1931–1945
- Preceded by: Sir Robert McMillan
- Succeeded by: Sir John Dwyer

Personal details
- Born: John Alfred Northmore; 14 September 1865 Adelaide, South Australia, Australia
- Died: 15 May 1958 (aged 92)
- Resting place: Karrakatta Cemetery
- Citizenship: Australian
- Spouse: Emily Agnes Ventris (née Culmer)
- Parents: John Alfred Northmore (father); Susan Northmore (née Churchill) (mother)
- Education: St Peter's College, Adelaide
- Alma mater: University of Adelaide
- Occupation: Barrister

Sir John Alfred Northmore KCMG (14 September 1865 – 15 May 1958) was a Chief Justice of the Supreme Court of Western Australia, which is the highest ranking court in the state of Western Australia. Northmore was appointed a judge of the Supreme Court in 1914 before being appointed Chief Justice in 1931. He retired in 1945 and died in 1958. He also served as Administrator of Western Australia from 1931 to 1933, fulfilling the functions of Governor after financial straits prevented a permanent successor to Governor Sir William Campion.

== Early life and education ==
Northmore was born on 14 September 1865 in Adelaide, South Australia. His parents were John Alfred Northmore and Susan Northmore (née Churchill). They were Quakers and were from the west of England. He was one of five children. He attended St Peter's College, Adelaide, and the University of Adelaide, graduating with a bachelor of law in 1887.

== Career ==
Northmore was called to the South Australian Bar in 1888. In 1896, he moved to Perth and was called to the Western Australia Bar on 15 September that year. He headed the legal practice Northmore, Lukin & Hale, later called Northmore, Hale, Davy & Leake. In c. 1911, he became a King's Counsel, and on 28 April 1914, he was appointed to the Supreme Court of Western Australia bench. On 29 September 1931, he became the Chief Justice of Western Australia, following the death of Sir Robert McMillan in April 1931.

When Sir William Campion resigned as Governor of Western Australia in June 1931, another governor was not appointed due to the state's financial issues. Northmore acted as Administrator from 9 June 1931, serving in place of the governor. On 29 June 1932, he became Lieutenant-Governor, which he served as until 10 July 1933, when he resigned due to Thomas Draper, senior puisne judge. Northmore was succeeded as Lieutenant-Governor by Sir James Mitchell. In 1945, Northmore retired as Supreme Court Justice.

In June 1932, Northmore received the honour of Knight Commander of the Order of St Michael and St George.

Within the University of Western Australia (UWA), Northmore was pro-chancellor from 1929 to 1930, member of the senate from 1930 to 1936, and chairman of its finance committee.

== Personal life ==
Northmore married Emily Agnes Ventris (née Culmer), on 6 March 1941 in a private Anglican chapel. He was a member of the Weld Club and the Royal Perth Yacht Club. His wife died in 1957, and he died on 15 May 1958. He was buried in Karrakatta Cemetery.

== Legacy ==
Northmore Street in Daglish, Western Australia and Northmore Crescent in Winthrop, Western Australia were named after John Northmore, for his work at UWA. These suburbs were formerly UWA endowment land, and so a number of their streets were named after prominent people at UWA.

Legal offices
Preceded by Sir Robert McMillan	Chief Justice of Western Australia; 1931 – 1945	Succeeded by Sir John Dwyer
