= Gordon Fitzgerald =

Gordon William Fitzgerald FRCOG (1871 or 1872–1944) was a physician on the honorary staff of the Northern Hospital for Women and Children who was also appointed to the Municipal Hospital in Manchester. He studied medicine in Edinburgh, Paris and Dublin, graduating M.B., C.M.Ed. in 1898, and proceeding M.D. in 1901. During the First World War he served with the Royal Army Medical Corps as the officer in command of the Fusehill Hospital in Carlisle. He was a founding fellow of the Royal College of Obstetricians and Gynaecologists.
