= Robert McMillan (Australian judge) =

Australian judge

Sir Robert Furse McMillan KCMG (24 January 1858 – 23 April 1931) was a Chief Justice of the Supreme Court of Western Australia, which is the highest ranking court in the Australian State of Western Australia.

Caricature by David Low

McMillan was born in Camden Town, London, England and educated at Westminster School. He was called to the bar in 1881. In late 1902 he was appointed as a judge of the Supreme Court of Western Australia, and he left the United Kingdom in January 1903 to take up the position after arrival in Western Australia the following month 1903. He stayed in Australia through the rest of his career.

McMillan was knighted in 1916, and appointed a Knight Commander of the Order of St Michael and St George (KCMG) in the 1925 Birthday Honours.

He was appointed Lieutenant-Governor of Western Australia in 1921.

He died on 23 April 1931, immediately after giving a speech at the opening of St George's College.

== See also ==
- Judiciary of Australia

Legal offices
Preceded by Sir Stephen Parker	Chief Justice of Western Australia; 1913 - 1931	Succeeded by Sir John Northmore
