= Williams v Carwardine =

English contract law case

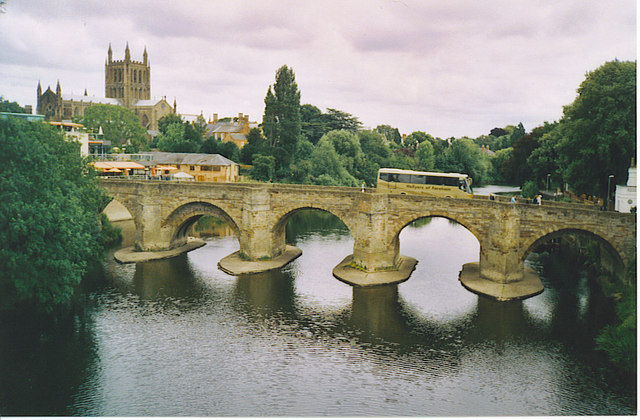
- Hereford, the city of the murder
- Court: King's Bench
- Decided: 22 March 1833
- Citations: [1833] EWHC KB J44, (1833) 4 B. & Ad. 621; 110 E.R. 590

Court membership
- Judges sitting: Lord Denman CJ, Littledale J, Parke J, and Patteson J

Williams v Carwardine [1833] EWHC KB J44 is an English contract law case which concerns how a contract comes about through the offer of a reward. It also raises interesting questions about the necessity of reliance on an offer in the formation of a contract.

== Facts ==
Mrs Mary Anne Williams claimed a reward of £20 from Mr Carwardine for giving information that led to the arrest of her husband, Mr William Williams, for murdering Mr Carwardine's brother. Walter Carwardine was murdered near a pub in Hereford in March 1831, and his body was found in the River Wye in April. The plaintiff, Mrs Williams, gave evidence at the Hereford assizes against two suspects, but did not say all she knew between 13 and 19 April. The suspects were acquitted. On 25 April 1831 the victim's brother and defendant, Mr Carwardine, published a handbill, stating there would be a £20 for

"whoever would give such information as would lead to the discovery of the murder of Walter Carwardine."

Shortly after, Mrs Williams was "beaten and bruised" by Mr Williams. Thinking she would die soon in August, 1831, and apparently to "ease her conscience", Mrs Williams gave more information which led to the conviction of her husband, Mr William Williams, and another man. She claimed the reward. Mr Carwardine refused to pay, arguing that she was not induced by the reward to give the information. At the trial her motives were examined. It was found that she knew about the reward, but that she did not give information specifically to get the reward.

Mrs Williams statement was as follows.

“The voluntary statement of Mary Anne Williams, made this 23rd day of August, 1831, before me, one of his Majesty's justices of the peace in and for the said city, who, on her oath saith, that, in consequence of her miserable and unhappy situation, and believing that she has not long to live, she makes this voluntary statement to ease her conscience, and in hopes of forgiveness hereafter. That, on Thursday night in the assize week, in the month of March last, between the hours of eleven and twelve o'clock, I went into Joseph Pugh's house, in Quaker's Lane, and there saw Susan Connop, Sarah Coley, Susan Reignart, Mr. Webb, the butcher, and Walter Carwardine. After drinking with them, I left the house with Mr. Webb. I walked as far as the King's Head Inn, in Broad Street; I returned by the way of Eign Street to the end of Quaker's Lane, by Eign Gate Turnpike. I went along the lane as far as the gate of Mr. Thomas the coachmaker's meadow opposite to the Cross Lane, where I heard a noise. I there saw Joseph Pugh, William Williams, a man of the name of Matthews, and Sarah Coley. I heard Mr. Carwardine's voice very plain. He said, [570] ‘For God's sake do not murder me.’ I heard Coley say, ‘I have got his blunt, and if you will keep secret I'll treat.’ Williams said, ‘We will soon put him out of the way.’ I then heard a dreadful blow, and Mr. Carwardine fell on the ground on his back. I distinctly heard two long deep groans, as if he was dying. I did not hear him speak. After a moment Williams saw me, he ran to me, and forced me into the turnpike road, near Eign Gate; Williams ran back along the lane to the Cross Lane; I went along the turnpike road to the Red Lion Inn, turned up Townditch Lane into the Cross Lane, but no one was there. I went into Quaker's Lane, by the end of the barn, and listened. I heard Pugh, Williams, Matthews, and Coley, about Mr. Thomas's house, the carpenter, three parts down the lane, towards the tan yard, I distinctly heard Pugh curse his eyes, and say, ‘Go on.’ Coley said, ‘Don't talk so loud; don't be in a hurry.’ I was very much frightened, and I got into the house, and went to bed. (Signed) Mary Anne Williams . “Sworn before me, William Milton.”

== Judgment ==
=== Nisi prius ===
At the trial (nisi prius) Mr Justice James Parke (Parke J) said,

"The motive was the state of her own feelings. My opinion is, the motive is not material."

He held that she was entitled to the reward.

=== Court of King's Bench ===
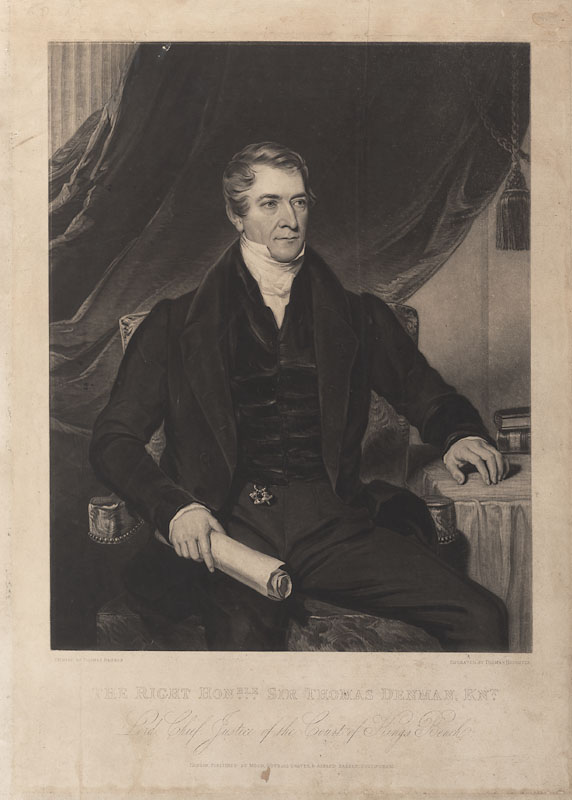
Lord Denman was Chief Justice for 18 years, from 1832 to 1850.

The Court, consisting of Lord Denman CJ, Littledale J and Patteson J held, that the plaintiff was entitled to recover the £20. The advertisement amounted to a general promise or contract to pay the offered reward to any person who performed the condition mentioned in it, namely, who gave the information. Two judges clearly stated that motives were irrelevant. One of two case reports read as follows.

Denman, C. J. — Was any doubt suggested as to whether the plaintiff knew of the handbill at the time of her making the disclosure?

Curwood [Counsel]. — She must have known of it, as it was placarded all over Hereford, the place at which she lived.

Mr. Justice J. Parke. — I take this to have been a contract with any one who did the thing.

Mr. Justice Littledale. — If the person knows of the handbill and does the thing, that is quite enough. It does not say, whoever will come forward in consequence of this handbill.

Denman, C. J. — As the plaintiff is within the terms of the handbill, she is entitled to the reward..

Mr. Justice Patteson. — The plaintiff being within the terms, her motive is not material.

== Significance ==
This case has generated some controversy, because in R v Clarke the Australian High Court held that it was consistent with the proposition that "reliance" on an offer is essential for the possibility of acceptance, and therefore formation of a contract. By contrast, Littledale J suggests that if someone "knows" of an offer, this is sufficient, whatever their motive. A third possibility is that no knowledge of an offer is necessary for the formation of a binding obligation (whether contractual or not). If someone offers a reward, or makes a general offer to anyone who performs certain terms, they will be bound by their offer to the person who confers a benefit upon them. Not to do so could be regarded either as unconscionable, or lead to unjust enrichment.

== See also ==
- Carlill v Carbolic Smoke Ball Company
- Shuey v United States, 92 US 73 (1875)
