= Chief Justice of Western Australia =

The chief justice of Western Australia is the most senior judge of the Supreme Court of Western Australia and the highest ranking judicial officer in the Australian state of Western Australia. The chief justice is both the judicial head of the Supreme Court as well as the administrative head. The chief justice is responsible for arranging the business of the court and establishing its rules and procedures.

The office of chief justice was created in 1861 when the Supreme Court was established through the amalgamation of the Court of Quarter Sessions and the Civil Court. The first chief justice was the West Indian born lawyer and former slaveholder Sir Archibald Burt. Initially, in line with the British colonial policy of the time, the chief justices were appointed by the Colonial Office from outside the colony. It was not until 1901 that Western Australia had its first Western Australian born Chief Justice.

By convention, the chief justice is usually also lieutenant governor, serving as deputy to the governor of Western Australia and acting in the position in the governor's absence. However, the two positions are not equivalent – Wayne Martin succeeded David Malcolm in the position in May 2006, but did not replace Malcolm as lieutenant governor until October 2009.

== List of chief justices of Western Australia ==
- Archibald Burt (1861–1879)
- Henry Wrenfordsley (1880–1883)
- Alexander Onslow (1883–1890)
- Sir Henry T. Wrensfordsley (1890–1891) (acting)
- Alexander Onslow (1891-1901)
- Sir Edward Stone (1901–1906)
- Stephen Parker (1906–1913)
- Robert McMillan (1913–1931)
- John Northmore (1931–1945)
- John Dwyer (1945–1959)
- Albert Wolff (1959–1969)
- Lawrence Jackson (1969–1977)
- Francis Burt (1977–1988)
- David Malcolm (1988–2006)
- Wayne Martin (2006–2018)
- Peter Quinlan (2018–)

== See also ==
- Judiciary of Australia
