= Governor of Western Australia =

Representative of the monarch in Western Australia

- Badge of the governor

- Standard of the Governor

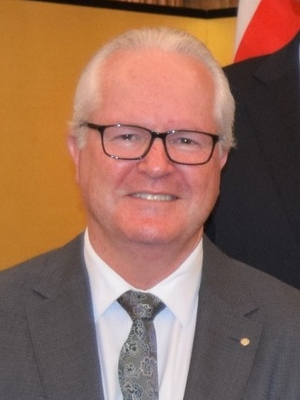
- Incumbent; Chris Dawson since 15 July 2022
- Viceregal
- Style: His Excellency the Honourable
- Residence: Government House, Perth
- Seat: Perth
- Appointer: Monarch; on the advice of the premier
- Term length: At His Majesty's pleasure; (usually 5 years by convention)
- Formation: 6 February 1832
- First holder: Captain James Stirling
- Website: govhouse.wa.gov.au

The governor of Western Australia is the representative in Western Australia of the monarch, King Charles III. As with the other governors of the Australian states, the governor of Western Australia performs constitutional, ceremonial and community functions, including:

- presiding over the Executive Council
- proroguing and dissolving the Legislative Assembly and the Legislative Council
- issuing writs for elections
- appointing Ministers, Judges, Magistrates and Justices of the Peace

Furthermore, all bills passed by the Parliament of Western Australia require the governor's signature before they become acts and pass into law. However, since convention almost always requires the governor to act on the advice of the premier and the cabinet, such approval is almost always a formality.

Until the appointment of Sir James Mitchell in 1948, all governors of Western Australia had been British officials. After Mitchell's appointment, a further three Britons served as governor: Mitchell's two immediate successors, and then, from 1980 to 1983, Rear-Admiral Sir Richard Trowbridge who was the last non-Australian governor of any Australian state.

Although not a responsibility of the office of Governor of Western Australia, governors of Western Australia are – like all governors of the Australian states – normally given a dormant commission to administer the government of the Commonwealth of Australia in the absence from Australia, or the death, incapacity or removal from office of the Governor-General by the Sovereign.

== Styles ==
The governor of Western Australia is styled "His Excellency" during his term in office (or Her Excellency for a female governor). In August 2014, three of the four living past governors – John Sanderson, Ken Michael and Malcolm McCusker – were given the style "The Honourable", on the recommendation of the premier. The other living former governor, Michael Jeffery, already held the style in virtue of his later service as governor-general of Australia.

== Governor's standard ==
The governor's standard of Western Australia is the same design as the British blue ensign with the union flag at the upper left quarter. On the right side, the state badge of Western Australia, comprising a black swan in a yellow disc, is surmounted by the St. Edward's crown.

If the standard is flying at Government House, on a vehicle or at an event, this indicates that the governor is present.

1870–1953

1953–1988

1988–present

== List of governors and lieutenant-governors ==
=== List of governors ===
Stirling was only commissioned as the governor of Western Australia on 4 March 1831, rectifying the absence of a legal instrument providing the authority detailed in Stirling's instructions of 30 December 1828. Stirling had said of his own position:

I believe I am the first Governor who ever formed a settlement without Commission, Laws, Instructions and Salary.

No.	Portrait	Governor	From	To
1		Captain Sir James Stirling	6 February 1832	2 January 1839
2		John Hutt	3 January 1839	26 January 1846
3		Lieutenant Colonel Andrew Clarke	27 January 1846	11 February 1847
-		Lieutenant Colonel Frederick Irwin (acting Governor)	12 February 1847	11 August 1848
4		Captain Charles Fitzgerald	12 August 1848	22 July 1855
5		Sir Arthur Kennedy	23 July 1855	27 February 1862
6		John Hampton	28 February 1862	1 November 1868
7		Sir Benjamin Pine (Note: Although formally appointed Governor, Pine never actually came to Western Australia to take up his post; the role was filled by an administrator, Lieutenant Colonel John Bruce.)	2 November 1868	29 September 1869
8		Sir Frederick Weld	30 September 1869	10 January 1875
9		Sir William Cleaver Francis Robinson	11 January 1875	11 November 1877
10		Major General Sir Harry Ord (Note: Ord was Lieutenant-Governor from 12 November 1877 to 29 January 1878.)	12 November 1877	9 April 1880
-		Sir William Robinson (2nd time)	10 April 1880	1 June 1883
11		Sir Frederick Broome	2 June 1883	19 October 1890
-		Sir William Robinson (3rd time)	20 October 1890	22 December 1895
12		Lieutenant Colonel Sir Gerard Smith	23 December 1895	30 April 1901
13		Sir Arthur Lawley	1 May 1901	23 March 1903
14		Admiral Sir Frederick Bedford	24 March 1903	30 May 1909
15		Sir Gerald Strickland	31 May 1909	16 March 1913
16		Major General Sir Harry Barron	17 March 1913	8 April 1917
17		Sir William Ellison-Macartney	9 April 1917	8 April 1920
18		Sir Francis Newdegate	9 April 1920	27 October 1924
19		Colonel Sir William Campion	28 October 1924	8 June 1931
		N/A (Note: The post of Governor was not filled between 1931 and 1948. Sir John Northmore was administrator until 29 June 1932. He was Lieutenant-Governor until 10 July 1933, and was succeeded as Lieutenant-Governor by Sir James Mitchell until 4 October 1948. Mitchell was appointed Governor from 5 October 1948.)	1931	1948
20		Sir James Mitchell	5 October 1948	30 June 1951
21		General Sir Charles Gairdner	6 November 1951	26 June 1963
22		Major General Sir Douglas Kendrew	25 October 1963	6 January 1974
23		Air Commodore Sir Hughie Edwards	7 January 1974	2 April 1975
24		Air Chief Marshal Sir Wallace Kyle	24 November 1975	24 November 1980
25		Rear Admiral Sir Richard Trowbridge	25 November 1980	24 November 1983
26		Gordon Reid	2 July 1984	30 September 1989
27		Sir Francis Burt	20 March 1990	31 October 1993
28		Major General Michael Jeffery	1 November 1993	17 August 2000
29		Lieutenant General John Sanderson	18 August 2000	31 October 2005
30		Ken Michael	18 January 2006	2 May 2011
31		Malcolm McCusker	1 July 2011	30 June 2014
32		Kerry Sanderson	20 October 2014	1 May 2018
33		Kim Beazley	1 May 2018	30 June 2022
34		Chris Dawson	15 July 2022	Current
35		Ken Wyatt	February 2027	Designate

=== List of lieutenant-governors ===
The lieutenant-governor serves as deputy to the governor, fulfilling the governor's functions in the governor's absence.

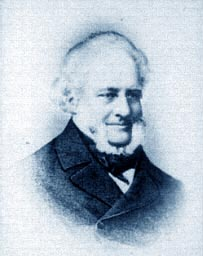
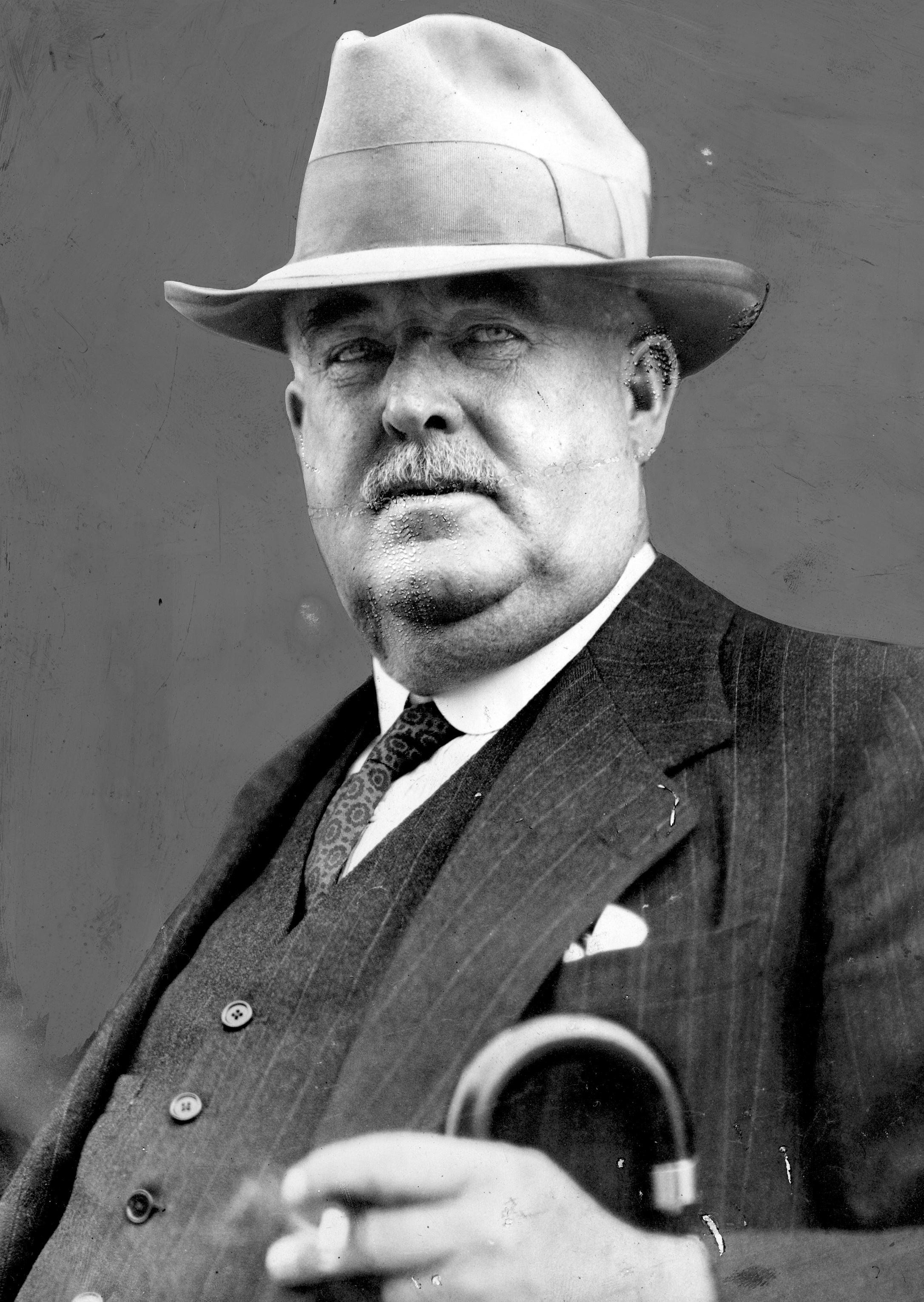
No.	Portrait	Lieutenant-Governor	From	To
1		Captain Sir James Stirling	30 December 1828	5 February 1832
...
N/A		Sir James Mitchell	1933	1948
...
N/A		Peter Quinlan	27 November 2019	Current
