= David Malcolm =

Australian judge

The Honourable David Malcolm AC QC

Chief Justice of Western Australia
- In office 26 May 1988 – 1 May 2006
- Preceded by: Sir Francis Burt
- Succeeded by: Wayne Martin

Lieutenant-Governor of Western Australia
- In office 26 February 1990 – 9 October 2009
- Monarch: Elizabeth II
- Governor: Sir Francis Burt (1990–1993); Michael Jeffery (1993–2000); John Sanderson (2000–2005); Ken Michael (2006–2009)
- Preceded by: Sir Francis Burt
- Succeeded by: Wayne Martin

Personal details
- Born: 6 May 1938 Bunbury, Western Australia
- Died: 20 October 2014 (aged 76) Perth, Western Australia
- Spouse: Kaaren Malcolm
- Children: Manisha Malcolm
- Education: University of Western Australia; Wadham College, Oxford

David Kingsley Malcolm, AC, QC (6 May 1938 – 20 October 2014) was the Chief Justice of Western Australia from May 1988 until his retirement from the bench in February 2006. He was also an expatriate justice of the Supreme Court of Fiji.

== Early life ==
Malcolm was born on 6 May 1938 in Bunbury, Western Australia. His father was a livestock salesman with Elder Smith & Co., while his mother, a teacher, was the granddaughter of Walkinshaw Cowan and niece by marriage of Edith Cowan.

Malcolm was educated at Guildford Grammar School and went on to the University of Western Australia, graduating Bachelor of Laws in 1959. He was chosen as Western Australia's Rhodes Scholar in 1960 and subsequently completed a Bachelor of Civil Law at Wadham College, Oxford.

== Legal career ==
Malcolm served his articles of clerkship in Perth with Stone James & Co., then joined Muir Williams Nicholson as a partner upon his admission to the bar in 1964. In 1967 he joined the Asian Development Bank's legal department in Manila. He remained with the ADB until 1970 as deputy general counsel and traveled widely in Asia.

After returning to Perth, Malcolm resumed his role in Muir Williams Nicholson's litigation department, up until its merger with Sydney firm Freehill Hollingdale & Page in 1979. He then joined the independent bar and was appointed Queen's Counsel in 1980. He regularly appeared before the Privy Council, and appeared as counsel on one of the last Australian appeals to the Privy Council before the Australia Act 1986 took effect. Malcolm was president of the Western Australian Bar Association from 1982 to 1984 and vice-president of the Australian Bar Association in 1984. He practised across a wide range of areas including "income tax, mining, shipping, equity, intellectual property and corporations law".

=== Chief Justice ===
He was appointed Chief Justice of the Supreme Court on the retirement of the widely respected Francis Burt. In 1990 he also became Lieutenant-Governor of the state.

Malcolm earned great respect during his time as Chief Justice, and received great acclaim from the legal profession on his retirement on 7 February 2006. However, during his final year on the bench he came under increasing pressure, by the media, for perceived failings on the bench after he aborted a murder trial.

At his farewell, the Attorney-General, Jim McGinty, commented on the landmark judgement that Malcolm had handed down in the appeal of John Button, a high-profile case in which a manslaughter conviction was quashed over 30 years after the event. Wayne Martin replaced Malcolm as Chief Justice, and Malcolm later became Professor of Law at the University of Notre Dame Australia, Fremantle.

== Death and legacy ==
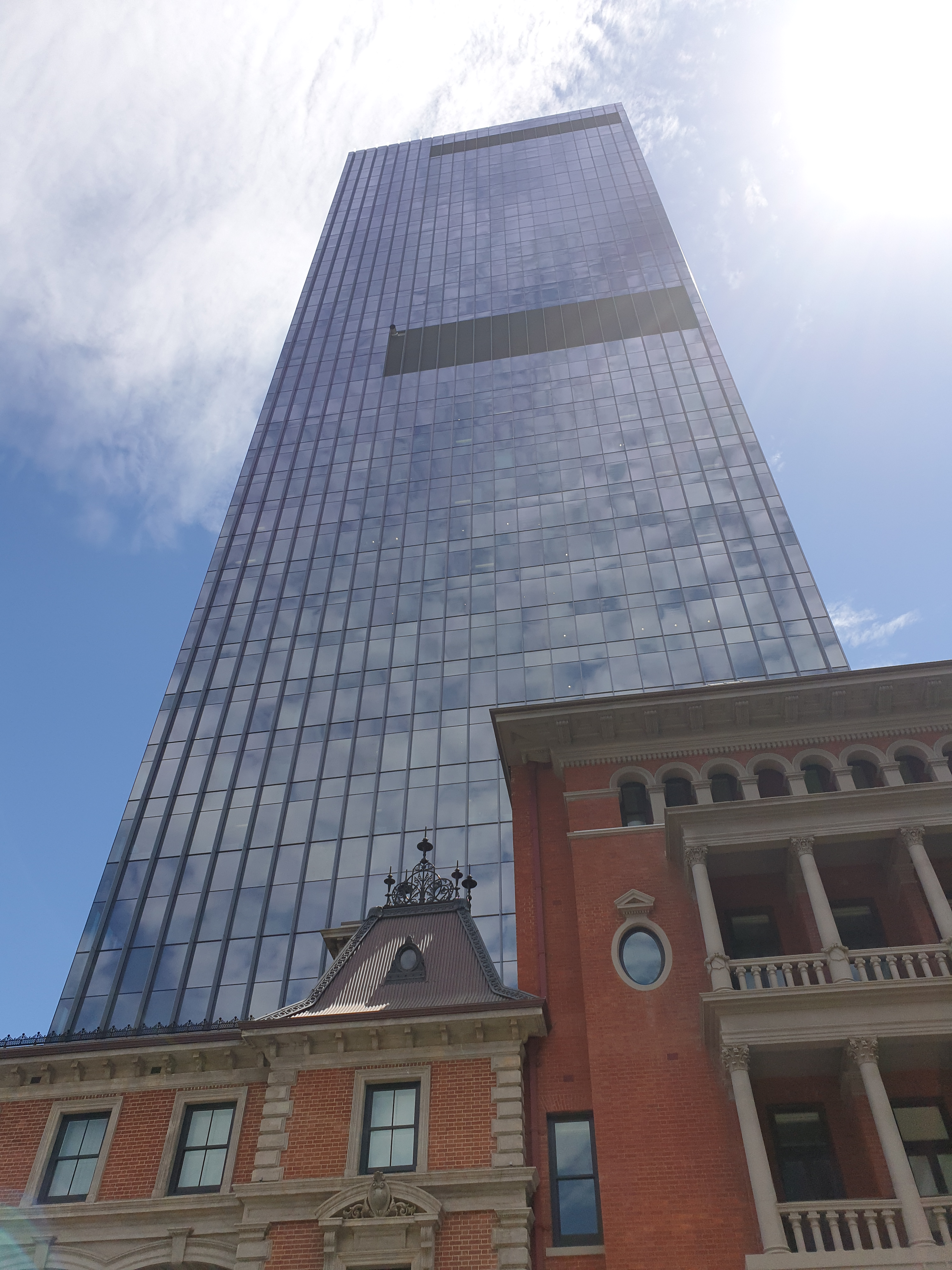
The David Malcolm Justice Centre

Malcolm died in Perth in October 2014, aged 76. The David Malcolm Justice Centre, a 33-storey skyscraper located on Cathedral Square in the Perth CBD, was named in his honour in 2016. The tower houses the civil arm of the Supreme Court and offices for the Department of the Attorney General and Department of Treasury.

== General references ==
- Taylor, Alister (ed) (1997) The Australian roll of honour : national honours & awards 1975–1996 Sydney, N.S.W. : Roll of Honour Publications, ISBN 0-908578-57-1 – item on Malcolm's AC 1992 for service to the law and to the Crown.

Legal offices
Preceded by Sir Francis Burt	Chief Justice of Western Australia; 1988–2006	Succeeded by Wayne Martin
