= David Malcolm Justice Centre =

Office building in Perth, Western Australia

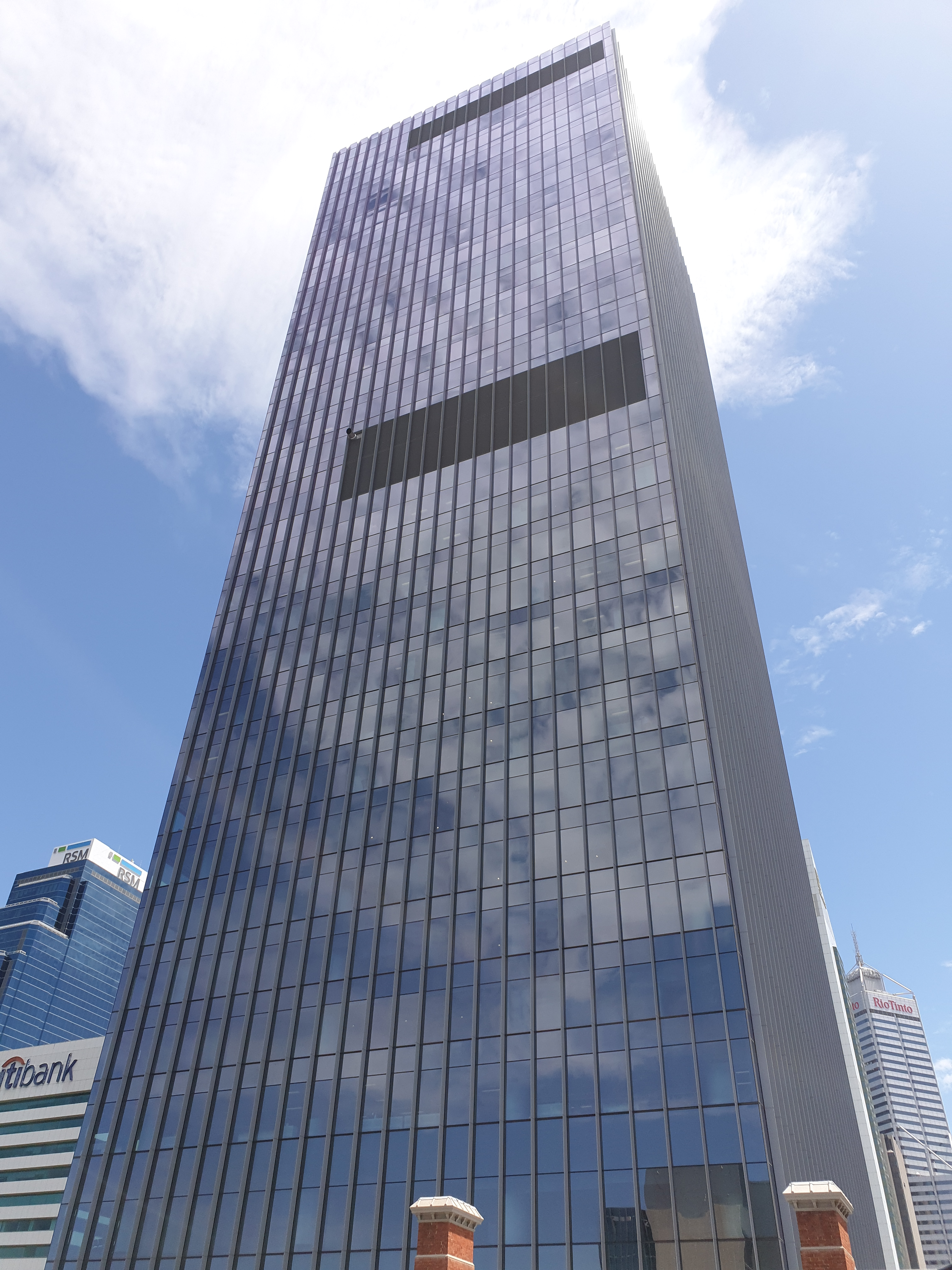
- Interactive map of the David Malcolm Justice Centre area

General information
- Status: Completed
- Location: Cathedral Square, 28 Barrack Street; Perth, Western Australia, Australia
- Coordinates: 31°57′18″S 115°51′37″E
- Current tenants: Supreme Court of Western Australia; Department of Treasury; Department of Justice
- Named for: David Malcolm
- Owner: Mirvac; Keppel REIT

Height
- Height: 149 m (489 ft)

Technical details
- Floor count: 32 to 35

Design and construction
- Architecture firm: Kerry Hill Architects and Hassell
- Main contractor: Mirvac

Other information
- Parking: 200

The David Malcolm Justice Centre is a 33-storey, 149-metre (489 ft) tall skyscraper on Barrack Street in Perth, Western Australia. The building is named after David Malcolm, a former chief justice of Western Australia, and houses civil courtrooms for the Supreme Court of Western Australia as well as office space for the Department of Treasury and the Department of Justice.

== History ==
In September 2012, Mirvac sold 50% of its stake in the building to Singaporean company Keppel REIT for A$165 million (equivalent to A$208 million in 2022).

Construction was completed in August 2015, with fit-out following that.

The building was officially named the David Malcolm Justice Centre by Premier Colin Barnett on 11 March 2016, after David Malcolm, a former chief justice of Western Australia for eighteen years.

The David Malcolm Justice Centre was officially opened on 29 June 2016. The official judicial opening occurred on 27 July 2016 with a ceremonial court sitting.

== Design ==
The David Malcolm Justice Centre is 32 to 35 storeys tall and has a height of 149 metres (489 ft) according to the Council on Tall Buildings and Urban Habitat, making it the fifth-tallest building in Perth. 32 storeys are habitable and the net lettable area is approximately 31,881 square metres (343,160 sq ft). The building ownership is split 50:50 between Mirvac and Keppel REIT.

The building is at the centre of the Cathedral Square precinct within the central business district of Perth. Next to the building is the heritage-listed Perth Town Hall and the Old Treasury Buildings, the latter of which had its central wing demolished to make way for the David Malcolm Justice Centre. The building was constructed on the site of the former R&I Bank building. Architecture Australia describes the building as an "elegant and timeless glazed tower, clearly intended not to compete with the heritage buildings".

The buildings main entrance is at the north-western corner, where there is a forecourt between the Perth Town Hall and the Old Treasury Building. There is a secondary, staff-only entrance on the northern side of the building as well.

The David Malcolm Justice Centre was designed for at least 50 years' use. Materials used include light wood and glass which make for a relaxing, rather than intimidating, environment. Malcolm had long wanted to provide a less intimidating environment for those going through the judicial process and that was his one main regret upon retiring as chief justice.

== Major tenants ==
The David Malcolm Justice Centre houses civil courtrooms for the Supreme Court of Western Australia. The original Supreme Court Building remains in use for appeals and criminal trials. It also has offices for the Department of Treasury and the Department of Justice (formerly the Department of the Attorney General). Levels two to sixteen are used by the Supreme Court and nineteen to thirty-one are used by the Department of Justice and the Department of Treasury.
