= City of Perth Library =

Public library in Perth, Western Australia

Coordinates: 31.9551°S 115.8612°E

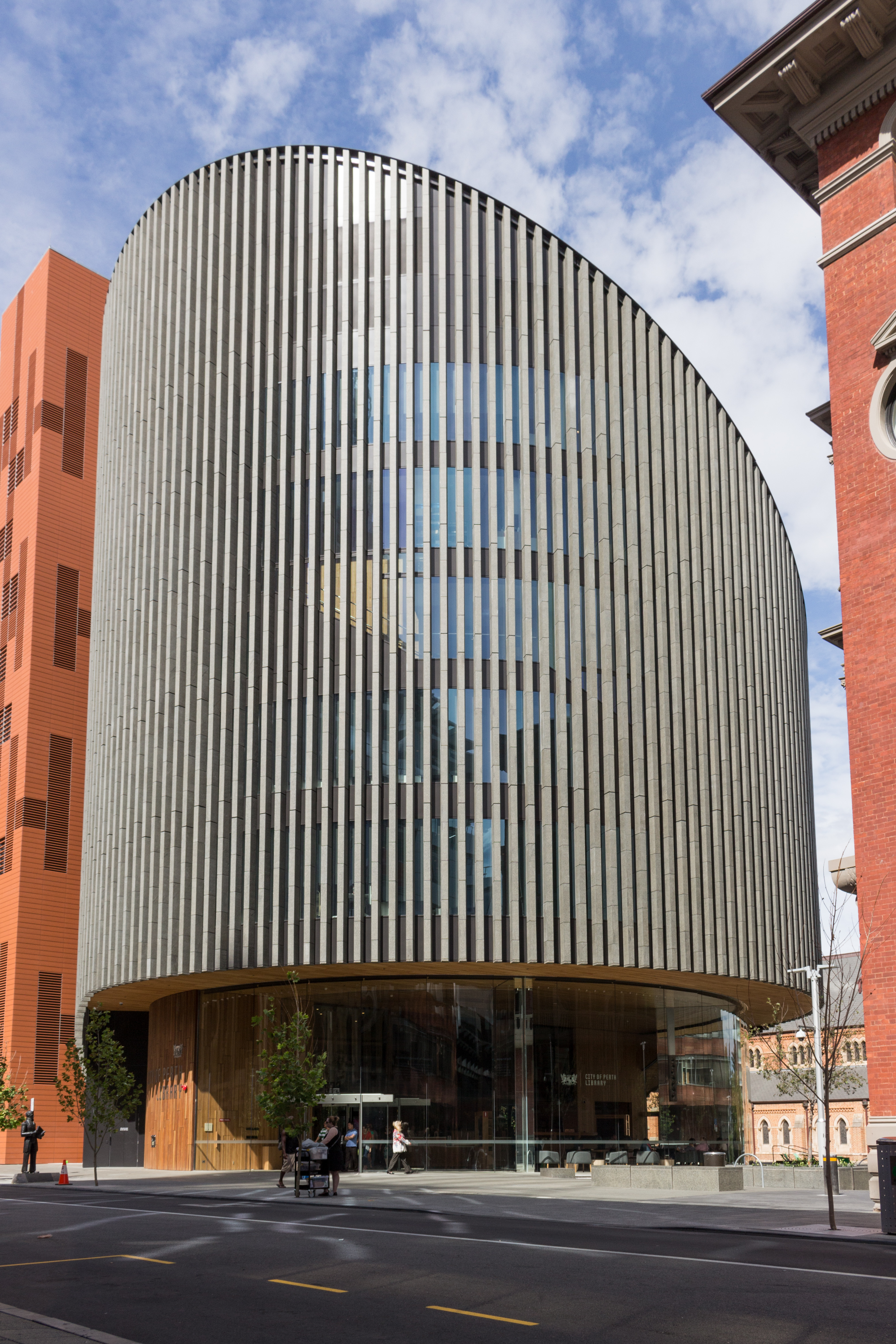
The City of Perth Library

The City of Perth Library is a public library service provided by the City of Perth. The library is located on Hay Street, next to the Perth Town Hall. It is part of the redevelopment of Cathedral Square, located between St Georges Terrace and Hay, Barrack and Pier Streets.

Prior to the completion of the current building in 2016, the library had been based at a number of locations, most recently 140 William Street in the Perth central business district.

The City of Perth library is separate in operations from the other major library in Perth, the State Library of Western Australia at the Alexander Library Building.

== History ==
The City of Perth Library has, since its inception, been housed in a number of locations. The site is situated where the library had previously been housed in a now demolished building, in the basement.

The earliest predecessor of the library was the Swan River Mechanics' Institute which was established in 1851. The name was changed in 1909 to Perth Literary Institute, and in 1957 the City of Perth renamed and took over the library as the City of Perth Library.

The subsequent buildings were Council House on St Georges Terrace (1963–1995), Law Chambers Building (1995–2012), and 140 William Street (2012–2015).

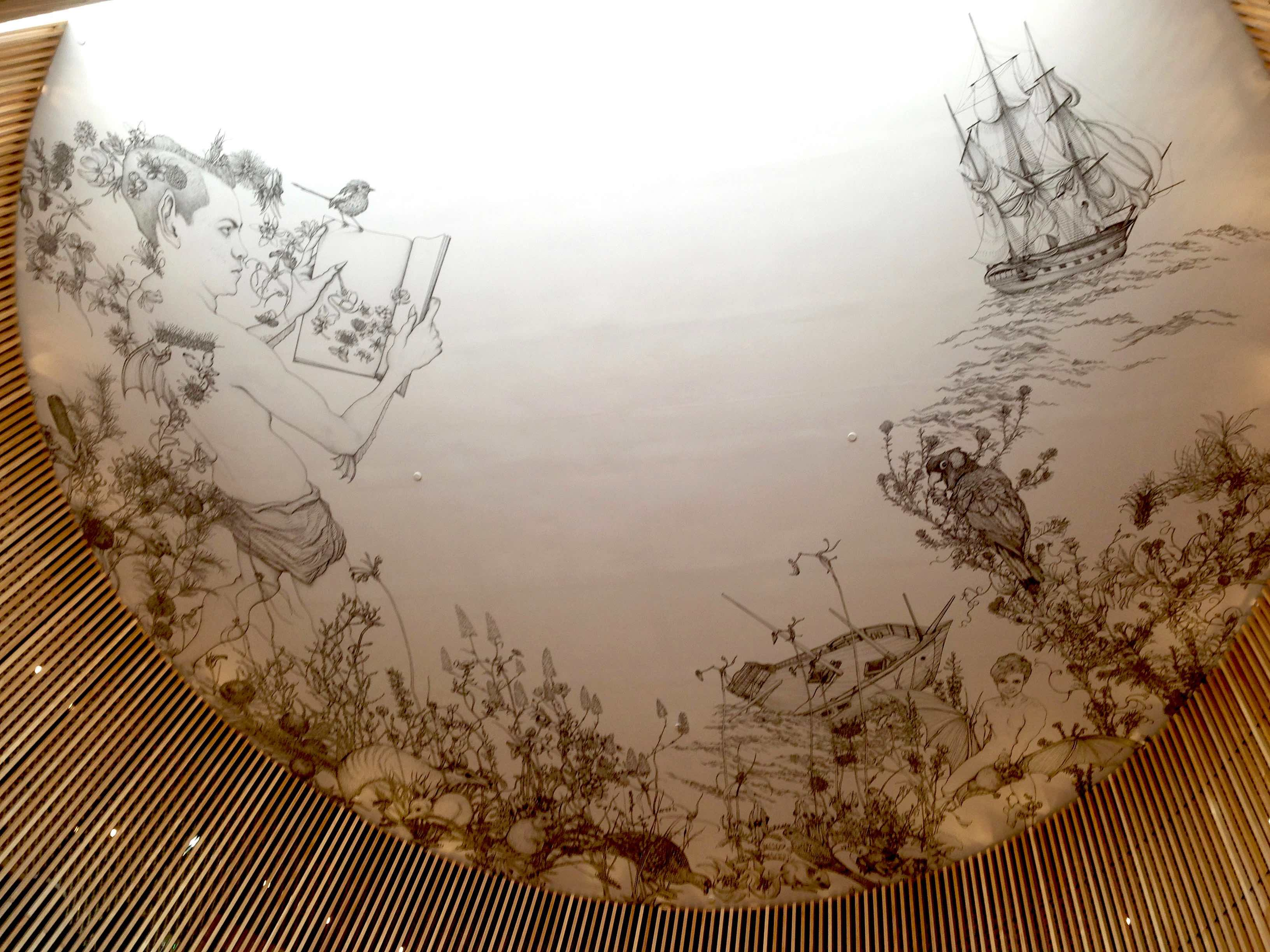
Delight and Hurt Not by Andrew Nicholls

=== Current building ===
Kerry Hill Architects were awarded the design tender for a new library in 2011. The City of Perth awarded the $33 million construction contract to Doric Contractors, which began building works in 2013. The library is the first civic building to be built by the City of Perth since the Perth Concert Hall in 1972. Completion was expected by the end of 2014. The new library opened on 1 March 2016.

The library has a circular design with seven floors, glass facades, and stone-clad columns. The building includes a 13-metre-tall (43 ft) vertical garden, the tallest in Perth, with more than 3500 plants. The ceiling features a mural by artist Andrew Nicholls entitled Delight and Hurt Not, depicting the final act of Shakespeare's The Tempest illustrated with Western Australian flora and fauna.

== Gallery ==
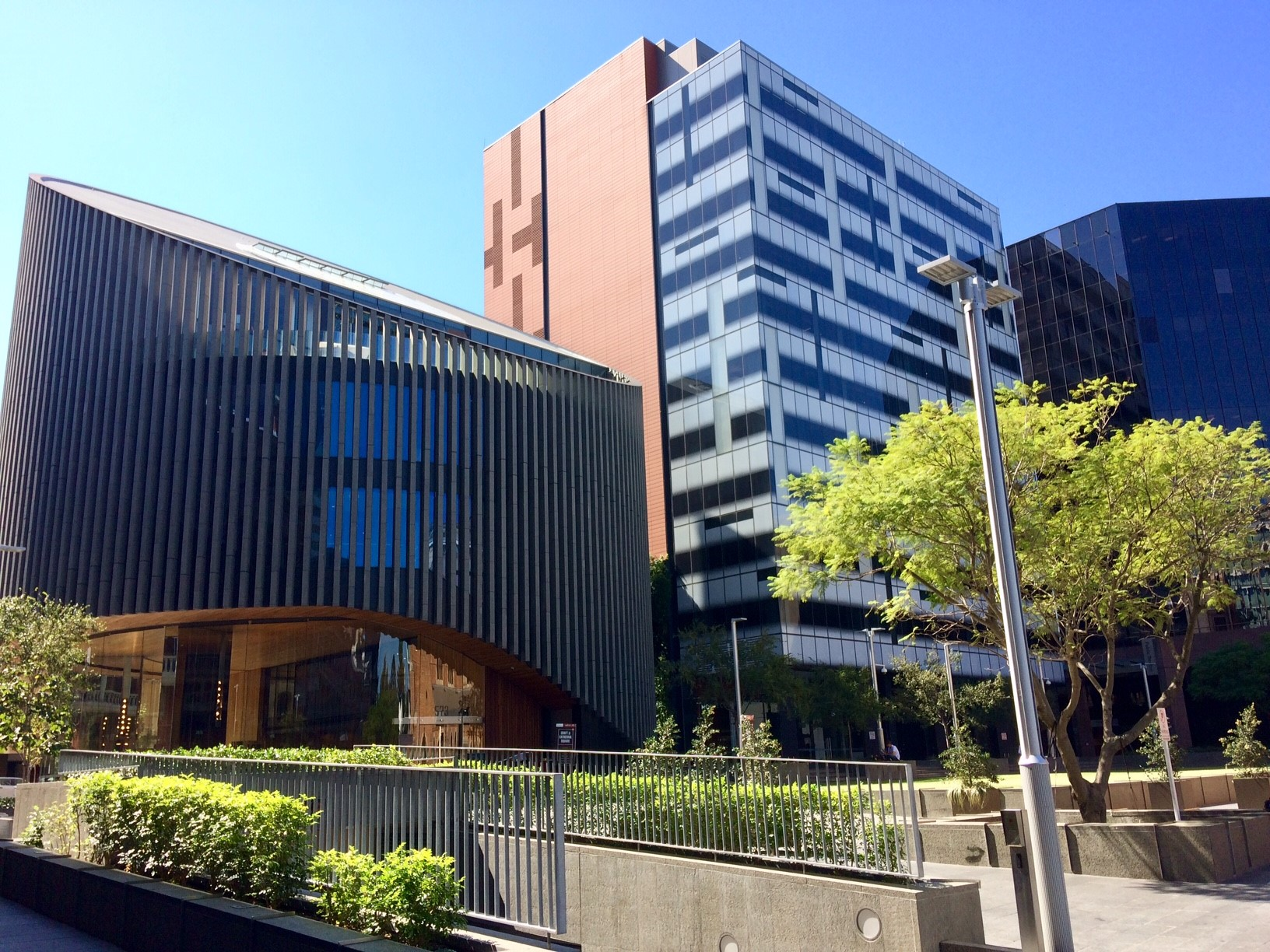
Northwest view of the Library

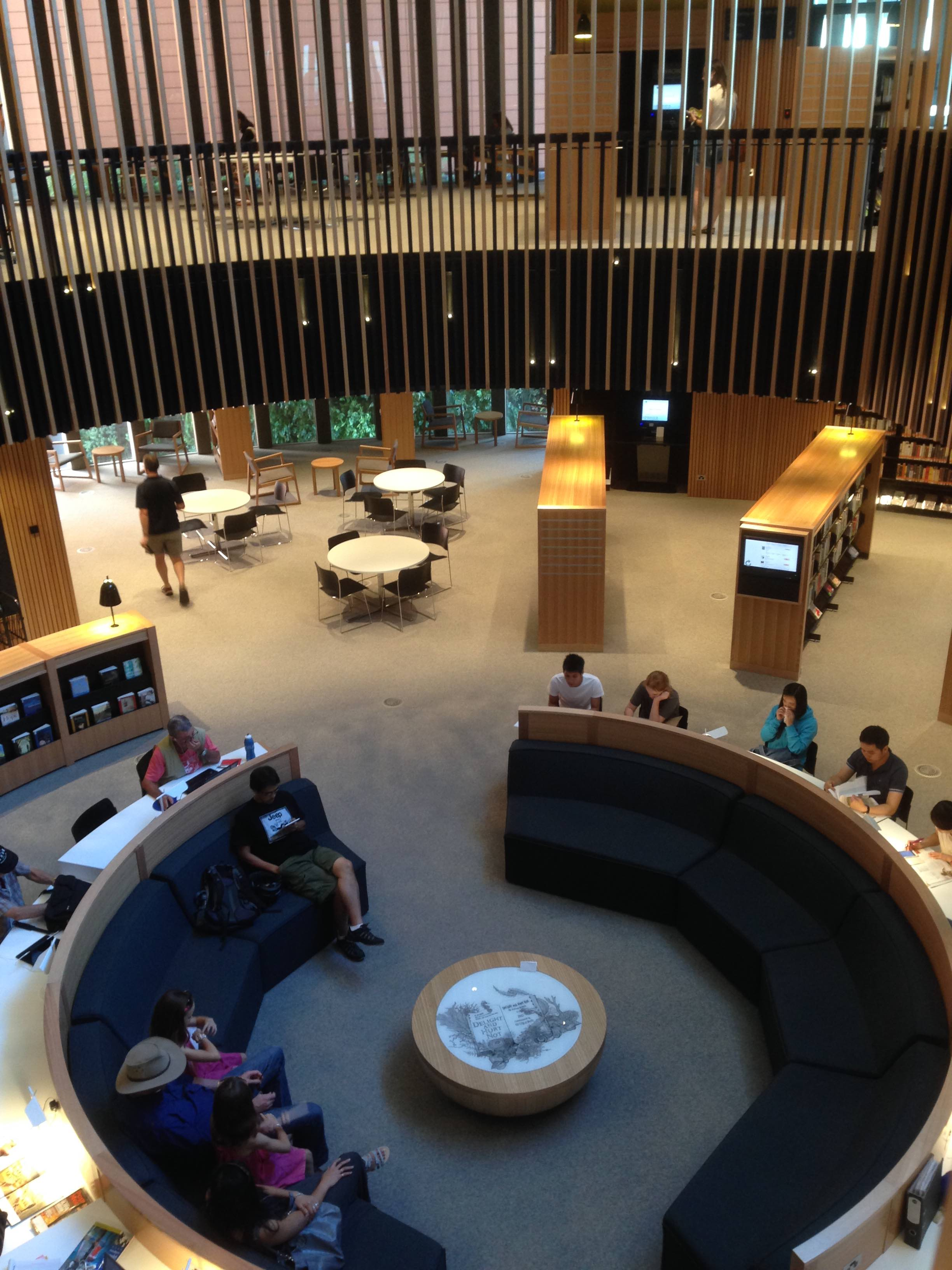
Level One of the library

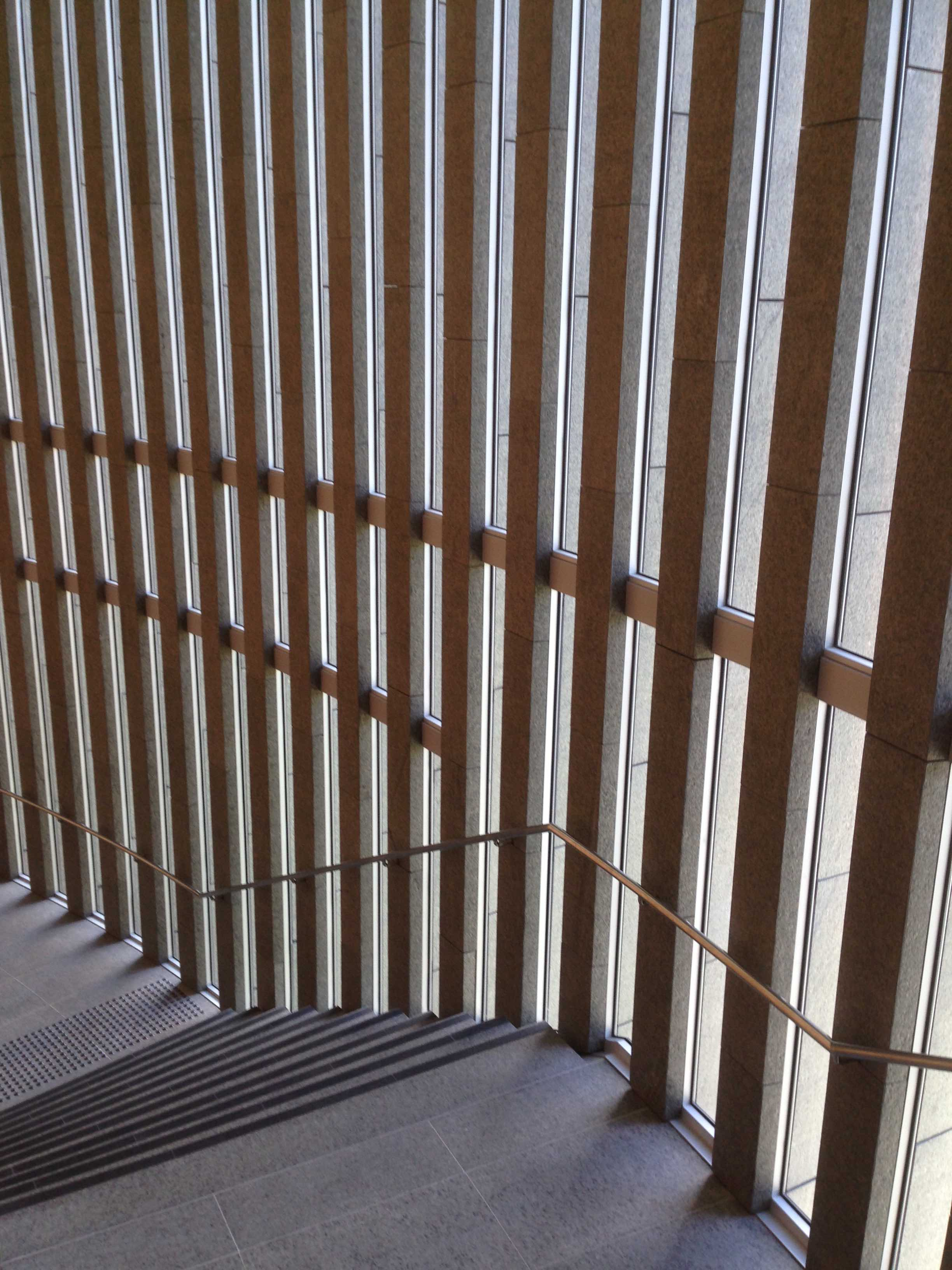
Staircase inside the library

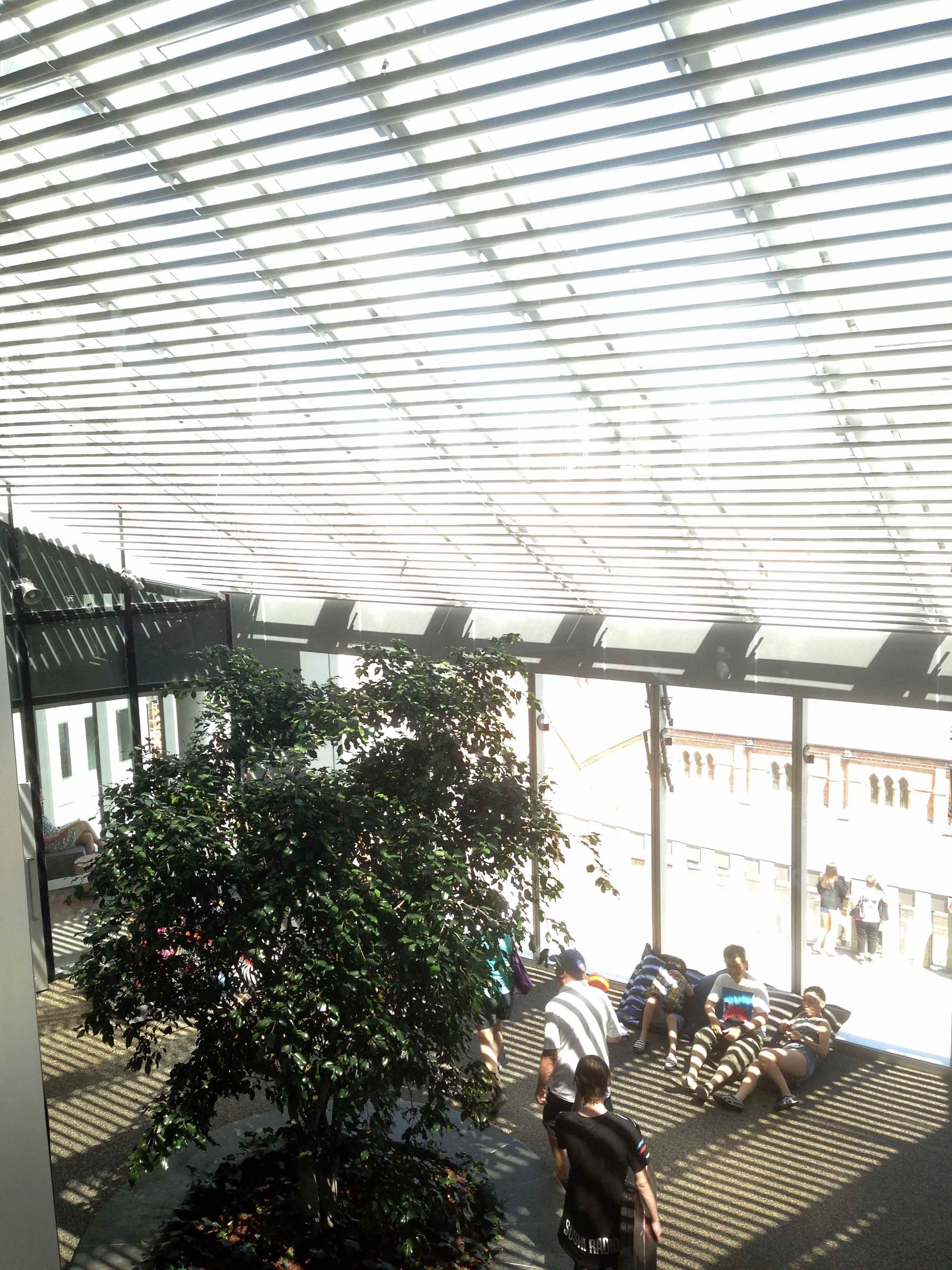
Tree of Knowledge

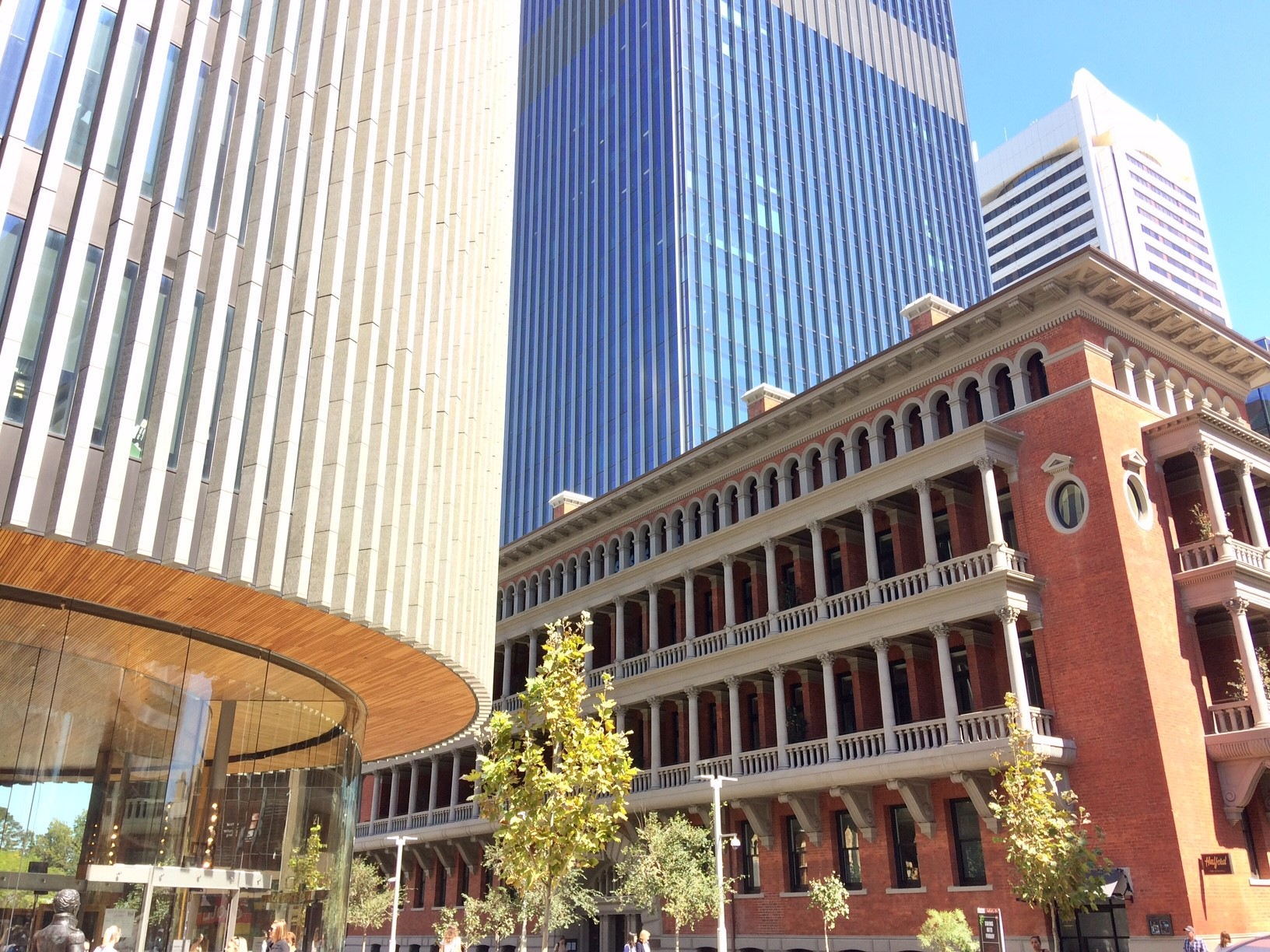
The Library and the State Buildings
