= Murder of Andrew Pea =

1978 murder in Perth, Australia

Andrew Pea (1956 - 1978), also known as Andrew Ronald Smith, was a 22-year-old Victorian who'd moved to Perth, Western Australia in 1975 and worked as a labourer for the State Energy Commission of Western Australia. Pea lived alone in a Salvation Army hostel in East Perth and was known as a casual drinker at many Perth inner-city hotels; being seen at various times in the Paddington, the Criterion, the Imperial, the Railway, the Globe and the Victoria. Pea’s murder shocked Perth as it was one of the first cases of gang-style killing in the city. Only two weeks prior to his murder Pea had been involved in another fight, in which he’d dislocated his shoulder.

== Murder ==
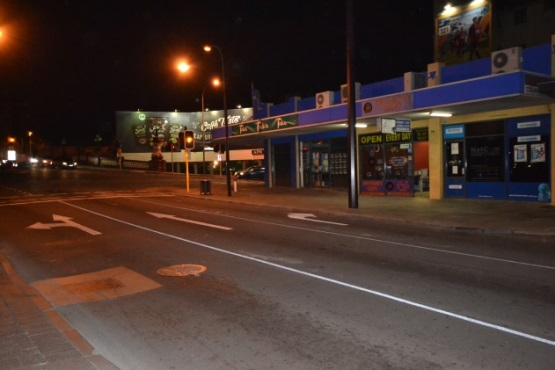
Murder scene, corner of Barrack and Wellington streets

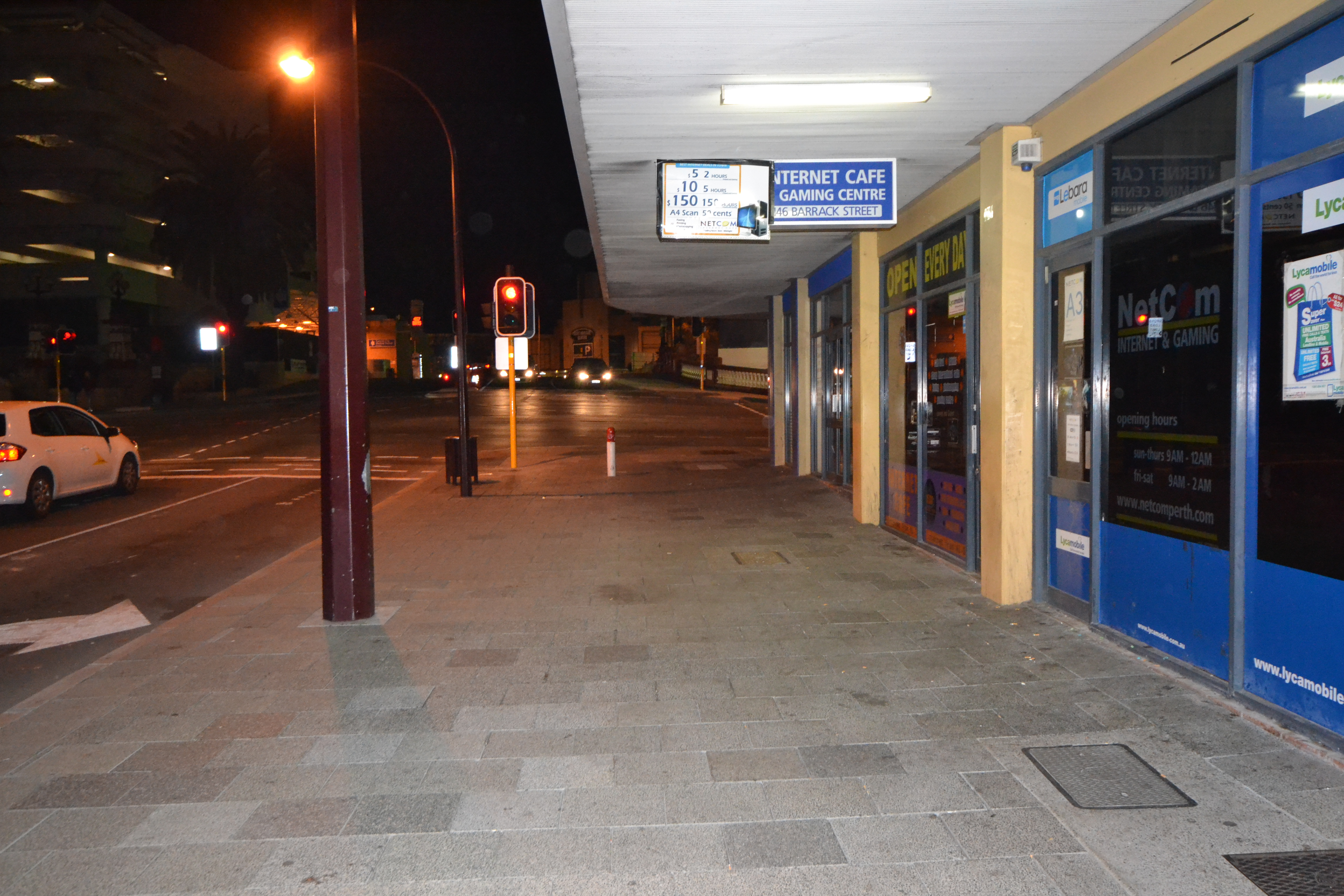
Murder scene

At 9pm on Saturday 1 July 1978 Pea was seen drinking in the Paddington Hotel's basement Tube Bar, which was described as being "dark and dingy with pool tables, that was frequented during the week by a strange mixture of people: poofters, lesbians, bikies and crims". Witnesses stated that Pea left the basement bar shortly after 9pm and walked to a nearby TAB betting shop to collect a bet in Barrack Street. The betting shop being located approximately 500m from the Paddington Hotel.

About 9.30pm Pea was seen by witnesses talking to a newsboy near the corner of Barrack and Wellington streets when a man approached Pea and told him not to hassle the newsboy, with one witness claiming to have heard Pea say "what's it got to do with you". A short fist fight then followed in which the significantly larger Pea (reported to be approximately 6’2 and over 110 kg) got the better of the man who was described as being 5’9 and of medium build. The fight ended with the smaller man seen running a few metres up Barrack Street towards Murray Street; while being overheard by witnesses muttering something about getting even. But within a matter of seconds the man had returned, and armed with a 10 cm pocketknife he'd been carrying walked back towards Pea and started "swinging wild" with the weapon, stabbing Pea in the head, back and chest 21 times and wielding the weapon with such force that it managed cut through Pea's skull and other bones (the fatal blows being those delivered to Pea's heart and through his ear into his brain).

According to reports a crowd of roughly 50 people witnessed the fatal attack, but stood back too frightened to act. However one man, Mark Forrest (a 20-year-old backpacker from Sydney), decided to intervene when he saw Pea slump to the ground and scream because "he looked beaten". In an attempt to have the assailant drop the knife Forrest dragged the man off Pea and slammed his head into the pavement up to half a dozen times. Despite his efforts the assailant managed to break free from Forrest, threaten him with the knife and run across the nearby Barrack Street Bridge. Forrest, and other bystanders, then pursued the assailant but lost him as he disappeared into the Northbridge nightclub district.

Police were called from all parts of the metropolitan area in an attempt to cut off the assailant’s escape route but failed to apprehend the attacker. Pea was rushed to nearby Royal Perth Hospital but died soon after arrival at about 9.57pm 1 July 1978. At the time of the post mortem examination analysed samples showed that Pea had 0.362% alcohol in his blood.

Mark Forrest was later awarded the Bravery Medal in November 1978 (medal number: 865694) for the courage he displayed in struggling with Pea’s killer.

== Investigation ==
According to reports the crime scene became "chaotic" immediately after Pea's murder, as large numbers of Saturday-night revellers poured over the poorly secured area. Adding to the confusion were conflicting details of the murderer being provided to police at the scene by the large group of witnesses; leading police detectives at the time to believe that more than one attacker may have been involved in Pea's death.

Despite the fact that there were dozens of eyewitnesses no arrests were made in the months following the murder; which was contrary to the initial belief of investigating police detectives that an arrest of the killer would only be a matter of hours. In December 1978, after almost six months of no progress in the case, Channel 9, assisted by WA Police ran a televised 30-minute re-enactment of the murder of Pea to try and generate new information. Despite a deluge of calls and having 11 police detectives manning phones the day after the re-enactment the investigation continued to stall. The case went unsolved for almost 10 years.

A breakthrough in the investigation came in early 1987 when new information was received by WA Police. After a nationwide six-month search by police detectives, on 8 October 1987, Peter Munckton (33) was arrested in Darwin, Northern Territory, where he’d been residing whilst on parole after an armed-robbery conviction committed in Darwin on 15 July 1980. Court documents, pertaining to the 1980 armed robbery trial, stated that Munckton, originally from Darwin, had left the city after completing an apprenticeship in mechanics in 1976 and then had travelled around Australia; finally arriving in Western Australia sometime in late 1977. It was during this time in Perth that Munckton had a serious motor-cycle accident resulting in extensive head injuries, subsequent epilepsy and loss of memory. For many months after the accident hospitalization was followed by out-patient and therapy treatment at Royal Perth Hospital. It was after one of these outpatient visits to Royal Perth Hospital that Pea's murder had been committed.

Post his arrest by WA Police in Darwin in 1987, Munckton is reported to have said to arresting police detectives "I’m glad I can finally tell someone about it" and stated that he had come close to giving himself up a number of times. Following extradition to Western Australia, on 29 August 1988 at the Supreme Court of Western Australia after pleading not guilty to wilful murder but guilty to the lesser crime of murder Munckton was sentenced to life imprisonment. Munckton's only variance with the facts as presented by the prosecution being that Pea was in some way the aggressor throughout.
