= Pinnacle House =

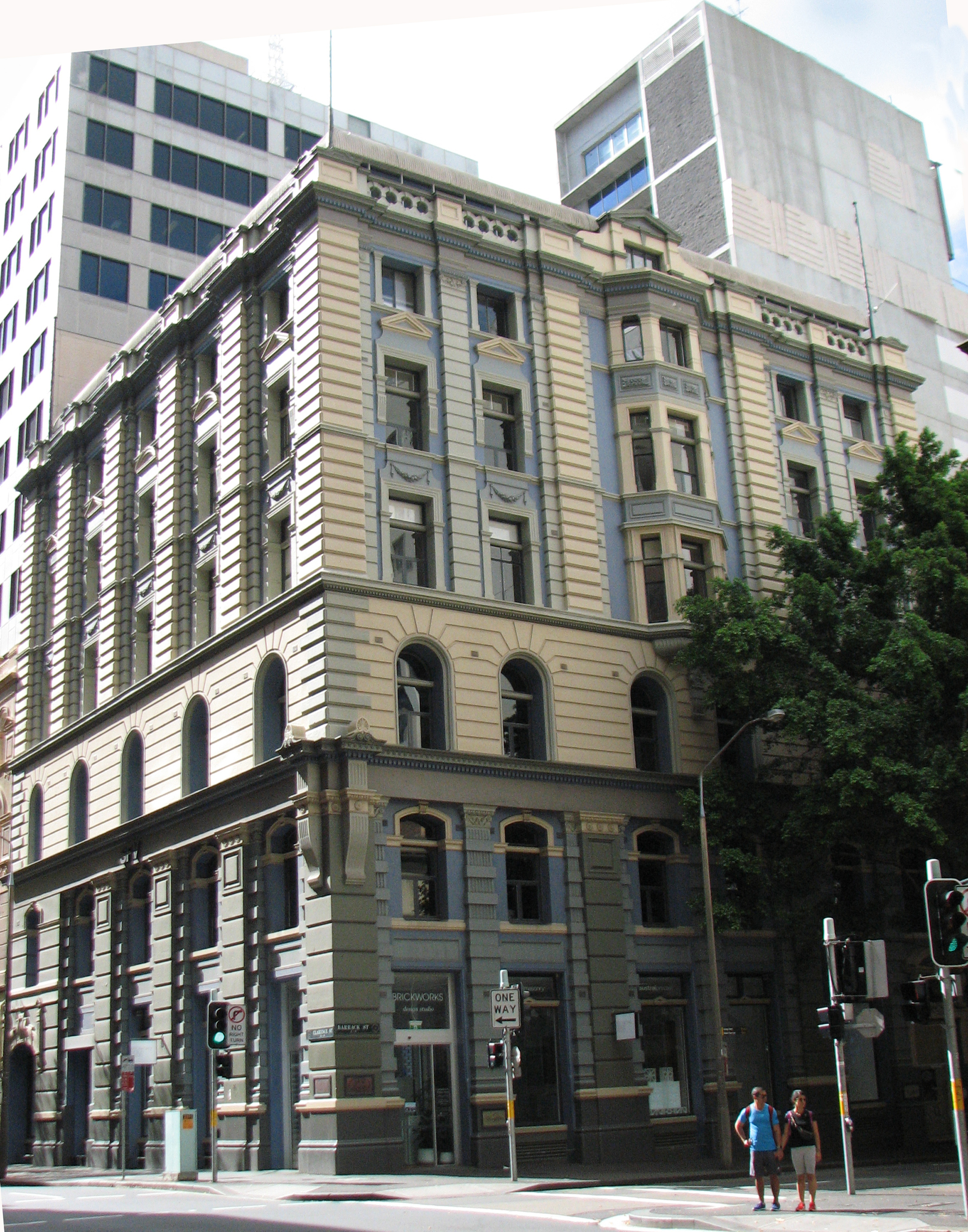
- Pinnacle House

- Location within Sydney Location within Australia
- 33.8675°S 151.2054°E
- Location: 2-6 Barrack Street, Sydney central business district, Australia

History
- Built: 1888–1892

Site notes
- Architect: Sheerin & Hennessy
- Architectural style: Victorian Free Classical

New South Wales Heritage Register
- Official name: Pinnacle House
- Type: State heritage (built)
- Designated: 2 April 1999
- Reference no.: 582
- Type: Warehouse/storage area
- Category: Commercial
- Builders: Allum Brothers

Pinnacle House is a heritage-listed former warehouse at 2-6 Barrack Street, in the Sydney central business district, in the City of Sydney local government area of New South Wales, Australia. It was designed by Sheerin & Hennessy and built from 1888 to 1892 by Allum Brothers. It was added to the New South Wales State Heritage Register on 2 April 1999.

== History ==
The site was purchased in 1888 by Frederick David Michailis and his brother-in-law Cosmann Nettheim. In the same year they mortgaged the property to the AMP Society, evidently to raise the funds for the construction of the warehouse. The building was completed by 1892, when it was leased to Moritz Geldelf (related by marriage to the Michailis family).

Sheerin and Hennessy, the designers of the warehouse, also provided designs for major commercial clients including Hordern Bros and Tooheys. The inner structure has iron columns and steel girders. Haltenstein's iron fire proof shutters were fixed across all staircases and lift openings. The ceilings were lined with pressed metal. The basement and ground floor originally had strong rooms. Entrances for cart docks faced Clarence Street and York Lane, with the principle entrance to the warehouse being from Barrack Street. Allum Brothers were the building contractors.

Gordon & Gotch Sacquired the building's lease in 1917 and occupied it for forty years from 1918. Some internal modifications were undertaken: a new entrance in 1926, new show window in 1935, alterations to the cart dock in 1924 and 1950, and various changes to windows. Further alterations were made following purchase of the property by the AMP Society in 1958, with the basement converted to car parking. Extensive renovation and alterations were carried out in 1971.

== Description ==
Pinnacle House was constructed in 1892 to the design of Sheerin & Hennessy. It is an 8-level warehouse in the Victorian Free Classical style, now used for commercial office space. The building has an internal structure of cast iron columns and wrought iron beams. In 1985, the building was substantially refurbished by Leightons, including the present roof structure, new lifts, fire stairs, suspended ceilings and internal services and finishes.

== Heritage listing ==
2 Barrack Street is a distinctive seven-story building constructed in 1892 by the architectural firm Sheerin & Hennessey, a firm that made a considerable contribution to the character of Victorian and Edwardian Sydney. The building previously served as principle offices for notable companies including Gordon & Gotch and Mauri Bros & Thompson. The building occupies and enhances a corner site in a precinct dominated by buildings of this type which served Darling Harbour as a working port. Rendered stucco masonry walls are deeply grooved with a variety of decorative motifs including fluted brackets, bay windows, pediments and swags.

Pinnacle House was listed on the New South Wales State Heritage Register on 2 April 1999.

== See also ==
- Australian non-residential architectural styles
