= List of acts of the Parliament of Western Australia from 1893 =

This is a list of acts of the Parliament of Western Australia for the year 1893.

== 1893 ==
=== Public acts ===
Short title, or popular name	Citation	Royal assent
Long title
	56 Vict. No. 1	13 January 1893
An Act to apply a sum out of the Consolidated Revenue to the Service of the Six Months ending the last day of June, One thousand eight hundred and ninety-three, and to appropriate the Supplies granted in this Session of Parliament.
	56 Vict. No. 2	13 January 1893
An Act to confirm certain Expenditure for the year One thousand eight hundred and ninety-one.
	56 Vict. No. 3	13 January 1893
An Act to amend the Land Regulations proclaimed on the 2nd March, 1887.
Safety of Defences Act 1892	56 Vict. No. 4	13 January 1893
An Act to prevent the Unauthorised Disclosure of Information relating to the Defences of Western Australia.
Industrial and Reformatory Schools Act 1893	56 Vict. No. 5	13 January 1893
An Act to provide for the Establishment of Industrial and Reformatory Schools.
Perth Railway Crossing Improvement Act 1892	56 Vict. No. 6	13 January 1893
An Act to authorise the Closing of all Rights-of-way across the Railway in Beaufort Street and Stirling Street respectively, in the City of Perth.
Public Institutions and Friendly Societies Lands Improvement Act 1892	56 Vict. No. 7	13 January 1893
An Act to empower Trustees of certain Public and other Institutions to raise Money on Lands by way of Mortgage.
Companies Act 1893	56 Vict. No. 8	13 January 1893
An Act to consolidate and amend the Law relating to Companies.
Jury Exemption Act 1892	56 Vict. No. 9	
Police Act Amendment Act 1893	56 Vict. No. 10	
Bills of Sale Amendment Act 1893	56 Vict. No. 11	
Federal Council Referring Act (Western Australia) Act 1893	56 Vict. No. 12	
Scab Act 1891 Amendment Act 1893	56 Vict. No. 13	
Transfer of Land Act 1893	56 Vict. No. 14	
Aboriginal Offenders Act (Amendment) 1893	56 Vict. No. 15	
Fremantle Harbour Works and Tramway Act 1893	56 Vict. No. 16	
Officers of Parliament Act 1893	56 Vict. No. 17	
Defence Forces Act 1893	56 Vict. No. 18	13 January 1893
An Act to make better provision for the Defence and Military requirements of the Colony of Western Australia.
Midland Railway Loan Act 1893	56 Vict. No. 19	13 January 1893
An Act to authorise the Colonial Treasurer to guarantee the payment of a Loan to be raised by the Midland Railway Company of Western Australia (Limited), for the purpose of completing a line of Railway from Guildford to Walkaway, on the Greenough Flats.
	57 Vict. No. 1	28 July 1893
An Act to apply out of the Consolidated Revenue Fund the sum of One Hundred Thousand Pounds (Note: £100,000 in 1893 is equivalent to A$17,300,000 in 2022.) to the Service of the Year ending 30th June, 1894.
Treasury Bills Act 1893	57 Vict. No. 2	
Post Office Savings Bank Consolidation Act 1893	57 Vict. No. 3	
Stock Tax Act 1893	57 Vict. No. 4	
Post and Telegraph Act 1893	57 Vict. No. 5	
Grand Jury Abolition Act Amendment Act 1893	57 Vict. No. 6	
Public Depositors' Relief Act 1893	57 Vict. No. 7	
Criminal Law Appeal Act 1893	57 Vict. No. 8	
Real Estates Administration Act 1893	57 Vict. No. 9	
Loan Act 1893	57 Vict. No. 10	
Tariff Act 1893	57 Vict. No. 11	
Legal Practitioners Act 1893	57 Vict. No. 12	
	57 Vict. No. 13	13 October 1893
An Act to apply a sum out of the Consolidated Revenue to the Service of the Year ending the last day of June, One thousand eight hundred and ninety-four, and to appropriate the Supplies granted in this Session of Parliament.
Constitution Act Amendment Act 1893	57 Vict. No. 14	
Electoral Act 1893	57 Vict. No. 15	13 October 1893
An Act to amend "The Electoral Act, 1889." (Note: Electoral Act 1889 (53 Vict. No. 23))
Elementary Education Act 1871 Amendment Act 1893	57 Vict. No. 16	
Railways Amendment Act 1893	57 Vict. No. 17	
Homesteads Act 1893	57 Vict. No. 18	
	57 Vict. No. 19	13 October 1893
An Act to abolish the Townsite of Greenbushes.
Water Supply Act 1893	57 Vict. No. 20	13 October 1893
An Act to regulate the Use and Supply of Water on Crown Lands.
	57 Vict. No. 21	13 October 1893
An Act to confirm certain Expenditure for the year One thousand eight hundred and ninety-two.
Destructive Birds and Animals Act 1893	57 Vict. No. 22	
Kensington Lane Closure Act 1893	57 Vict. No. 23	13 October 1893
An Act to make it lawful to close up a certain Street in the City of Perth.
Fremantle Water Supply Act 1893	57 Vict. No. 24	
Wines, Beer, and Spirit Sale Act 1880 Amendment Act 1893	57 Vict. No. 25	
	57 Vict. No. 26	13 October 1893
An Act to repeal "The Immigration Act, 1883." (Note: Immigration Act 1883 (47 Vict. No. 24))
Public Institutions and Friendly Societies Lands Improvement Act 1892 Amendment Act 1893	57 Vict. No. 27	
Distillation Act 1871 Amendment Act 1893	57 Vict. No. 28	
Eastern Railway Improvement Act 1893	57 Vict. No. 29	13 October 1893
An Act to authorise the Construction of certain Lines of Railway in connection with, or in lieu of certain portions of, the Eastern Railway.
Mineral Lands Act 1892 Amendment Act 1893	57 Vict. No. 30	
Stamp Act 1882 Amendment Act 1893	57 Vict. No. 31	13 October 1893
An Act to amend "The Stamp Act, 1882." (Note: Stamp Act 1882 (46 Vict. No. 6))
	57 Vict. No. 32	13 October 1893
An Act to amend the Law relating to Chinese Immigration.
Public Health Act 1886 Further Amendment Act 1893	57 Vict. No. 33	
Electoral Rolls Act 1893	57 Vict. No. 34	22 December 1893
An Act to authorise the immediate Preparation of the new Electoral Rolls to be compiled in accordance with "The Constitution Act Amendment Act, 1893," (Note: Constitution Act Amendment Act 1893 (57 Vict. No. 14)) and for other purposes.

=== Private acts ===
Short title, or popular name	Citation	Royal assent
Long title
West Australian Trustee Executor and Agency Company Limited Act 1893 or the West Australian Trustees Limited Act 1893 (repealed)	56 Vict. Private Act	13 January 1893
An Act to confer Powers upon the West Australian Trustee Executor and Agency Company, Limited. (Repealed by Trustee Companies Act 1987 (No. 111))
Perth Gas Company's Act 1886 Amendment Act 1892	56 Vict. Private Act	13 January 1893
An Act to amend "The Perth Gas Company's Act, 1886," and to extend the Powers and Privileges of the Company.
Church of England Lands Vesting Act 1892 or the Anglican Church of Australia Lands Vesting Act 1892	56 Vict. Private Act	13 January 1893
An Act to vest in "The Perth Diocesan Trustees ~~of the Church of England in Western Australia~~" Perth Building Lots Nos. 1 and 2, Section E, and to empower the said Trustees to sell the said lands, and for other purposes.
Fremantle Gas and Coke Company's Act 1886 Amendment Act 1893	56 Vict. Private Act	13 October 1893
An Act to amend "The Fremantle Gas and Coke Company's Act, 1886," (Note: Fremantle Gas and Coke Company's Act 1886 (50 Vict. No. 34)) and to extend the Powers and Privileges of the Company

== Sources ==
- "legislation.wa.gov.au".
