= List of acts of the Parliament of Western Australia from 1906 =

This is a list of acts of the Parliament of Western Australia for the year 1906.

== 1906 ==
Short title, or popular name	Citation	Royal assent
Long title
	No. 1 of 1906	2 August 1906
An Act to apply out of the Consolidated Revenue Fund and from Moneys to Credit of the General Loan Fund the sum of Five Hundred and Sixty-four Thousand Seven Hundred and Forty-eight Pounds to the Service of the Year ending 30th June, 1907.
	No. 2 of 1906	27 August 1906
An Act to validate certain Rates made by the Council of the Municipality of Collie and the Collie Local Board of Health, for the year ending the thirty-first day of October, 1905, and to validate the confirmation of the report of the Special Auditor for the Municipality of Esperance.
Fremantle Reserves Act 1906	No. 3 of 1906	27 August 1906
An Act to authorise the Sale of certain Lands vested in the Mayor and Councillors of the Municipality of Fremantle.
Nelson Agricultural Society Land Act 1906	No. 4 of 1906	
Reserves Act 1906	No. 5 of 1906	
Prisons Amendment Act 1906	No. 6 of 1906	
Stamp Act Amendment Act 1906	No. 7 of 1906	
Public Works Amendment Act 1906	No. 8 of 1906	
Government Savings Bank Act 1906 or the State Savings Bank Act 1906	No. 9 of 1906	
Second-hand Dealers Act 1906	No. 10 of 1906	
	No. 11 of 1906	
Stock Diseases Amendment Act 1906	No. 12 of 1906	
Bills of Sale Amendment Act 1906	No. 13 of 1906	
Municipal Institutions Act Amendment Act 1906	No. 14 of 1906	
Agricultural Bank Act 1906	No. 15 of 1906	
Bread Amendment Act 1906	No. 16 of 1906	
	No. 17 of 1906	
	No. 18 of 1906	
Reserves Act (No. 2) 1906	No. 19 of 1906	
Loan Act 1906	No. 20 of 1906	
Coolgardie–Norseman Railway Act 1906	No. 21 of 1906	14 December 1906
An Act to authorise the construction of a Railway from Coolgardie to Norseman.
Hopetoun–Ravensthorpe Railway Act 1906	No. 22 of 1906	14 December 1906
An Act to authorise the construction of a Railway from Hopetoun to Ravensthorpe.
Donnybrook–Preston Valley Railway Act 1906	No. 23 of 1906	14 December 1906
An Act to authorise the construction of a Railway from Donnybrook via Preston Valley to Upper Blackwood.
Greenhills–Quairading Railway Act 1906	No. 24 of 1906	14 December 1906
An Act to authorise the construction of a Railway from Greenhills to Quairading.
Jandakot–Armadale Railway Act 1906	No. 25 of 1906	14 December 1906
An Act to authorise the Construction of a Railway from Jandakot to Armadale.
Health Act Amendment Act 1906	No. 26 of 1906	
	No. 27 of 1906	
Evidence Act 1906	No. 28 of 1906	
Land Act Amendment Act 1906	No. 29 of 1906	
Dividend Duties Amendment Act 1906	No. 30 of 1906	
Criminal Code Amendment Act 1906	No. 31 of 1906	
Municipal Corporations Act 1906	No. 32 of 1906	
Boat Licensing Amendment Act 1906	No. 33 of 1906	
Perth Railway Crossing Amendment Act 1906	No. 34 of 1906	14 December 1906
An Act to amend the Perth Railway Crossing Improvement Act, 1892. (Note: Perth Railway Crossing Improvement Act 1892 (56 Vict. No. 6))
Fremantle Harbour Trust Amendment Act 1906	No. 35 of 1906	14 December 1906
An Act to amend the Fremantle Harbour Trust Act, 1902. (Note: Fremantle Harbour Trust Act 1902 (2 Edw. VII. No. 17))
Mines Regulation Act 1906	No. 36 of 1906	14 December 1906
An Act to provide for the Inspection and Regulation of Mines.

== Sources ==
- "legislation.wa.gov.au".
