= Cathedral Square, Perth =

Precinct in Perth, Western Australia

Coordinates: 31.9555°S 115.861°E

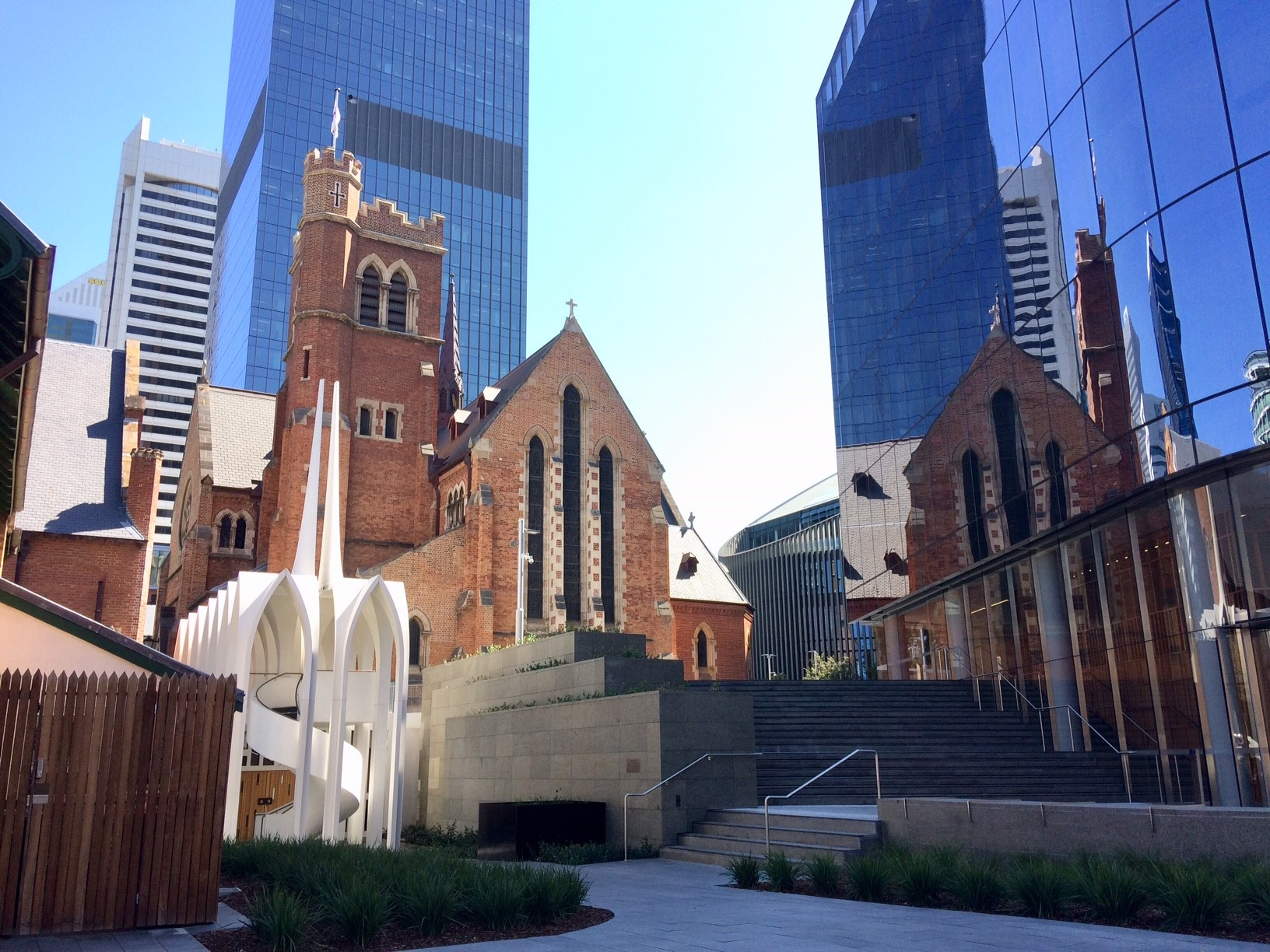
St George's Cathedral, Cadogan Song School, Church House, City of Perth Library and the David Malcolm Justice Centre

Cathedral Square is a precinct in the central business district of Perth, Western Australia, bounded by Hay Street to the north, Pier Street to the east, St Georges Terrace to the south, and Barrack Street to the west.

Located within the Cathedral Square precinct is the eponymous St George's Cathedral, Cadogan Song School, The Deanery, Burt Memorial Hall, Church House (containing the Anglican Diocese of Perth), City of Perth Library, the Perth Town Hall, the State Administrative Tribunal and the Public Trustee Building.

The State Buildings are located on the south west corner of the square, which include the COMO The Treasury hotel, restaurants, bars and retail. Behind these sits the David Malcolm Justice Centre, a 33-storey skyscraper containing civil courtrooms for the Supreme Court of Western Australia and offices for the Department of Treasury and the Department of Justice.

A number of buildings within the precinct, including the City of Perth Library, Church House, the redevelopment of the State Buildings and the David Malcolm Justice Centre were designed by Perth-firm Kerry Hill Architects.

The precinct includes the site of Perth's 'Point Zero', the marker from which all distances to and from Perth are measured worldwide.

Earlier names for the block included simply the names of Barrack Street and Pier Street, Cathedral and Treasury precinct and more recently Cathedral Precinct.

The newer name of Cathedral Square is used by the Anglican Cathedral administration, as well as by the promoters of the newer and heritage buildings within the area.

== Gallery ==
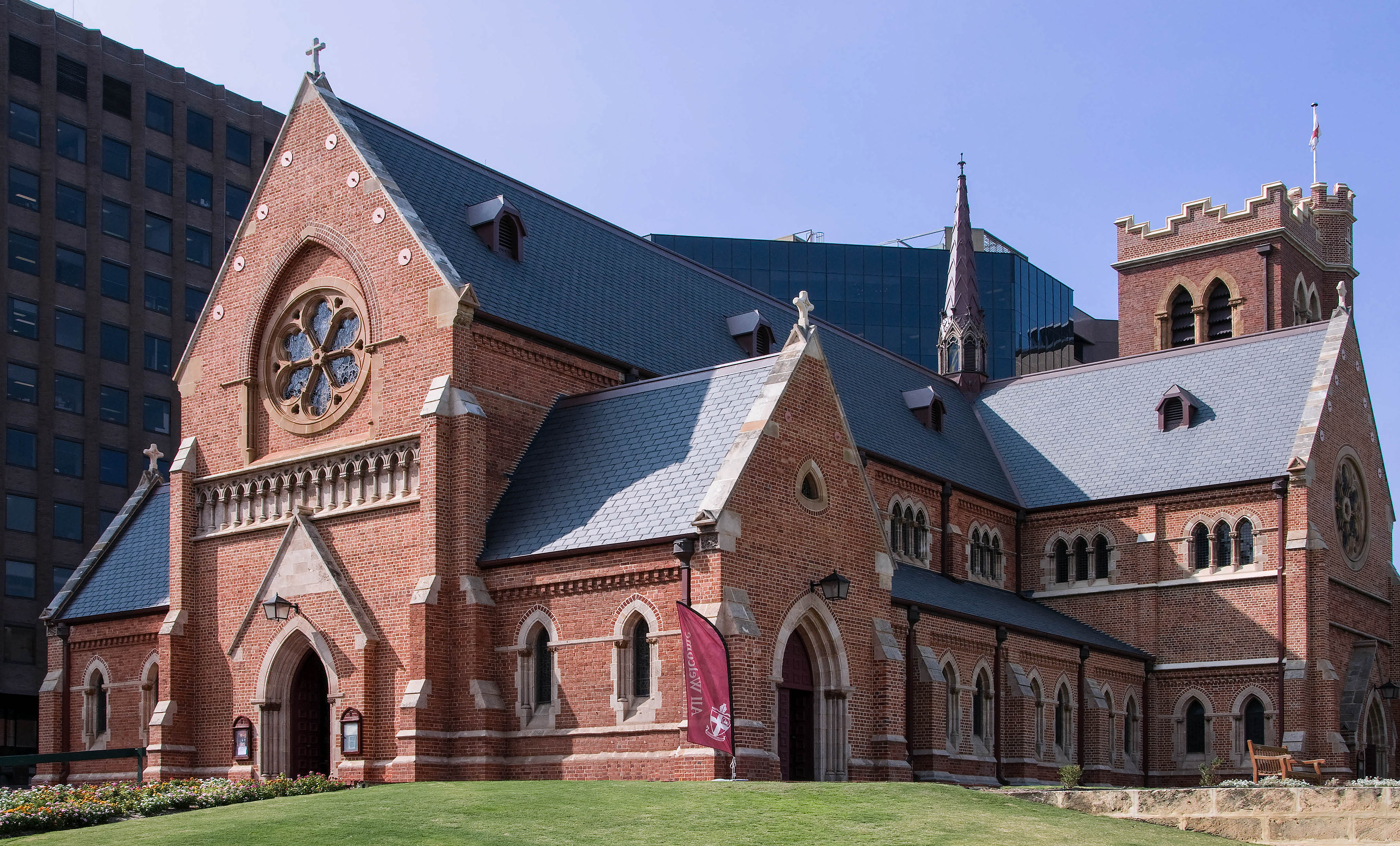
St George's Cathedral

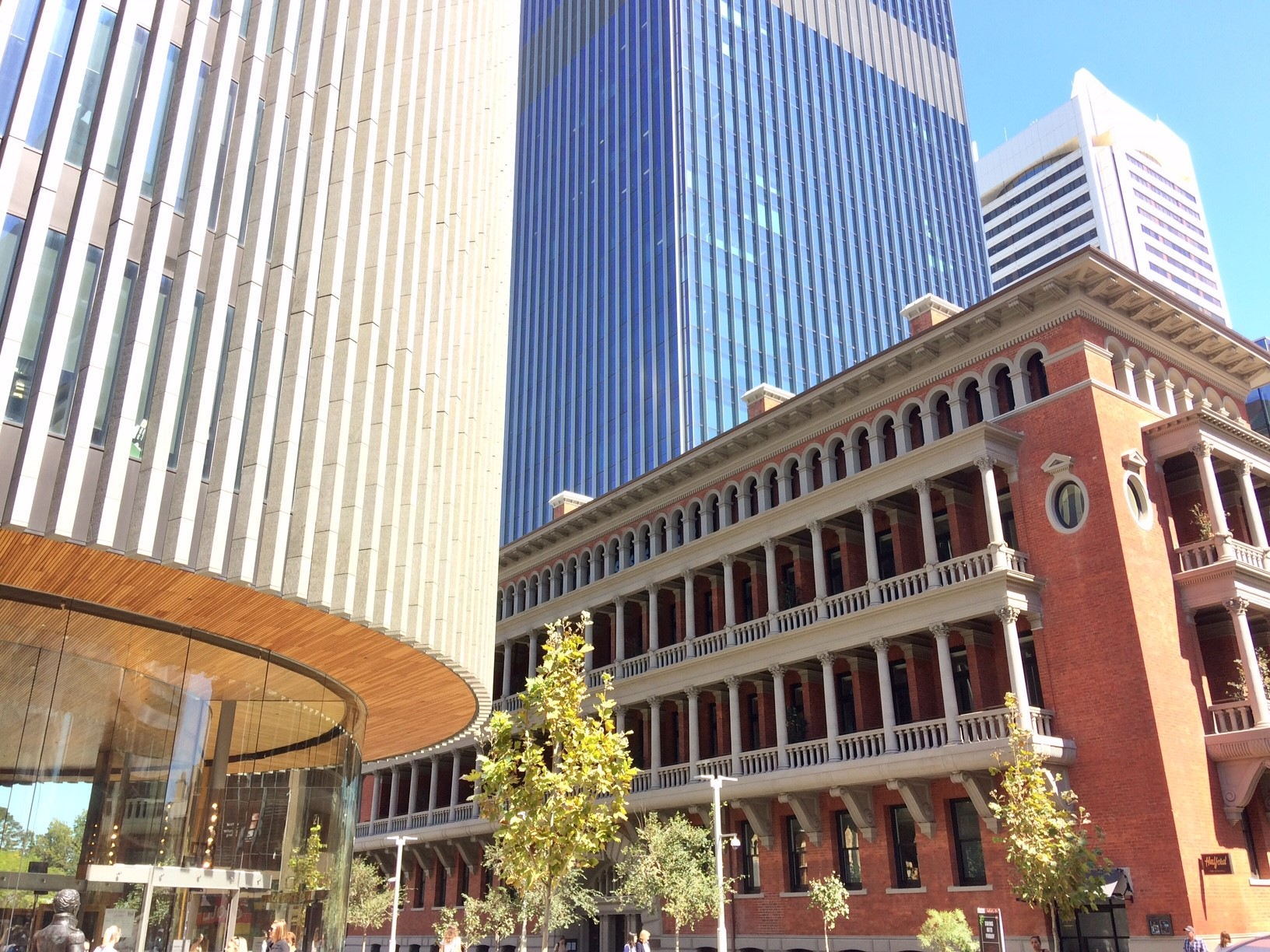
City of Perth Library and State Buildings

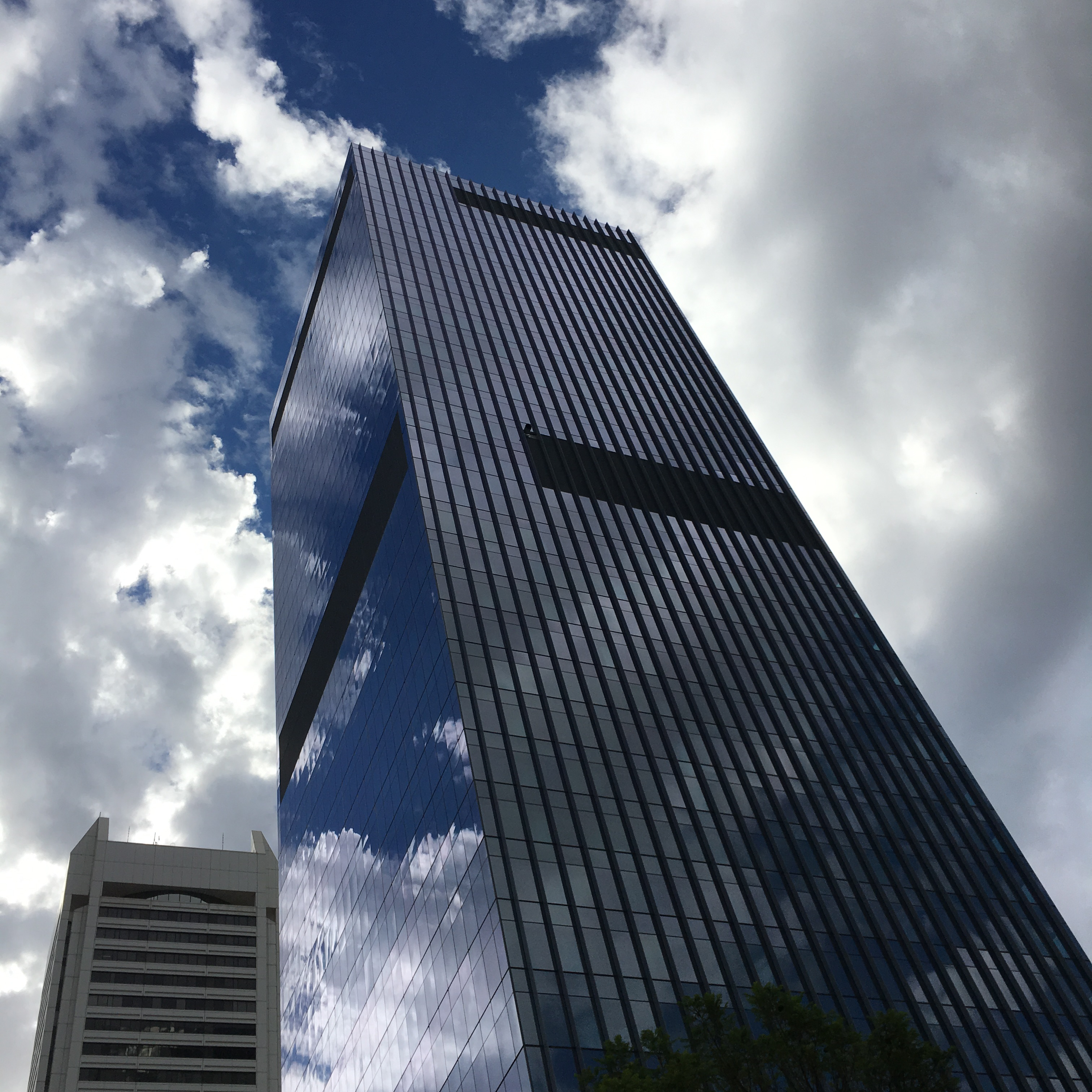
David Malcolm Justice Centre

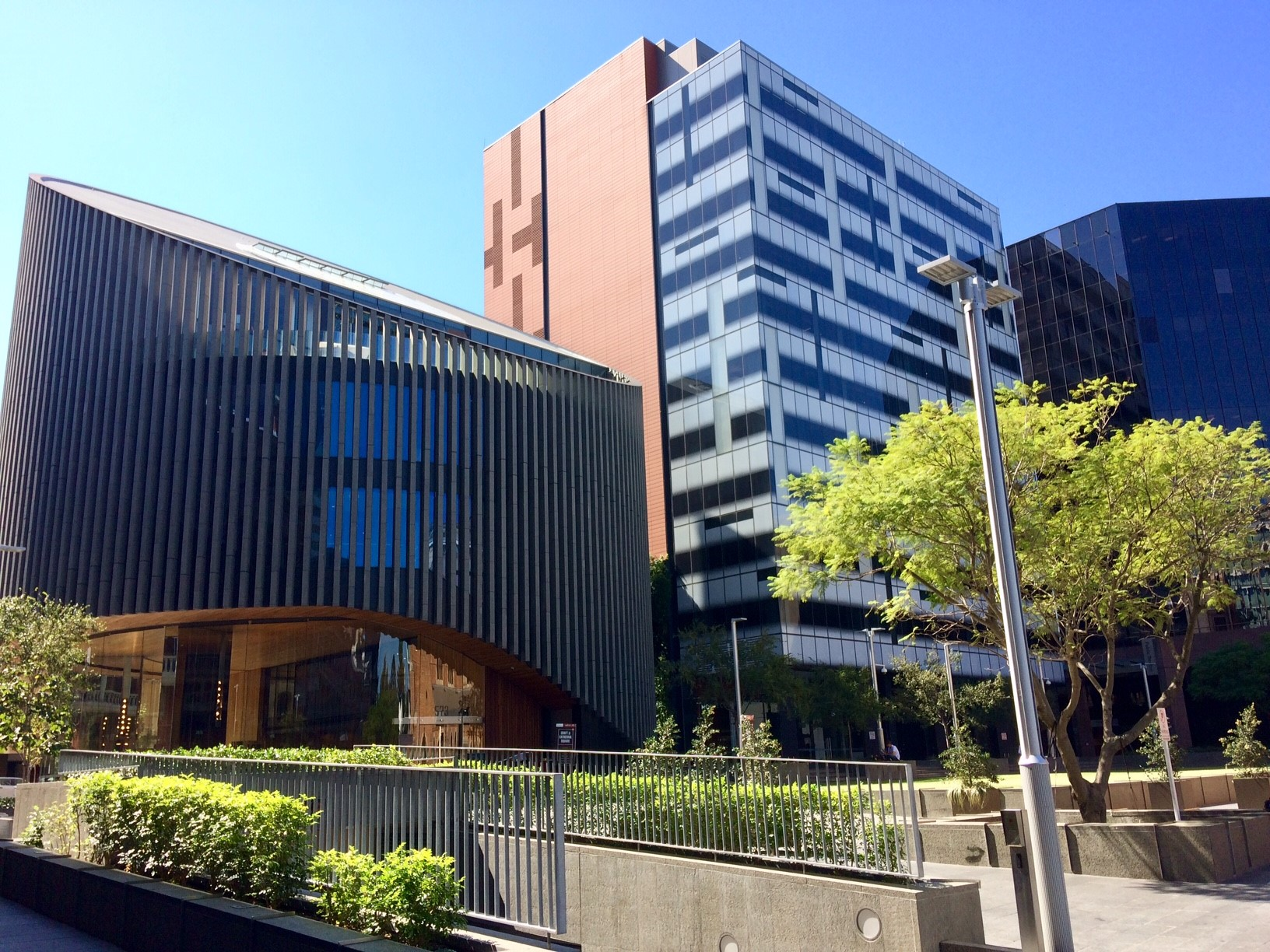
City of Perth Library and State Administrative Tribunal

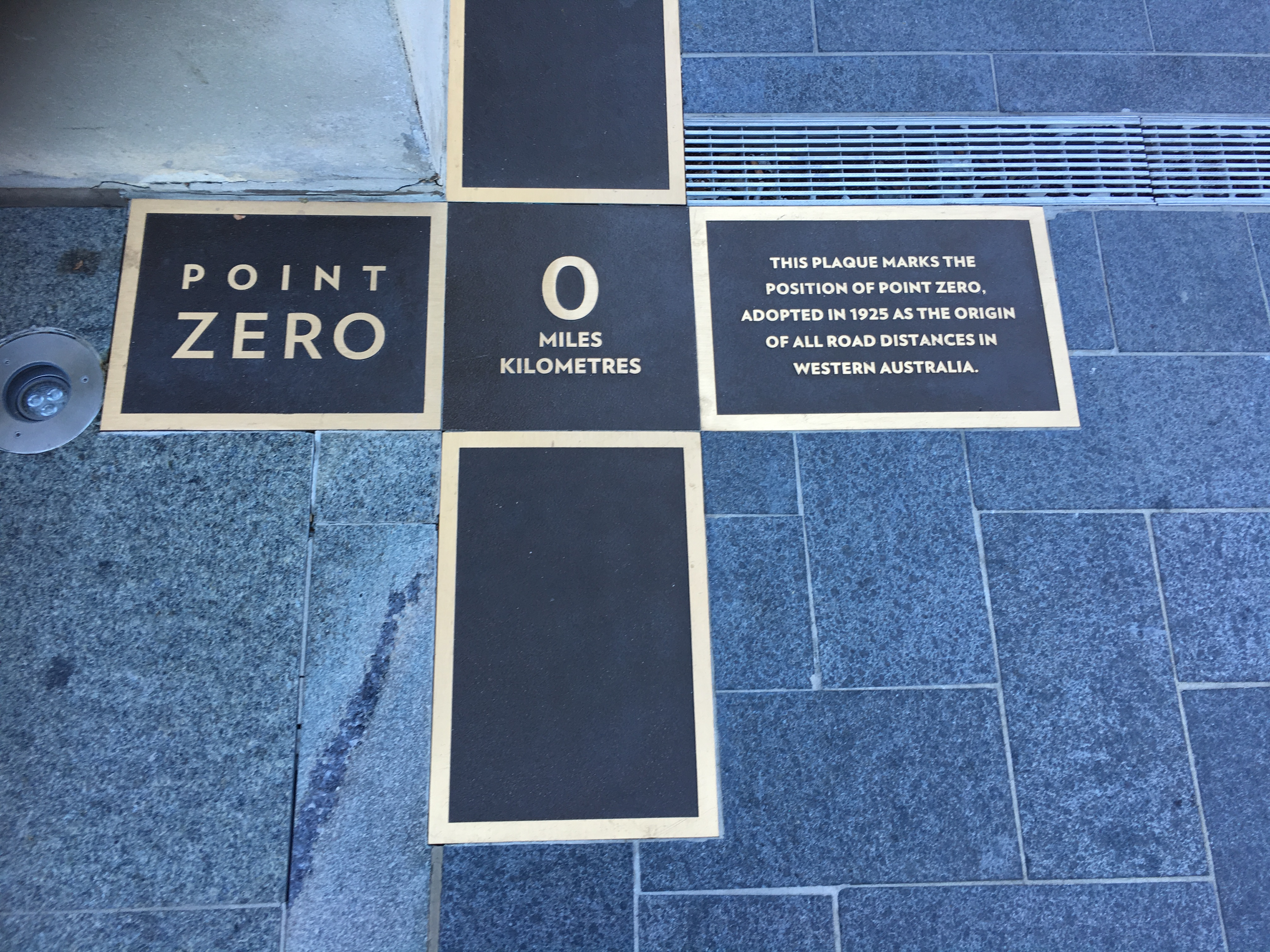
Point Zero

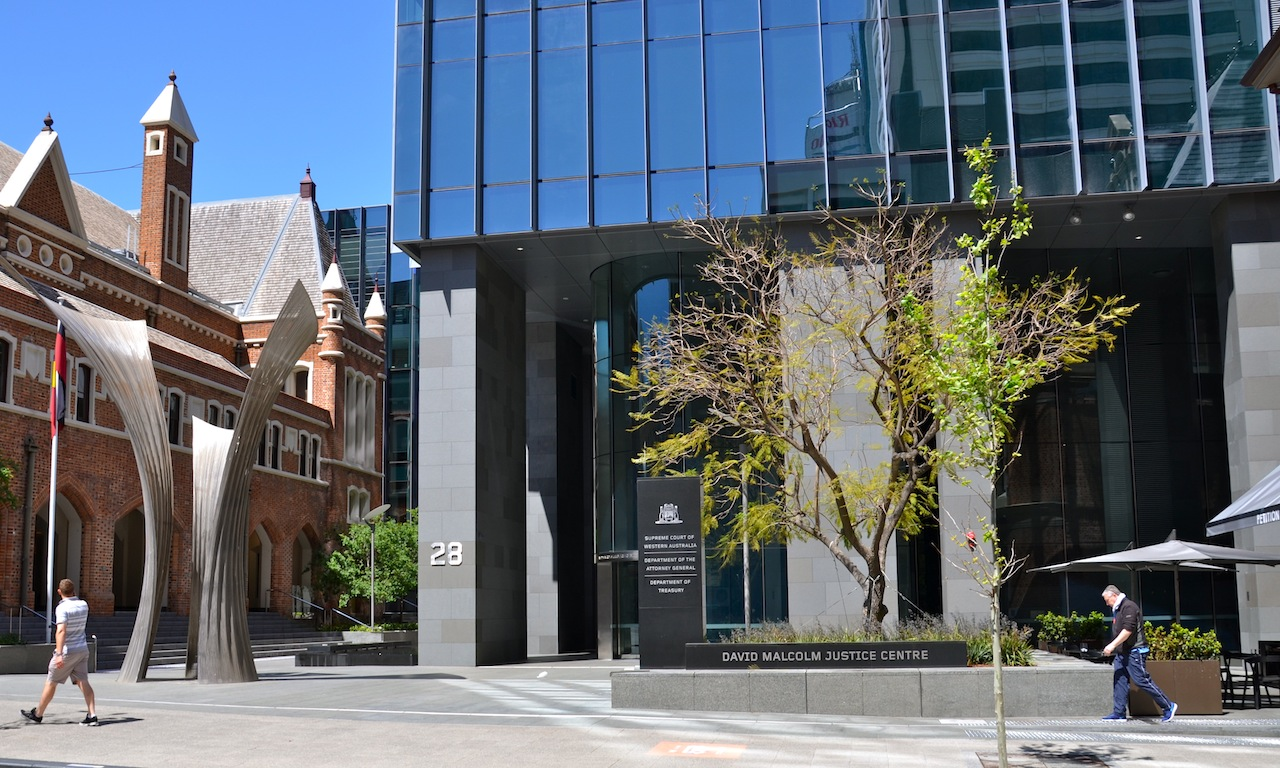
Entrance to the David Malcolm Justice Centre
