= Old Treasury Building =

Old Treasury Building is a name used for many buildings including;

- Treasury Building, Brisbane built 1886 - 1928 in stages
- Old Treasury Building, Melbourne built 1858-62
- Old Treasury Building, Perth
