= Swan River Mechanics' Institute =

Library and cultural institute in Perth, Western Australia

Coordinates: 31.9554°S 115.8620°E

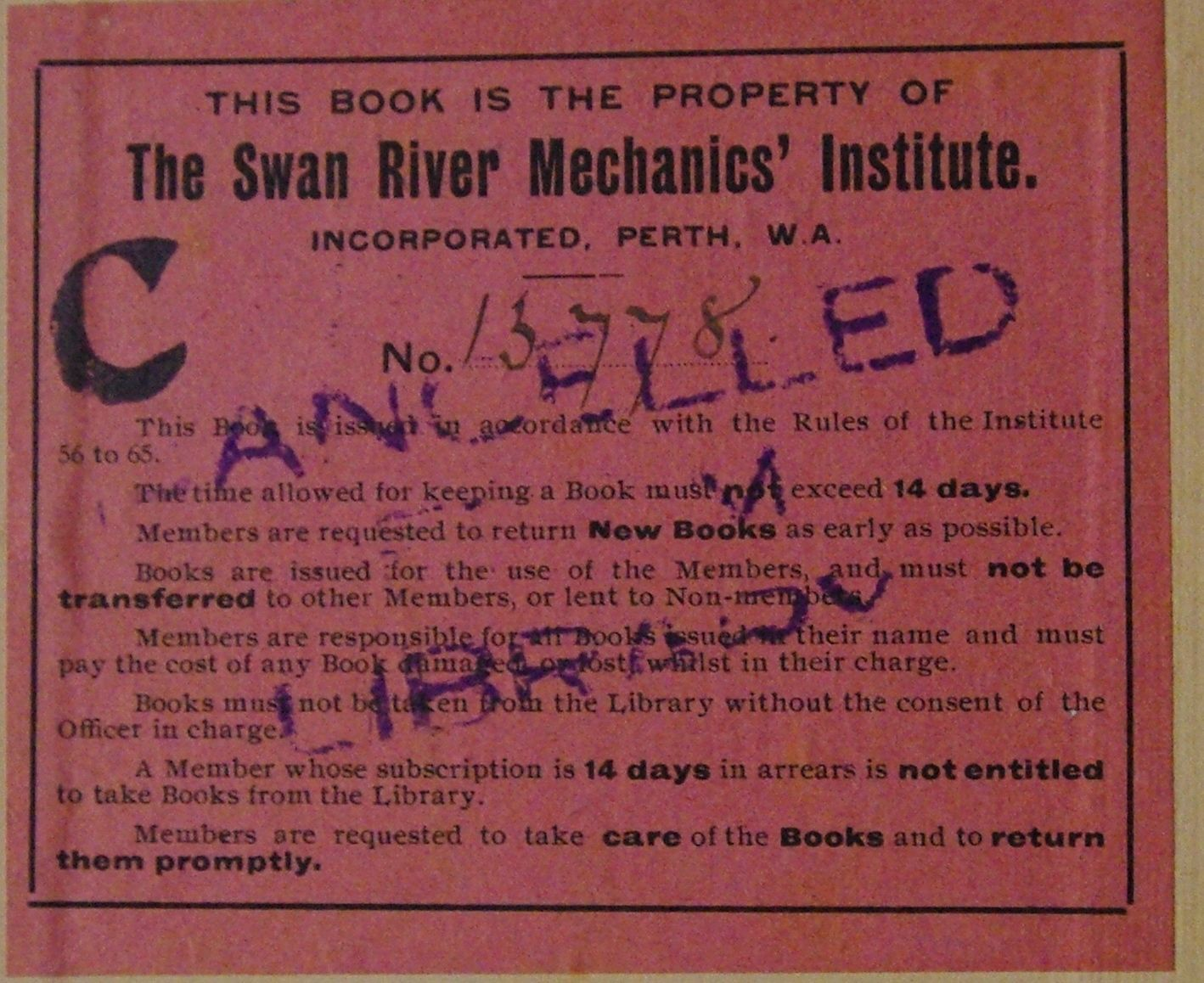
Pre-1914 bookplate

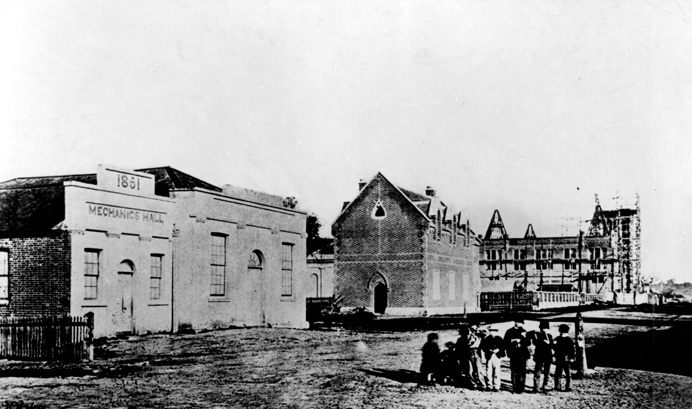
Looking west along Hay Street, on the left is the 1851 building. The Perth Town Hall (built 1867) is in the distant right and appears to be under construction. The building in the centre is the Freemason's Lodge (1866) which later became the first premises of the R&I Bank.

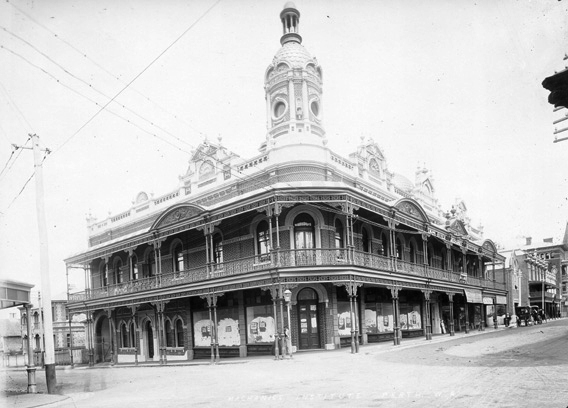
The new Institute building, c. 1900

The Swan River Mechanics' Institute was the Swan River Colony's first cultural centre, established on 21 January 1851. In time it was to house an extensive and well-used subscription library and a natural history collection, including botanical, zoological and mineral specimens. A new building replaced the old in 1899, and in 1909 the institute was renamed Perth Literary Institute.

In 1957 the institute became the City of Perth Library, which moved to another building in 1963. The original building, which was located on the south-west corner of Pier and Hay streets in Perth, was demolished in the 1970s.

== Foundation ==
The Swan River Mechanics' Institute was established on 21 January 1851. Its founding president was Surveyor-General John Septimus Roe, who held the position until his death in 1878. Other officers included Joseph Hamblin (chairman), Bernard Smith (treasurer) and Harry Hughes (secretary). Roe's botanical collection, which was kept at the institute, won him membership of the Linnean Society of London. The second president was Luke Leake, who held the position until his death in 1886.

Although ostensibly formed for the educational benefit of the working classes, the Mechanics' Institute, like many in the Australian colonies, was mostly dominated and sponsored by men of the middle class and tended to pursue mostly literary goals as well as providing a recreational facility for that group. Hay describes the activities: "the educated gentry 'improved' the workers through the medium of occasional lectures, discussion classes which emerged from literary meetings, the establishment of a reading room and a project to build a scientific museum". Institute rules prevented discussion of current political issues; in 1856 a carpenter by the name of Joseph Chester was expelled from the Institute for criticising government policies.

The Swan River Mechanics' Institute was the first such organisation formed in the colony, followed closely by the Fremantle Mechanics Institute on 8 August 1851. Other mechanics' institutes were formed in Albany in 1853, Busselton and York in 1861, Guildford (as a branch of the Swan River Mechanics' Institute) in 1862, Greenough in 1865, Northam and Toodyay in 1866, and Bunbury in 1867. Ex-convicts were not accepted as Mechanics' Institute members and hence a number of alternative working men's associations arose in the 1860s to cater for working classes. Membership was by subscription, and required no qualification other than that the applicant be a respectable member of the community.

== Premises ==
Early meetings took place at the Court House and at a temporary reading room at the Boys' School in Murray Street.

A site for a Mechanics Institute building in Howick Street (later Hay Street) was gifted by the government and surveyed in August 1851. The land was vested in trustees, and managed by a committee appointed by its members. The corner stone for the new building was laid by Governor Fitzgerald on 25 May 1852.

Moves to establish a permanent museum in the city during the 1880s saw the institute's specimen collections move to premises at the recently closed Perth Gaol in 1892. These collections laid the foundations of what became the Western Australian Museum.

In 1899 the original building was replaced by spacious two storey premises on the same site, which included a concert hall with seating for 400 people and a lodge room with accommodation for another 200. The building's architect was William G. Wolf, who also designed His Majesty's Theatre and Hotel in Hay Street. The foundation stone for the new building was laid by the Premier Sir John Forrest on 20 June 1898. The premier was a former Institute president. The West Australian described the building:

[The hall] is a magnificent apartment, 70 by 31 feet [21.3 m × 9.4 m], with platform, dressing rooms, and so forth. This and all the rooms on the same floor facing the street have French casements opening on to the balcony which surrounds the building. The edifice is in the Italian style of architecture, and the main entrance to the institute is from Hay Street. There are six shops in the building facing the same street, and a block of offices in Pier Street for letting purposes. The room in which the lending library is to be situated is 40 ft × 25 ft [12.2 m × 7.6 m], and faces Pier Street, and the reading room measures 40 ft × 24 ft [12.2 m × 7.3 m].

At the time of its opening in 1899, the library contained 6,000 volumes and membership was 389. The cost of the building was £10,721, equivalent to A$1.9 million in 2022.

== Perth Literary Institute ==
Its name was changed to Perth Literary Institute in December 1909, and at about the same time its inventory showed the library to contain 564 books related to history; biography, 359; essays, 382; travel and geography, 421; general science, 275; social science, philosophy, and theology, 238; poetry and the drama, 199; serial and miscellaneous, 333; statistical and works of reference, 398; and fiction, 6,274, and a grand total of 9,443 volumes.

In 1951 it celebrated its centenary.

== City of Perth Library ==
In 1957 the institute was taken over by the Perth City Council and became the City of Perth Library. Soon after, its subscription library was replaced by a free lending library.

The City of Perth Library was established in the Council House in 1963 and remained there until 1995.

The Perth Literary Institute building (Note: A 1969 photograph shows the building with the verandas removed and used as branch of the Bank of New South Wales.) was demolished sometime in the 1970s and the site now includes the Perth Law Chambers. (Note: The Perth Literary Institute "moved to new premises on the corner of Hay and Pier streets" in 1931.)

== See also ==
- Cultural institutions in Australia
