= Solicitor-General of Western Australia =

Second Law Officer of Western Australia

- Western Australian coat of arms
- Incumbent; Jean Shaw SC since January 2026
- Department of Justice
- Reports to: Attorney-General of Western Australia
- Website: www.justice.wa.gov.au

The Solicitor-General of Western Australia, known informally as the Solicitor-General, is the state's Second Law Officer, after the Attorney General who is the state's First Law Officer. The Solicitor-General serves as one of the legal and constitutional advisers of the government in Western Australia. The Solicitor-General usually appears on behalf of the State of Western Australia in the High Court of Australia, in litigation where the State or a Minister is a party or where the Attorney General of Western Australia intervenes in constitutional litigation. Such litigation typically concerns the constitutional validity of legislation, or the validity of executive action by the government.

The Solicitor-General is addressed in court as "Mr/Ms Solicitor". Despite the title, the position is usually occupied by a senior barrister, although any Australian lawyer of at least eight years experience is eligible for appointment. The current Solicitor-General is Jean Shaw SC.

The office of Solicitor-General is not a political office. The Solicitor-General is required to provide independent legal advice to the Government of Western Australia. The Solicitor-General does not provide advice to members of the public, unless permitted to do so by a right of private practice granted by the Governor under s. 6 of the Solicitor-General Act 1969 (WA).

== History and function ==
The Solicitor-General Act 1969 (WA) provides for the office and functions of Solicitor-General. The appointment is made by the Governor for the State of Western Australia upon the advice of the Executive Council. The Act provides for an appointment for a term not exceeding seven years, with the possibility of renewal. By s. 9 of the Solicitor-General Act 1969 (WA), the Solicitor-General may act as counsel for the State of Western Australia or for any other body for whom the Attorney General requests him to act, and may perform such other duties of counsel as the Attorney General directs. The Solicitor-General may also exercise statutory functions conferred by other legislation upon him or her. The Solicitor-General can also exercise statutory powers of the Attorney-General, which have been delegated in accordance with s.13 of the Solicitor-General Act 1969 (WA).

A list of people who have previously occupied the office of Solicitor-General of Western Australia:

No.	Solicitor-General	Term	Time in Office	Comment/Notes
1.	William Frederic Sayer KC	1905-1912		
	William Frederic Sayer KC	1912		Crown Solicitor
2.	William Frederic Sayer KC	1913-1930		
	No Solicitor-General from 1930-1935 due to the Great Depression			
3.	James Leonard Walker KC	1935-1945		
4.	Sydney Howard Good MBE QC	1946-1969		
5.	Ronald Darling Wilson CMG QC	1969-1979		
6.	Kevin Horace Parker AO QC	1979-1994		
7.	Robert John Meadows QC	1995-2011		
	Robert Mackenzie Mitchell SC	2011-2012		Acting Solicitor-General
8.	Grant Richard Donaldson SC	2012-2016		
8.	Peter Damien Quinlan SC	2016-2018		
9.	Joshua Thomson SC	2018-2023		
10.	Craig Bydder SC	2023-2026		
11.	Jean Shaw SC	2026- present		

Notably:

- Sydney Howard Good MBE QC was appointed as the first Chief Judge of the District Court of Western Australia;
- Ronald Darling Wilson CMG QC was appointed as the first Western Australian justice of the High Court of Australia;
- Kevin Horace Parker AO QC was a Judge of the Supreme Court of Western Australia and a Judge and Vice-President of the International Criminal Tribunal for the Former Yugoslavia;
- Robert Mackenzie Mitchell SC is a Judge of Appeal of the Supreme Court of Western Australia;
- Peter Damien Quinlan SC is the Chief Justice of the Supreme Court of Western Australia;
- Craig Bydder SC is a Judge of the Supreme Court of Western Australia.
