= Department of Treasury (Western Australia) =

Western Australian government department

Department overview
- Dissolved: 30 June 2025
- Superseding Department: Department of Treasury and Finance.
- Jurisdiction: Government of Western Australia
- Headquarters: David Malcolm Justice Centre; 28 Barrack Street, Perth
- Minister responsible: Rita Saffioti, Treasurer
- Department executive: Michael Barnes, Under Treasurer
- Website: www.wa.gov.au/organisation/department-of-treasury

The Department of Treasury is a department of the Government of Western Australia. The department is responsible for principal economic and financial advice to the state government.

The department was one of the few that remained mostly unaffected by the 2017 restructuring of the Western Australian government departments, which resulted in the number of departments being reduced from 41 to 25.

On 1 July 2025 it will become the Department of Treasury and Finance and take over some functions from the Department of Finance.
