= Department of Justice (Western Australia) =

Government department of Western Australia

Department of Justice Western Australia
Agency overview
- Formed: July 2017
- Dissolved: Department of the Attorney General; Department of Corrective Services
- Jurisdiction: Government of Western Australia
- Headquarters: David Malcolm Justice Centre, 28 Barrack Street, Perth
- Agency executive: Kylie Maj, Director General
- Website: www.justice.wa.gov.au

The Department of Justice is the Government of Western Australia department responsible for the provision of justice, legal, corrective, registry, guardianship and trustee services to meet the needs of the community.

== History ==
The original Department of Attorney General existed between 1891 and 1909.

The subsequent department between 1909 and 1993 was named the Crown Law Department and was the longest lasting entity under the one name.

In 1993 the Ministry of Justice was formed by the amalgamation of the former Corrective Services and Crown Law Departments and the Youth Justice Bureau, as well as some of the functions of the Ministry of Consumer Affairs. During which time, the Ministry of Justice formed an SDA with the Department of Infrastructure, Regional Development & Cities in order to provide the administration of justice to the external territories of Christmas Island and Cocos (Keeling) Islands.

Then it was changed to the Department of Justice between 2001 and 2006.

On 1 February 2006, the Department of Justice was abolished, and functions of the department passed to two newly formed departments: the Department of the Attorney General and the Department of Corrective Services.

On 1 July 2017, the Department of the Attorney General and the Department of Corrective Services were amalgamated to form the Department of Justice, as part of the Machinery of Government changes introduced earlier that year.

=== Preceding and related agencies ===
Start date	Crown Law	Corrections
1 January 1881	Judicial Department	
1 January 1890	Unknown	Gaols Department
1 January 1891	Department of Attorney General	Gaols Department
1 January 1909	Crown Law Department	Gaols Department
1 January 1947	Crown Law Department	Prisons Department
1 January 1971	Crown Law Department	Department of Corrections
1 August 1982	Crown Law Department	Prisons Department
3 April 1987	Crown Law Department	Department of Corrective Services
1 January 1993	Ministry of Justice	
1 July 2001	Department of Justice	
1 February 2006	Department of the Attorney General	Department of Corrective Services
1 July 2017	Department of Justice	

== Sub-departments ==
The current department in its structure has multiple sub departments:

- Policy & Aboriginal Services – "Develops policy and legislation for the Government and information for Departmental business areas. Aboriginal mediation. Aboriginal justice."
- Court and Tribunal Services – "Courts, tribunals and boards, victim support, court security, fines enforcement, justices of the peace."
- Parliamentary Counsel's Office – "Legislative drafting services to Government."
- Office of the Public Advocate – "Advocacy, guardianship and community education services on behalf of people with decision-making disabilities."
- Public Trustee – "Trustee services to WA community."
- Registry of Births, Deaths, & Marriages – "Creates and stores birth, death and marriage records; conducts civil marriages."
- State Solicitor's Office – "Legal Services to Government."
- Corporate Services – "Asset and contract management, business services, financial management, human resources, information services."

== Solicitor General ==
The principal legal adviser to the Attorney General is the Solicitor-General, who is described as the second law officer of the State. The Office of the Solicitor-General was created with the Solicitor General Act (1969).

While the Attorney General is an elected Member of Parliament, the Solicitor-General is an independent position, and a civil servant. The Attorney General may delegate functions to the Solicitor-General.

On 10 October 2018, Joshua Thomson SC was appointed Solicitor General for a term of five years. He replaced Peter Quinlan SC, who was appointed Chief Justice of Western Australia.

== See also ==
- List of prisons in Western Australia
- List of Western Australian courts and tribunals
- Solicitor-General of Western Australia
- State Administrative Tribunal
