= Treasury Buildings, Perth =

Heritage-listed building in Perth, Western Australia

Treasury Buildings
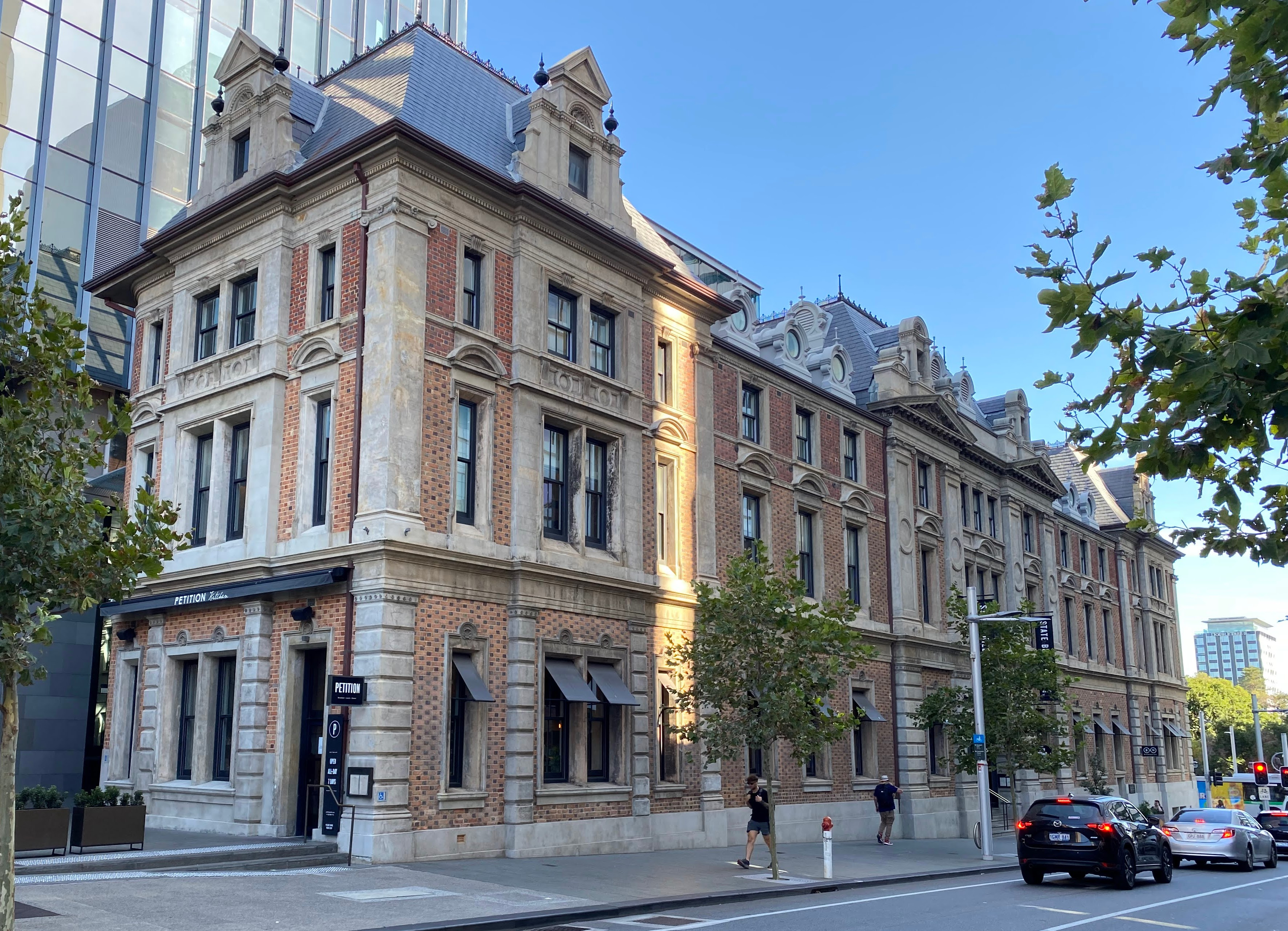
- Treasury Buildings in 2023

General information
- Type: Heritage listed building
- Location: Perth, Western Australia
- Coordinates: 31.9556°S 115.8603°E

Western Australia Heritage Register
- Type: State Registered Place
- Part of: Central Government Offices (1973)
- Reference no.: 4275

The Treasury Buildings, or Old Treasury Buildings, are part of the Cathedral Square complex situated between Barrack Street and St Georges Terrace in Perth, Western Australia.

In the 1890s the buildings were known as the Government Buildings or Government Offices prior to the Treasury being situated in the building.

The location was considered as significant in that the site of the founding of the city of Perth in 1829 was on the north west corner of the complex.

The buildings contained a range of government departments and office until the late 20th century.

The Premier of Western Australia had offices in the building in the 1920s, and in 1929 protests focused on gathering in front of the buildings were conducted by unemployed.

In the early 21st century, the building was re-developed. It became part of the revitalised Cathedral Square complex, with the name State Buildings.
