= Barrack Street Bridge =

Bridge in Perth, Western Australia

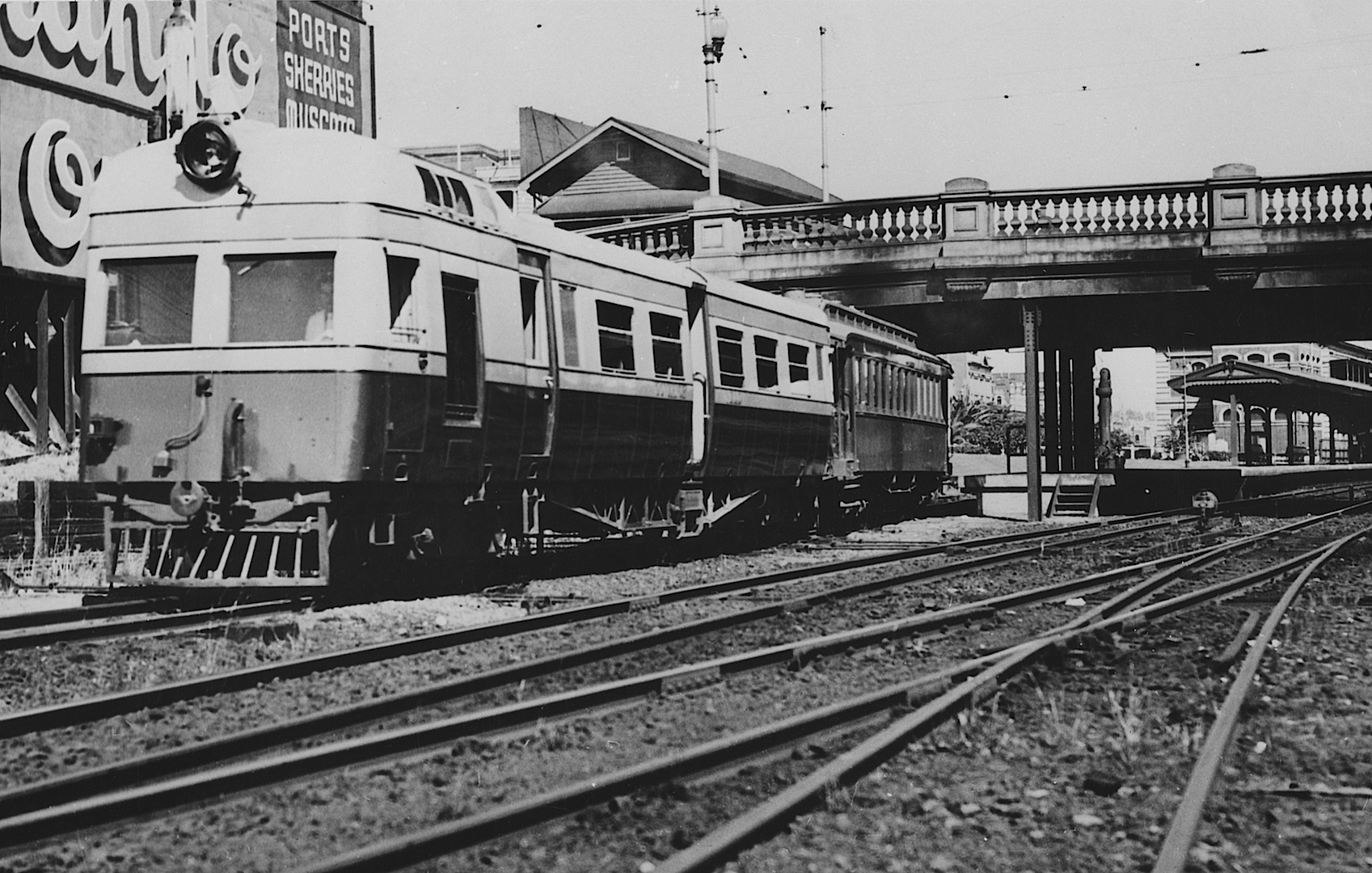
- Barrack Street Bridge viewed from the east with Perth railway station visible just behind the bridge, c. 1930s
- Coordinates: 31°57′07″S 115°51′42″E
- Carries: Beaufort Street
- Crosses: Eastern Railway

Characteristics
- Material: Donnybrook stone; Meckering granite

History
- Construction start: 1907
- Construction end: 1908

Location
- Moving across the railway Barrack Street Bridge (1) is situated east of Perth Station (2) and Horseshoe Bridge (3). Pedestrians may also pass between the Perth CBD and Northbridge across Yagan Square (4), and between the CBD and Perth Cultural Centre via Padbury Walk (5), Upper Level Walkway (6) and Gallery Walk (7). King Street (8) is further west. Interactive map of Barrack Street Bridge

Barrack Street Bridge is the second crossing of the Eastern Railway line at its location just north of the Barrack Street intersection with Wellington Street at the eastern end of the Perth railway station yard in Perth, Western Australia. (Note: Not to be confused with the 1902 proposal for a bridge from Barrack Street to South Perth.) Despite its name the bridge carries Beaufort Street, although it has been called Beaufort Street Bridge.

The development of the Eastern Railway through Perth created a large yard and railway station area that separated the Perth central business district (CBD) from its adjacent northern streets. The first railway bridge at Barrack Street was timber, and in repair on a regular basis. It was demolished in 1894.

The Perth Railway Crossing Improvement Act 1892, an act by the Parliament of Western Australia granted assent on 13 January 1893, authorised the construction of the bridge and closure of the level crossings on Stirling Street.

== Current bridge ==
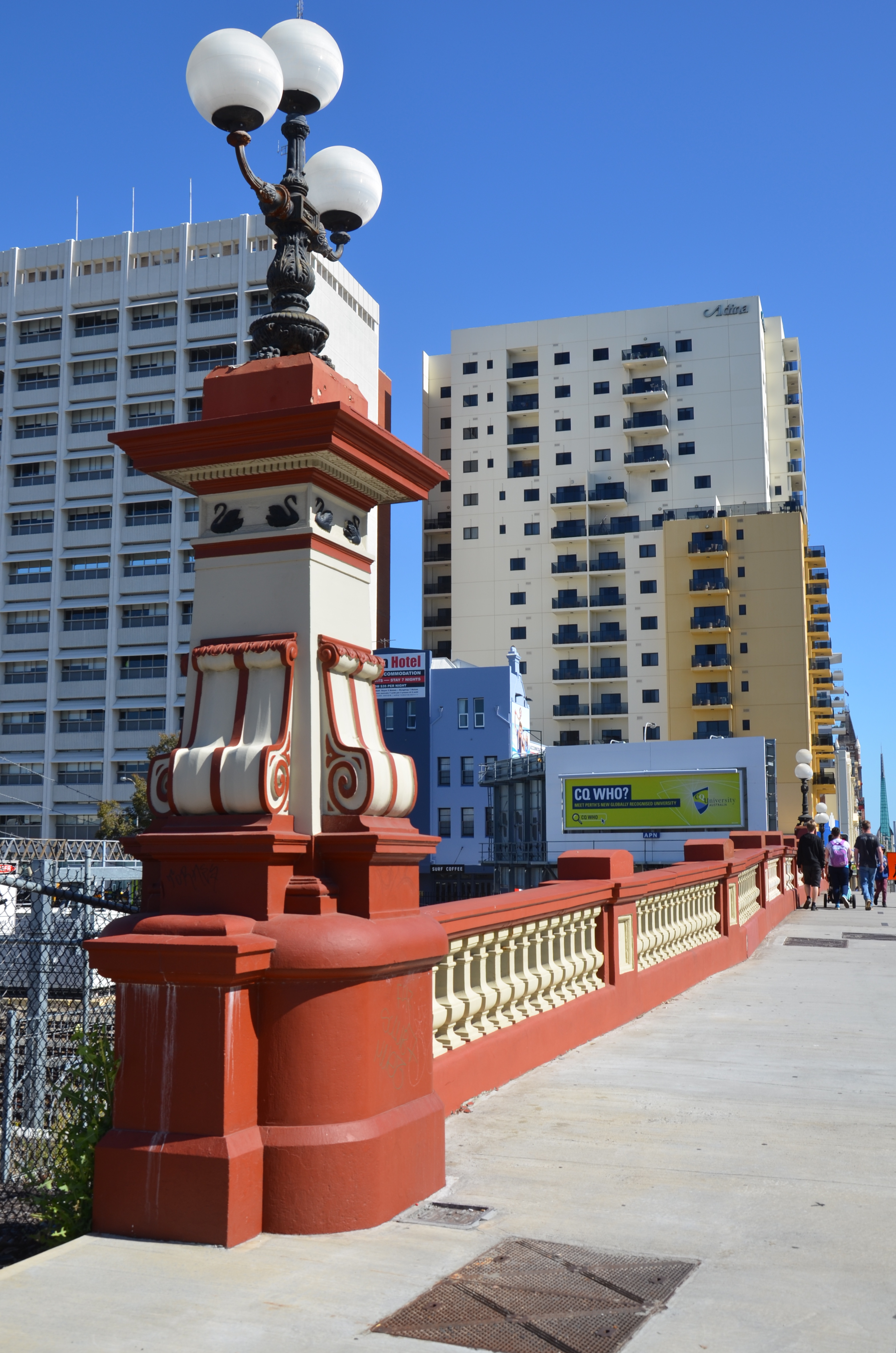
Looking south from the north east side of bridge

The Perth Railway Crossing Amendment Act 1906, assented to on 14 December 1906, authorised the demolishing of the old bridge and the building of a new one.

The current bridge, built in 1907–1908, was a dominant feature countered by the Horseshoe Bridge at the western end of the railway station. Parts of the construction included Donnybrook stone and Meckering granite.

It was also a location for paintings and photographs of the Perth railway station over time.

It lost its dominance in the landscape with the construction of the multi story car park adjacent to the west, in the late 20th century. Significant parts of the original railings were truncated by changes of the adjacent streets, but the lamps and fittings have been retained on the shortened sections.

In 1992, an eleven-month rebuild was completed.
