= Barrack Street =

Street in CBD of Perth, Western Australia

Barrack Street, Perth Western Australia
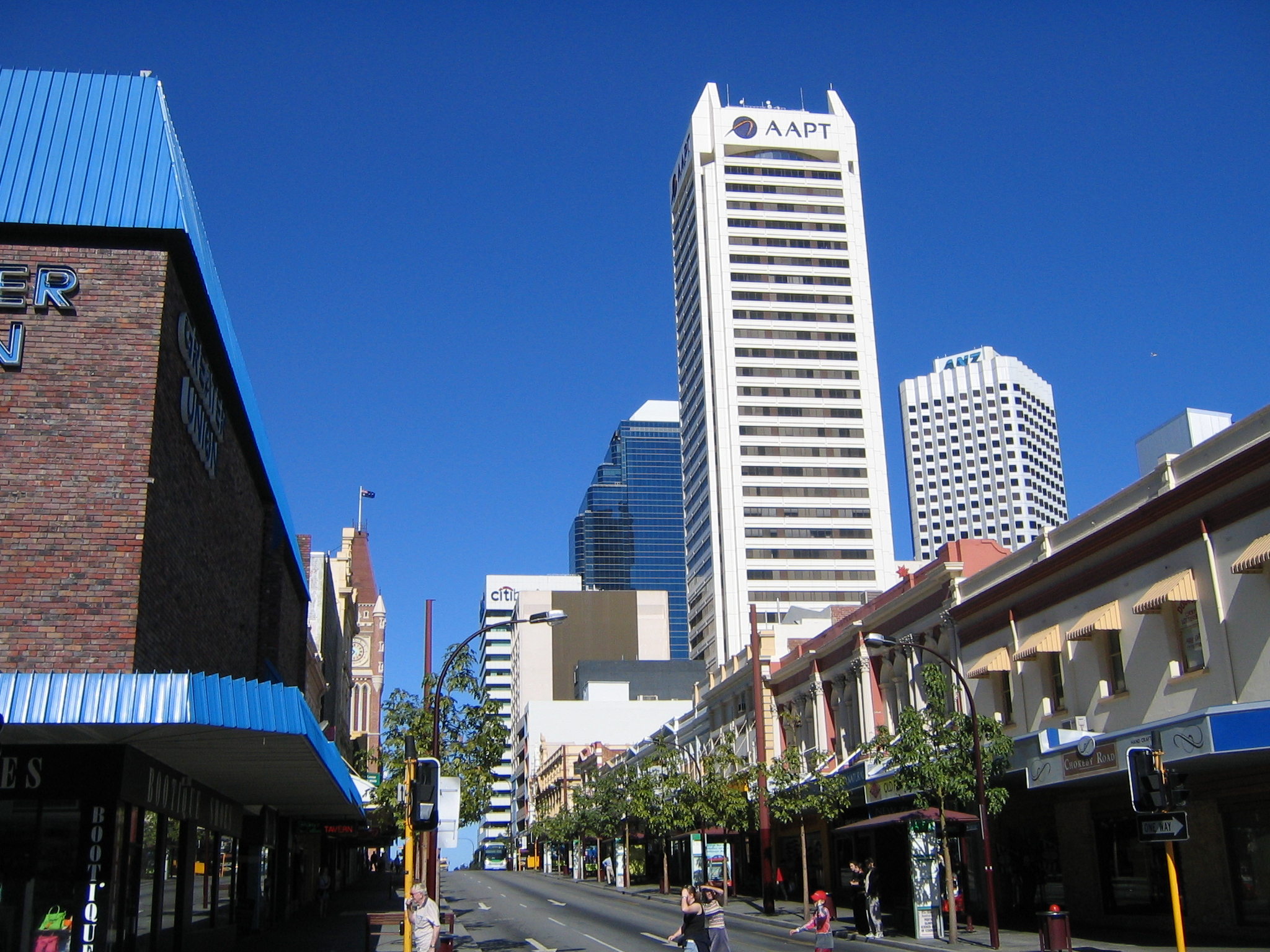
- View south down Barrack Street, from the corner of Murray Street, c. 2004

General information
- Type: Street
- Length: 750 m (0.5 mi)
- Opened: c. 1830s
- Route number(s): State Route 53

Major junctions
- South end: Riverside Drive (State Route 5)
- The Esplanade (State Route 5); St Georges Terrace; Hay Street; Murray Street
- North end: Wellington Street (State Route 65); Beaufort Street (State Route 53)

Location(s)
- LGA(s): City of Perth
- Suburb(s): Perth

Barrack Street is one of two major cross-streets in the Perth central business district, Western Australia. Together with St Georges Terrace, Wellington Street and William Street it defines the boundary of the main shopping precinct of the central city.

== Route description ==
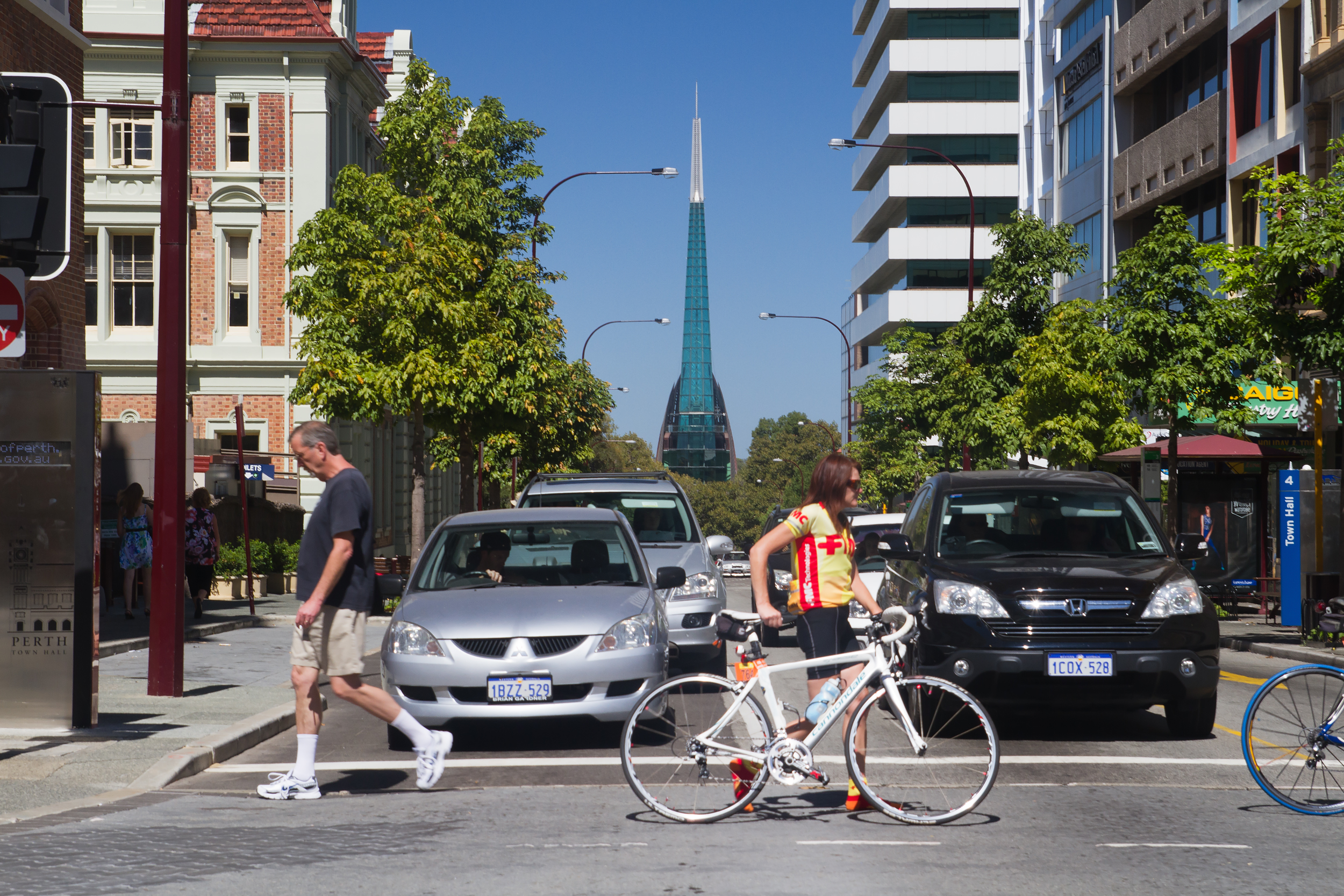
Looking south down Barrack Street towards the Swan Bells

Barrack Street commences at Barrack Street Jetty, and the adjacent Barrack Square. Moving in an uphill direction away from the Swan River, it passes alongside the Supreme Court Gardens and the Stirling Gardens. Crossing St Georges Terrace, Barrack Street then passes alongside the heritage-listed Treasury Buildings and the Perth Town Hall. The town hall location was regularly utilised for special occasions, including the royal visit in 1901, and the centenary of Western Australia celebrations in 1929.

Commercial buildings on the opposite side of the street give way to small retail businesses on both sides between Hay Street and Wellington Street.

The street terminates at Wellington Street, continuing as Beaufort Street on and over the Barrack Street Bridge, which crosses the Fremantle railway line. The Barrack Street Bridge was constructed in 1894.

== History ==
Barrack Street existed as a named road as early as 1833. It was named for the military barracks that existed along the alignment, at the corner of St Georges Terrace, in 1829. Construction of the barracks began on 13 August 1829, the day after Governor Stirling declared the foundation of the town of Perth. Soon afterwards, the soldiers' quarters were established, along an alignment that formed the street.

The section between Murray Street and Wellington Street saw a minor urban renewal with Barrack Plaza officially opening on 12 July 2006.

=== Traffic direction ===
Barrack Street began as a two-way street. On 4 March 1973 it became a one way street in a northerly direction in a pairing arrangement with William Street between The Esplanade and Brisbane Street when the Wellington Street bus station opened.

In 2010, the section between Riverside Drive and The Esplanade returned to two-way traffic. Further conversion occurred in 2011; the section between The Esplanade and St Georges Terrace was changed back to two-way traffic, and on 29 November 2015 the section between St Georges Terrace and Wellington Street was converted.

=== Cathedral Square ===
With the evolution of the properties in the CBD block defined by Barrack Street, Hay Street, Pier Street and St Georges Terrace, Barrack Street has become the western boundary of the Cathedral Square precinct. The renovation and revitalisation of the Perth Town Hall, and Treasury buildings has made the Barrack Street side a pedestrian entry point into the Square.

== Major intersections ==
Barrack Street intersects all the major east–west routes in the Perth CBD, with all intersections being signalised except for Geoffrey Bolton Avenue. Prior to two-way conversion in 2015, it was the northbound route of State Route 53 through the CBD with William Street, one block over to the west, carrying the route southbound. Since conversion and development of Elizabeth Quay, however, Barrack Street now carries both directions of State Route 53 north of The Esplanade before switching to State Route 5 south of The Esplanade.

Location	km	mi	Destinations	Notes
Perth	0.0	0.0	Wellington Street (State Route 65) - East Perth. West Perth	No right turn permitted from Wellington Street east to Barrack Street south. Northern terminus, continues north as Beaufort Street (State Route 53)
Perth	0.15	0.093	Murray Street east / Murray Street Mall west	
Perth	0.30	0.19	Hay Street east / Hay Street Mall west	
Perth	0.45	0.28	St Georges Terrace – Kings Park, West Perth, Victoria Park, Albany	No right turn permitted from St Georges Terrace east to Barrack Street south and Barrack Street south to St Georges Terrace west
Perth	0.6	0.37	The Esplanade (State Route 5) - Kings Park, Fremantle	Route transition. State Route 53 southern terminus, continues as State Route 5 southbound
Perth	0.7	0.43	Geoffrey Bolton Avenue – Elizabeth Quay	No right permitted from Barrack Street south to Geoffrey Bolton Avenue west
Perth	0.8	0.50	Riverside Drive (State Route 5) east - Victoria Park, East Perth / Barrack Square exits.	No turns permitted from Riverside Drive/Barrack Street to Barrack Square. Northern terminus, continues east as Riverside Drive (State Route 5)
1.000 mi = 1.609 km; 1.000 km = 0.621 mi: Incomplete access; Route transition
