= List of tallest buildings in Perth =

Skyline of Perth
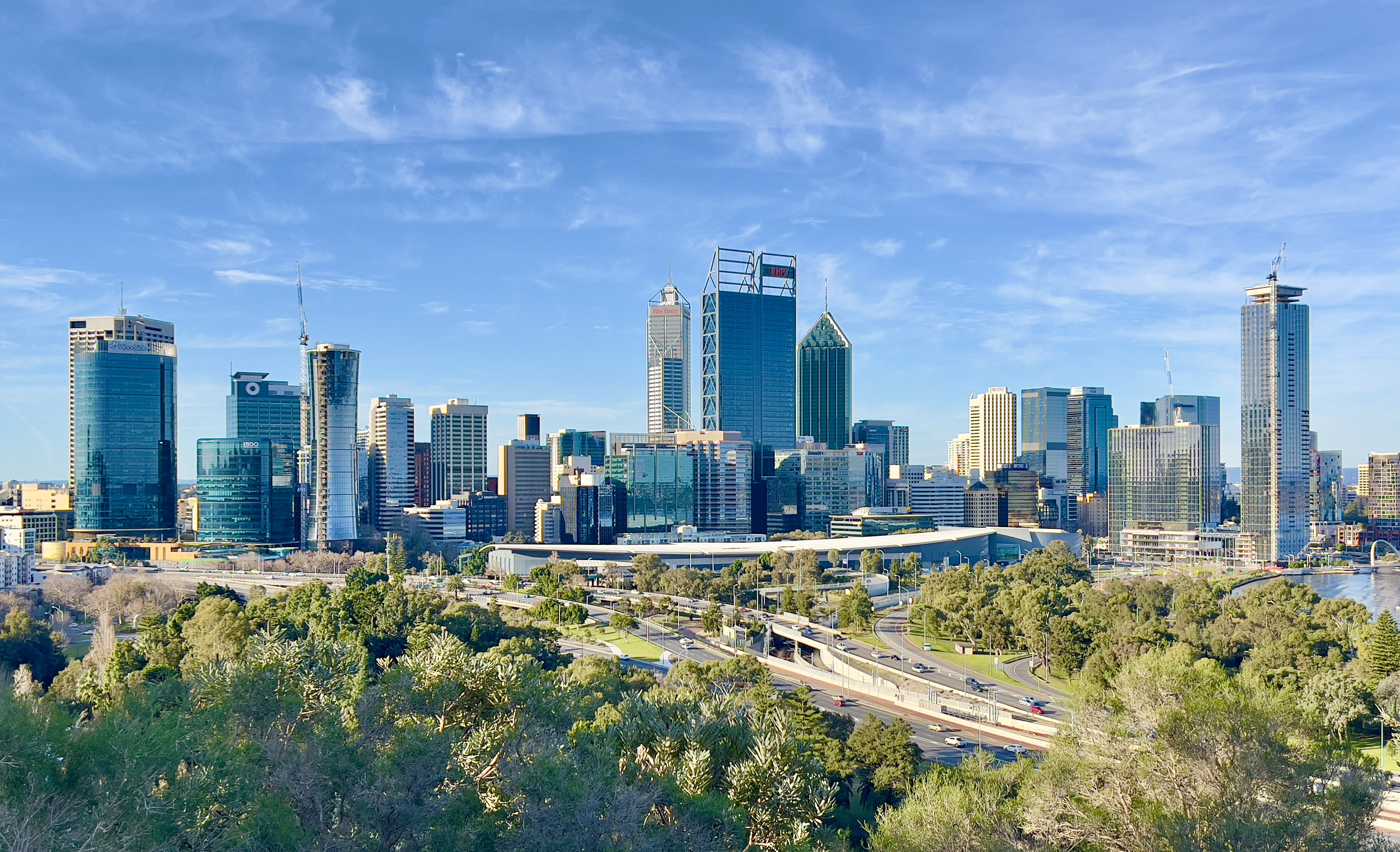
- Skyline of Perth in 2023
- Tallest building: Central Park (1992)
- Tallest building height: 261.7 m (859 ft)
- First 150 m+ building: 108 St Georges Terrace (1988)

Number of tall buildings (2026)
- Taller than 100 m (328 ft): 30
- Taller than 150 m (492 ft): 4
- Taller than 200 m (656 ft): 3

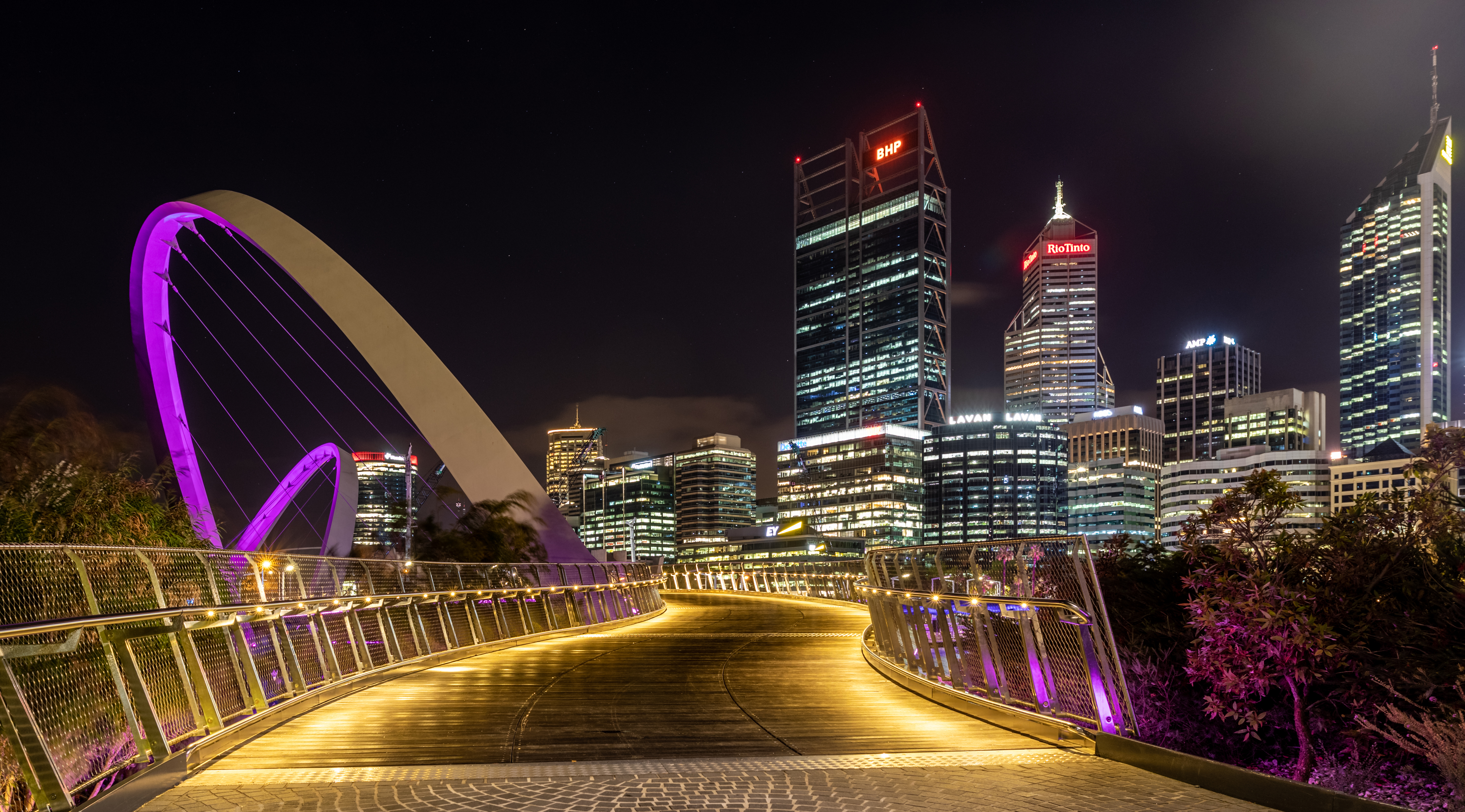
Elizabeth Quay Bridge (left) and skyscrapers in Perth (right)

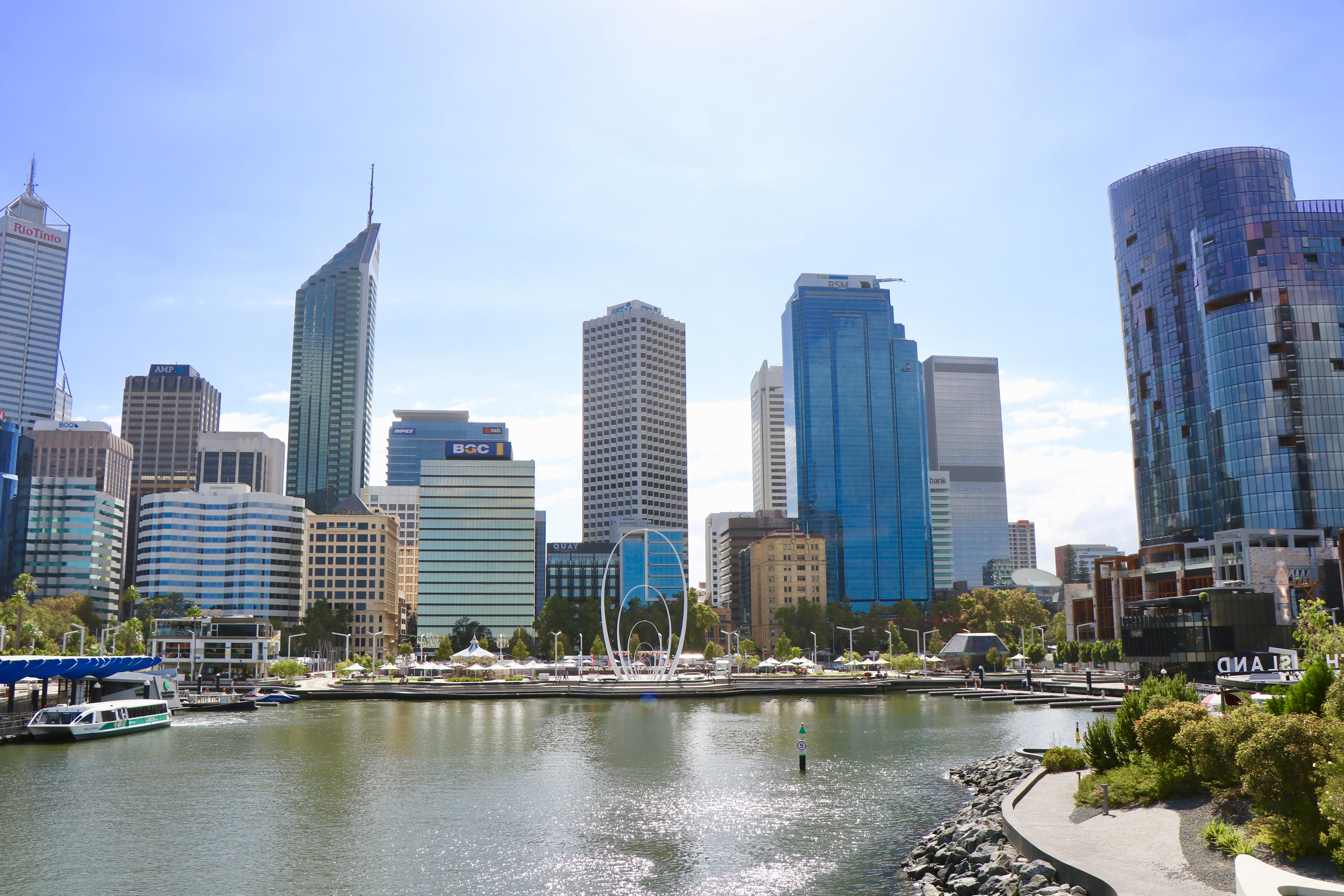
Elizabeth Quay surrounded by skyscrapers

Perth is the fourth-largest city in Australia, with an urban population of over 2.3 million. As the capital of Western Australia and by far its largest city, Perth contains the vast majority of the high-rises in the state. The city is home to 30 high-rise buildings that reach a height of 100 m (328 ft) or greater as of 2026, five of which are taller than 150 m (492 ft). Perth has the fifth-greatest number of skyscrapers of any Australian city, after Melbourne, Sydney, Brisbane, and the Gold Coast. The tallest building in Perth is the 51-storey Central Park (more commonly known as the Rio Tinto building) at 261.7 m (859 ft), completed in 1992; it also stands as the tallest building in Western Australia.

The first high-rises in Perth appeared towards the 1960s, one of them being Council House in 1963. High-rise development increased markedly in the 1970s with commercial skyscrapers such as St Martins Tower, the tallest building in the city from 1978 to 1988. This continued until the late 1980s and early 1990s, when Central Park and the city's third-tallest building, 108 St Georges Terrace, was built. Following a period of slower development from the mid-1990s to the mid-2000s, another high-rise boom occurred with a greater share of residential and hotel buildings, alongside new commercial towers. The most notable of these is Brookfield Place, the city's second tallest building. Built in 2012 at a height of 244 m (800ft), it serves as the headquarters of mining company BHP.

There are several ongoing projects that will further add to Perth's skyline. Elizabeth Quay is a major mixed-use development project that first broke ground in 2012. Currently topped out in Elizabeth Quay is EQ West, which, at a height of 186 m (610 ft), will be the fourth-tallest building in the city. Lot 4 EQ, in the same development, will surpass it at a height of 212 m (696 ft) when it is scheduled to be completed in 2029.

The large majority of tall buildings in Perth are situated in the city's central business district, with recent high-rise developments extending the skyline eastwards, towards East Perth. The main skyline runs northwest to southeast and is bounded by the Swan River to the south. Another high-rise cluster is being developed across the river in South Perth, where the residential tower Civic Heart was completed in 2024. There are additional new clusters on the western side of Canning Bridge and in Burswood.

== History ==
Number of buildings by height in Perth by the end of each year. Click on the legend to toggle a specific height on or off. View chart definition.

=== 1930s–60s ===
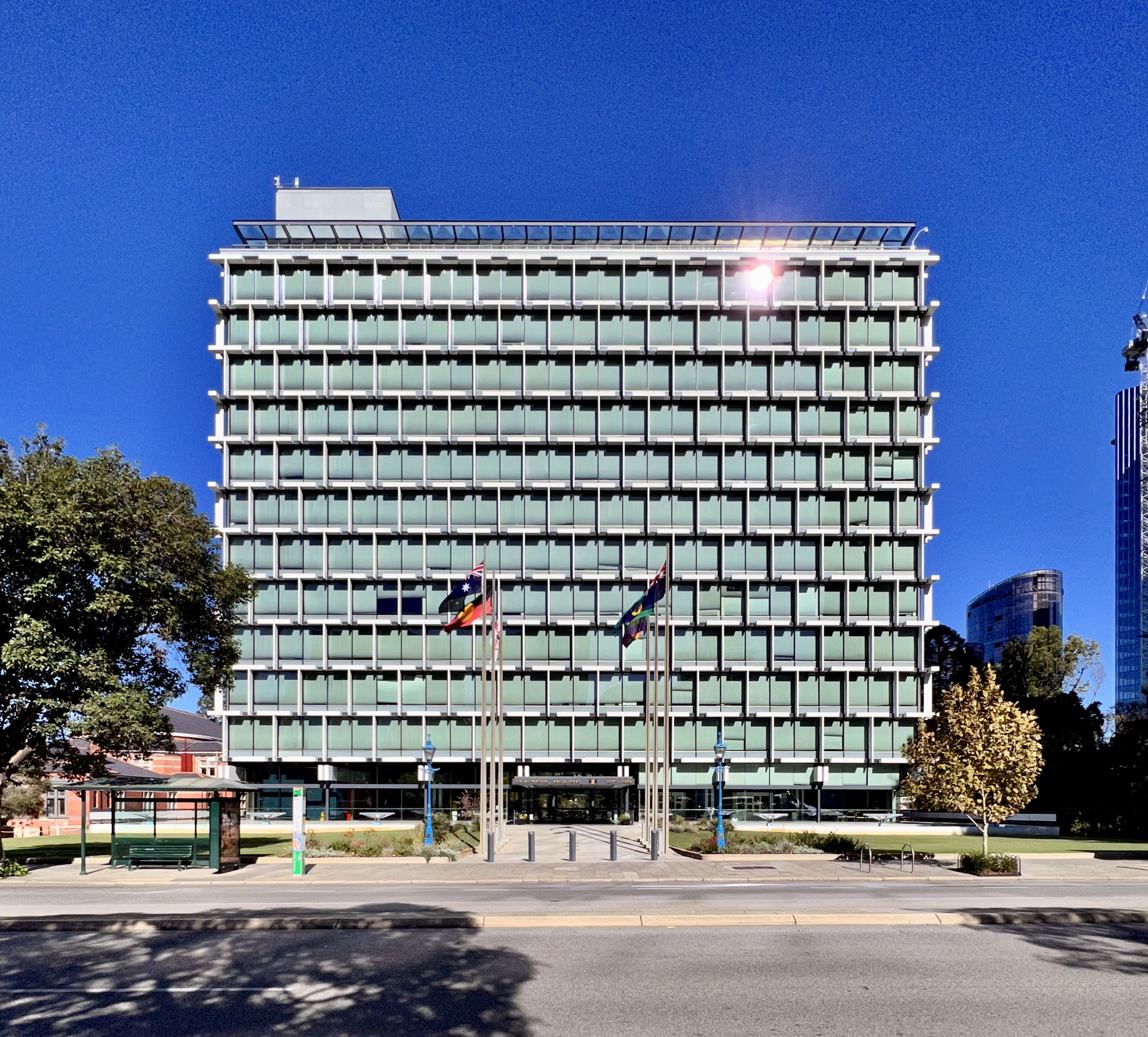
Perth's Council House, after renovations in the 1990s

Tall buildings in Perth got their start later than in larger Australian cities like Sydney or Melbourne. One of the earliest high-rises in the city was the CML Building, built for the Colonial Mutual Life Assurance Society in 1936; the company had also built some of the earliest high-rises in Brisbane and Adelaide. Construction took place during the Great Depression, providing work for 200 men, and was overseen by local architect Reginald Summerhayes, who was responsible for decorative gargoyles on the exterior of the building. It was the tallest building in the city for over two decades until 1962, and was ultimately demolished in 1980.

During the 1950s and 1960s, many of Perth's older buildings had been demolished to make way for modern developments, which had led to criticism of the Perth City Council for approving such redevelopments. The CML Building was surpassed by the second T&G Building, now known as Citibank House, a 68 m (224 ft), 18-storey office building completed in 1962. The modernist high-rise took the place of Moir Chambers, an American Romasque building that had been standing since 1897. Despite protests, it was demolished in 1960, and construction on the new CML Building began the same year. When the T&G Building was constructed, there were no plot ratio limits imposed by the City of Perth on multistorey developments, and the building had a plot ratio of approximately 7:1. However, subsequent to the construction, a limit of 5:1 was imposed. Another early high-rise is the 13-storey Council House, opened by Queen Elizabeth a year after Perth had hosted the Commonwealth Games. The building served as the headquarters of the city council, which in 1959 launched an architectural competition for the new building.

=== 1970s–1990s ===
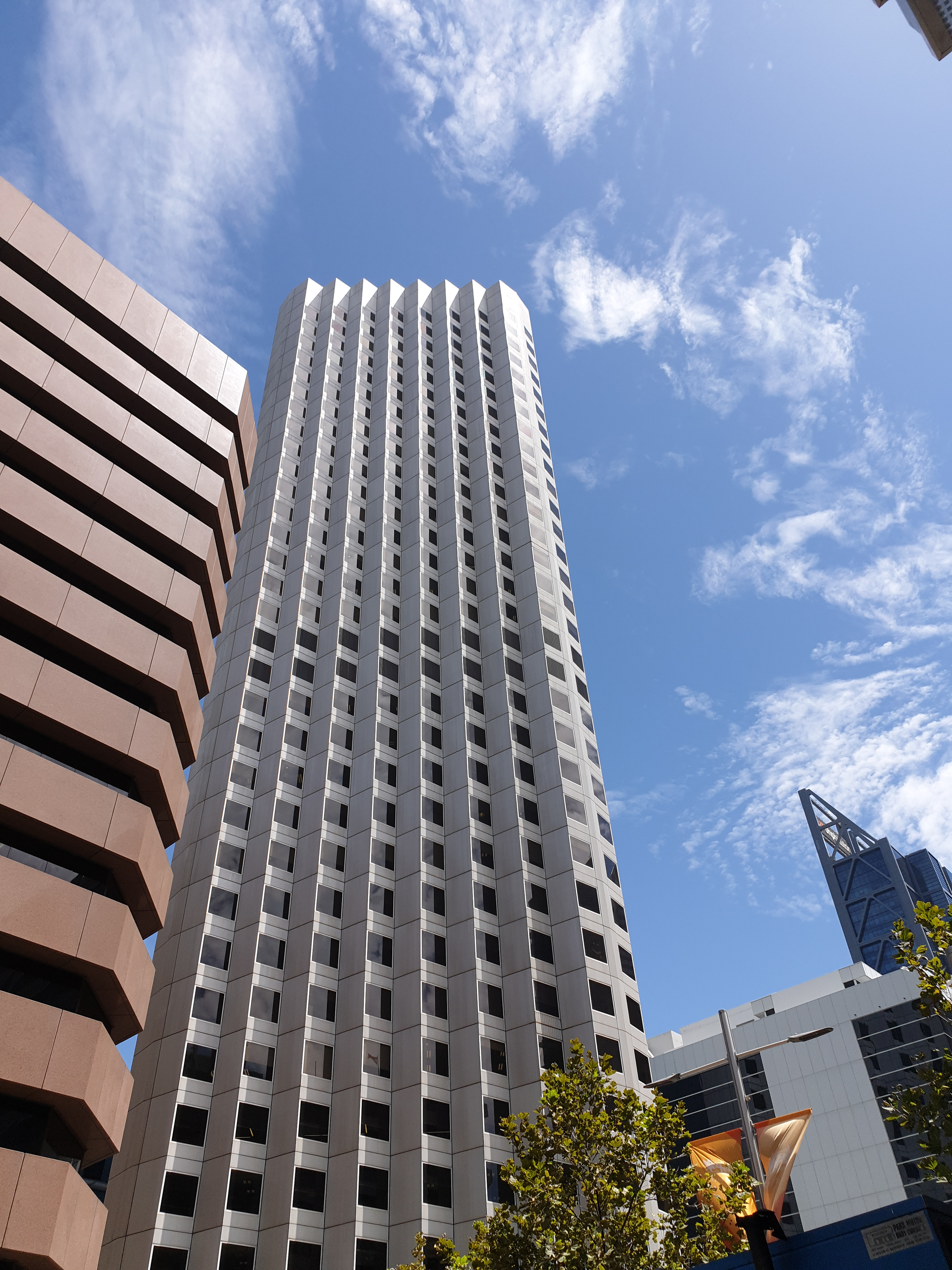
Allendale Square, with its stepped walls and V-shaped protrusions

The construction of tall buildings increased in the 1970s, with commercial high-rises able to regularly reach 100 m (328 ft) in height. Between 1976 and 1978, the title of Perth's tallest building changed hands three times in a span of three years, first with the AMP Building (now 140 St Georges Terrace) in 1976. The 30-storey, 131 m (430 ft) skyscraper was built for AMP Limited, replacing the six-storey "AMP Chambers" that had stood since 1915. Only a year after the AMP Building had been completed, Allendale Square overtook it by a metre in 1977. Upon its opening, the 31-storey, 132 m (433 ft) tower was the largest fully aluminium-clad freestanding tower in Australia, and one of the largest in the world. It has been described as "timeless" and a "fine example" of high-rise architecture. In 1978, it lost the title of Perth's tallest to St Martins Tower. At 140 m (460 ft) tall, St Martins Tower features a revolving restaurant, C Restaurant, the only one of its kind in Western Australia.

High-rise development entered into a slowdown in the late 1970s and continued until the mid-1980s, potentially affected by the 1973–1975 recession. Construction resumed in the late 1980s with the completion of three of Perth's tallest buildings at the time. The first was 108 St Georges Terrace (opening as Bond Tower or R&I Tower, as both logos were on the building's exterior at the time). Completed in 1988, the tower's prime location was the site of the first licensed premises in Perth from the 1830s. The skyscraper preserves the 1897 Palace Hotel at its base. A public campaign, with a group known as the Palace Guards, had opposed the demolition of the Palace Hotel after initial plans for the site were made in 1972. The skyscraper's design is known for its triangular shape and diagonal roof.

The next of these buildings was QV1, completed in 1991. It was among the westernmost skyscrapers in Perth at the time, and some suggested it was too far west in the central business district; however, it was fully leased by 1996. The building's modernist design has drawn criticism, and it has been labelled "Perth's most ugly building", while architect Harry Seidler described it as "the best building he had ever built". In 1992, Perth's current tallest building, Central Park, was completed. It was also the fourth tallest building in Australia at the time. The 1987 approval of the building was controversial due to plot ratio concessions made by the city council, as well as the developer requesting more parking bays than was allowed by the council's town planning scheme. Today, the tower is considered one of Australia's "finest modern landmark office towers", known for its distinctive setbacks. The early 1990s recession led to another slowdown in high-rise construction, lasting until the mid-2000s. New office towers would not be fully leased, with Central Park facing a sluggish office rental market, experiencing high vacancy rates for several years.

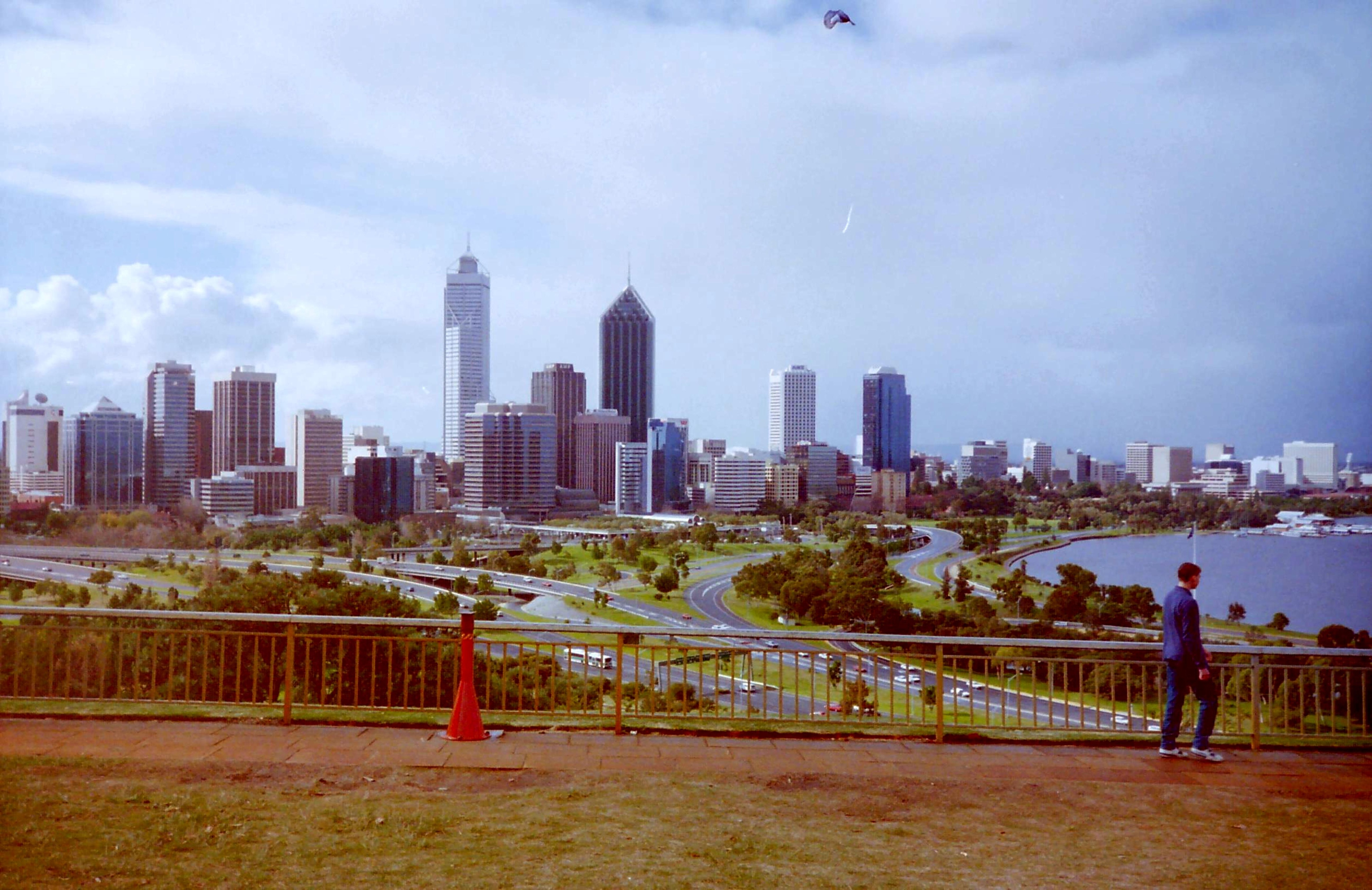
Perth's skyline in 1995

In 1994, the city council vacated the Council House building to allow for the removal of asbestos. Commissioners appointed by the Western Australian government to oversee the break-up of the city council voted to demolish the high-rise, planning to extend Stirling Gardens right across the site to beside Government House. This provoked calls to save the building, supported by the Royal Australian Institute of Architects; however, Graham Kierath, the Minister for Heritage, refused to place the building on the WA Register of Heritage Places. A feasibility study in 1995 recommended to refurbish the building instead, and this plan was approved in 1996. The building was "stripped back to bare bones" and the tiny tiles coating the building's distinctive T-shaped fins were removed, repaired, and re-glued to the surface. The city council moved back into the building in 1999.

=== 2000s–present ===
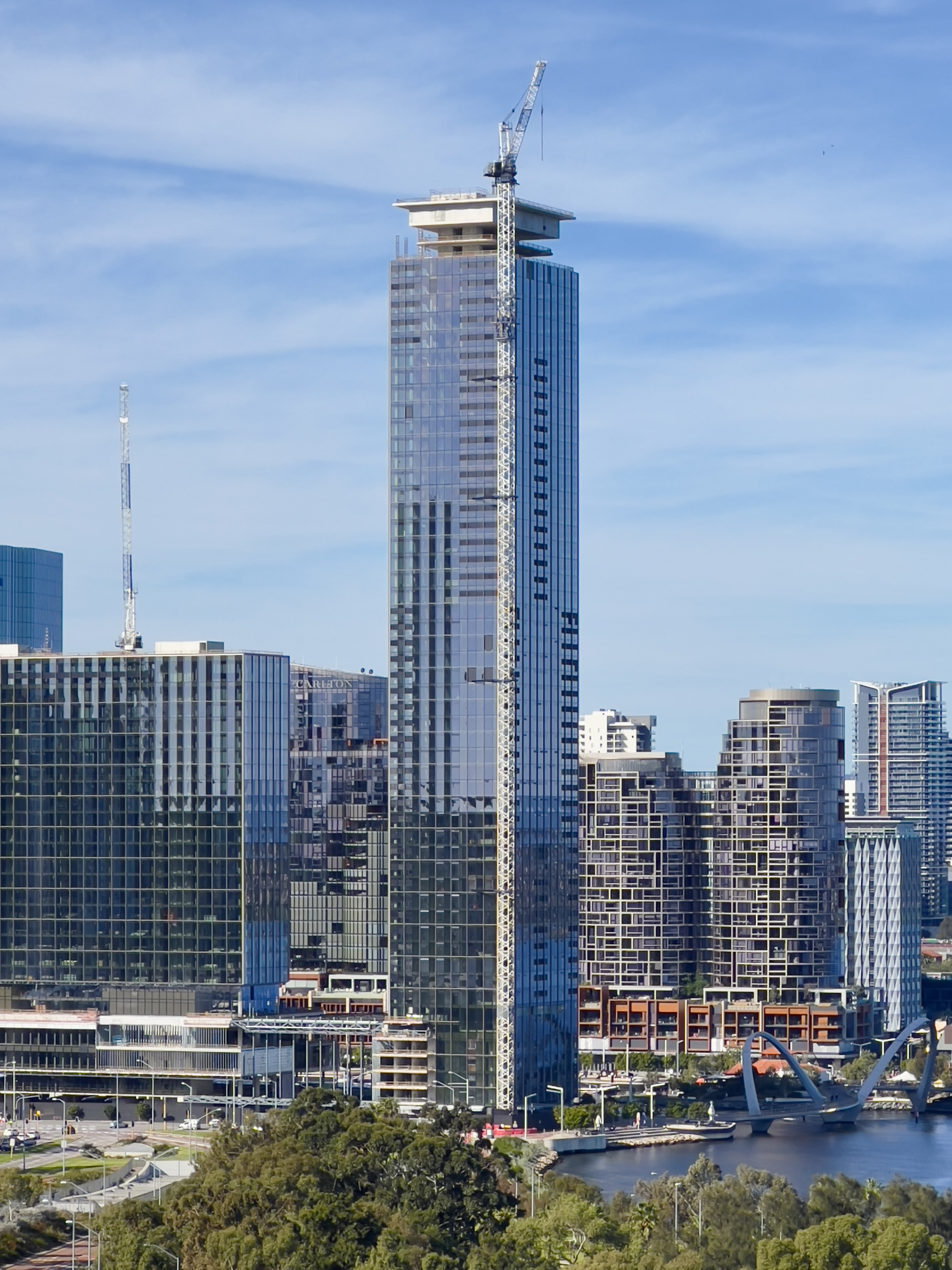
EQ West under construction in 2023

High-rise construction catiously returned with the completion of Woodside Plaza (now 240 St Georges Terrace) in 2003, the first premium-grade skyscraper completed in Perth since Central Park in 1992. This was followed by 100 St Georges Terrace in 2009, the first office building constructed in Perth to a 4.5-star Australian Building Greenhouse Rating.

In the 2010s, Perth would undergo a building boom that significantly increased the size and extent of its skyline. Perth's second tallest building, Brookfield Place, was completed in 2012; its major tenant is BHP, a multinational mining and metals company. The building terminates in a tapered structural roof crown, echoing the shape of Perth's other notable skyscrapers such as 108 St Georges Terrace. In addition to new office towers, more residential and hotel skyscrapers were built at a greater height, such as Elevation Tower, which became the city's tallest residential building in 2010. Residential developments in East Perth such as Elevation Tower, Concerto (2017), and Vue Tower (2019) extended the central skyline to the east.

One of the largest recent development projects is that of Elizabeth Quay, involving the construction of an artificial inlet on what was previously the Esplanade Reserve, along the Swan River. Construction began in 2012 and is ongoing; so far, notable skyscrapers built on the site include a Ritz Carlton hotel (2019) and One The Esplanade (2023). Currently rising will be two of Perth's five tallest buildings: EQ West, planned to be completed in 2026 at 186 m (610 ft) tall, and Lot 4 EQ, which will be 212 m (696 ft) tall.

The 2010s and 2020s has also seen a growth in high-rises located outside of central Perth, most notably across the Swan River in South Perth, where the 147.5 m (484 ft) tall Civic Heart was completed in 2024, now the tallest residential building in Perth and the tallest building outside of the central business district. In Burswood, a 500-room hotel was completed at the Crown Perth resort and casino at a height of 105 m (344 ft). In the suburbs of Applecross and Mount Pleasant, at the western entrance of the Canning Bridge, several new residential high-rises have gone up since the late 2010s. such as Cirque Duet and Sabina Applecross.

== Map of tallest buildings ==
This map displays the location of buildings taller than 100 m (328 ft) in central Perth. Each marker is coloured by the decade of the building's completion. There are only two buildings in Perth taller than 100 m (328 ft) that are located outside the CBD and the adjacent suburb of East Perth: Crown Perth, which is in Burswood, and Civic Plaza, which is in South Perth.

Buildings taller than 100 m (328 ft) in Perth's central business district. An asterisk (*) next to the building's name indicates it is located outside the map.
- 1970s
- 1980s
- 1990s
- 2000s
- 2010s
- 2020s
1 Central Park
2 Brookfield Place
3 108 St Georges Terrace
4 QV1
5 David Malcolm Justice Centre
6 Civic Heart*
7 Exchange Plaza
8 Mia Yellagonga Tower 3
9 St Martins Tower
10 Woodside Plaza
11 One The Esplande
12 Allendale Square
13 140 St Georges Terrace
14 Mia Yellagonga Tower 1
15 The Switch
16 Concerto
17 Vue Tower
18 Equus
19 221 St Georges Terrace
20 Governor Stirling Tower
21 Westin Hotel
22 Telstra Exchange
23 Bankwest Place
24 Crown Towers*
25 Ritz Carlton Hotel
26 100 St Georges Terrace
27 Elevation Tower
28 Perth Hub
29 At238
30 NV Apartments

== Cityscape ==
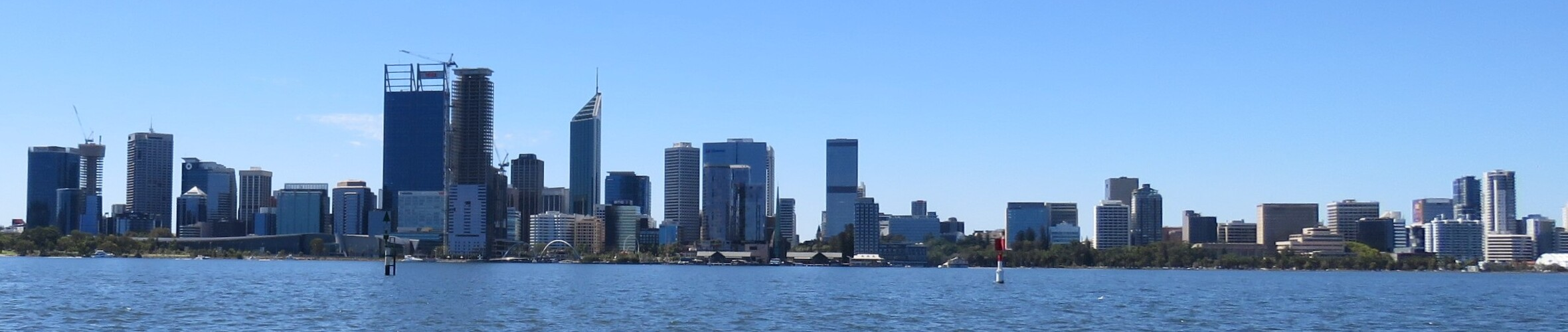
Panorama of Perth's skyline on the Swan River in 2023, seen from South Perth

== Tallest buildings ==
This list ranks completed buildings in Perth that stand at least 100 m (324 ft) tall as of 2026, based on standard height measurement. This includes spires and architectural details but does not include antenna masts. The "Year” column indicates the year of completion. Buildings tied in height are sorted by year of completion with earlier buildings ranked first, and then alphabetically.

Was the tallest building in Perth upon completion

Rank	Name	Image	Location	Height m (ft)	Floors	Year	Purpose	Notes
1	Central Park		CBD 152–158 St Georges Terrace 31°57′13″S 115°51′20″E	252.9 (830)	52	1992	Office	Tallest building in Perth since 1992. Tallest building completed in Perth in the 1990s.
2	Brookfield Place		CBD 125 St Georges Terrace 31°57′18″S 115°51′17″E	234.4 (769)	45	2012	Office	Tallest building completed in Perth in the 2010s.
3	108 St Georges Terrace		CBD 108 St Georges Terrace 31°57′16″S 115°51′26″E	214 (702)	50	1988	Office	Tallest building in Perth from 1988 to 1992. Formerly known as the Bankwest Tower. Tallest building completed in Perth in the 1980s.
4	QV1		CBD 250 St Georges Terrace 31°57′09″S 115°51′03″E	162.6 (533)	38	1991	Office	
5	David Malcolm Justice Centre		CBD 28 Barrack Street 31°57′19″S 115°51′38″E	149 (489)	35	2015	Office	
6	Civic Heart		South Perth 99 Mill Point Road 31°58′23″S 115°51′03″E	147.5 (484)	37	2024	Residental	Tallest residential building in Perth. Tallest building in South Perth.
7	Exchange Plaza		CBD 2 The Esplanade 31°57′23″S 115°51′31″E	146 (479)	40	1992	Office	
8	Mia Yellagonga Tower 3		CBD 1 Spring Street 31°57′17″S 115°51′02″E	141 (463)	37	2024	Office	Also known as Capital Square Tower 3.
9	St Martins Tower		CBD 44 St Georges Terrace 31°57′18″S 115°51′34″E	140 (459)	33	1978	Office	Tallest building in Perth from 1978 to 1988. Tallest building completed in Perth in the 1970s.
10	240 St Georges Terrace		CBD 240 St Georges Terrace 31°57′10″S 115°51′06″E	137 (449)	28	2003	Office	Tallest building completed in Perth in the 2000s.
11	One The Esplande		CBD 1 The Esplanade 31°57′26″S 115°51′30″E	133 (436)	29	2023	Office	Also known as Chevron Tower.
12	Allendale Square		CBD 77 St Georges Terrace 31°57′21″S 115°51′29″E	132 (433)	31	1977	Office	Tallest building in Perth from 1977 to 1978.
13	140 St Georges Terrace		CBD 140 St Georges Terrace 31°57′15″S 115°51′23″E	131 (430)	30	1976	Office	Tallest building in Perth from 1976 to 1977. Formerly known as the AMP Building or AMP Centre.
14	Mia Yellagonga Tower 1		CBD 11 Mount Street 31°57′14″S 115°51′00″E	130 (430)	32	2018	Office	Also known as One Capital Square.
15	The Switch		CBD 553-561 Wellington Street 31°57′04″S 115°51′25″E	124.8 (409)	39	2022	Residential	Also known as Switch Perth.
16	Concerto		East Perth 189 Adelaide Terrace 31°57′35″S 115°52′10″E	117 (384)	37	2017	Residential	Also known as Symphony City. Tallest building in East Perth.
17	Garden Tower		East Perth 110 Plain Street 31°57′35″S 115°52′10″E	117 (384)	38	2026	Residential	
18	Vue Tower		East Perth 63 Adelaide Terrace 31°57′40″S 115°52′30″E	112.7 (370)	34	2019	Residential	
19	Equus		CBD 580 Hay Street 31°57′15″S 115°51′41″E	111 (364)	27	2011	Mixed-use	Mixed-use residential and office building. Tallest mixed-use building in Perth.
20	221 St Georges Terrace		CBD 221 St Georges Terrace 31°57′13″S 115°51′07″E	110 (361)	30	1990	Office	Also known as the Forrest Centre.
21	Governor Stirling Tower		CBD 197 St Georges Terrace 31°57′14″S 115°51′09″E	110 (361)	28	1978	Office	
22	Westin Hotel		CBD 480 Hay Street 31°57′19″S 115°51′52″E	107 (351)	28	2017	Hotel	Tallest hotel building in Perth.
23	Telstra Exchange		CBD 625 Wellington Street 31°57′02″S 115°51′14″E	106 (348)	17	1979	Communication	
24	Bankwest Place		CBD 306 Murray Street 31°57′06″S 115°51′27″E	106 (348)	22	2011	Office	Sits atop Raine Square. Also known simply as Raine Square.
25	Crown Towers		Burswood Great Eastern Highway 31°57′34″S 115°53′38″E	105 (344)	21	2016	Hotel	Tallest building in Burswood.
26	Ritz Carlton Hotel		CBD 1 Barrack Street 31°57′29″S 115°51′29″E	103.1 (338)	28	2019	Hotel	
27	100 St Georges Terrace		CBD 100 St Georges Terrace 31°57′17″S 115°51′28″E	103 (338)	23	2009	Office	Also known as ENEX100.
28	Elevation Tower		CBD 237 Adelaide Terrace 31°57′30″S 115°52′00″E	103 (338)	30	2010	Residential	
29	Perth Hub	–	CBD 80 Milligan Street 31°56′56″S 115°51′12″E	103 (338)	32	2024	Residental	
30	At238		CBD 240 Adelaide Terrace 31°57′28″S 115°52′01″E	102 (335)	31	2023	Residential	
31	NV Apartments		CBD 374/396 Murray Street 31°57′04″S 115°51′16″E	100 (328)	33	2020	Residential	

== Tallest under construction or approved ==
=== Under construction ===
This list ranks completed buildings in Perth that stand at least 100 m (328 ft) tall as of 2026, based on standard height measurement. This includes spires and architectural details but does not include antenna masts. The "Year" column indicates the year of completion.

Name	Location	Height m (ft)	Floors	Year	Purpose	Notes
EQ West	CBD	186 (610)	53	2027	Residential	Topped Out
UniLodge 609 Wellington	CBD	110 (360)	33	2027	PBSA	Under Construction.
Kings Square 6	CBD	110 (360)	33	2028	PBSA	Site Works
Lumiere	South Perth	101 (331)	30	2028	Residential	Under Construction.

=== Approved ===
The following table ranks approved skyscrapers in Perth that are expected to be at least 100 m (328 ft) tall as of 2026 based on standard height measurement. The "Year" column indicates the expected year of completion. A dash "–" indicates information about the building’s height or year of completion is not available.

Name	Location	Height m (ft)	Floors	Purpose	Year	Status	Notes
St. Andrew's	CBD	234 (768)	62	Hotel	–	Approved	
Lot 4 Elizabeth Quay	CBD	212 (696)	54	Mixed Use	–	Approved	
Milligan Square	CBD	165 (541)	50	PBSA	–	Proposed	
1 Mill Street	CBD	146 (479)	33	Mixed Use	–	Proposed	
Carillon City	CBD	134 (440)	38	Mixed Use	–	Approved	
108 Stirling	Northbridge	129 (423)	34	Mixed Use	–	Approved	
Subiaco East	Subiaco	128 (420)	36	Residential	2029	Approved	
88 Mill Point	South Perth	123 (404)	36	Residential	–	Approved	
15 The Esplande	CBD	123 (404)	27	Office	2030	Approved	
Kings Square 5	CBD	114 (374)	27	Office	–	Approved	
Murray Tower	CBD	110 (361)	33	Residental	–	Approved	
City Tower	Burswood	109 (358)	32	Residental		Approved	
White Sands	Scarborough	103 (338)	29	Residential	–	Approved	
Perth Girls School West Tower	East Perth	100 (330)	25	PBSA	2029	Approved	

== Timeline of tallest buildings ==
This following is a list of buildings that once held the title of the tallest building in Perth.

Name	Image	Years as tallest	Height m (ft)	Floors	Notes
CML Building	–	1936–1962	50 (160)	11	Demolished in 1980.
Citibank House		1962–1970	68 (223)	18	Formerly known as T & G Building
Parmelia House		1970–1973	80 (260)	20	
Pan Pacific Perth Hotel		1973–1976	90 (300)	24	Formerly known as Sheraton Hotel
140 St Georges Terrace		1976–1977	131 (430)	30	Formerly known as AMP Building
Allendale Square		1977–1978	132 (433)	31	
St Martins Tower		1978–1988	140 (460)	33	
108 St Georges Terrace		1988–1992	214 (702)	50	Formerly known as R & I Tower and Bankwest Tower
Central Park		1992–present	249 (817)	52	Current tallest building in Perth

== Skylines ==
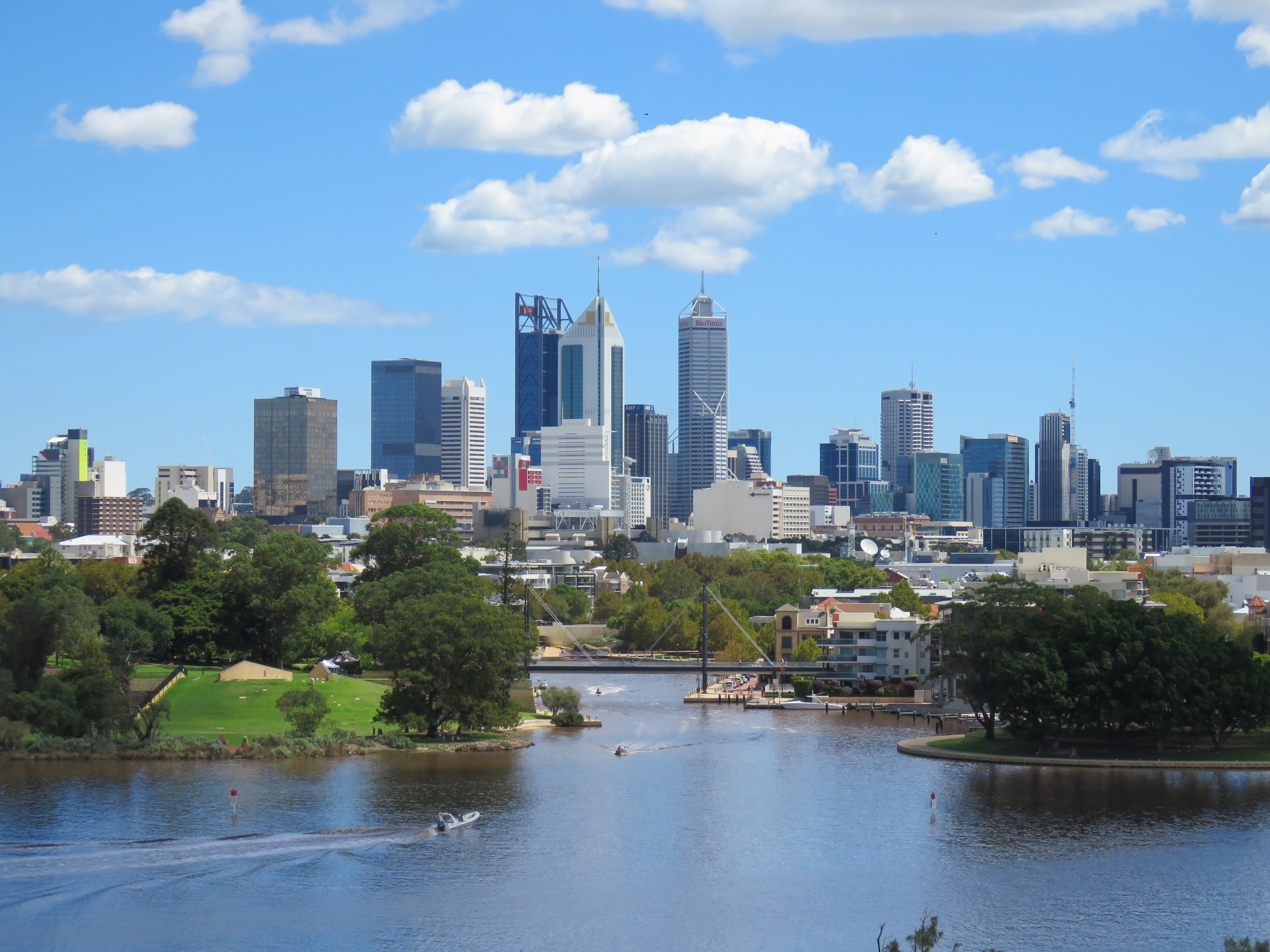
Perth CBD

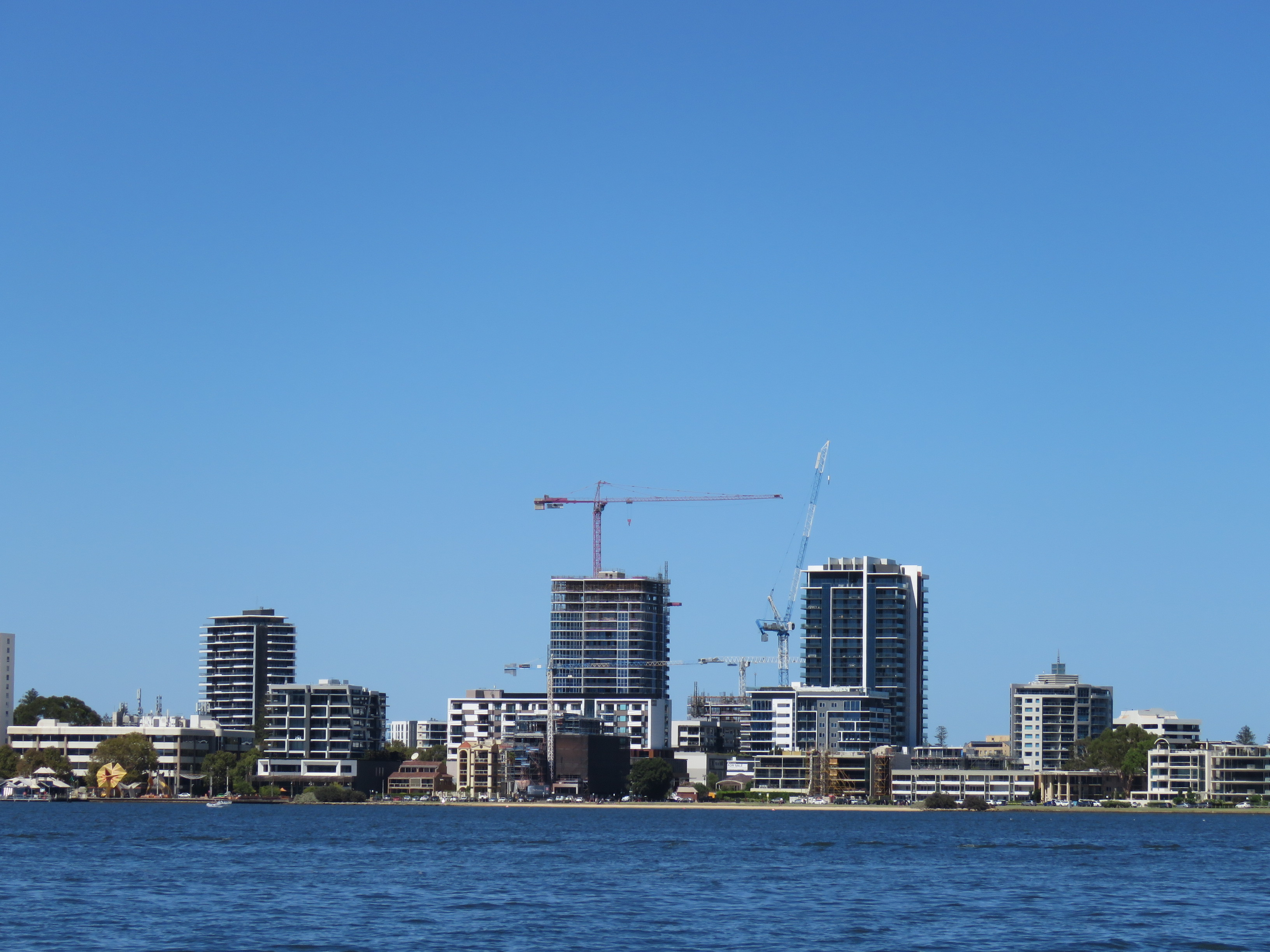
South Perth

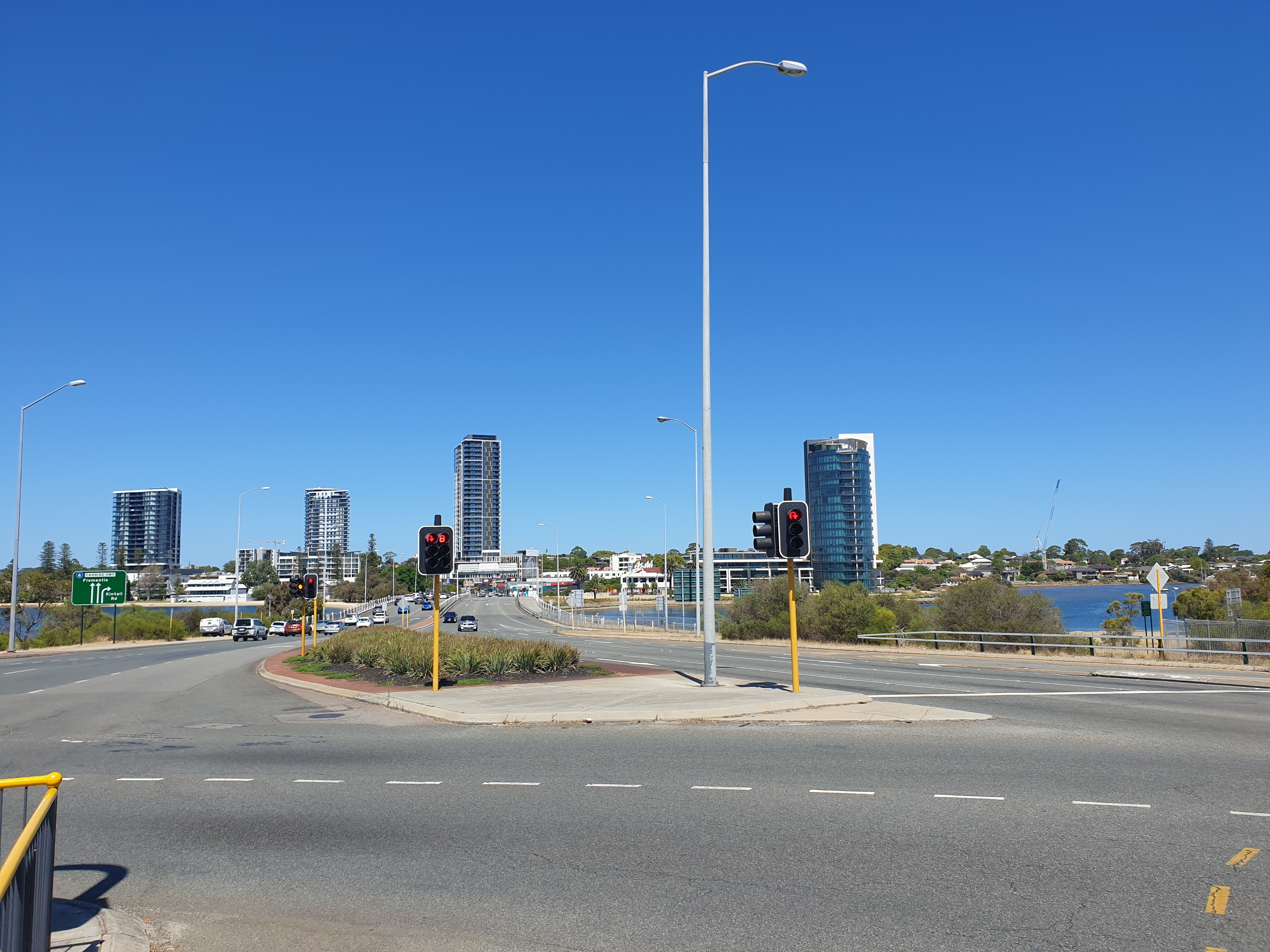
Canning Bridge

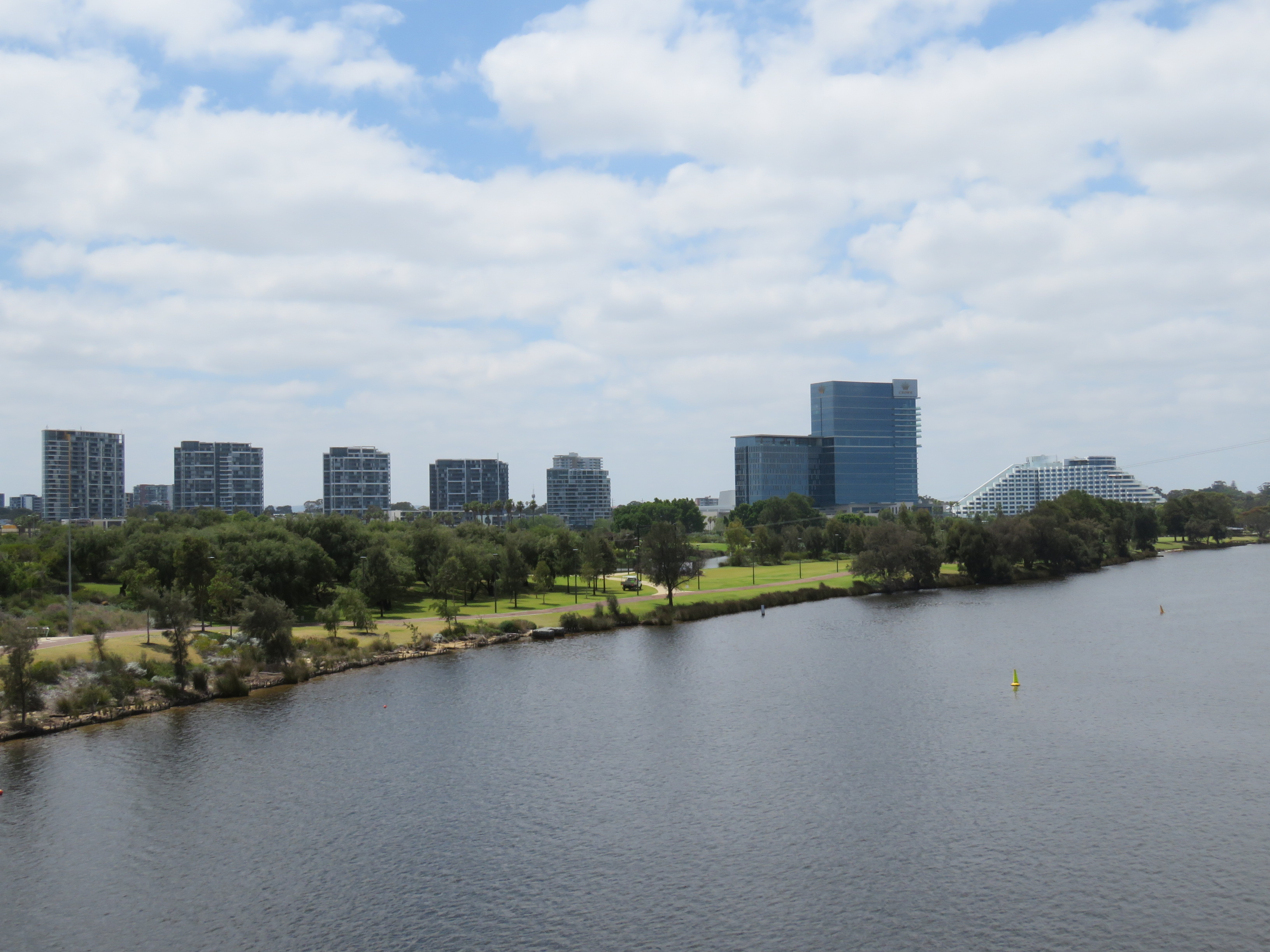
Burswood

== See also ==
- Architecture of Western Australia
- List of tallest buildings in Australia
- List of tallest buildings in Oceania
