= Civic Heart =

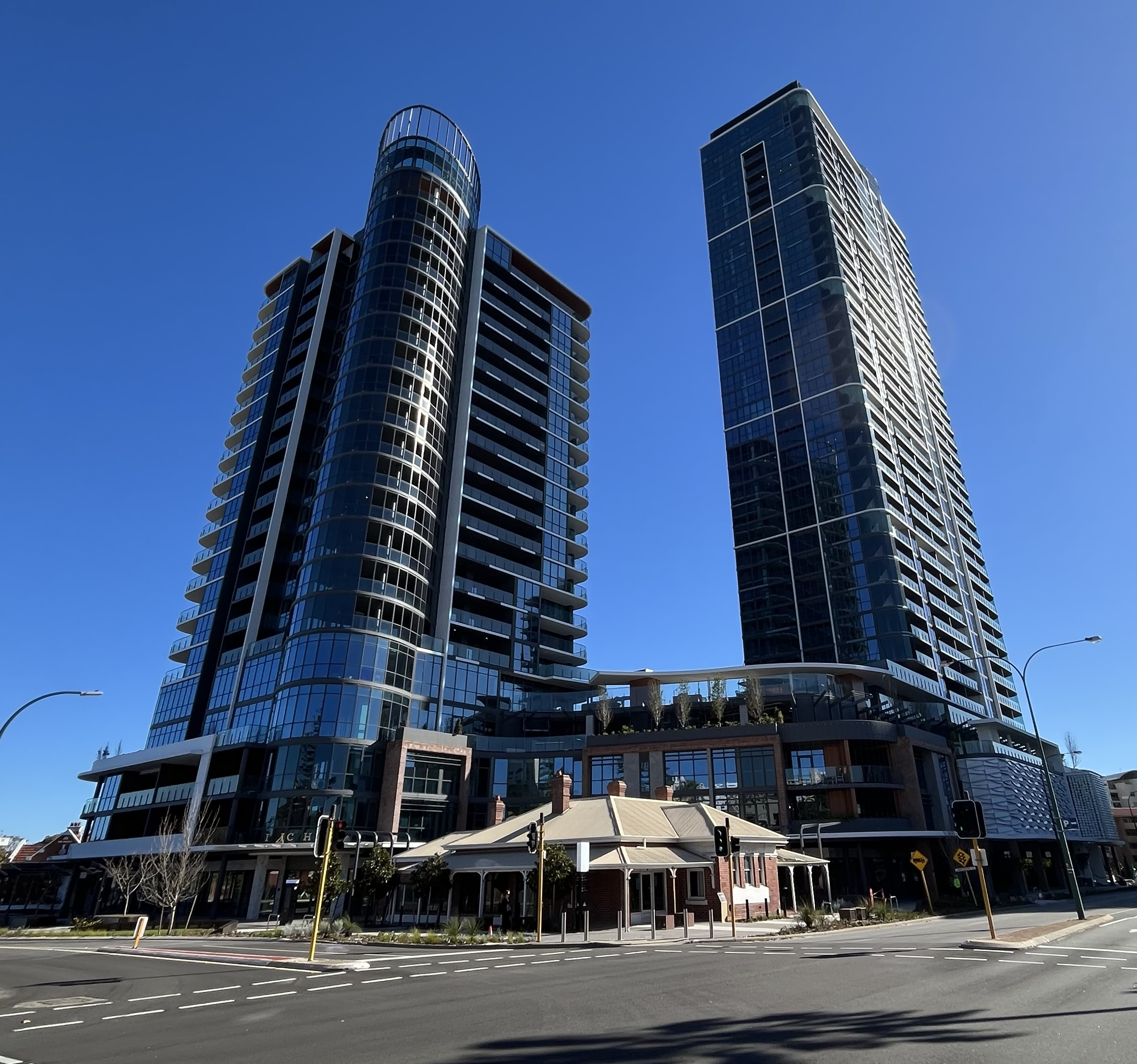
- Civic Heart viewed from the corner of Mill Point Road and Mends Street

General information
- Address: 1 Mends Street / 99 Mill Point Road, South Perth, Western Australia
- Coordinates: 31.9733°S 115.8514°E
- Groundbreaking: 12 January 2021
- Topped-out: 21 December 2023
- Completed: June 2024
- Cost: A$445 million
- Owner: Finbar
- Height: 147.5 m (484 ft)

Technical details
- Floor count: 37

Website
- civicheart.com.au

Civic Heart is a complex of apartment towers in South Perth, Western Australia, constructed between 2021 and 2024 by Finbar. The complex has two towers, the tallest of which is 147.5 metres (484 ft), making Civic Heart the tallest building in South Perth, the tallest building in Perth outside the central business district, and the tallest residential building in Perth. It was estimated to cost A$445 million to construct.

== Description ==
Civic Heart is surrounded by Mill Point Road, Labouchere Road, and Mends Street, in South Perth, Western Australia. The complex has two towers, 20 and 37 stories tall. The tallest tower is 147.5 metres (484 ft) in height, making Civic Heart the tallest building in South Perth, the tallest building in Perth outside the central business district, and the tallest residential building in Perth. It was estimated to cost A$445 million to construct. The complex has 309 apartments and 26 commercial tenancies. At ground level is the former South Perth police station, which is listed on the State Register of Heritage Places.

== History ==
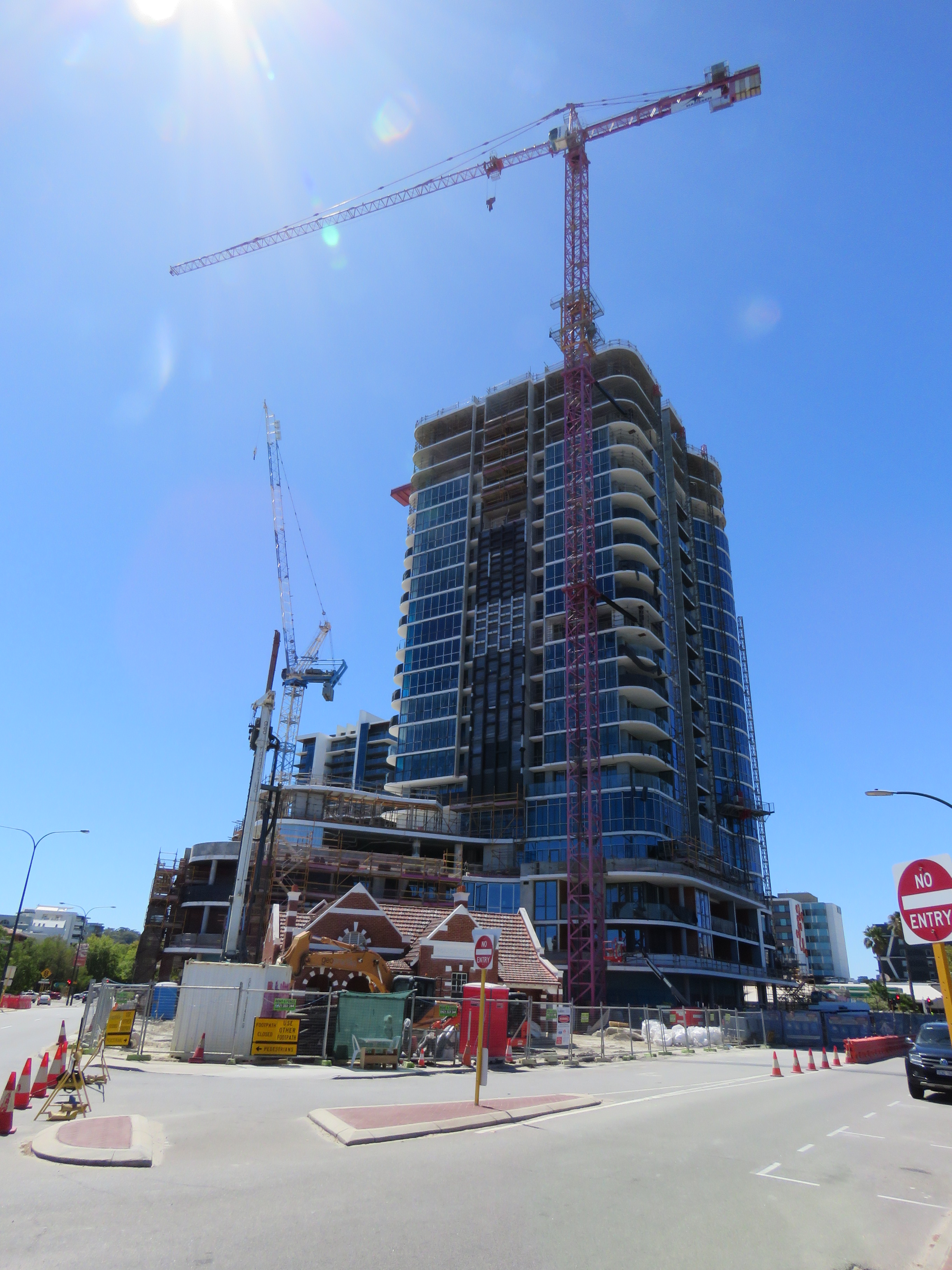
Civic Heart southern tower under construction in February 2023, with the heritage-listed police station in the foreground

The Civic Heart proposal was revived in January 2019.

Civic Heart was rejected by a Joint Development Assessment Panel in October 2019 for not being "exemplary". Finbar said it intended to appeal to the State Administrative Tribunal. The development was approved by Planning Minister Rita Saffioti using call-in powers in February 2020. The decision to approve the development was controversial, with local group Save the South Perth Peninsula describing the decision as "appalling". Finbar managing director Darren Pateman accused the group of being "NIMBYs".

A ground breaking ceremony occurred on 12 January 2021. The building topped out in December 2023, with an official ceremony on 21 December 2023. Civic Heart officially reached completion in June 2024.
