= EQ West =

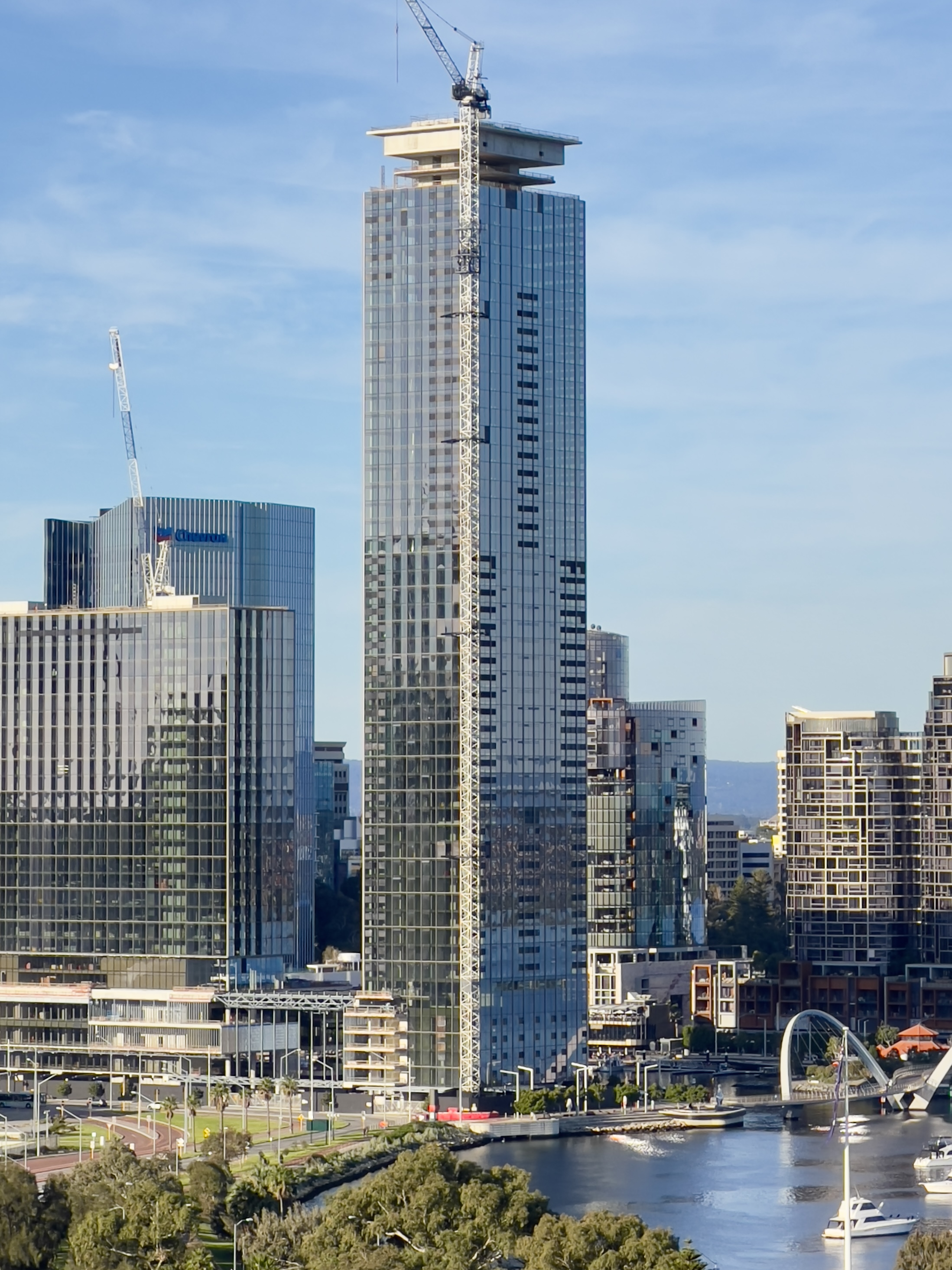
- Construction in 2023, viewed from Kings Park

General information
- Location: Lots 2 and 3, Elizabeth Quay, Perth, Western Australia
- Coordinates: 31.958337°S 115.855179°E
- Construction started: 2019
- Cost: A$385M

Height
- Height: 186 m (610 ft)

Design and construction
- Architecture firm: Kerry Hill

EQ West is a pair of mixed-use skyscrapers under construction at Elizabeth Quay in Perth, Western Australia.

== History ==
Designs for EQ West were revealed in September 2016. It was designed by Kerry Hill Architects, and was to be developed by AAIG and Fini Group, known together as CA & Associates. Fini later exited the venture. It was to have 300 residential apartments, 170 short-stay apartments, a hotel, dining, retail, and a "high-rise public art museum".

Construction began in 2019. It had a forecast cost of A$385 million.

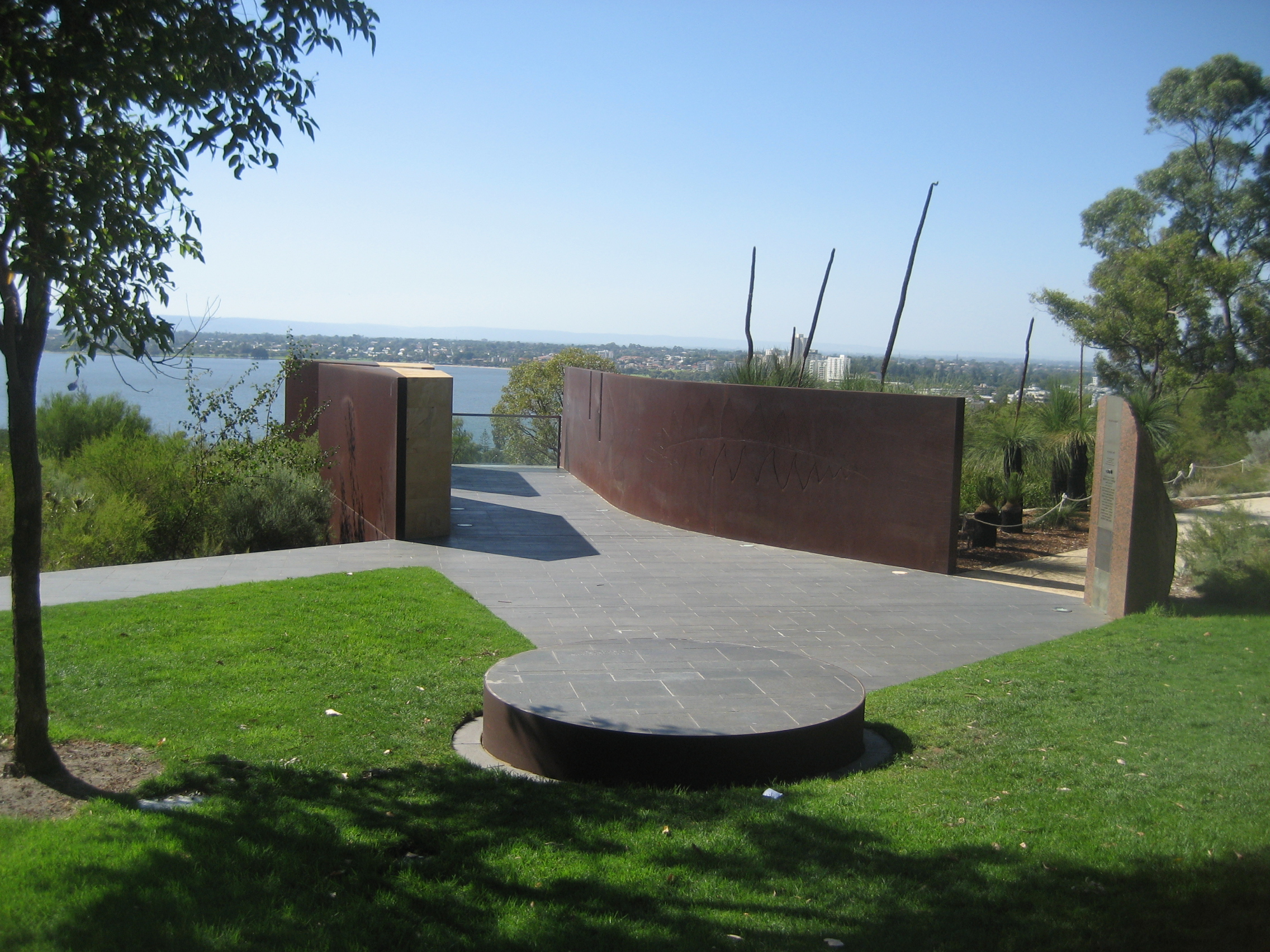
Bali bombings memorial at Kings Park

The building has been criticised for blocking sunlight to the 2002 Bali bombings memorial at Kings Park. The memorial was designed so that on October 12 each year, the sunrise would light up the names of each of the 16 Western Australian victims of the bombing.

Construction has encountered major delays which have been the subject of a dispute in the supreme court between the development company and subcontractor SRG Global.

In September 2025, DevelopmentWA CEO Dean Mudford said that construction would be complete by the end of 2025. When it is complete, it will be the fourth tallest building in Perth. In January 2026, the City of Perth expressed concern about the quality of work on components that would be handed back to the city. Premier of Western Australia Roger Cook expressed frustration at the building's slow progress. By this point, construction on the outside looked complete but the interior was incomplete.

== See also ==
- List of tallest buildings in Perth
