= Print Hall =

- Interactive map of Print Hall

Restaurant information
- Established: September 2012
- Chef: Shane Watson
- Food type: Modern Australian
- Rating: 1/3 stars
- Location: Brookfield Place; 125 St Georges Terrace, Perth, Western Australia, 6000, Australia
- Coordinates: 31°57′18″S 115°51′19″E
- Reservations: Yes
- Website: www.printhall.com.au

Print Hall is a four-level bar/restaurant at Brookfield Place in Perth, Western Australia. Opened in 2012, and housed in the former headquarters of Perth's daily newspaper, the West Australian, it has been described by the New York Times in 2014 as "one of the city's most celebrated new restaurants, ... featuring soaring ceilings and a bright white atrium." The establishment features Print Hall Bar, Print Hall Dining Room, Apple Daily Bar and Eating House, Bob's Bar and Small Print Baker and Roastery.

== Menu ==
Signature dishes at Print Hall include an entree of manna crab with Avruga caviar, served with toasted brioche, raw quail yolk, radish and aioli; and an entree of rare-roasted pigeon breast with radicchio, beetroot, seared chicken liver and shredded pigeon leg.

== Reception ==
The restaurant was given a one star rating in 2014, and the award for "Best New Restaurant", by The West Australian.

In 2015, the restaurant was the recipient of the Wine Spectator Grand Award.

== See also ==
- Australian cuisine
- C Restaurant
- Greenhouse (restaurant)
- Western Australian wine
