= Allendale Square =

Skyscraper in Perth, Western Australia

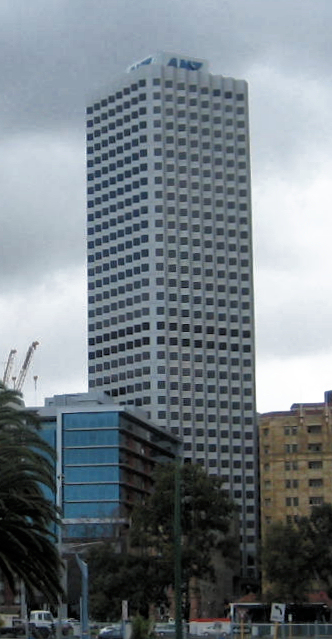
- Allendale Square
- Interactive map of the Allendale Square area

General information
- Status: Completed
- Type: Office
- Location: 77 St Georges Terrace, Perth, Western Australia
- Coordinates: 31°57′19.87″S 115°51′29.45″E
- Construction started: January 1973
- Completed: Construction completed January 1975
- Opening: 1976
- Owner: GE

Height
- Roof: 132 m (433 ft)

Technical details
- Floor count: 34 (including basements and plant floor)
- Floor area: 27,700 m^{2} (298,000 sq ft) (tower only)
- Lifts/elevators: 9 (plus one to basement car park)

Design and construction
- Architects: Cameron, Chisholm and Nicol
- Main contractor: Multiplex

Allendale Square is a 32-storey skyscraper in Perth, Western Australia. When opened in 1976, the 132-metre (433 ft) building surpassed the AMP Building to become the tallest completed building in Perth, a title which it only held until 1977 when St Martins Tower opened.

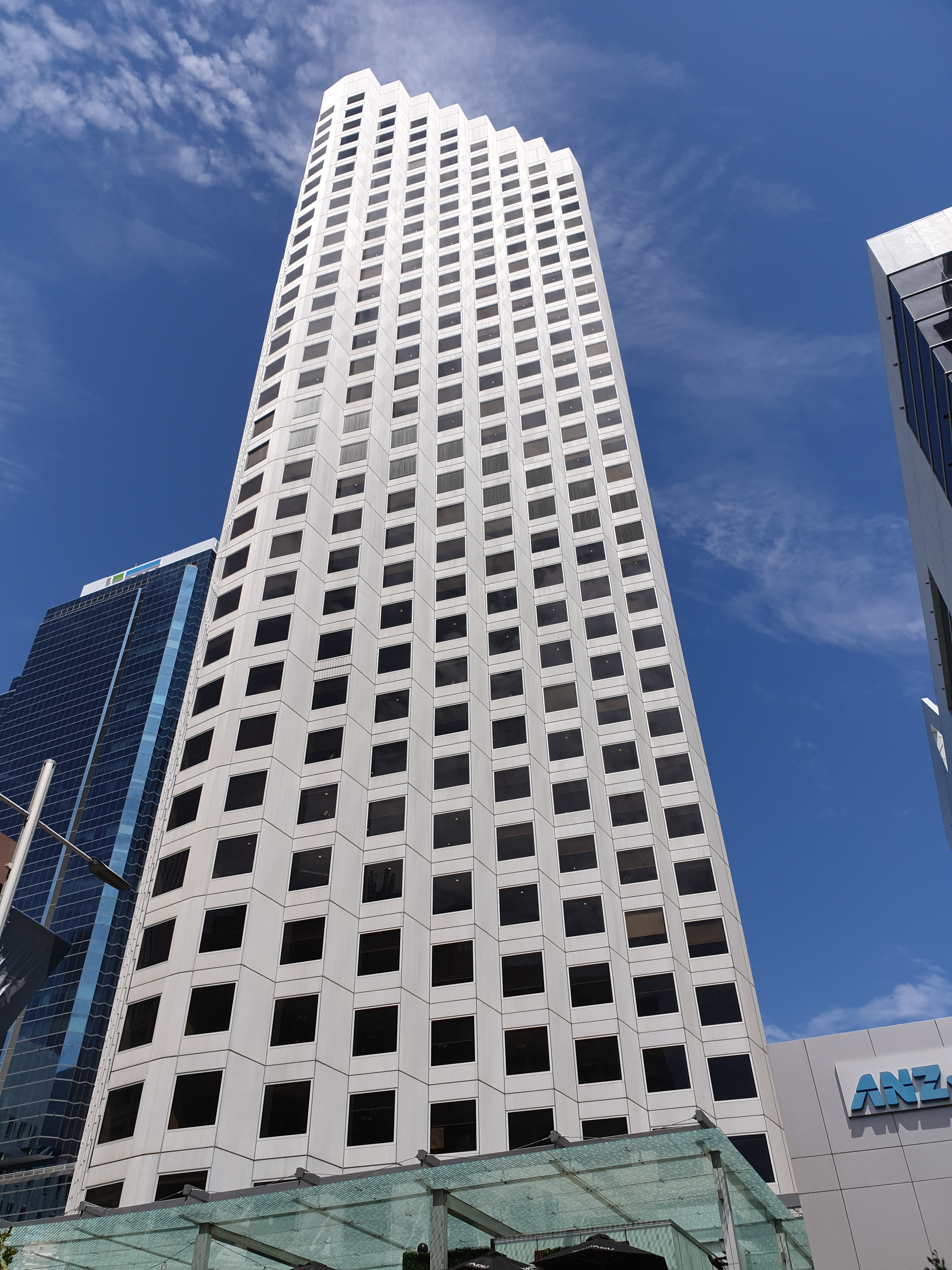
Allendale Square taken from St George's Tce

== Site history and construction ==
The corner of St Georges Terrace and Sherwood Court where Allendale Square now stands, was owned as early as 1829 by the Leake family. Later, it was home to Warwick House, the Bank of New South Wales, the Commercial Travellers Association and the Daily News Chambers. These buildings were demolished in 1972 for the construction of Allendale Square.

The tower, which was designed by Architects Cameron, Chisholm and Nicol, was built by Multiplex. The building's anodised aluminium cladding was extensively weather tested to ensure it could resist atmospheric corrosion. Although this cladding covers 70% of the exterior of the building, all cladding units were installed from inside the tower without the use of external scaffolding.

The building was officially opened by Premier Sir Charles Court on 3 August 1976. Also attending the opening were descendants of the Leake family which had owned the site from the earliest days of the colony.

== Post-completion ==
Allendale Square has been used for abseiling for charity down its side. The first of these events was held in November 2002, and its success led to it being held annually thereafter, until the change in the building's ownership forced the end of this charitable event. The tower has also been used as a base from which to launch shells in the City of Perth Skyworks annual fireworks display.

The building's prominent tenants include ANZ Bank (which also owns the signage rights over the building), Qantas and Francis Burt Chambers.

=== Ownership ===
A half share in the building was bought in 1988 by Armstrong Jones Perth Property Fund for A$41.63 million, equivalent to A$106.47 in 2022. This half share was later purchased for A$39.35 million by GEM Commercial Property Trust in 1995, which was acquired by the General Property Trust when it took over GEM in 1996. In mid-2000 General Property Trust put its half-share in the tower up for sale for A$44.25 million, but no offers it received came close, and it was forced to take the building off the market.

Meanwhile, in 1995, the other half share in the tower was acquired from an MLC Life fund by the Australian Prime Property Fund in a package that cost a total of A$125 million.

Western Australian property mogul Ralph Sarich's investment company Cape Bouvard Investments bought Allendale Square in two steps for A$93.03 million between 2001 and 2002. It bought half from the General Property Trust in September 2001 and the other half for A$48 million from Australian Prime Property Fund in April 2002.

Later, General Electric bought the tower in December 2006 for A$154 million from Cape Bouvard. GE put the tower up for sale in 2008, however the tower was taken off the market after none of the offers received met the desired A$200 million sale price. The tower was sold for A$231 million in May 2013 to Mirvac.

=== Refurbishments and complex expansion ===
The building has been refurbished three times since it opened in 1976. In 1989 the building underwent a minor refurbishment at a cost of A$1.5 million. Then, starting in 1999, the building underwent an extensive internal refurbishment which cost A$2.5 million. The project involved a refit of the lobby, replacement of lift cars and improvement to core services like lighting. Architect Anna Meszaros from firm Cameron Chisholm and Nicol was responsible for this refurbishment.

Most recently, the building was refurbished from 2001 to 2002, which also involved remodelling of the three-storey building adjacent to the tower. This involved an upgrade of some floors, the lobby and the adjoining ANZ Bank branch. The outdoor plaza was also to be revamped for the first time since the building was opened in 1976.

The complex was expanded with the completion in early 2006 of the Allendale II building on the site of the former CTA building at the rear of the Allendale Square site. This seven-storey building is connected to Allendale Square and its underground shopping centre, and boosted the total lettable space in the complex to 35,000 square metres (380,000 sq ft).

== Design ==
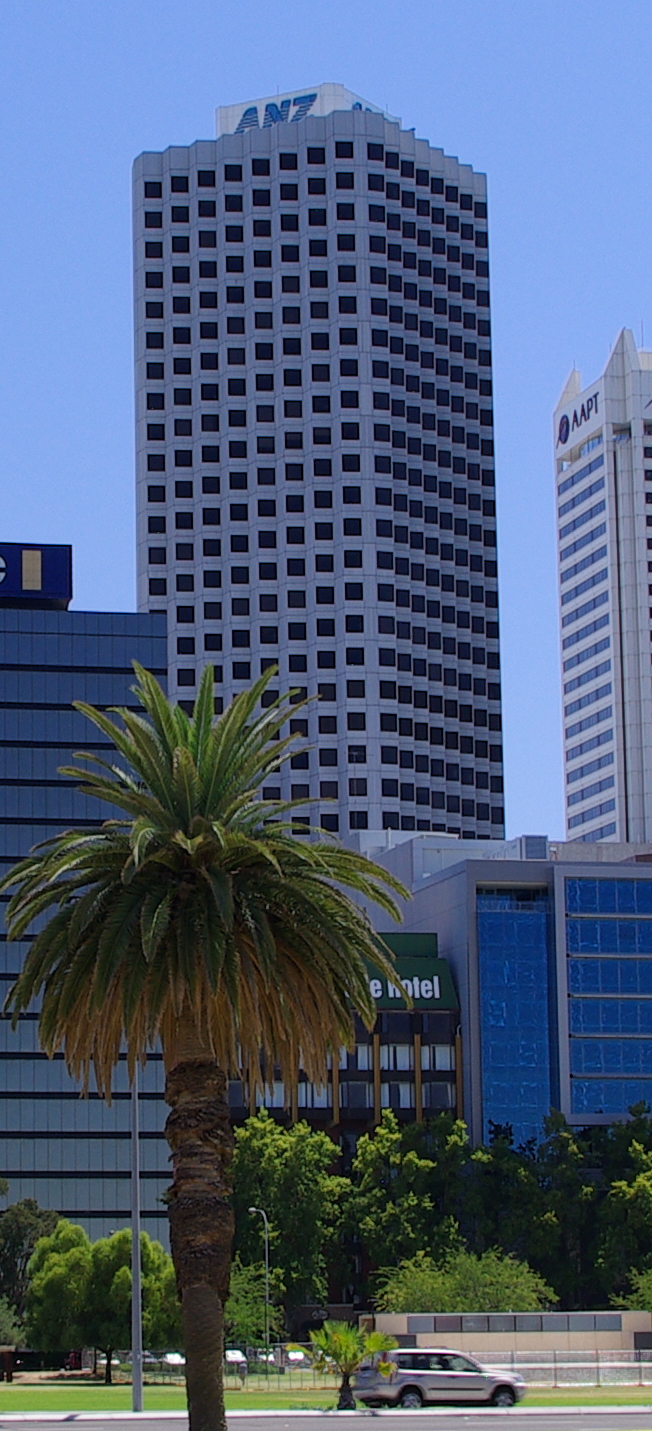
The south-facing windows of the tower

The tower is located on a 4,053-square-metre (43,630 sq ft) site, 15 metres (49 ft) above sea level, however the tower itself only occupies 25% of this land area. Designed by architects Cameron Chisholm Nicol, the building is rotated 45 degrees relative to St Georges Terrace, in order to secure a plot ratio concession from the Perth City Council.

The walls of the tower are stepped in plan, creating V-shaped protrusions along each face. In order to maximise views towards the Swan River whilst reducing heat loads, the building has windows only on the north and south-facing sides of these steps, and the remainder of the tower is clad with aluminium. The 400 tonnes (880,000 lb) of aluminium panels were created from locally mined bauxite, refined at Kwinana by Alco in the largest aluminium task ever undertaken in Australia at that time. On its opening, the building was the largest fully aluminium-clad freestanding tower in Australia, and one of the largest in the world.

The 992 windows of the tower are solar-bronze glass, up to 12.7 mm (0.50 in) thick on upper levels. Ninety percent of the tower's levels had uninterrupted views to the river upon its opening, and all of the office levels are free of internal columns. When it was opened, the tower's lobby had a red carpet at the entrance, high ceilings and marble columns.

In addition to a lift between the 99-bay basement car park and the lobby, the tower has nine high-speed lifts, divided into two zones. When the tower opened, these lifts were among the most advanced in the world, improving travelling times and halving the plant room space they required. The electronic security devices and air conditioning systems were also advanced. The roof of the building's mechanical penthouse, which is adorned with the ANZ Bank logo, is designed to be able to function as a helipad if necessary.

The building has 34 levels, made up of a basement car park, an underground retail arcade, the ground floor lobby, a conference suite, 29 office levels and the plant level at the top. The tower has 27,700 square metres (298,000 sq ft) of lettable space and a "spacious" lobby.

The building has been described as a "fine example" of high-rise architecture, "timeless", "one of Perth's most prominent office buildings", a building of "considerable elegance" and a good building in its time which still remains relevant.

...The basic design is innovative and displays both structural and technological sophistication. The tower and its associated concourse exhibit clarity of thought, consistent detailing and finishes of a high standard.

— 1978 Royal Australian Institute of Architects WA Design Award jury

== Awards ==
Allendale Square was named as one of the Top 20 Australian 20th century icon buildings by the Royal Australian Institute of Architects. The building has also won several architectural awards, including:

- 1977: Alcoa of Australia Award for Architecture;
- 1978: Royal Australian Institute of Architects Design Award;
- 1978: ACI Energy Conservation Award; and
- 1981: Royal Australian Institute of Architects (WA Chapter) Bronze Medal.
