= Mia Yellagonga =

Commercial precinct in Perth, Western Australia

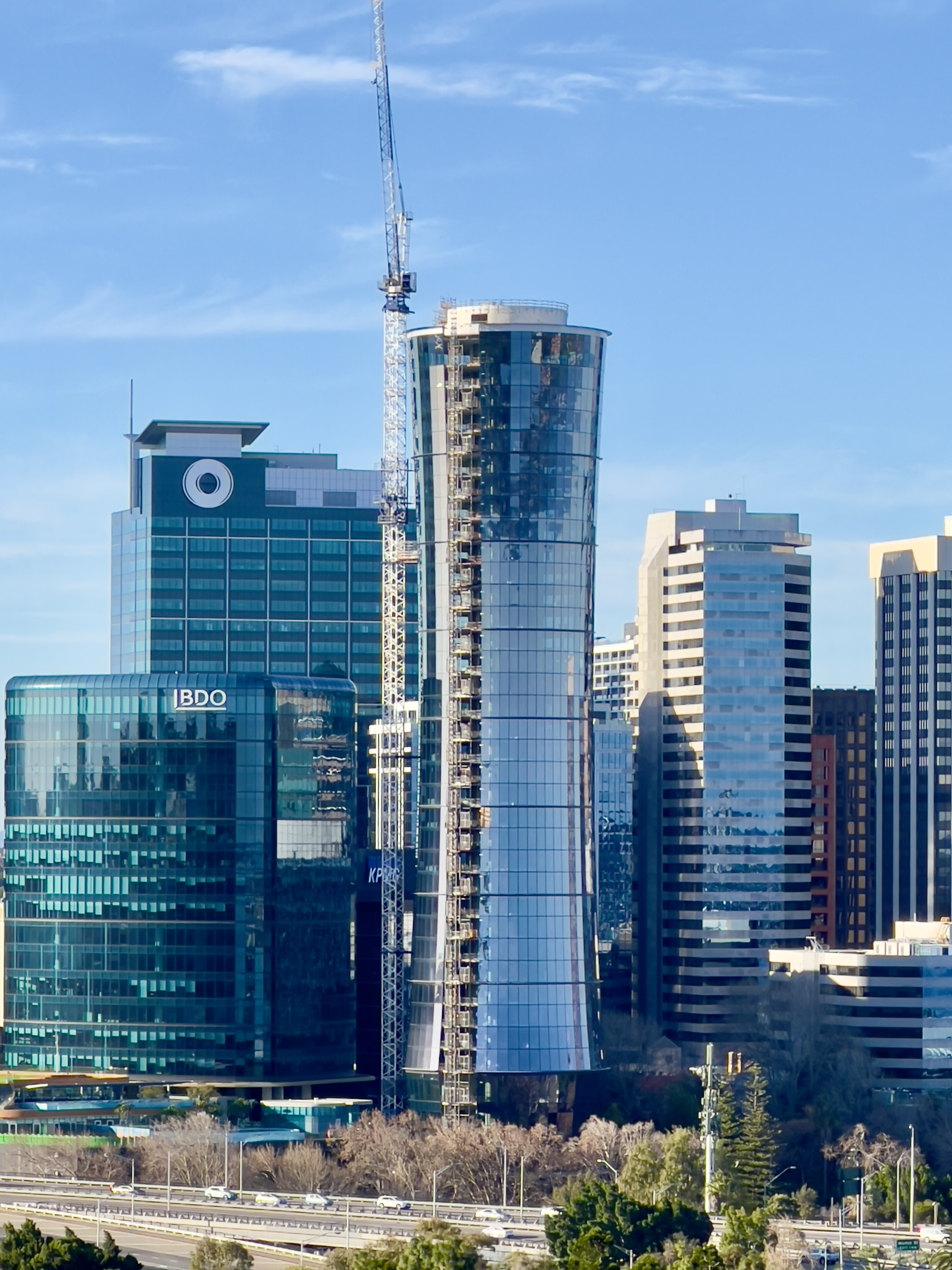
- Tower 2 completed and Tower 3 under construction in 2023.
- Interactive map of the Mia Yellagonga area
- Alternative names: Capital Square

General information
- Location: Tower 1 - 11 Mount St; Tower 2 - 5 Spring St; Tower 3 - 1 Spring St, Perth, Australia
- Coordinates: 31°57′14″S 115°51′00″E
- Completed: Tower 1 - 2018; Tower 2 - 2021; Tower 3 - 2024
- Owner: AAIG; Dexus (49% of Tower 1)

Mia Yellagonga, also known as Capital Square, is a three tower commercial precinct situated in Perth, Western Australia.

== Tower 1 and podium ==
In 2014 it was announced that Amalgamated Australian Investment Group (AAIG) would be building a new headquarters for Woodside Energy as part of a A$1 billion, equivalent to A$1.2 billion in 2022, development on the former site of the Emu Brewery. Previous to this, plans to build high-rise offices or apartments on the site has consistently fallen through for almost a quarter of a century, leading to the site being labelled "seemingly jinxed".

In 2018, Woodside moved from the previous headquarters at Woodside Plaza to the newly completed Mia Yellagonga precinct as the sole tenant. Mia is the Noongar word for 'place of', and Yellagonga is the name of the Whadjuk elder who welcomed Captain Stirling to the area at a site on the river nearby.

Tower 1, also known as Karlak, has 29 stories including two mid-rise building services floors and excluding two basement floors. The podium contains a 400-seat auditorium and end of trip facility with storage for over 700 bicycles.

== Tower 2 ==
Further development of the site by AAIG triggered a legal battle with Woodside in 2020 over changes to the proposed development since the signing of the Tower 1 lease in 2016. The second and third towers were originally planned to be hotels and apartments however the new proposal was for Tower 2 and Tower 3 to be mostly office space.

The 17-story tower (including a building services floor at the top and two lobby levels) was completed in late 2021. BDO has had signage rights for Tower 2 since 2022.

== Tower 3 ==
The final tower was completed in 2024, and is 36 stories high with a distinctive narrow hyperboloid shape. The building was required to be narrow to ensure the view from Parliament House to the river was not excessively obstructed as required by the Parliament House Precinct Policy. This hyperboloid shape was introduced after the City of Perth design advisory committee noted that the three towers as originally proposed (Tower 3 having more of a 'bullet' shape) were "not similar enough to really homogenise the design, nor different enough to create a meaningful composition".

== Sources ==
- Hatch, Dan (29 October 2008). "Leighton to build offices on Emu site". The West Australian. p. 67. "Perth City Council was expected last night to approve a two-tower office development on the seemingly jinxed old Emu Brewery site on Spring Street."
