= 140 St Georges Terrace =

Skyscraper in Perth, Western Australia

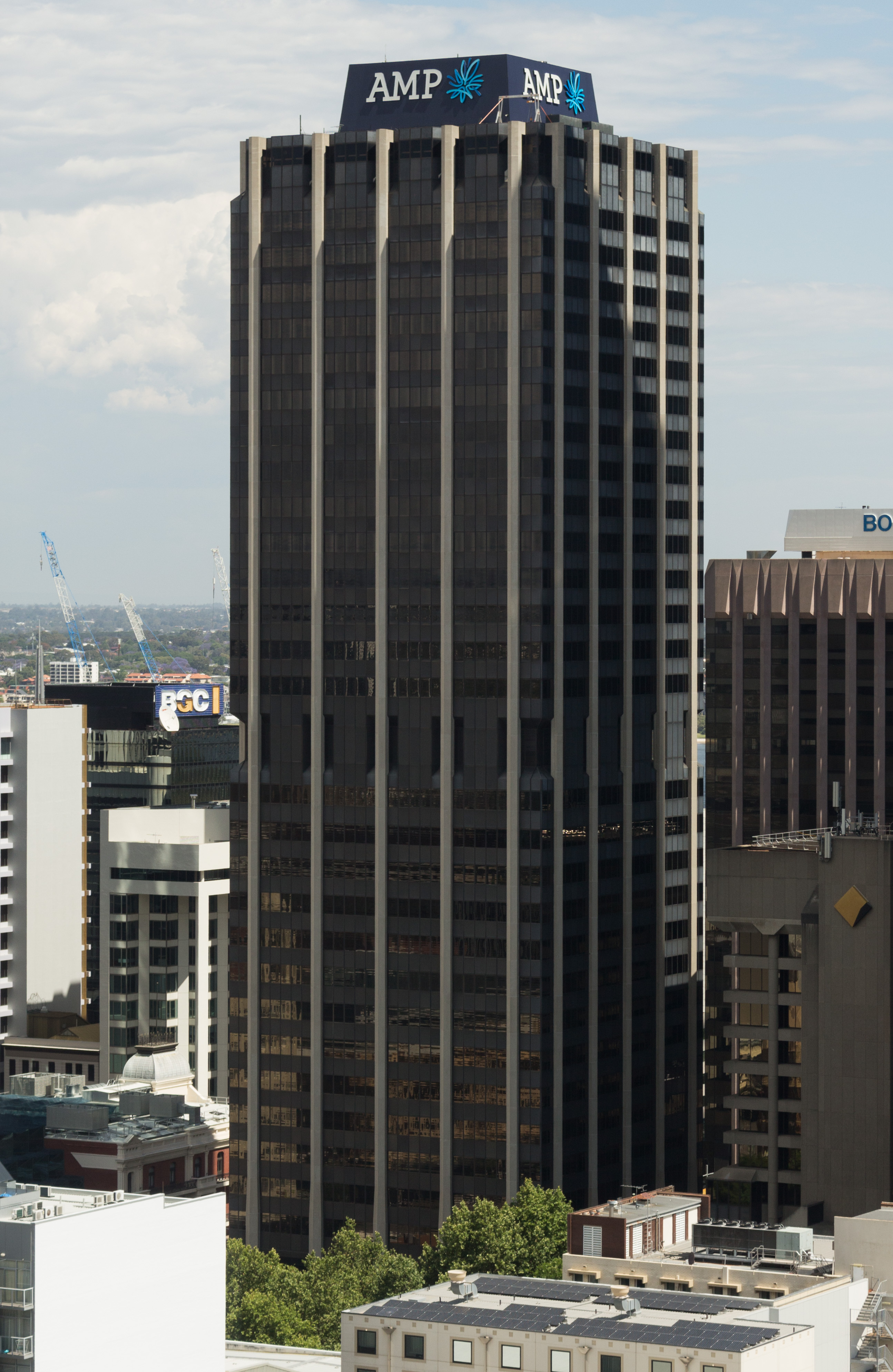
- Interactive map of the 140 St Georges Terrace area
- Former names: AMP Building

General information
- Type: Office tower
- Location: Corner of St Georges Terrace & William Street; Perth, Western Australia
- Coordinates: 31°57′15.16″S 115°51′22.72″E
- Construction started: 1972
- Completed: 1975
- Opening: 1975

Height
- Roof: 131 m (430 ft)

Technical details
- Floor count: 30
- Floor area: 29,800 m^{2} (321,000 sq ft) (lettable)
- Lifts/elevators: 14 (including freight)

Design and construction
- Architects: Forbes and Fitzhardinge

140 St Georges Terrace is a 30-storey skyscraper in Perth, Western Australia. Opened in 1975, the 131-metre (430 ft) tower was known as the AMP Building or AMP Tower after its former owner and flagship tenant, AMP Limited. The building became the tallest completed skyscraper in Perth in late 1974, a title which it held only until January 1975, when Allendale Square reached completion.

== Site history and construction ==
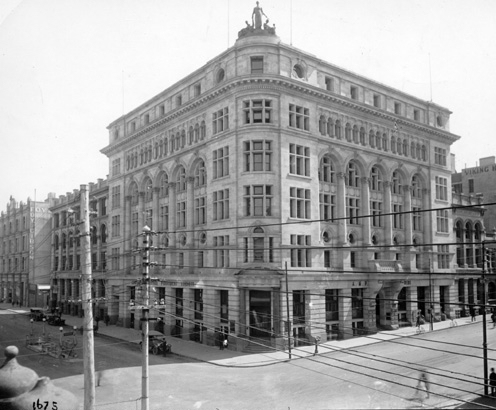
The old AMP Chambers at the corner of St Georges Terrace and William Street

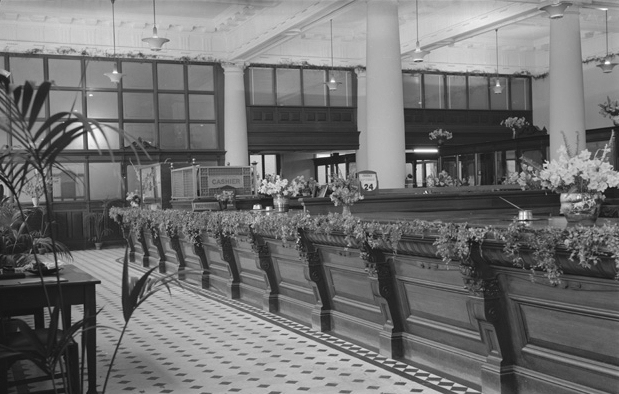
The interior of the old AMP Chambers in 1954

The site at the corner of St Georges Terrace and William Street known as Carr's Corner was purchased by AMP in 1910, and in 1915 the AMP Chambers designed by Oldham and Cox were built on the corner. This six-storey building was clad with sandstone, and the interior was decorated with jarrah.

The top of the building featured an iconic bronze statue, which became a landmark atop the chambers. The 3.7-metre (12 ft) high statue depicted four figures: a central figure symbolised protection, and it was flanked by a man, woman and child. Weighing around 910 kilograms (2,000 lb), the sculpture was hollow with a wooden base and was thought to have been made in Europe.

When AMP announced plans to demolish the building and erect in its place a modern skyscraper, the National Trust refused to classify the building as in need of protection. The Trust Administrator N.J. Armitage instead applauded the development and the open space that would be created in the forecourt of the new tower. Although the building could not be saved from demolition, the iconic statue atop it was saved by Clive Rutty and purchased by millionaire collector Lew Whiteman, who paid A$1,000, equivalent to A$11,600 in 2022, for it. When the statue was removed from the building on 19 March 1972, a piece of wood was found within it with the names on it of the four men who erected it in October 1914. AMP later asked to buy the statue back from Whiteman, and he told them they did not deserve it. After the death of Whiteman, the statue was bought at auction for A$60,800, equivalent to A$115,800 in 2022, by the land developers, Sherwood Overseas, and placed in its current position as a contribution to public art. It now stands on an island in Floreat Lake on the western side of Herdsman Lake.

The developers were allowed to build their tower beyond the allowable plot ratio because of planning concessions awarded in return for the provision of public amenities, namely the open space in front of the building and seats provided for the public. A further bonus was given for the linking of the development with the Elders development across St Georges Terrace. Demolition of the old building started in May 1972; construction on the foundations of the office tower then proceeded, and the construction of the tower was completed in 1974.

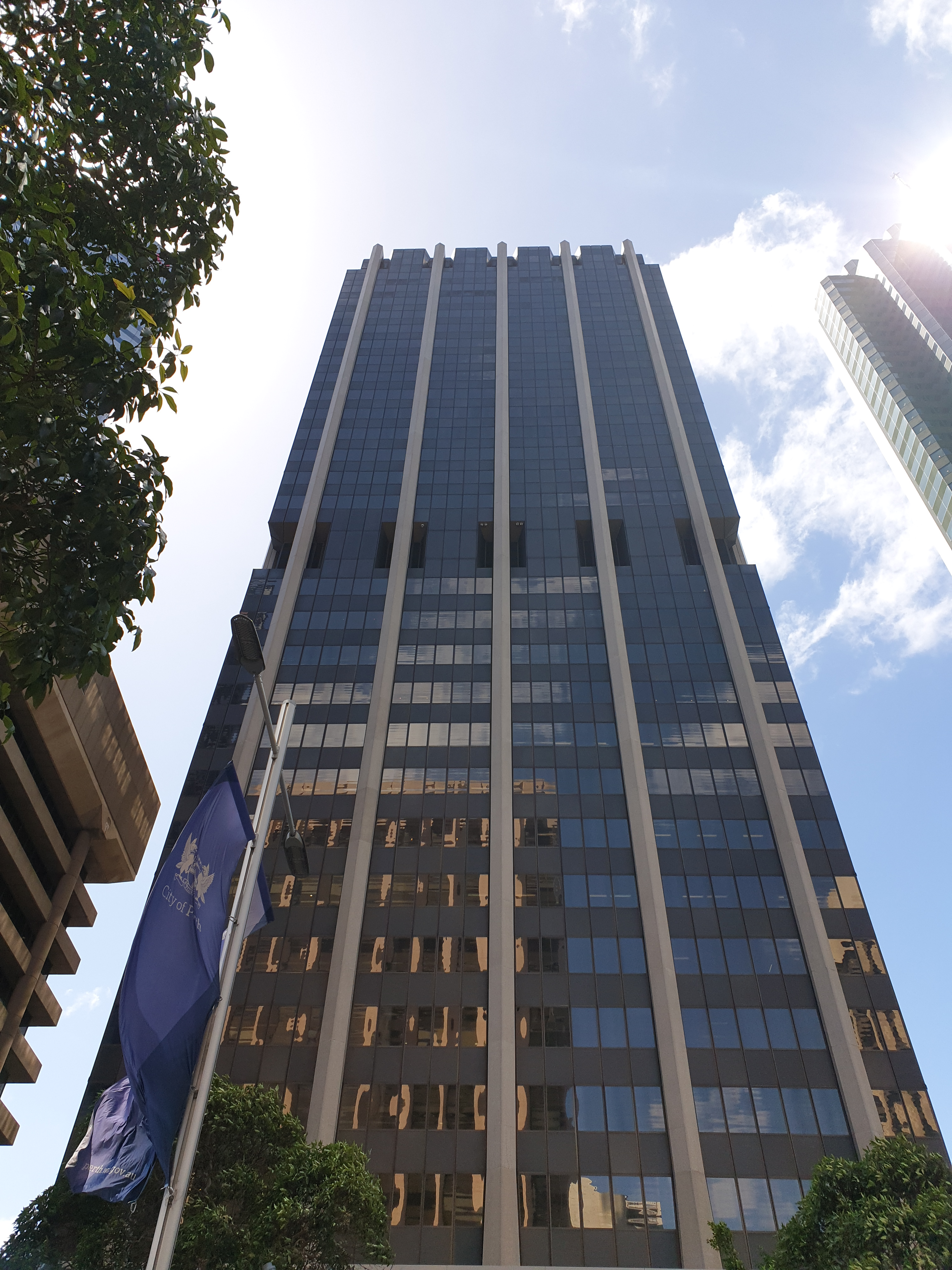
AMP Building taken from St George's Tce

The building originally housed an observation deck on the 29th floor, offering sweeping views across the central business district. However, when both its west and east views were blocked by the construction of the BankWest Tower in 1988 and Central Park in 1992, this observation deck was closed.

== Post-completion ==
When the tower was first built in 1974, an "iconic" commissioned sculpture by Howard Taylor was installed in its forecourt. The sculpture, entitled "The Black Stump", was constructed of concrete and mosaic tile and weighed more than 28 tonnes (62,000 lb). It was relocated to the University of Western Australia in 1990, where it has remained beside the Octagon Theatre ever since.

The building was used by AMP as its state headquarters from its opening in 1975 until 2002 when most of its staff moved to West Perth offices. The last AMP staff shifted out of the building in 2003. The AMP signage was removed from the tower's rooftop in April 2023. Zurich Financial Services acquired signage rights in July 2025 and the company's signage is planned to be installed in November 2025.

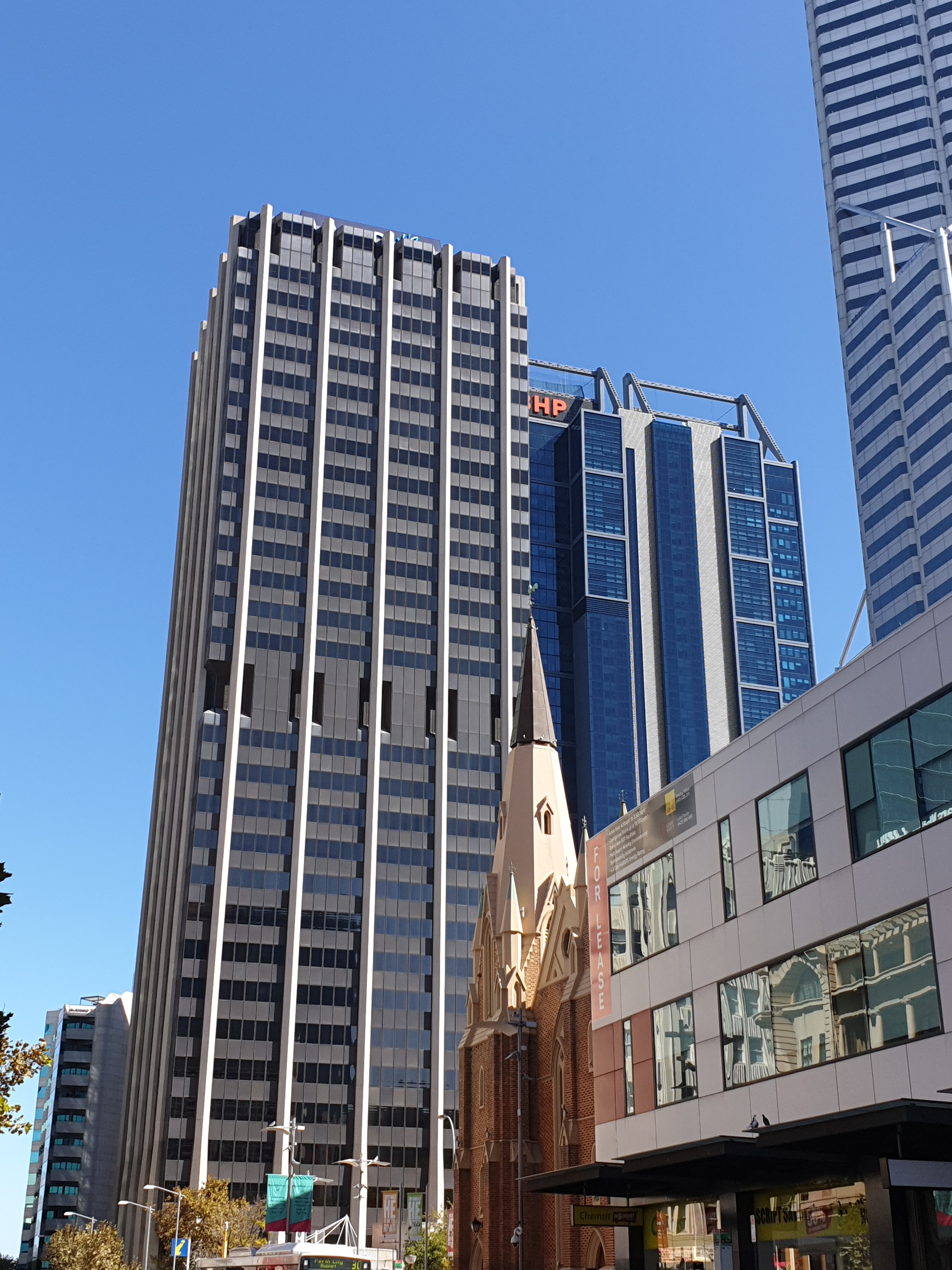
AMP Building taken from William Street

Since 1997, the tower has been used as a launching pad for some shells in the annual City of Perth Skyworks fireworks display.

Owned by AMP companies since 1915, the building was put on the market by owner AMP Asset Management in 2000 and was expected to fetch A$80 million. A Perth-based syndicate headed by Brett Wilkins offered to buy the tower for A$75–80 million. However, the property failed to sell, and remained within AMP ownership. In August 2005, the building was sold by AMP Life Statutory Fund No 1 to the AMP-managed Australian Core Property Portfolio for A$153.5 million. In April 2021, the tower was purchased by a joint venture between BlackRock Real Assets and Primewest for A$260 million.

=== Refurbishments ===
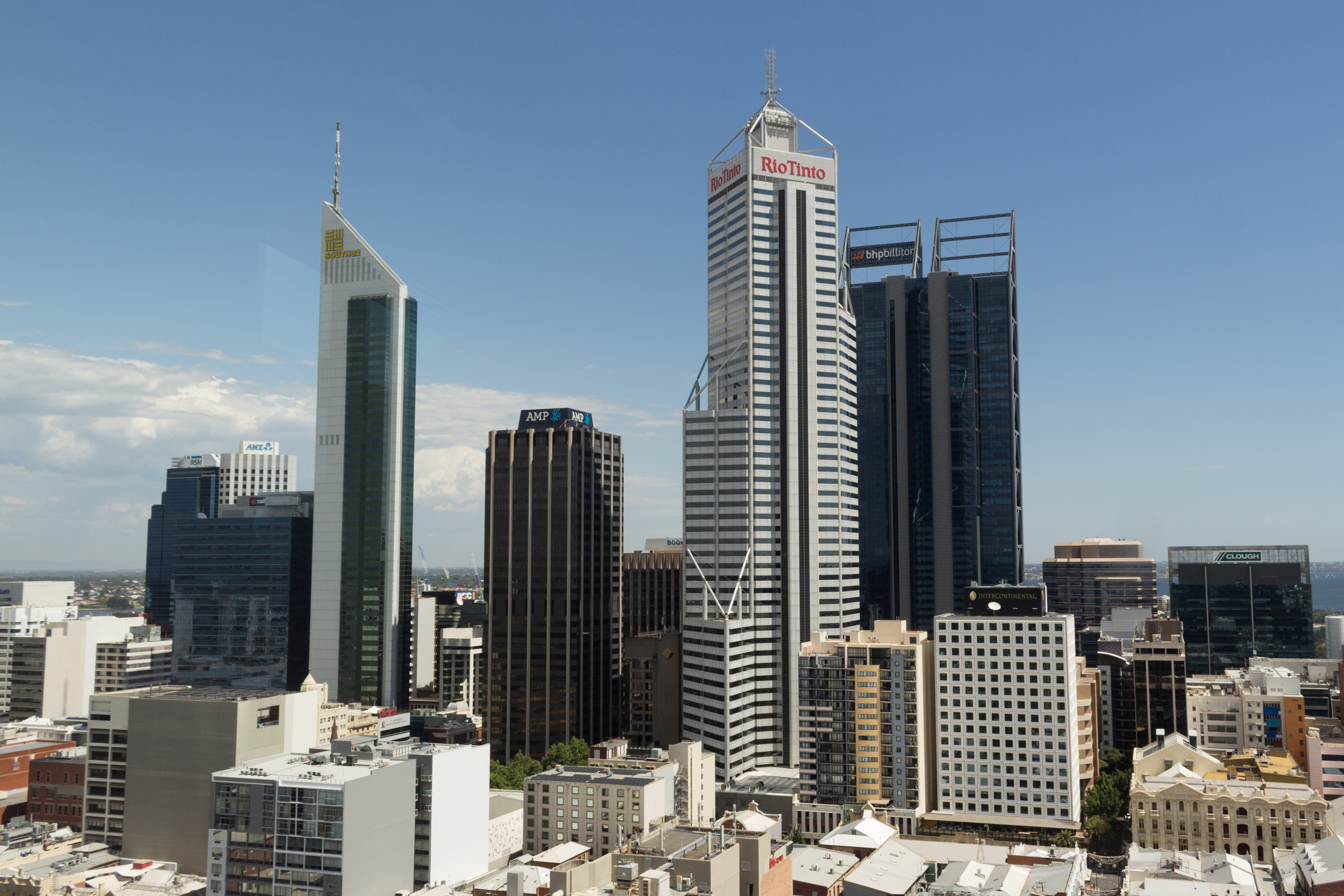
The tower seen in the centre of this photo, nestled between 108 St Georges Terrace and Central Park

In 1992, the building underwent refurbishment, but this was mostly only minor cosmetic refurbishment. Coinciding with the completion of Central Park, the A$15-million project was conducted by Multiplex. The refurbishment involved a facelift for the ground floor lobby, including polished granite flooring, wall panelling and coffered ceilings with concealed lighting, improved revolving doors, new glass and planter boxes. The facelift also saw the repaving of the building's forecourt with cobblestone, new landscaping, further public seating and the integration of the tower's underground car parking with Central Park's.

Despite the 1992 refurbishment, by 2000 the building was already widely regarded as in need of an upgrade. In 2003, when the building was "almost empty", an extensive refurbishment of the building was undertaken, at a cost of A$34 million. The largest office tower refurbishment in Perth's history, work started in April 2003. The refurbishment was mostly an internal one, refreshing office floors and replacing building services such as air conditioning and lifts. The bulk of the facade remained unchanged, aside from a new "two-storey high, 15-metre (49 ft) long bronzed-glass canopy" at ground level. The glass of the canopy is coated with small white dots which have a shading effect during the day, but uplighting produces a white ceiling effect at night. This canopy was intended to give the tower a more prominent entrance. The refurbishment also involved the installation of new conference facilities.

The 2003 refurbishment was designed by architects Cox Howlett & Bailey Woodland, and the refurbishment contract won by Multiplex. The project took until 2005, finishing on-time and on-budget. The refurbishment was a success, with the building going from "sparsely occupied" at the start of the refurbishment project to "practically full" in 2006. The refurbishment was also expected to give the tower a "4.5 Australian Building Greenhouse Rating" due to its new, energy-efficient lifts, air conditioning, window tinting and double glazing.

== Design ==
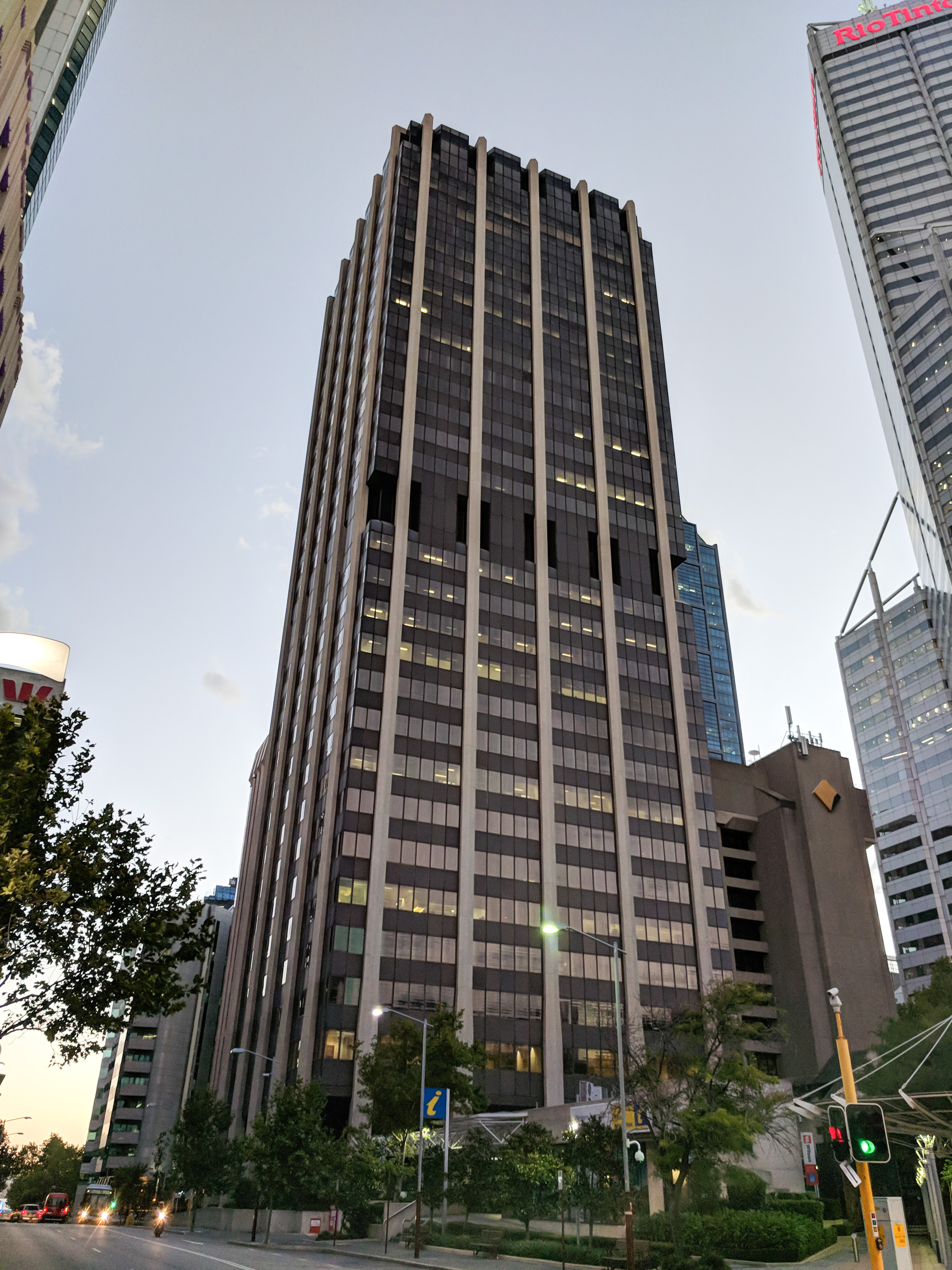
The tower seen from the corner of William Street and Hay Street

140 St Georges Terrace features a service core design, with the concrete core containing the lifts and two stairwells. The perimeter of the square cross-section tower features load-bearing columns, allowing the office floors to remain mostly column-free. The building has one service lift and twelve passenger lifts: six for the low-rise portion of the building (floors 1–14) and six for the high-rise (floors 15–28). The low-rise and high-rise portions of the building are clearly visible on the exterior of the building, as they are separated by a plant level.

The base of the tower is located 15 metres (49 ft) above sea level, and the roof of the building rises 131 metres (430 ft) above the street below. The building has 28 office levels, in addition to the ground floor, basement levels and plant room. According to Emporis, the 29th (top) floor was once an observation level which closed following the construction of the taller BankWest and Central Park towers around it. The floor-to-floor height in the tower is 3,660 mm (144 in), and the ceiling height is 2,740 mm (108 in). The building has 29,800 m^{2} (321,000 sq ft) of net lettable area, and has an underground car park with 260 spaces.
