= C Restaurant =

Restaurant in Perth, Western Australia

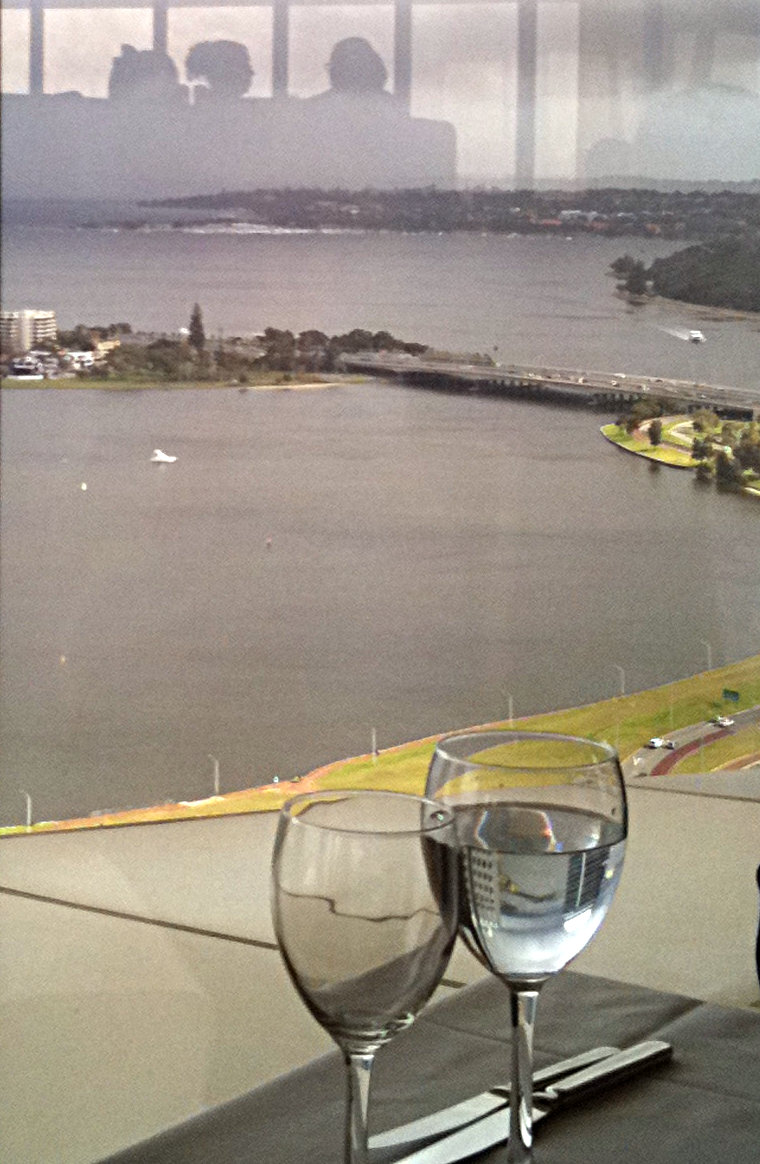
- View of the Swan River from the C Restaurant
- Interactive map of C Restaurant

Restaurant information
- Established: 26 January 2001
- Food type: Modern Australian
- Location: Level 33, 44 St Georges Terrace, Perth, Western Australia, 6000, Australia
- Coordinates: 31°57′18″S 115°51′34″E
- Reservations: Recommended
- Website: www.crestaurant.com.au

C Restaurant is a revolving restaurant located at Level 33 of St Martins Tower in Perth, Western Australia. The only revolving restaurant in Perth, it completes a full 360-degree rotation in 90 minutes, and offers views of the Swan River, the suburbs and the hills.

== History ==
C Restaurant is the second restaurant to be located at the top of St Martins Tower. The first, Hilite 33, was opened in 1978. Its staff included a young Shane Osborn, who was later the head chef at Pied à Terre in London. In 2000, Hilite 33's co-founder and then owner, Alain Kuhl, sold the business. The other co-founder of Hilite 33 was Jean-Daniel Ichallalene.

The new owner, Phil Clements, renamed the business, and relaunched it on Australia Day, 26 January 2001. Although Clements later claimed that C Restaurant offered "fun dining rather than fine dining", he also aimed to establish a national reputation. He revamped the menu, instituting a two course minimum order to deter casually dressed sightseers from ordering a coffee and lingering to admire the view. Within less than 12 months, C Restaurant had become "all the rage", and had won the Gold Plate award for fine and occasional dining. Soon afterwards, it was the place where, on 23 March 2002, England cricketer Ben Hollioake attended a dinner with his family before dying in a car accident on the way home.

In August 2006, Clements sold the business to restaurant manager Olivier Letrone, entrepreneur Franck Duroleck and waiter Jermone Guesdon.

In August 2026, it was announced that the restaurant would permanently close on 31 January 2027 due to the redevelopment of St Martins Tower as a hotel.

== See also ==
- Australian cuisine
- Greenhouse (restaurant)
- Print Hall
- Western Australian wine
