= Exchange Tower, Perth =

Skyscraper in Perth, Western Australia

Exchange Tower
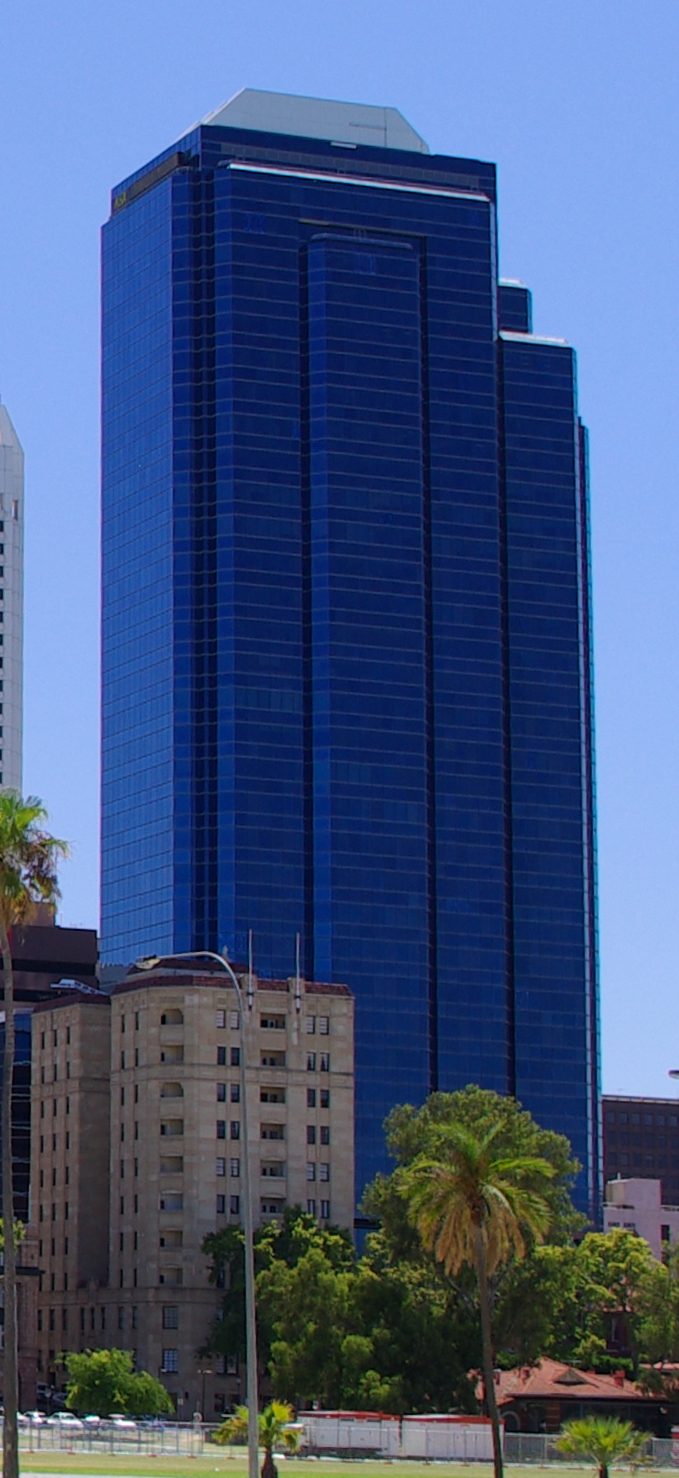
- Exchange Plaza in January 2008
- Interactive map of the Exchange Tower area
- Former names: Exchange Plaza

General information
- Status: Completed
- Type: Office tower
- Location: 2 The Esplanade, Perth, Western Australia
- Coordinates: 31°57′22.28″S 115°51′31.39″E
- Current tenants: Arup; Australian Government Solicitor; Etihad Airways; Fujitsu; Knight Frank; Mitsubishi; Morgan Stanley
- Opening: 1992
- Owner: Centuria

Height
- Roof: 146 m (479 ft)

Technical details
- Floor count: 40 (including basement and plant levels)
- Floor area: 34,479 m^{2} (371,130 sq ft)

Design and construction
- Architect: Peddle Thorp & Walker
- Structural engineer: Bruechle Gilchrist & Evans
- Main contractor: Multiplex

Exchange Tower, formerly Exchange Plaza, is a 40-storey skyscraper in Perth, Western Australia. Completed in 1992, the 146-metre (479 ft), it is the seventh tallest skyscraper in Perth.

== Site history and construction ==
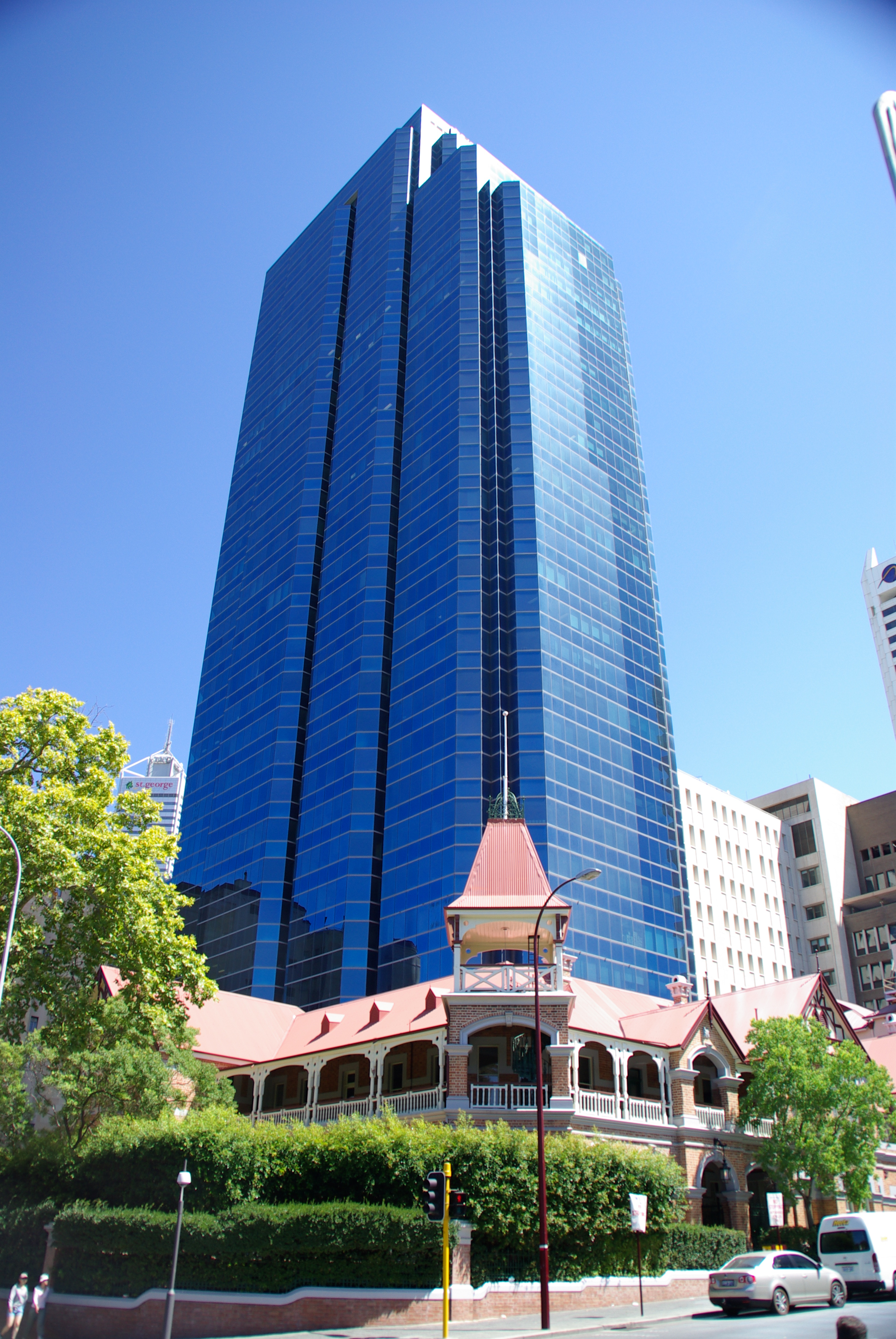
Exchange Tower with the Weld Club in the foreground in January 2008

The land on which the tower stands is owned by the historic Weld Club, a gentlemen's club located at the rear of the site, at the corner of Barrack Street and The Esplanade. The land was leased by the Weld Club to the tower's developers for 135 years.

The building was the result of a 50–50 joint venture between Australian Guarantee Corporation (AGC) and the Japanese C. Itoh and Shimizu. Construction on the building started during the 1980s property boom at a cost of between $220 million and $230 million. The tower was built by Multiplex, topping out occurred in mid-1991 and construction completed in 1992.

== Post-completion ==
Considered one of Perth's premium office towers, in July 2008 a portion of space halfway up Exchange Plaza was leased for $900 per square metre: the highest cost per square metre ever seen in Perth.

The roof of the building has been used as a base from which to launch shells in the annual City of Perth Skyworks fireworks display.

=== Ownership ===
In 1992, Westpac bought out the share in the development of C. Ito and Shimizu, and took over the AGC share in the property. Westpac put the tower's leasehold on the market in late 1996 at a hefty discount to its development cost. The leasehold was purchased in April 1997 by Schroders Property for $106 million. The acquisition was structured as a 50-50 joint venture between the Schroders Property Fund and the unlisted Schroders Private Property Syndicate. This was the largest CBD office purchase since AMP purchased 108 St Georges Terrace in 1994. Control of the building was obtained by AMP Asset Management when it took over the Schroders property portfolios in 1999.

In June 2003, Stockland bought a 50% share in the building. By 2006, the building was jointly owned by Stockland Trust Group and Colonial First State Property PPS Fund. In late 2011, AMP Asset Management purchased Stockland's stake.

In early 2018, Exchange Plaza was renamed Exchange Tower. In December 2018, AMP Capital Wholesale Office Fund and Primewest sold the Exchange Tower to the Primewest Counter Cyclical Trust It was included in the 2021 takeover of Primewest by Centuria.

== Design ==
Exchange Plaza was designed by architects Peddle Thorp & Walker. It is a steel-framed structure with pre-cast concrete floor panels. The exterior of the building is fully glazed with curtain walls, which step back at the upper levels. The unique blue glass was produced in a one-off batch by Pilkington.

The building features a 150-seat conference centre and uninterrupted river views from most levels all across Perth Water and west all the way to Rottnest Island.

The building has 34,479 square metres (371,130 sq ft) of net lettable area across 33 commercial office levels. In addition there are three plant floor levels and five basement parking levels, with 236 car parking spaces. Construction on the southern car park started in January 1998 and finished in May 2000, and involved the construction of the deepest wall that had ever been built in Perth. The complex also includes a 10-storey podium building fronting Sherwood Court.

As part of the development, dining, accommodation, tennis and bowls facilities were constructed for the Weld Club. The existing bowling green of the Weld Club had to be excavated for the construction of the car park, then replaced. In order to preserve as far as possible the historic character of the Weld Club site, the developers had to secure century-old bricks and tiles to integrate the base of the tower with the Club complex.
