= St Martins Tower =

Skyscraper in Perth, Western Australia

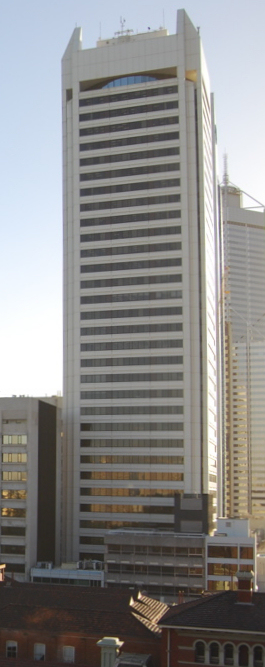
- Interactive map of the St Martins Tower area

General information
- Status: Completed
- Type: Office
- Location: Perth, Western Australia
- Coordinates: 31°57′18″S 115°51′33″E
- Construction started: 1974
- Completed: 1978

Height
- Antenna spire: 140 m (459.32 ft)
- Roof: 140 m (459.32 ft)

Technical details
- Floor count: 33

St Martins Tower is a 140-metre (460 ft) office building in Perth, Western Australia. It was the tallest building in the city from its completion in 1978 for almost 10 years, until it was overtaken in height by the BankWest Tower in 1988. The tower has a revolving restaurant called C Restaurant on level 33, the last floor with windows. This is the only revolving restaurant in Western Australia. For years it was informally known as the AAPT Tower, and later the Amcom building.
