= Palace Hotel, Perth =

Heritage-listed building in Perth, Western Australia

Palace Hotel
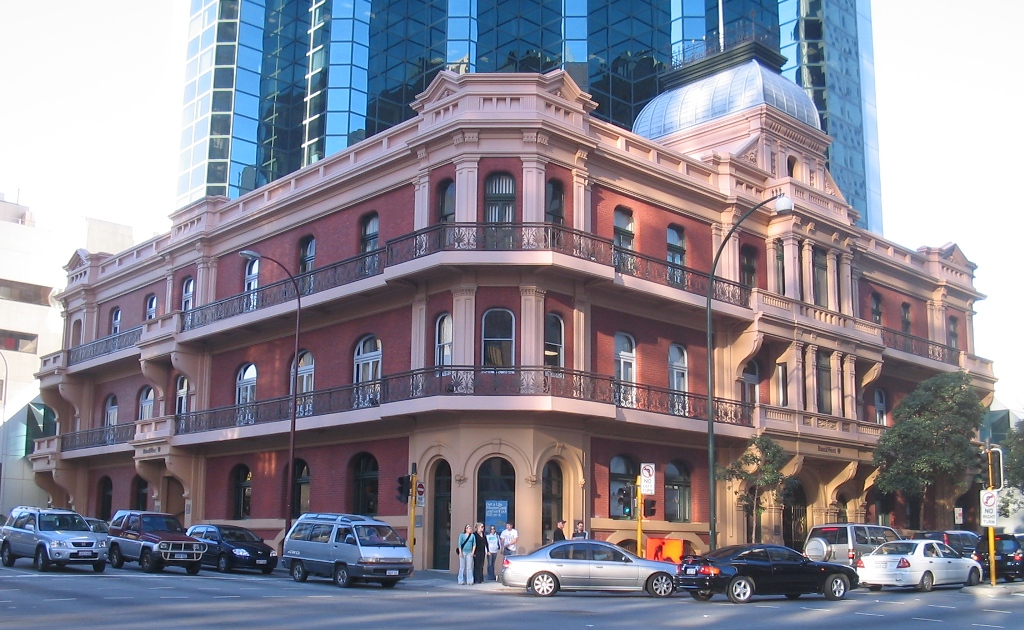

General information
- Status: Partially demolished
- Location: 108 St Georges Terrace; Perth, Western Australia
- Coordinates: 31°57′16.4″S 115°51′24.4″E
- Completed: 1897

Design and construction
- Architects: Ernest Saunders Porter; Edmond Neville Thomas

Western Australia Heritage Register
- Type: State Registered Place
- Designated: 12 May 2000
- Reference no.: 2114

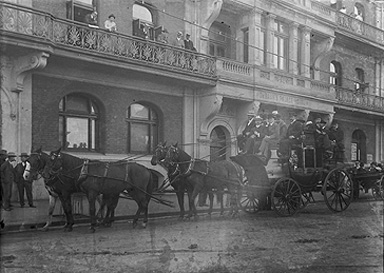
Passengers crowd a stagecoach in front of the hotel, c. 1905

The Palace Hotel in Perth, Western Australia, is a landmark three-storey heritage listed building located in the city's central business district. Originally built in 1897 as a hotel during the gold rush period of Western Australia's history, it was converted to banking chambers and offices in the 1980s and now accommodates the Perth headquarters of Woods Bagot, Adapptor and Hatchd. The building is located on the most prominent intersection in the financial district of the city, on the corner of St Georges Terrace and William Street.

When the hotel opened for business on 18 March 1897 it was, although slightly smaller than some of its contemporary buildings in other capital cities in Australasia, described as "one of the most beautiful and elegant hotels in Australasia". Other praise included: "redolent of the bourgeois luxury and splendour of the Paris of Napoleon III" and later "in its day, as sumptuous a hostelry as any in Melbourne or Sydney." It operated as licensed premises from 1897 until 1981.

== Style and heritage features ==
The building is described as being of a Federation Free Classical architectural style. It is three storeys high and of brick and iron construction. It was designed by architects Porter and Thomas and built by prominent mining entrepreneur and real-estate investor John De Baun at a cost of £64,000, equivalent to A$11 million in 2022.

In 1973, a public lobby group known as the Palace Guards was formed to push state planning authorities for the preservation of the building. Assisted by a Builders Labourers Federation green ban, the building was entered into the register of the National Trust of Australia in June 1973 and elevated to a permanent entry in 1980 "as a first-class example of the quality of building at the time of the gold rush".

In the period leading up to and during the 1980s redevelopment, lobbying from the Palace Guards, the National Trust of Western Australia and the public at large pushed for the retention of some elements of the original building. In 1990, legislation enforcing compliance with heritage preservation orders was enacted and the site became the subject of the first heritage agreement in the state. It was recorded as a permanent entry in the state heritage register at the Heritage Council of Western Australia in May 2000.

== Cultural significance ==
Due to its ornate style, its position within the city, and being the only building of its type and scale in St Georges Terrace, the hotel has been a landmark in Perth for all of its life. In its early years, the hotel afforded commercial travellers a level of opulence and comfort while visiting the city and offered a reminder of the wealth and prosperity of the state during the gold-boom period.

Prior to the construction of the Perth Town Hall in 1870, the site (which then housed the Freemasons' Hotel) was the pre-eminent social and political focus of the town – important decisions such as the establishment of a local police force in 1851 were made there. At the time of its transformation into banking chambers in the 1980s, considerable amounts of nostalgia and acclamation of its place in Perth were reflected in the local media.

== History ==
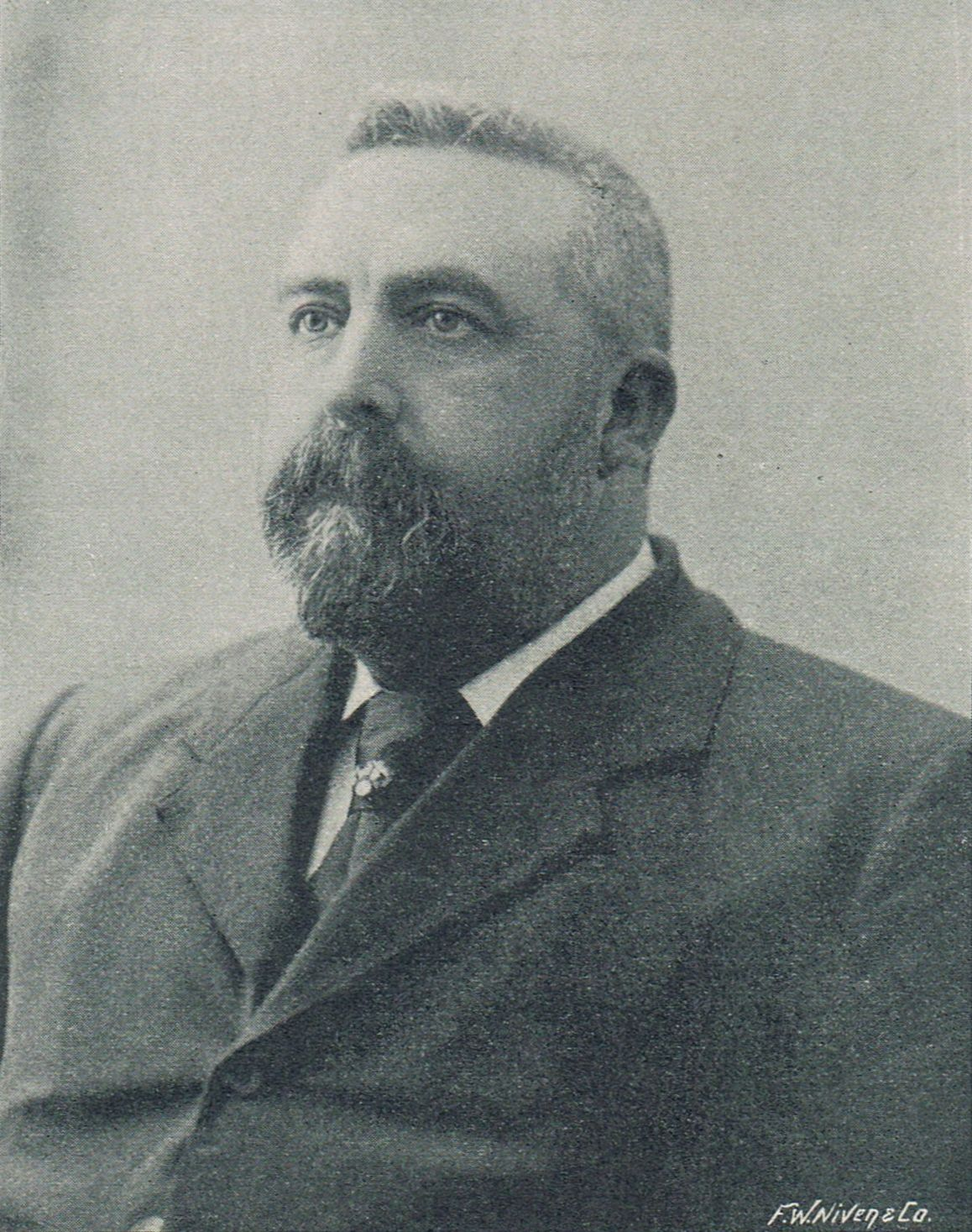
John De Baun, real estate developer and builder of the Palace Hotel

The site was first used as a lodging house when the King's Head Hotel operated there from at least 1830, owned and operated by William Dixon. In 1831 Dixon sold it to William Henry Leeder after which it was known as Leeder's Hotel, with it becoming a social centre for the town with many important dinners and celebrations conducted there. (Note: The William Street portal to 108 St Georges Terrace, which adjoins the Palace Hotel, is named the William Leeder Entrance in honour of the proprietor of the first hotel on the site.) The Perth Gazette wrote in August 1833:

few, if any, of [the employed classes] enjoyed a table such as the gentry made merry with at Leeder's Hotel on the occasion of the King’s birthday celebrations in August 1833, with nine types of meat and a choice of three desserts.

Leeder's Hotel was extended in 1845, by which time it was known as the Freemasons' Tavern and housed the first Masonic lodge in Western Australia. Following the death of Leeder in 1845, his wife transferred the management to Julian Carr, a merchant who would later become a prominent local politician and Chairman of the Perth City Council from 1861 until 1869. At this time it was known as the Freemasons' Hotel, with a number of other proprietors running it in the intervening years, including the wife of future Premier Walter James and George Towton, a prominent horseman and hotelier.

A fire at the rear of the hotel in 1888 destroyed a number of outbuildings, adding to the premises' general dilapidation. American real estate investor and former hotelier John De Baun purchased the property from Leeder's widow for £14,000 in 1894, equivalent to A$2.6 million in 2022, along with several other sites along St Georges Terrace. He engaged architects Ernest Saunders Porter and Edmond Neville Thomas to design the new Palace Hotel (Note: There were numerous Palace hotels in Australia in that period. In Western Australia alone they were to be found at Sandstone, Kalgoorlie, Peak Hill (Meekatharra), Wagin, Walkaway, Laverton, Southern Cross and York. Several still exist.) for the site with no expense to be spared and many of the construction materials imported. Marble for the fireplaces and mosaic floor tiles for the main entrance and bar-room floors came from Italy. It had "electric light and gas laid on in every room", as well as electric bells and speaking tubes "conveniently placed everywhere" and was reputed to have the first lift in Perth as well as 10 bathrooms serving the 50 bedrooms on the first floor. De Baun also commenced construction of the nearby Melbourne Hotel in 1895 in similar style, if not quite the same degree of opulence and grandiosity.

John Glowrey (a state member of parliament) leased the Palace Hotel from De Baun in 1901, and carried out the first of many additions and modifications to the building, including the addition of bedroom wings on the north and east wings. A newspaper advertisement dated 1903 described:

the hotel as the finest hotel in the State, with 130 bedrooms, a number of suites of private apartments, a writing room and library, fine dining hall, a grand vestibule, electric light and electric elevator and large sample rooms.

De Baun died in 1911 and ownership passed to the West Australian Trustee Executor and Agency Company Limited, although Glowrey's lease was maintained until his death in 1921. Charles Atkins (of Atkins Brothers Pty Ltd) purchased the property in 1924 for £A 48,000. A younger relative of the previous lessee, James Henry Glowrey, took over the lease in 1930 and major internal renovations costing £A 15,000 were undertaken at the same time, including enlarging the bar areas and conversion of the basement billiard room to a new bar area. External renovations were made in 1935 and 1939. In 1959 a major modernisation project commenced costing £A 160,000 and included installation of air conditioning, private bathrooms, and the replacement of timber verandas with cantilevered concrete verandas. Prior to this refurbishment, engraved lettering of the former name De Baun's Palace Hotel was displayed in the corbelling above the front entrance.

== 1980s redevelopment ==
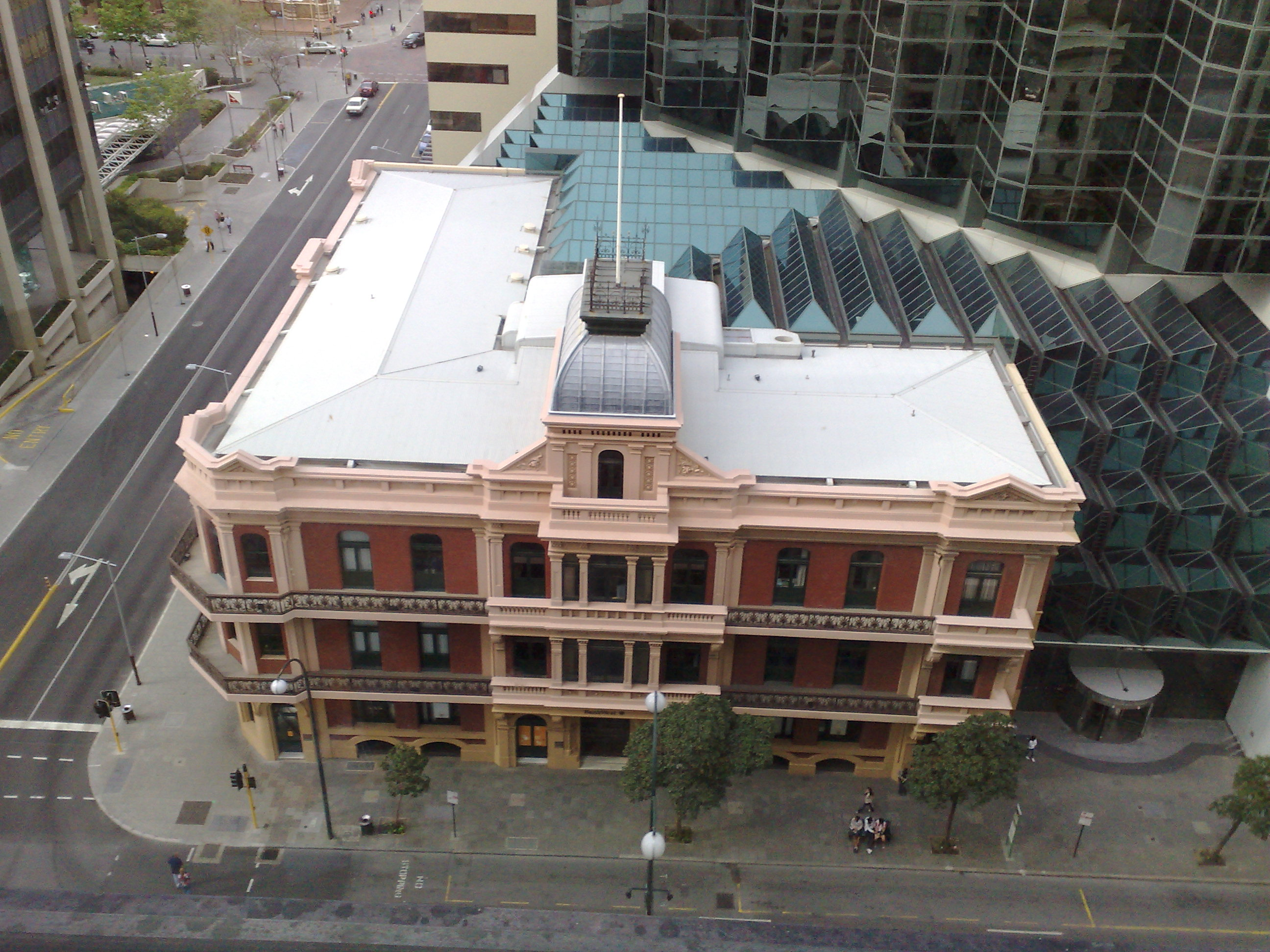
Palace Hotel from above showing the adjoining 108 St Georges Terrace

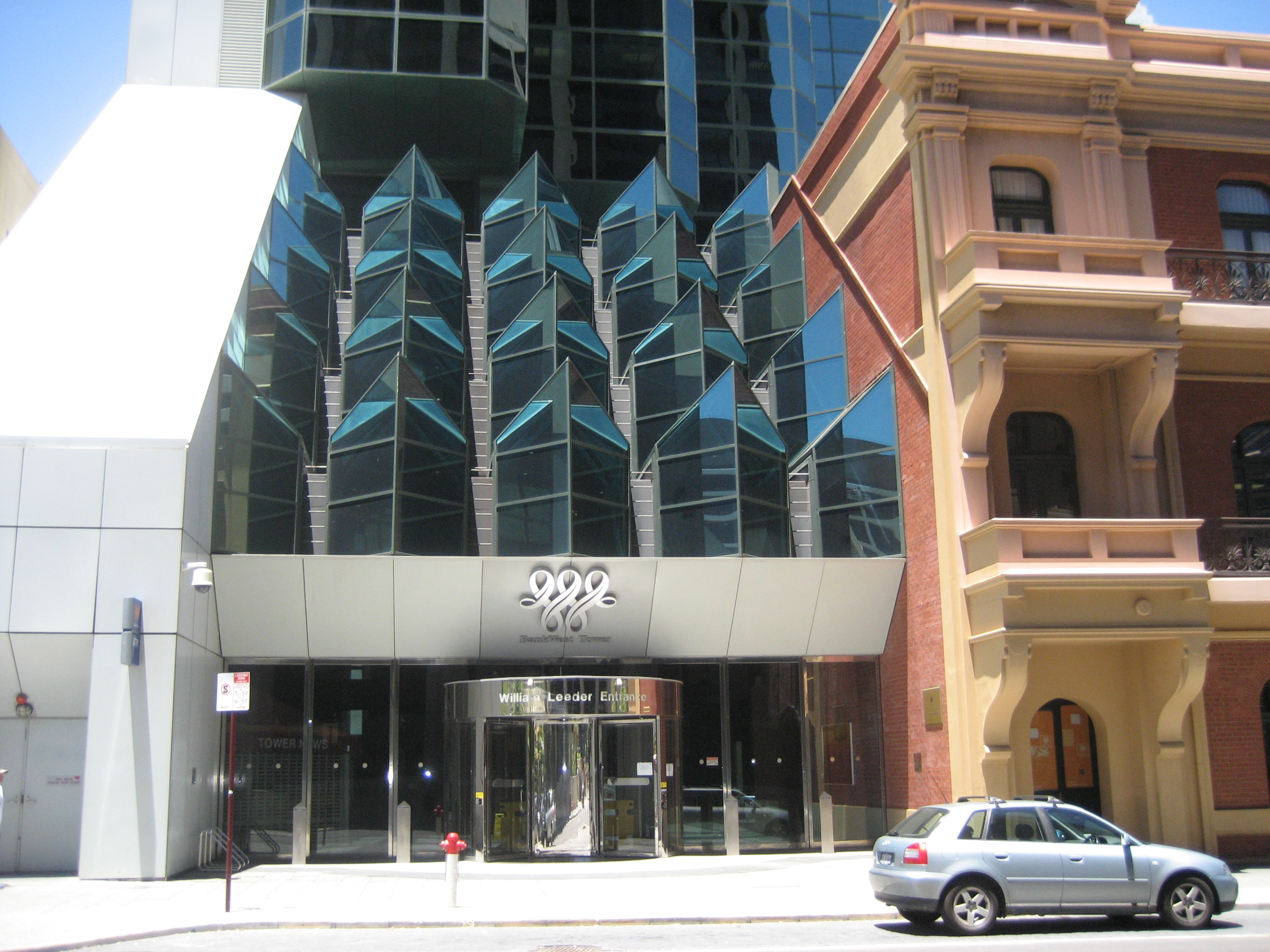
William Leeder Entrance to 108 St Georges Terrace off William Street, showing its connection to the Palace Hotel on the right

The Commonwealth Bank purchased the property sometime around 1972 with an announcement that it planned to redevelop the site as high-rise offices. Soon after, a public campaign developed, with a group known as the Palace Guards becoming a strong lobbying force, focussing on the state government and heritage organisations and pushing for the building's preservation. The group's inaugural meeting was held on 27 March 1973 at the Hotel.

J. M. Freeland, professor of architecture at the University of New South Wales wrote at the time:

this is a most important building for the history of Australian architecture, being an extreme example of High Victorian architecture. There were never many hotels of its standard in Australia and to my knowledge this is the last of them.

The campaign opposing the demolition culminated in a condemnation of the plan from the National Estates Committee and an appeal from the bank for the Australian Government to acquire the property. Bond Corporation ultimately purchased the property and the adjacent Terrace Arcade in 1978 and in 1980 unveiled plans (which had been pre-approved by the Perth City Council) for a modern office block and the demolition of parts of the existing building and adjoining properties. The developers had successfully sought modification of the original planning approval by the council to allow the use of the Palace Hotel as a bank, rather than remaining as a public hotel. The development plans were summarised in the Trust News, the journal of the National Trust of Australia as:

the erection of a multi-storied, multi-use tower block on the North East corner of the site; retention of the Palace Hotel structure on the South West corner; development of a covered concourse between the two structures linking William Street with St George’s Terrace. This will require: demolition of the structure housing the Terrace Arcade; demolition of the eastern accommodation wing of the hotel; dismantling and reconstruction of the northernmost portion of the William Street façade; [and] dismantling and reconstruction of the dining-room.

The tower project and restoration of the hotel were carried out as a joint venture between Bond Corporation and the R&I Bank, with the first demolition tasks commencing in August 1981. The hotel closed in June 1986 amid demolition works and construction – by August 1983 construction had completed on the tower's foundation and three levels of underground parking. The project was completed in 1988 and officially opened in August 1989 by premier Peter Dowding.

The redevelopment entailed demolition of much of the interior wallspaces of the old hotel, however, the exterior façades facing the two main streets are largely intact, if slightly shortened on the William Street frontage. A glass covered atrium joins the tower on the former hotel so that the tower entrances double as undercover access to the building.
