= John De Baun =

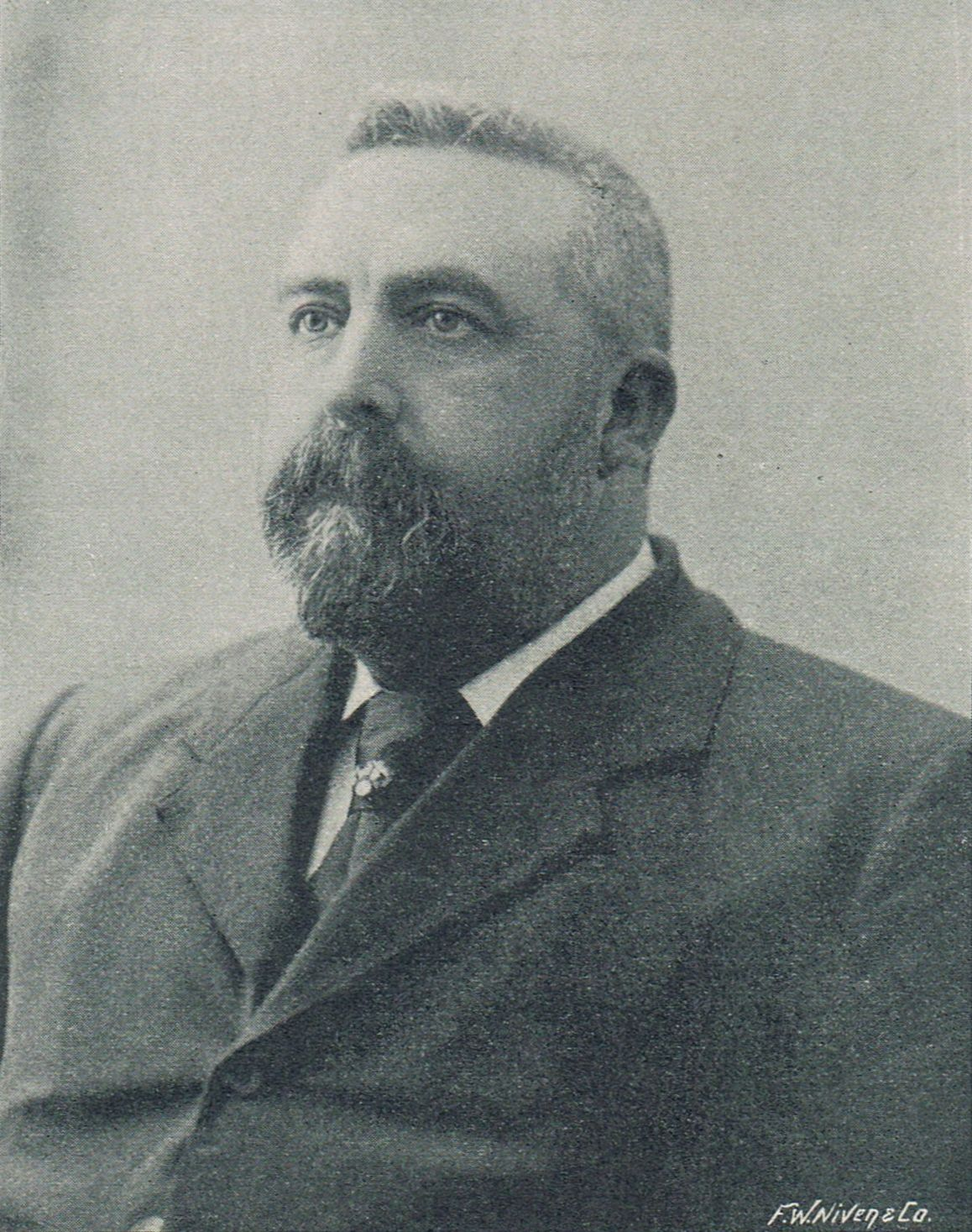
- Born: 19 January 1852; New Jersey, USA
- Died: 24 December 1911 (aged 59); Perth, Western Australia
- Occupations: Real estate developer, hotelier, mining investor
- Spouse: Ada Williams
- Relatives: Samuel (brother), William (brother), Albert H. (brother)

John De Baun (1852–1912) was an American-born Australian real estate developer, hotelier and mining investor.

== Biography ==
=== Early life ===
John de Baun was born on 19 January 1852 in New Jersey. He emigrated to Australia, arriving in Melbourne in the 1880s.

=== Career ===
He lived and worked in Balranald for six weeks and then moved to Wilcannia, where he worked as a contractor. In 1884 he established the first hotel in Silverton, The Silverton Hotel. De Baun also served as an alderman on the Silverton Council. In the wake of the gold rush in Broken Hill, he built another successful hotel, The Grand Hotel, in 1888. He also started investing in the Adelaide Stock Exchange and was worth £100,000 at one point, a large sum of money at the time. He also invested in property in Broken Hill and Adelaide. However, in 1892, he lost his fortune due to an economic downturn in the economy of Eastern Australia, and was only worth £5,000.

Taking a chance on the gold rush in Coolgardie, Western Australia, he established four businesses in that town and became wealthy again, re-investing his resources in the stock market. He then built the Great Western Hotel in Coolgardie (now demolished).

In 1894 he purchased the Freemason's Hotel, on the corner of St Georges Terrace and William Street, Perth. He then built a new three-storey hotel, the Palace Hotel, designed by architects Porter and Thomas (formerly of Broken Hill), on the site. The Palace Hotel was called "one of the most beautiful and elegant hotels in Australasia" by author Warren Bert Kimberly.

In 1896, he purchased the Retreat Inn on the corner of Hay and Milligan Streets, in Perth, and demolished it. On the site he built a new two-storey hotel, The Melbourne Hotel, designed by architect Peter John Wilson. He also owned many properties in Perth, including most of St Georges Terrace, and mining interests in the Goldfields. Additionally, he owned prospecting rights in Cue.

In 1902 De Baun leased the Palace Hotel to John Glowrey, a member of parliament, which allowed him to pursue interests in the Western Australian pearling industry. In December 1908 De Baun lost six ships (one schooner and five luggers) when a cyclone hit the Broome area.

=== Personal life ===
On 13 September 1899 De Baun married Ada Williams at St George's Cathedral, with the reception held at the Palace Hotel.

=== Death ===
De Baun died on 24 December 1911 in Perth, following a blood infection in his leg, which was complicated by his diabetes.

== Legacy ==
- John De Baun Street in Cable Beach, Western Australia is named in recognition of his contribution to the pearling industry.
- The Melbourne Hotel [33 Milligan St Perth] named the original 1897 pub De Baun & Co in honour of John De Baun
- The St Georges Terrace portal into 108 St Georges Terrace (formerly the Bankwest Tower), which adjoins the Palace Hotel building, is named the John De Baun Entrance.
