= Palace Tower =

Palace Tower may refer to:

- Palace Tower, a hotel building part of the Caesars Palace casino in Las Vegas, United States
- 108 St Georges Terrace, a skyscraper in Perth, Australia
