= Peter John Wilson =

Australian architect (1869–1918)

- Born: 4 May 1869; Melbourne, Victoria, Australia
- Died: 21 February 1918 (aged 48); Drummoyne, New South Wales, Australia
- Occupations: Architect, farmer
- Spouse: Sarah Owston
- Children: 4
- Parents: Peter John Wilson; Elizabeth Jane (née McGuire)

Peter John Wilson (1869–1918) was an Australian architect, known for a number of buildings in Western Australia (most notably the Melbourne Hotel).

== Biography ==
=== Early life ===
Peter John Wilson was born on 4 May 1869 in Melbourne, the second son of Peter John Wilson (1840-1911), a lawyer, and Elizabeth Jane (née McGuire). He had four siblings. They grew up at Boa Vista, a family residence in Kensington, a suburb of Melbourne. His mother died in June 1878, when he was nine years old. After his father remarried, to a woman named Mary, he had two additional half-siblings. They lived at Royal Park Villa in Melbourne. The family was hurt by the economic recession of the 1890s.

=== Career ===
He served as an apprentice for other architects, including William Pitt (1855–1918), when he was designing the Princess Theatre in Melbourne. He then became an Associate of the Royal Victorian Institute of Architects in June 1892. To escape the eastern economic recession, he moved to Western Australia, settling down in Fremantle. In 1892, he advised the architectural team on the addition of the proscenium to the Fremantle Town Hall.

He designed a shop on Packenham Street in Fremantle for Cruickshank & Co. in 1894 and a cottage and shop in Rockingham for Mr J. Bell in 1895. That same year, in 1895, he also designed two-storey shops on High Street, Fremantle opposite the Town Hall as well as private residences in Beaconsfield, Fremantle and Cottesloe. Additionally, he designed the brewery and cellars for the Fremantle Brewing Company and cottages on Gordon Street in Perth.

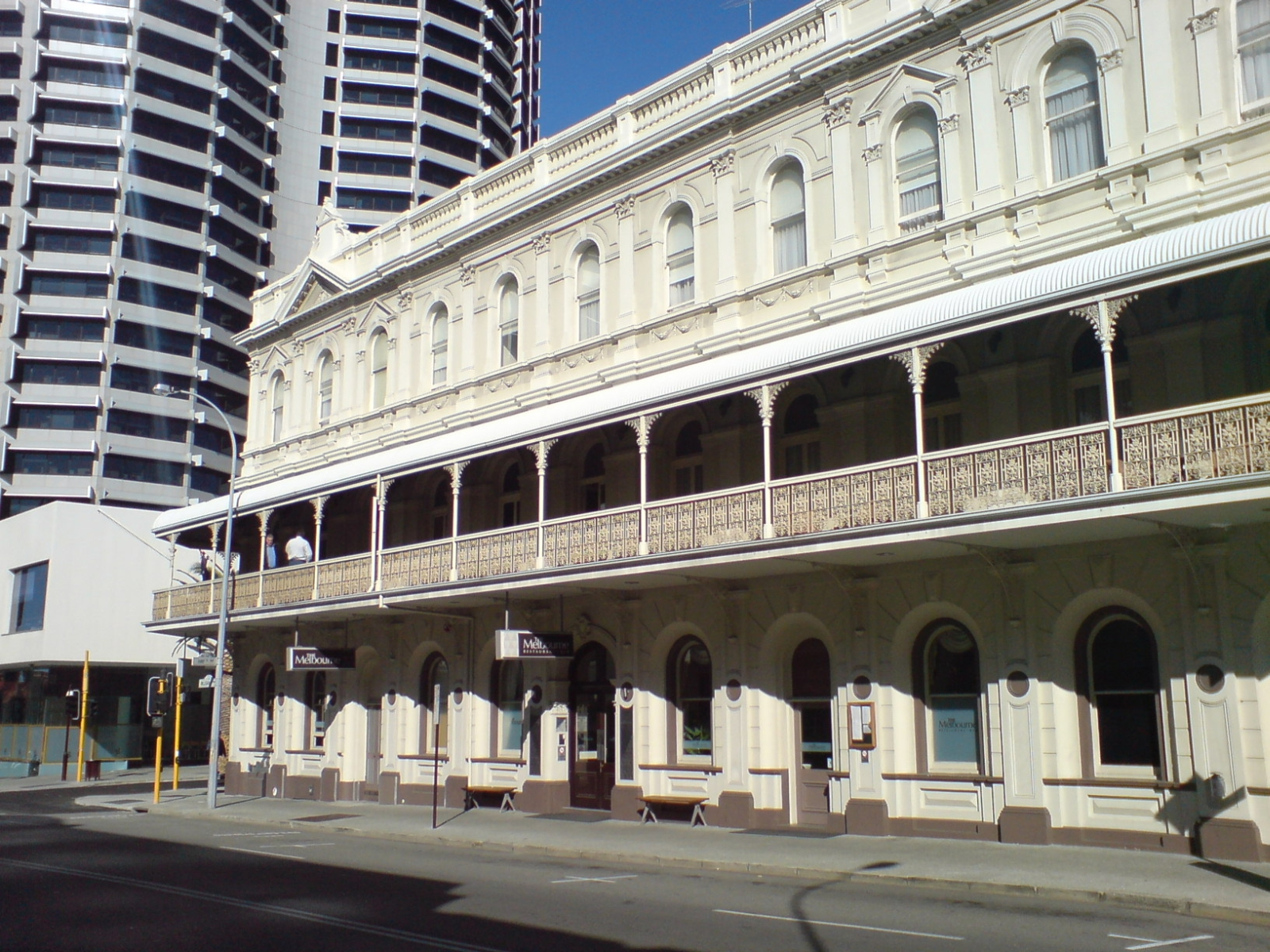
The Melbourne Hotel in Perth

In 1896, he was commissioned by investor John De Baun (1852-1912) to design the Melbourne Hotel on the corner of Hay Street and Melbourne Street (now known as Milligan Street), in Perth. He also designed the former grandstand of the West Australian Cricket Association. A year later, in 1897, he designed a shop and offices on the corner of corner Market and Bannister streets in Fremantle for Holmes Bros & Co.

In the early 1900s, he became a farmer in Cannington, Western Australia and was appointed a member of the Canning Drainage Board, as well as joining the Canning Agricultural and Horticultural Society.

Wilson died in Drummoyne, an inner western suburb of Sydney on 21 February 1918.

=== Personal life ===
He married Sarah Owston, the daughter of Benjamin Mason and widow of William Owston, in 1893 in Fremantle. They had four children: Peter John (Jack) in 1894, Esther Enid in 1895, Doris Day in 1897, and Frederick Gladstone in 1899. Both his sons died in action during World War I. He later moved to New South Wales, where he died in February 1918.
