= Central Park (skyscraper) =

Skyscraper in Perth, Western Australia

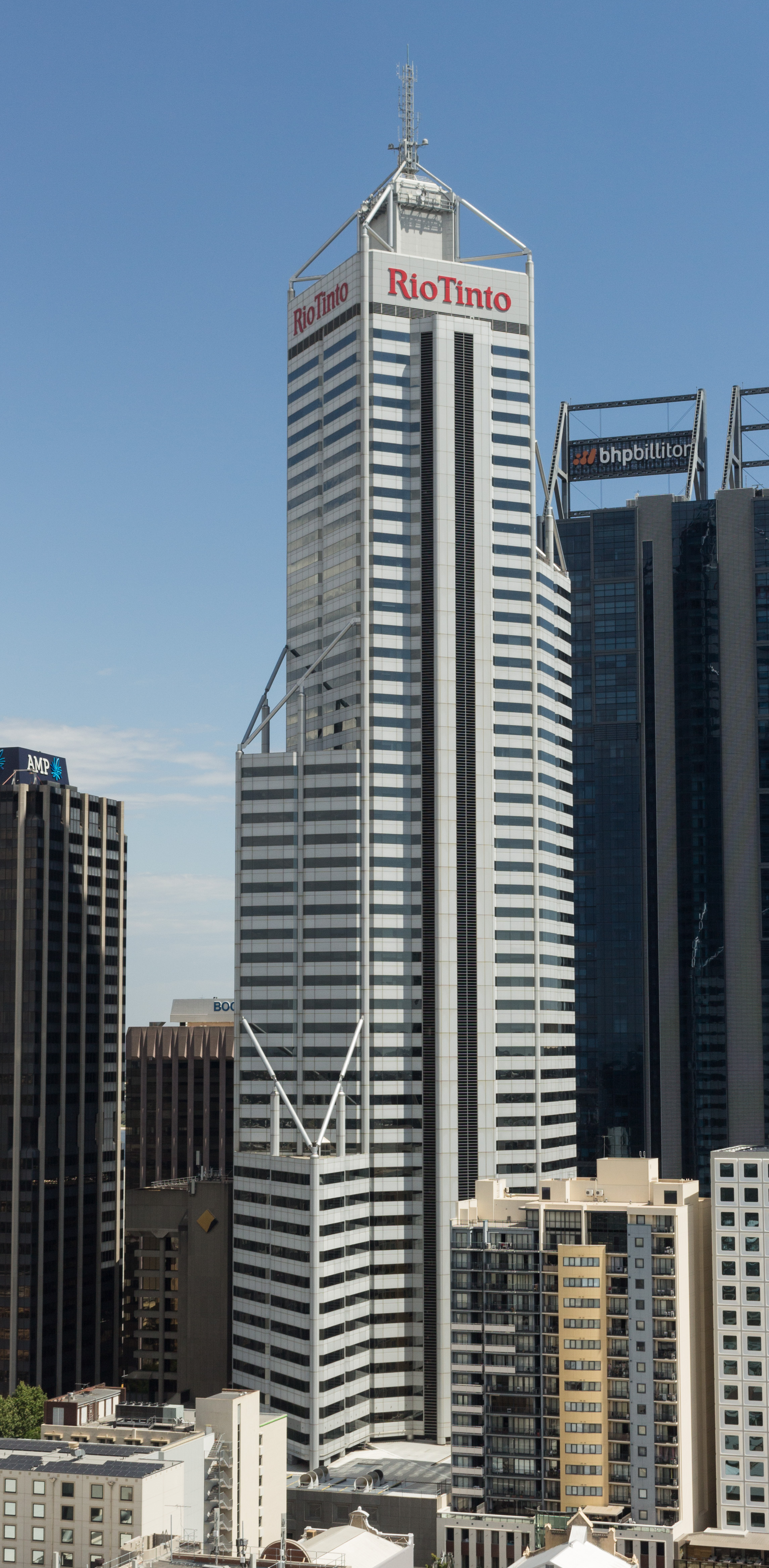
- Central Park tower in 2017

General information
- Type: Office tower
- Location: 152–158 St Georges Terrace, Perth, Western Australia
- Coordinates: 31°57′13.2″S 115°51′20.2″E
- Construction started: 1988
- Completed: 1992
- Opening: 1992
- Cost: A$186.5M
- Owner: Fraser Group (50%); Perron Group (50%)

Height
- Antenna spire: 261.7 m (858.6 ft)
- Roof: 226 m (741.5 ft)
- Top floor: 205 m (672.6 ft)

Technical details
- Floor count: 51 (occupied)
- Floor area: 66,500 m^{2} (716,000 sq ft)
- Lifts/elevators: 18

Design and construction
- Architects: Forbes & Fitzhardinge
- Structural engineer: Bruechle Gilchrist & Evans
- Main contractor: Multiplex

Website
- centralparktower.com.au

Central Park is a 51-storey office tower in Perth, Western Australia. The building measures 226 m (741 ft) from its base at St Georges Terrace to the roof, and 261.7 m (859 ft) to the tip of its communications mast. Upon its completion in 1992, the tower became the tallest building in Perth, and was the fourth-tallest in Australia from then until 2005. It is also currently the sixteenth tallest building in Australia (tied with the Infinity Tower) and the tallest building in the western half of Australia.

The approval of the tower was controversial due to the plot ratio concessions made by the Perth City Council to the developers. These concessions enabled the developers to construct a tower more than twice the height which would otherwise be allowable on the site. There was also opposition to the Council's decision to ignore its own town planning experts in allowing a large car park to be constructed underneath the site.

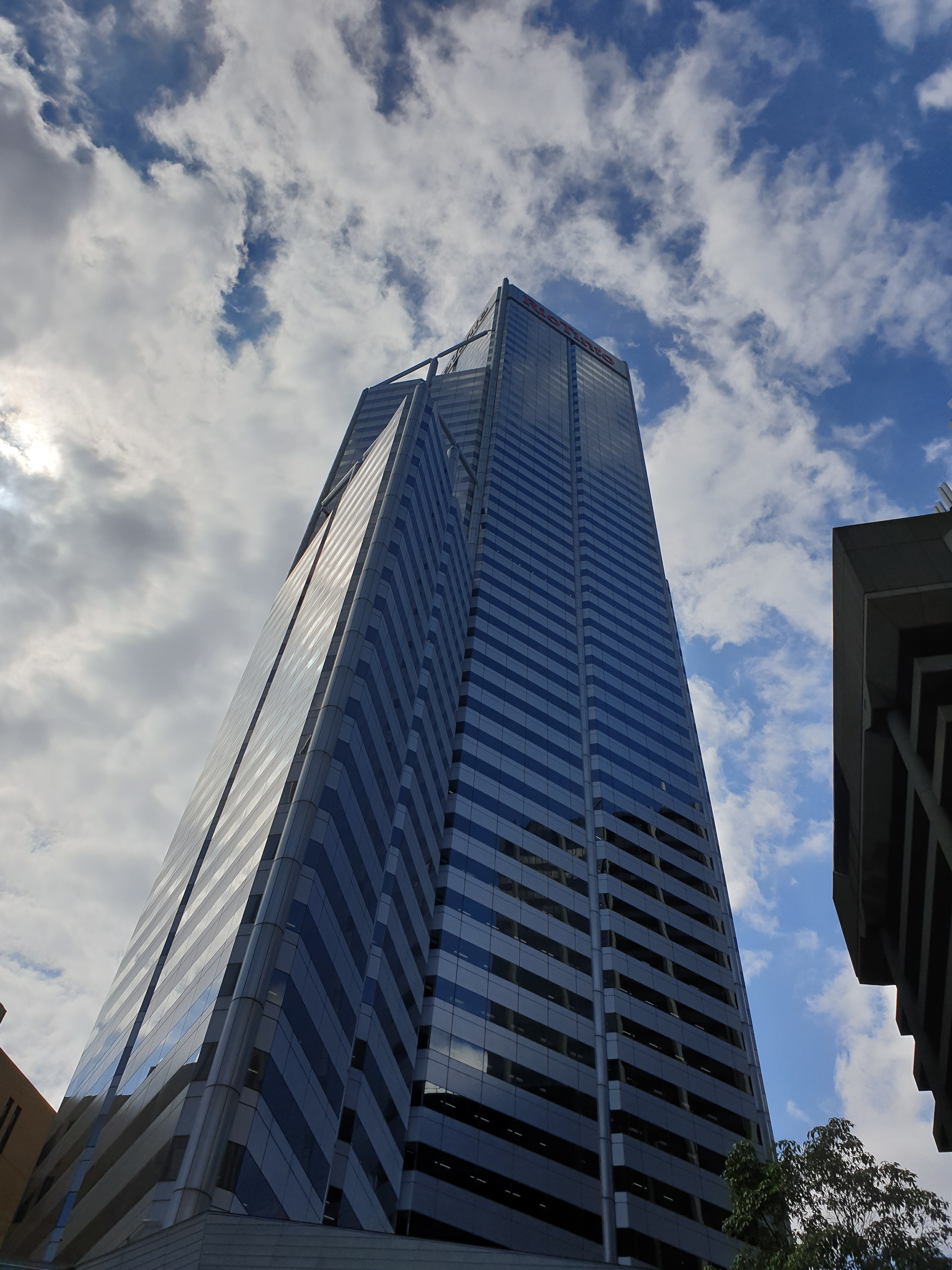
Central Park Tower Taken from St Georges Terrace

The building is formed by a composite steel and concrete frame, with various setbacks in its profile, meaning the upper floors are much smaller in area than lower levels. Outrigger trusses at the top of the building and at the various setbacks help to stiffen the building's reinforced concrete core against the strong winds prevalent in the area. The base of the building features a small park, for which the tower is named.

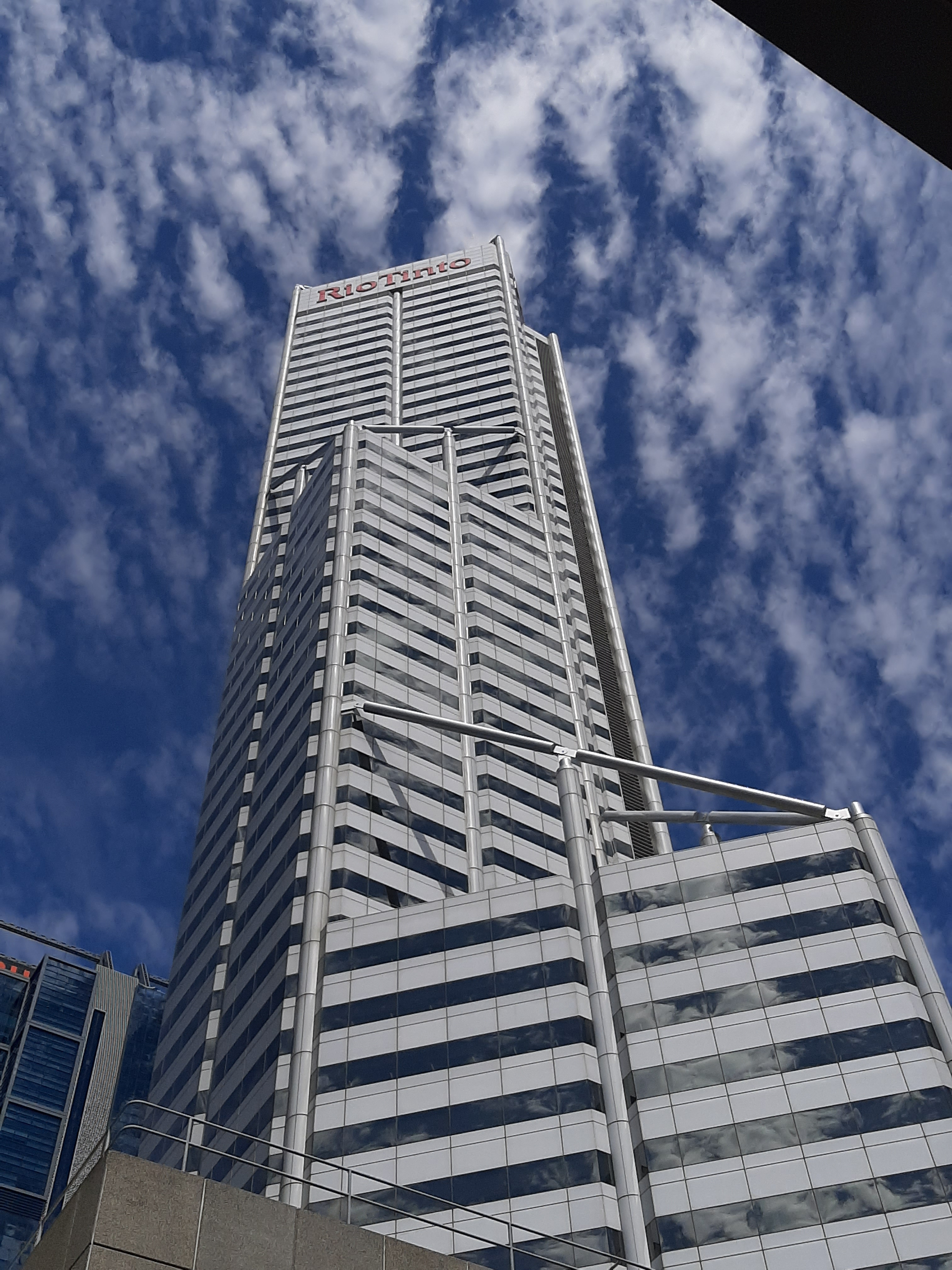

== History ==
=== Department stores ===
From as early as the 1930s, the site was home to a Foy & Gibson department store. The store extended all the way through from St Georges Terrace to Hay Street, featured a popular cafeteria and "had great areas of window display with island windows beyond the street frontage".

The store changed to a David Jones department store upon it purchasing Foy & Gibson. By the late 1970s, David Jones had withdrawn from the Western Australian market, and the site stood vacant after decades as a landmark of St Georges Terrace. The site was later acquired by Central Park Developments, a joint venture of the Superannuation Board of Western Australia, Bond Corporation and L. R. Connell and Partners, and in 1986 had a value of $20 million.

=== Planning approval ===
A planned $150 million redevelopment of the 1.5-hectare (3.7-acre) site was announced in October 1985. The plans included a 45-storey office tower, underground car parking, a landscaped park and the extension of the Hay Street Mall westwards to alongside the development. Demolition of the site had started by October 1986, by which time the planned tower had been expanded slightly to 47 floors.

The 1987 approval of the redevelopment by the Perth City Council was controversial. The council's own Town Planning Scheme imposed a limit on the number of parking bays in the central business district to ensure that the city streets could handle increased traffic levels coming from extra parking. Under the scheme the site was only entitled to 300 car-parking bays. The developers sought approval for 1,175 car-parking bays, which Council planning experts had said would cause traffic to back up to King Street waiting for entry. The council wanted the developers to consider constructing a road tunnel from Mounts Bay Road to the underground parking to reduce traffic congestion around the tower, however the developers only agreed to consider building a pedestrian underpass beneath St Georges Terrace.

The final planning approval for the redevelopment was ultimately passed by the council in an 18–9 decision on 19 October 1987, after a discussion of over two hours. The council made various planning concessions to allow the development to have 1,175 car-parking bays and exceed the allowable plot ratio. The council allowed the developers to transfer 15 storeys worth of plot ratio from the landscaped park at the corner of William and Hay streets, and gave bonuses of 10 storeys for actually building the park and 4 storeys for the public space and the quality of the development. As a result, more than half of the tower's eventual 51 floors came from these planning concessions. Councillors Peter Gallagher, Les Johnston and Michael Hale argued that the approval of the redevelopment set a "dangerous precedent", and the State's Planning Minister Bob Pearce said that the building was "too big" and that the Council should not have granted the extra parking bays to the developers. At the time of the planning approval, the site was owned by AMP, the Reserve Bank of Australia and Central Park Developments (the Bond-Connell corporation). The State Government approved the plans in November 1987 and the construction contract was awarded to Multiplex.

=== Construction: 1988 to 1992 ===
Construction on the tower started in 1988, with South Perth firm Bruechle Gilchrist & Evans as the project engineers. The building was constructed in a modular method, whereby floor slabs were pre-cast off-site and simply dropped into the steel frame of the tower as construction progressed. Over 60,000 m^{2} (650,000 sq ft) of pre-cast floor units, both rectangular and triangular, were supplied for use in Central Park, the largest such contract ever awarded to an Australian company. The modular construction principle even extended to the restrooms of the tower: they arrived on the building site as completely enclosed modules, ready to be fixed into position on each floor and have external services connected.

Major structural work on Central Park concluded with the installation in 1992 of its communications mast. The first tenants, accounting firm BDO Nelson Parkhill, moved into their offices in May 1992, followed by further tenants including Ernst & Young in December 1992. Following structural completion of the tower, the public park was landscaped in early 1993.

Construction of Central Park cost $186.5 million, and upon completion the building overtook 108 St Georges Terrace as the tallest skyscraper in Perth. It was also the city's largest office tower by combined floor area, a title which was taken by QV1 when that building opened in 1994.

=== Post-construction ===
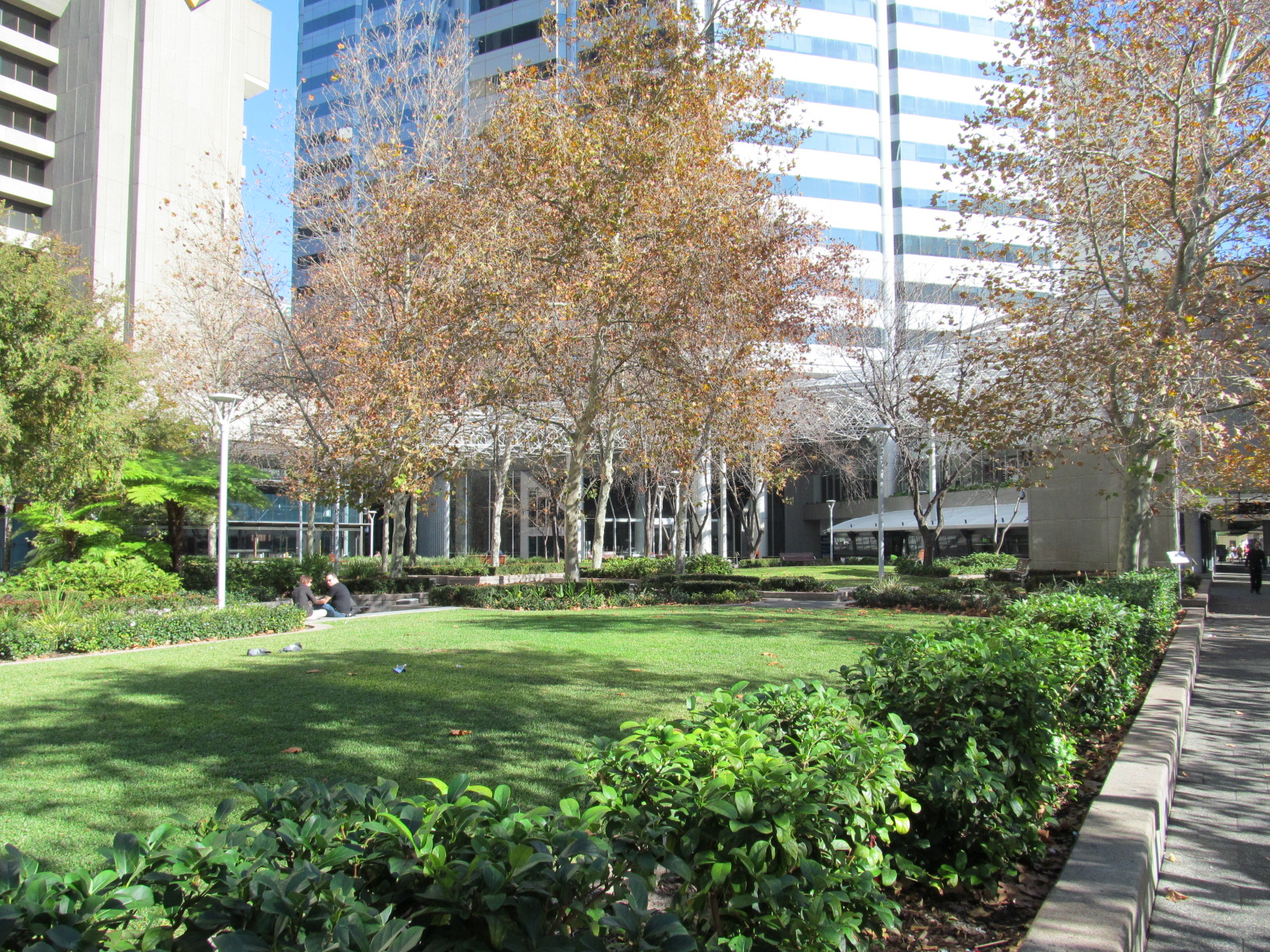
Gardens at the base of Central Park

Since its completion, Central Park has been regarded as one of Perth's leading premium office towers. However, in the years following its opening Central Park faced a sluggish office rental market and experienced high vacancy rates for several years. The tower now has a stated 66,500 m^{2} (716,000 sq ft) of office and retail space across 51 occupied floors. Major current tenants are Rio Tinto and WeWork. St George Bank also occupies some space in the building and in mid-2007 the St George logo was installed at the top of the tower and was removed in mid-2014. In mid-2015 the Rio Tinto logo was installed on the top four sides of the tower.

In September 1999, high winds during a heavy storm resulted in the dislodgement of some domes in the canopy over the building's forecourt. This led to the closure of St Georges Terrace entrance as a safety precaution. The building's then-owner, the Government Employees Superannuation Board, subsequently initiated legal action against the tower's builder Multiplex.

Since 2001, the tower has played host to an annual stair climb race up 53 flights of stairs to the roof. In 2008 the event raised $103,719 for MS Australia.

In 2003, the Perron Group purchased a 50% stake in the building.

Central Park has remained the tallest building in Perth since its completion.

In September 2024, a $66 million facelift was completed. This involved the replacement of panelling and lights.

== Design ==
Central Park was the fourth and largest stage in the plan by architects Forbes & Fitzhardinge for the surrounding commercial precinct, which included the AMP Building, the Commonwealth Bank building and the Wesley Centre. The design of the tower changed several times as the prospect of different planning concessions changed. The building as ultimately constructed measures 226 m (741 ft) from St Georges Terrace to the roof of the mechanical penthouse, and 261.7 m (859 ft) to the tip of its communications antenna.

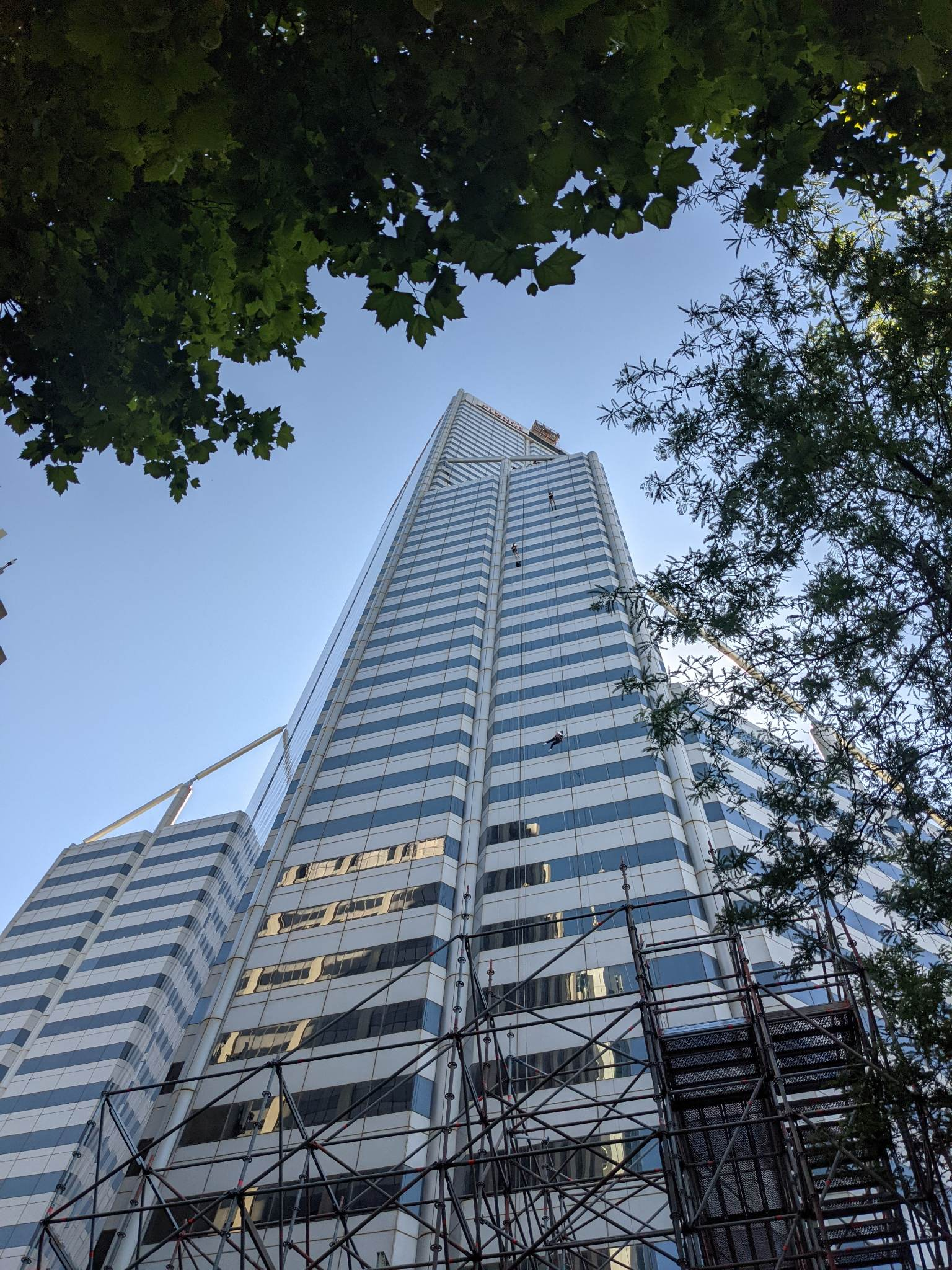
Central Park building in Perth, with abseilers

The tower has a composite steel and concrete frame featuring a pre-stressed, reinforced slip-form concrete core, which is stiffened by an outrigger truss at the top of the tower and at the various side setbacks. At the time of its completion, Central Park was the tallest core-stiffened building in Australia. The core stiffening method minimises the sway of the building in winds, which even after the core stiffening is around 30 cm (12 in) at the tower's top.

The use of a service core structure for the building minimised the number of internal columns that were needed, with only two on the largest floors, which maximised usable space. The 1,200-millimetre (47 in) diameter columns for the tower are made of composite steel and concrete, encased within a permanent formwork of Spiroduct tubing. The pre-cast floor slabs are supported by fire-treated steel beams and provided with a composite action by in-situ topping.

The profile of the building has multiple setbacks, to provide for variable floor areas to cater to the needs of different tenants. The plan of the tower is based upon a square, with triangular wings extending from opposite sides. The building was oriented to make best use of the relatively narrow frontage onto St Georges Terrace. The tower is clad with aluminium and glass curtain walls. The building has 5,000 sheets of glass, which get cleaned twice per year. Because of high winds, it can take up to 3 months to complete one window-washing circuit of the building. To clean the exterior faces of the building, the window cleaners have to move vertically over 10 kilometres (6.2 mi).

Central Park was noted upon its opening for being technologically advanced, with "fully computerised air conditioning", which uses data from 1,400 sensors on each floor to regulate temperatures in an energy-efficient way. From its uppermost floors, there are views out to Kings Park and the Indian Ocean. However, members of the public are not permitted to observe from the building except on designated charity days.

The podium of the building is clad with stone to complement the surrounding street frontages, and the foyer is decorated with murals by artist Brian McKay on 223 m^{2} (2,400 sq ft) of aluminium wall panels. In addition to the 64,000 m^{2} (690,000 sq ft) of office space, 3,000 m^{2} (32,000 sq ft) of retail space and 1,030 basement car-parking bays in the project at completion, the site also includes a 5,000 m^{2} (54,000 sq ft) landscaped park, which leads towards the intended focal point of the precinct, the restored Wesley Church on the opposite side of Hay Street. The architects intended the park to act as a "breathing space in the hard linear nature of the Hay Street Mall". The park contains sunken seated areas and raised grassed areas, as well as a fountain as the centrepiece. There is also a fountain and a large plaza area which provides a pedestrian thoroughfare to St Georges Terrace. It has been variously described as "magnificent", "one of the few green strips in the city outside the grassed area on the river foreshore", the "green lungs of the city", and "a backyard-sized patch of grass".

== Gallery ==
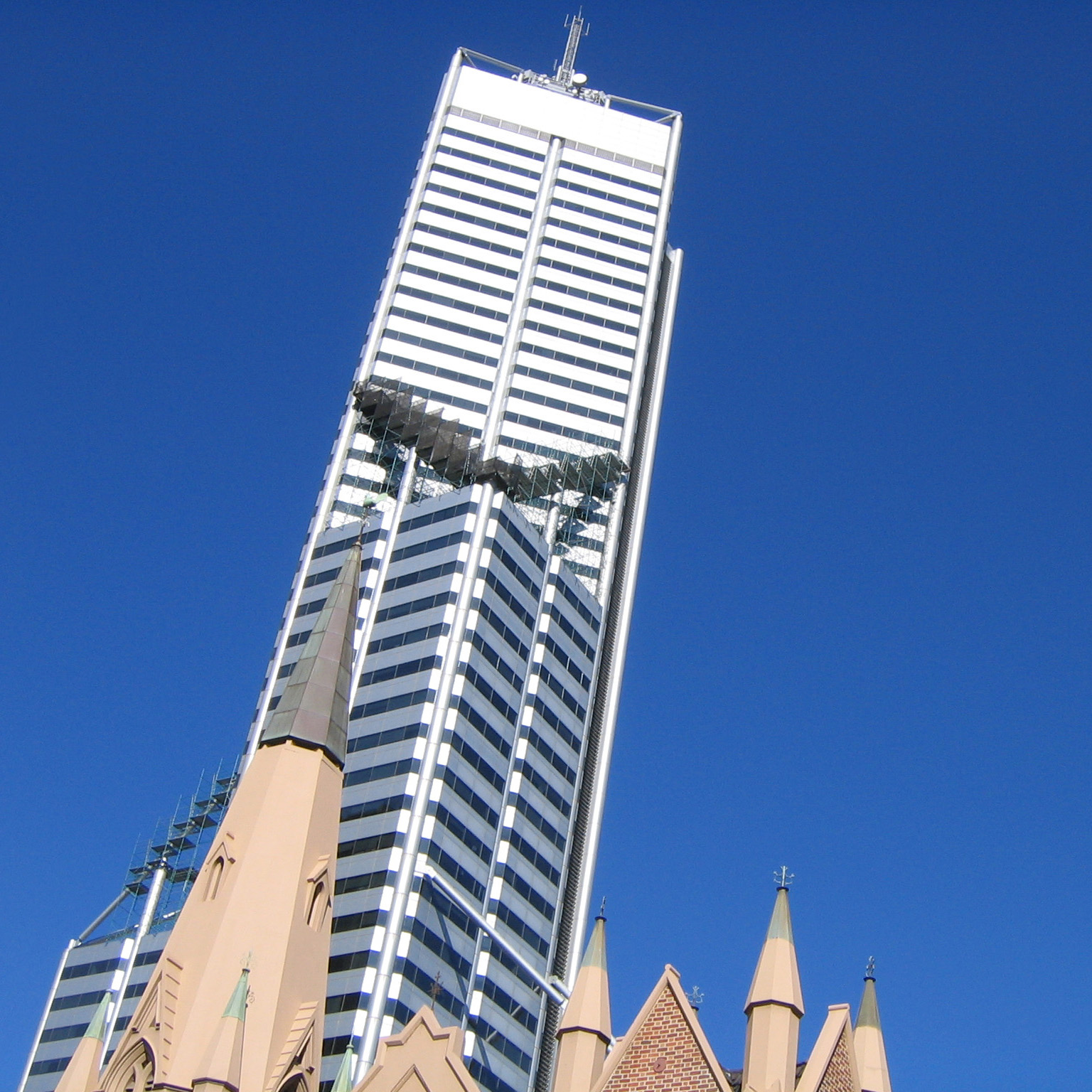
The building seen behind the spires of the Wesley Church

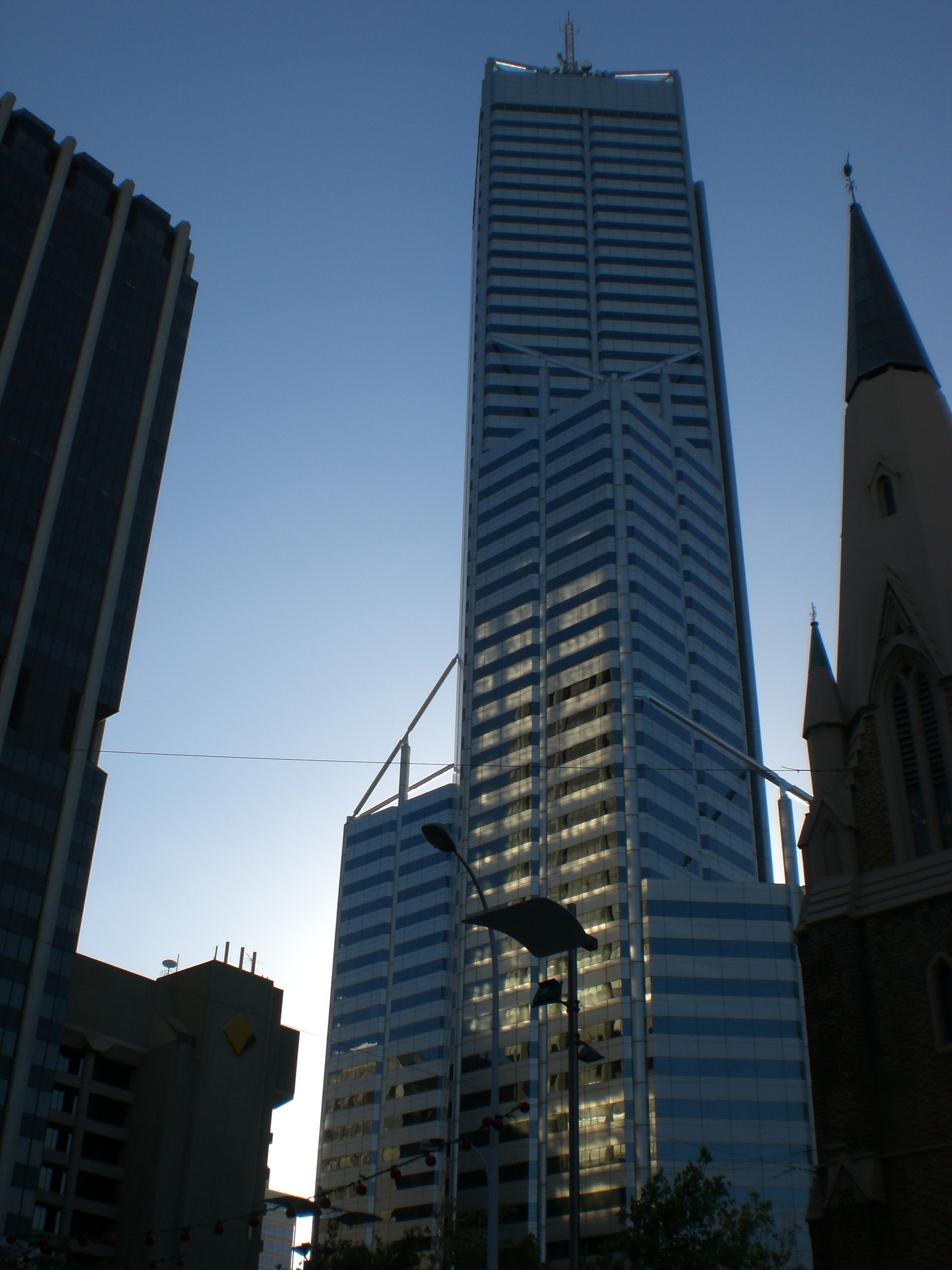
The building seen at dusk

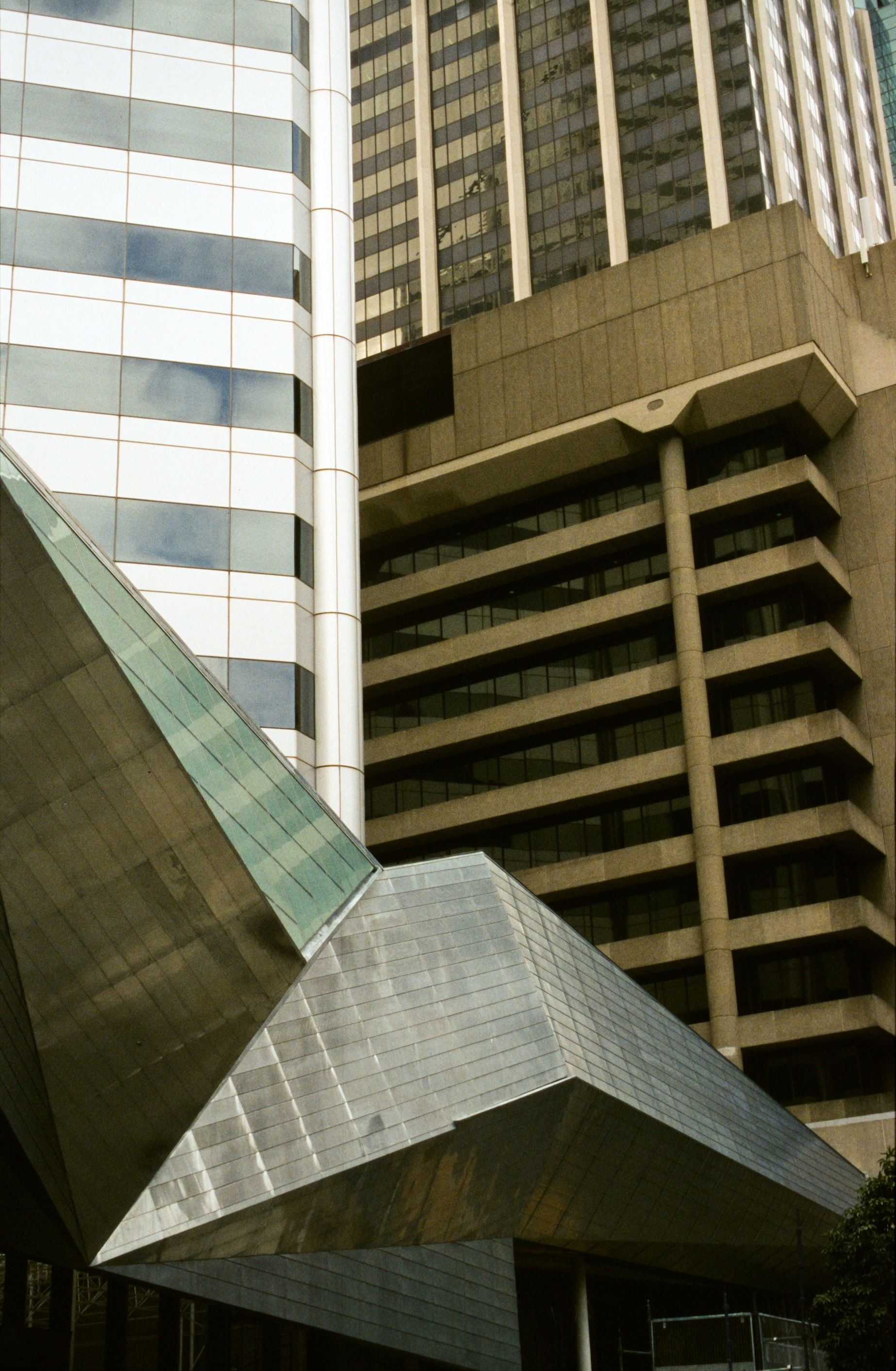
Central Park awnings

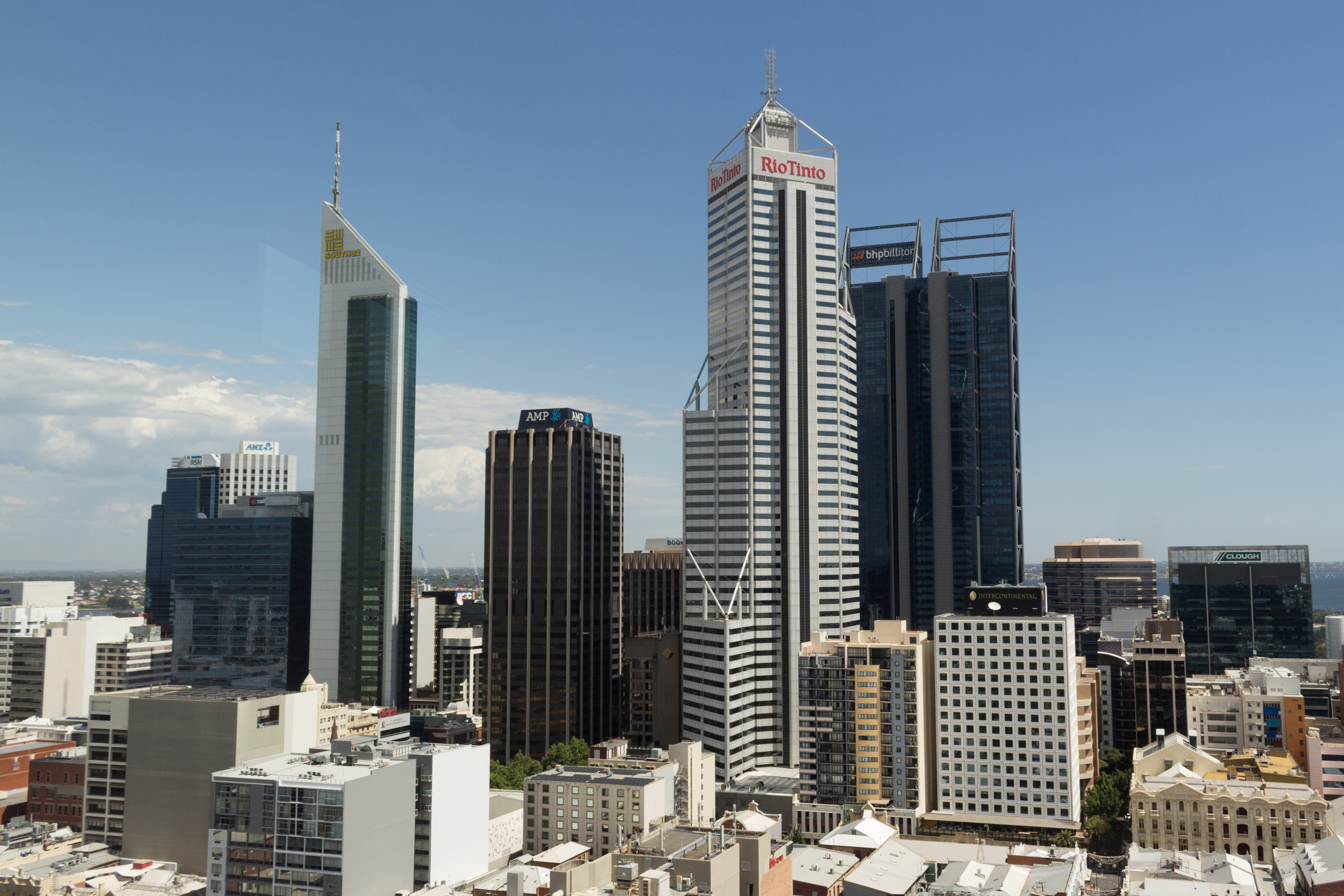
Central Park as seen from KS1
