= Melbourne Hotel =

Hotel in Perth, Western Australia

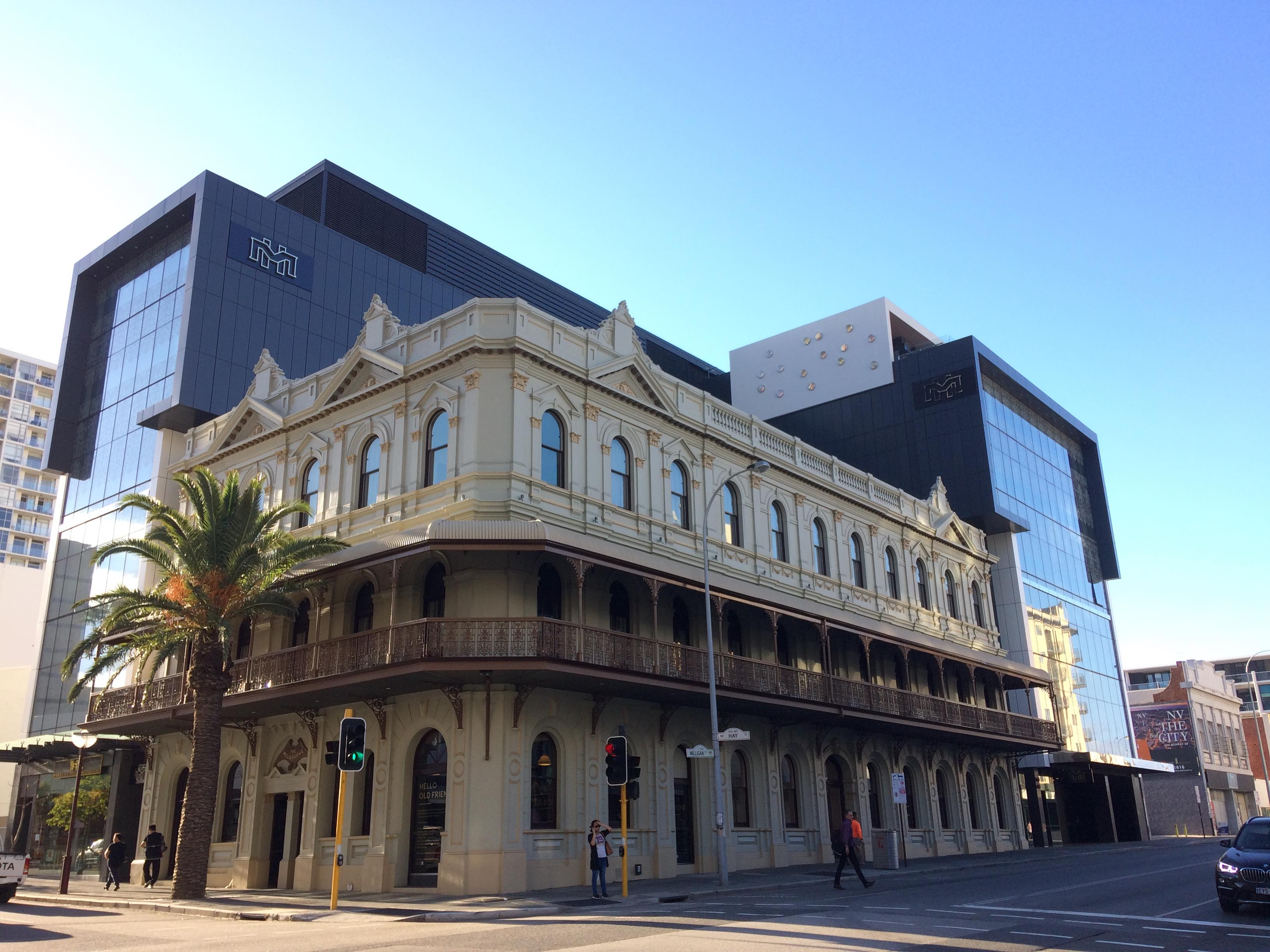
- Viewed from intersection of Murray and Milligan streets in 2018
- Interactive map of the Melbourne Hotel area
- Alternative names: Old Melbourne Hotel

General information
- Type: Hotel
- Architectural style: Federation Free Classical
- Location: Corner Hay Street and Milligan Street, 942 Hay Street, Perth, Western Australia
- Coordinates: 31°57′05″S 115°51′06″E
- Opened: April 1897
- Renovated: 1971, 1994–95, 1997, 2015–2018
- Client: John De Baun
- Owner: Oaksfield Pty Ltd

Technical details
- Floor count: 3

Design and construction
- Architecture firm: Peter John Wilson

Renovating team
- Architects: Oldham, Boas, Ednie-Brown (1994–95), Buchan Group (2015–2018)

Website
- www.melbournehotel.com.au

Western Australia Heritage Register
- Type: State Registered Place
- Designated: 21 January 1997
- Reference no.: 2005

The Melbourne Hotel is a heritage listed landmark hotel in Perth, Western Australia. The hotel is located on the corner of Hay Street and Milligan Street.

== History ==
In the 1890s, in the wake of the Western Australian gold rush, American-born mining investor and hotelier John De Baun (1852–1912) moved to Perth with the intent of investing in real estate. In 1896, he purchased the Eagle Tavern on the corner of Hay Street and Milligan Street from the Swan Brewery Company, and demolished it. De Braun engaged Fremantle-based architect Peter John Wilson (1869–1918) to design a new hotel to replace it. The building is designed in the Federation Free Classical style, and named after Melbourne Street that at the time extended to nearby Murray Street.

The hotel officially opened in April 1897, serving both boarders and visitors to the city during the gold rush. On 20 September 1898, Grace Lannin, the licensee of the hotel, was the first person charged for selling liquor after 11 pm without a permit; she was fined 20 shillings, equivalent to A$181 in 2022.

Although it was still being used as a hotel until the 1970s, it also served as a pub for the most part of the twentieth century. In 1970 John Murdoch and Robert Stowe acquired the property, they then transferred the title to a syndicate of Western Australians (including Len Buckeridge), trading as Melbourne Hotel Pty Ltd. Buckeridge's company, L. W. Buckeridge and Associates, drew up the plans for the first major work undertaken on the hotel. These works involved extensive additions to the west side of the hotel and internal renovations. In the 1970s, the ground and first floors were used as a nightclub and cabaret lounge. Later, in the 1980s and 1990s, they were known as Tiffany's Nightclub, The Firm Nightclub, The Pink Galah Cabaret, Middleways Piano Bar, and Meccanos.

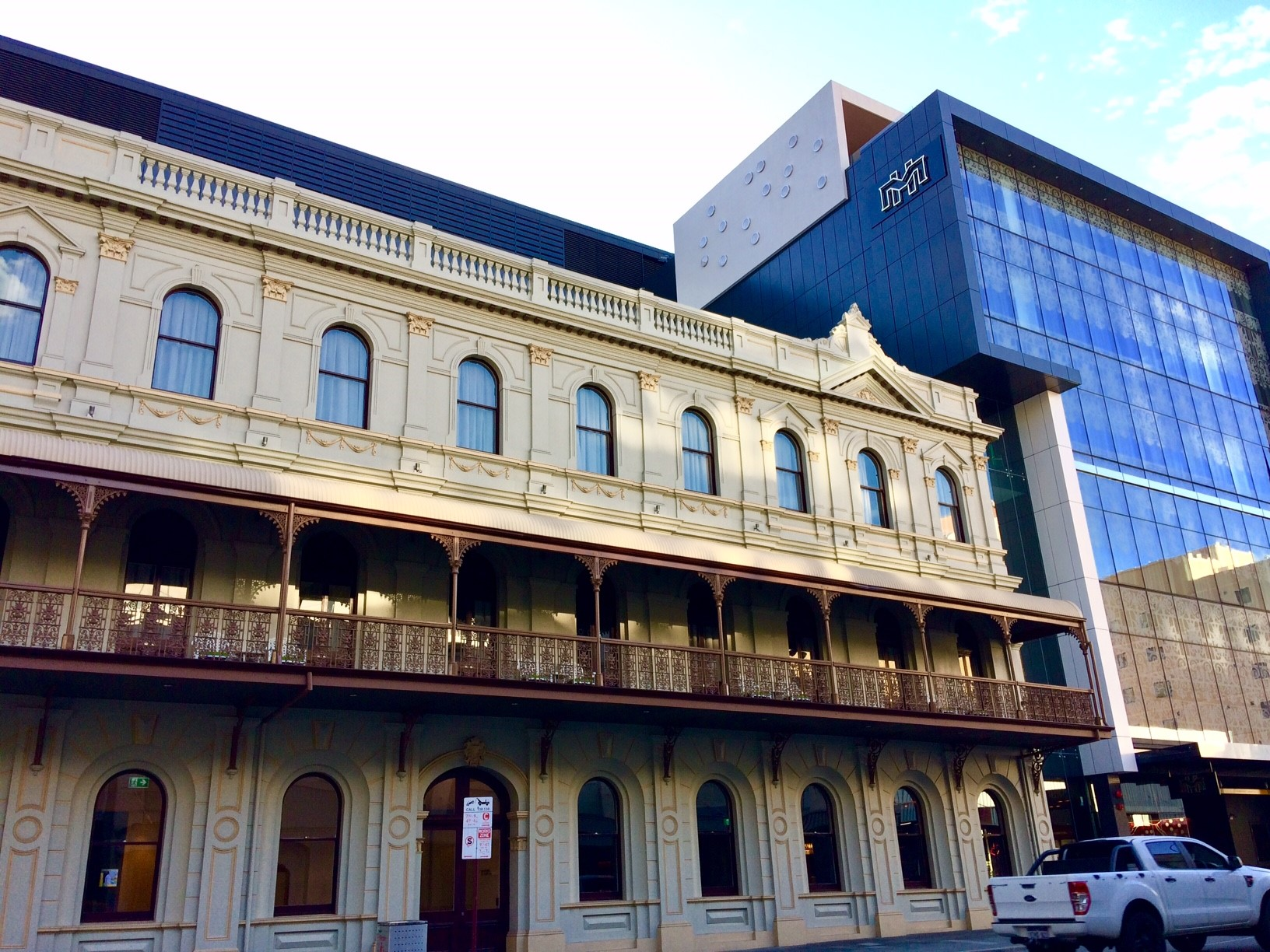
The Melbourne Hotel on Milligan Street.

In 1993 the building was purchased by Decanning Ltd, who renovated it for the use of a private business club, The Old Melbourne Club. The company engaged the architectural firm of Oldham Boas Ednie-Brown to undertake the renovations, which included a western extension of the Hay Street frontage to match the existing structure. The renovations occurred from 1994 to 1995, and included the restoration of the cantilevered balcony, together with the grand timber staircase and decorative ceilings, to their original splendour.

In 2006, Singaporean-company Oakesfield Pty Ltd took ownership of the Melbourne Hotel. The Buchan Group architectural firm undertook renovations of the building from 2015–2018, which included demolition of the 1990s additions to the building and their replacement with a seven-storey structure that wrapped around the building. The $40 million redevelopment included 73 guest rooms, function rooms and five food and drink venues. The front bar was reopened as De Baun & Co in honour of the original building owner John De Baun.

== Architectural character ==
It is a three-storey brick building with a pitched corrugated iron roof concealed behind an elaborate parapet. The facade has a painted stucco finish, round-headed timber windows and door openings arched with false stonework, attached columns, pilasters, triangular pediments and projecting mouldings, all in Federation Free Classical style. It features an elegant first floor balcony, cantilevered out over the pavement on both street frontages, supported on cast iron decorative brackets, cast iron columns and lacework with a bullnosed corrugated iron roof. The interior features include timber floor and roof construction, plastered wall finishes, timber joinery and mouldings, and decorative plaster ceilings, a decorative timber staircase, a metal lift car with leadlight doors and some leaded glass in fanlights to windows in the Hay Street facade.

== Heritage value ==
The Melbourne Hotel was entered onto the Register of the National Estate by the Australian Heritage Commission on 1 November 1988. On 21 January 1997 it was placed on the permanent State Heritage Register. It was included on the City of Perth's Municipal Heritage Inventory on 13 March 2001. Additionally, it was classified by the National Trust of Australia (WA) on 7 December 1987.
