= John Glowrey =

Australian politician

The Honourable John Glowrey JP
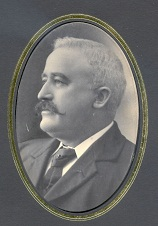

Member of the Western Australian Legislative Council
- In office 5 September 1900 – 21 May 1904
- Preceded by: (new seat)
- Succeeded by: William Oats
- Constituency: South Province
- In office 22 May 1906 – 21 May 1912
- Preceded by: Thomas Brimage
- Succeeded by: James Cornell

Personal details
- Born: 24 May 1856 Warrnambool, Victoria, Australia
- Died: 12 June 1921 (aged 65) Perth, Western Australia
- Party: Independent
- Spouse(s): (1) Norah (Nora) Youlden (2) Hannah Marion Ryan
- Children: 9 (including Lindsay Gordon Glowrey)
- Relatives: Niece: Dr Mary Glowrey

John Thomas Glowrey JP (24 May 1856 – 12 June 1921) was an Australian politician who served as a member of the Western Australian Legislative Council for the South Province in two separate terms (1900–1904 and 1906–1912). A Victorian-born publican who arrived during the Coolgardie gold rush, he became mayor of Coolgardie before entering parliament and later operating the prominent Palace Hotel in Perth. He was also a sharebroker, Justice of the Peace, and absentee landowner.

== Early life ==
Glowrey was born on 24 May 1856 in Warrnambool, Victoria, the son of James Glowrey, a farmer and storekeeper, and Eliza (née Barry). He married twice: first to Norah (Nora) Youlden in Victoria, and second to Hannah Marion Ryan in 1890.

== Goldfields career ==
Glowrey arrived in Western Australia in 1893 during the gold rushes and settled in Coolgardie. He worked as a publican, becoming proprietor of the Royal Hotel in Bayley Street. In 1897–1898 he served as mayor of the Coolgardie Municipality.

== Parliamentary career ==
In September 1900 Glowrey was elected to the Legislative Council for the newly created South Province as an independent. He served until 1904, when he was defeated, but regained the seat in 1906 and served until 1912.

Speaking as a representative of the goldfields, he urged continued government attention to railways and public works in the Goldfields districts, amendments to the mining regulations, and progress on the vital issue of water supply.

== Business and later interests ==
From 1903 until his death, Glowrey leased and operated the ornate Palace Hotel on St Georges Terrace, Perth from John De Baun. He was appointed a Justice of the Peace (JP) by 1903.

== Personal life and death ==
Glowrey and his second wife Hannah had several children, including Lindsay Gordon Glowrey, who was killed in action in France in 1917 while serving with the Australian Imperial Force. Glowrey was also the paternal uncle of Dr. Mary Glowrey, the Australian medical missionary.

He died at the Palace Hotel on 12 June 1921, aged 65, and was buried at Karrakatta Cemetery in Perth.
