= 108 St Georges Terrace =

Skyscraper in Perth, Western Australia

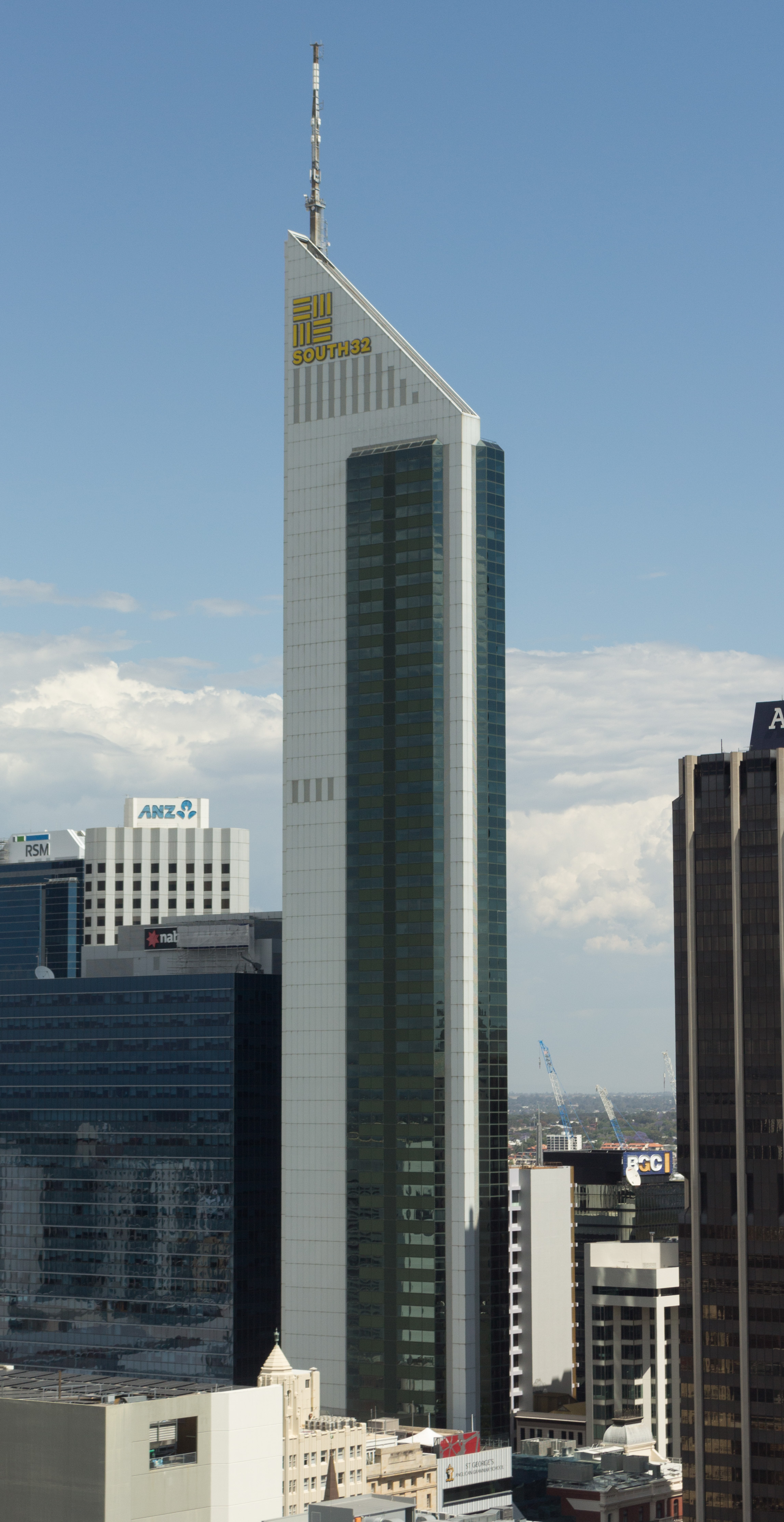
- 108 St Georges Terrace tower in 2017

General information
- Type: Office
- Location: Perth, Western Australia, 108 St Georges Terrace
- Coordinates: 31°57′16″S 115°51′25.5″E
- Construction started: 1981
- Completed: 1988
- Cost: A$120 million
- Owner: Lendlease; Realside Financial

Height
- Antenna spire: 247 metres (810 ft)
- Roof: 214 metres (702 ft)

Technical details
- Floor count: 50 (plus 2 below ground)
- Floor area: 39,500 square metres (425,000 ft^{2})
- Lifts/elevators: 15

Design and construction
- Architect: Cameron Chisholm Nicol
- Developer: Austmark International and R&I Bank
- Main contractor: Multiplex

Website
- palacetower.com.au

108 St Georges Terrace, also Palace Tower and formerly the South32 Tower, Bankwest Tower, Bond Tower, and R&I Tower, is a fifty-storey office building in Perth, Western Australia. The project was initiated in 1981 and completed in 1988, and the building measures 214 metres (702 ft) to its roof and 247 metres (810 ft) to the tip of its communications antenna. Upon completion, it was Perth's tallest building until Central Park surpassed it in 1992. It is the third-tallest building in Perth.

The tower, designed by the architect firm Cameron Chisholm Nicol, features a triangular cross-section and stepped front to maximise natural light and corner offices. Extensive testing ensured the building's resilience to extreme weather conditions. The completed building rests upon 43 belled concrete and steel piles, with a sixteen-metre-deep basement featuring a diaphragm wall to prevent water ingress.

The site occupied by the tower was previously the location of the Palace Hotel. There was organised opposition to save the hotel from demolition to make way for an office tower. The businessman Alan Bond subsequently acquired the site, and the tower was approved and constructed in a way that retained much of the Palace Hotel. The building served as the headquarters of Bond's companies until their collapse. It later became the headquarters of Bankwest (formerly the R&I Bank) until 2012. In 2015 it became the headquarters of the mining company South32.

== History ==
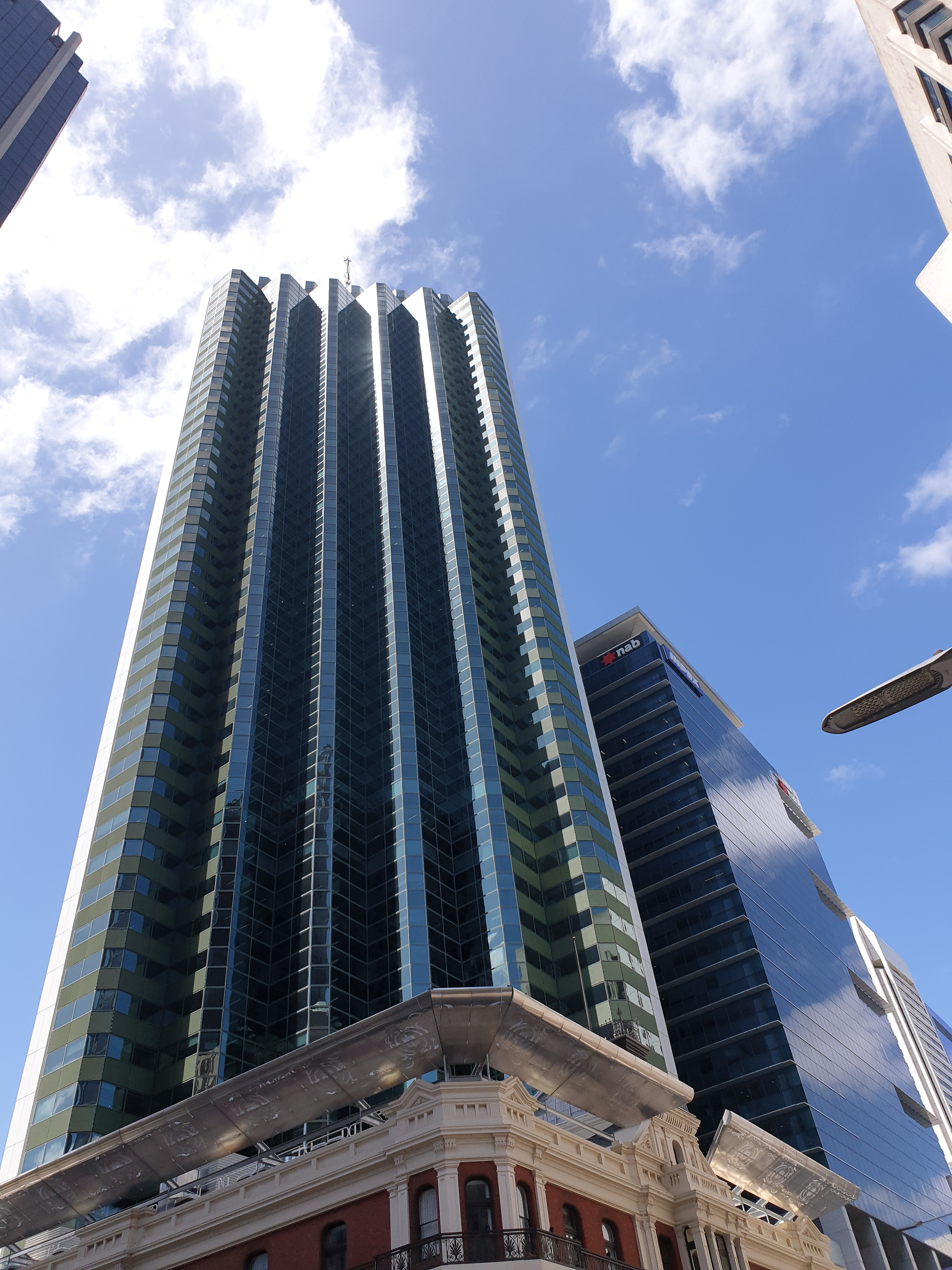
The building photographed from St George's Terrace

=== Pre-1978 ===
The tower's prime location at the corner of William Street and St Georges Terrace was the site of the first licensed premises in Perth from the 1830s. The then-opulent Palace Hotel opened on this corner in 1897 during the days of the Western Australian gold rush, and developed a "colourful" history, hosting numerous celebrities of the time. The plot was purchased by the Commonwealth Banking Corporation, which announced in 1972 that it planned to redevelop the site as high-rise offices.

During the 1950s and 1960s, many of Perth's older buildings had been demolished to make way for modern developments, which led to wide criticism of the Perth City Council for approving such redevelopments. In this atmosphere, wide public protest resulted and a lobby group of concerned citizens calling themselves "The Palace Guards" worked to save the historic building. This outcry led to condemnation of the plans and heritage listing of the property by the National Trust, and forced the Commonwealth Bank to ask the Federal Government to take the property off its hands. The property was subsequently purchased from the Commonwealth Bank by businessman Alan Bond in 1978 along with the adjacent Terrace Arcade.

=== Bond Corporation and construction: 1978–1988 ===
In 1980, Bond unveiled new plans for the redevelopment of the site. These plans made some effort at preservation of the Palace Hotel, by retaining the facade and main foyer area of the building. However, the construction of the modern office tower at the site's north-eastern corner required demolition of Terrace Arcade, the eastern accommodation wing and the hotel's renowned dining room. The rationale given for the works required was that extensive renovations to the Palace Hotel in 1915 and the 1930s had weakened its structure significantly, as well as problems controlling white ants in the structure. The development exceeded the acceptable plot ratio in the town planning scheme, however the Perth City Council pre-approved the plans nonetheless, on the condition that Bond Corporation kept the Palace Hotel operating as a hotel.

Demolition of parts of the site commenced in August 1981, and by August 1983 construction had completed on the tower's foundation and three levels of underground parking. However, there were continuing doubts about the viability of the building, slowing the pace of the development. This changed on 7 September 1984 when R&I Bank chairman David Fischer signed a joint venture agreement over the development with Austmark International, a subsidiary of Bond Corporation. The bank, which was at the time wholly owned by the Government of Western Australia, consulted then-Premier Brian Burke in deciding whether to invest in the project.

Following the investment in the project by the bank, the developers successfully sought modification of the original planning approval by the Perth City Council to allow the use of the Palace Hotel as a bank, rather than remaining as a public hotel. With this permission, construction of the development by Multiplex proceeded, and floor space was leased rapidly; by October 1985 only four floors of the building remained for lease and it was expected to be fully let before completion. With construction finally proceeding once more, the Palace Hotel closed in June 1986. In April 1987, while the tower was still under construction, five men were arrested after illegally entering the site and parachuting from the top of the tower in the early hours of the morning. Construction proceeded at the rate of about one floor every eight to ten days.

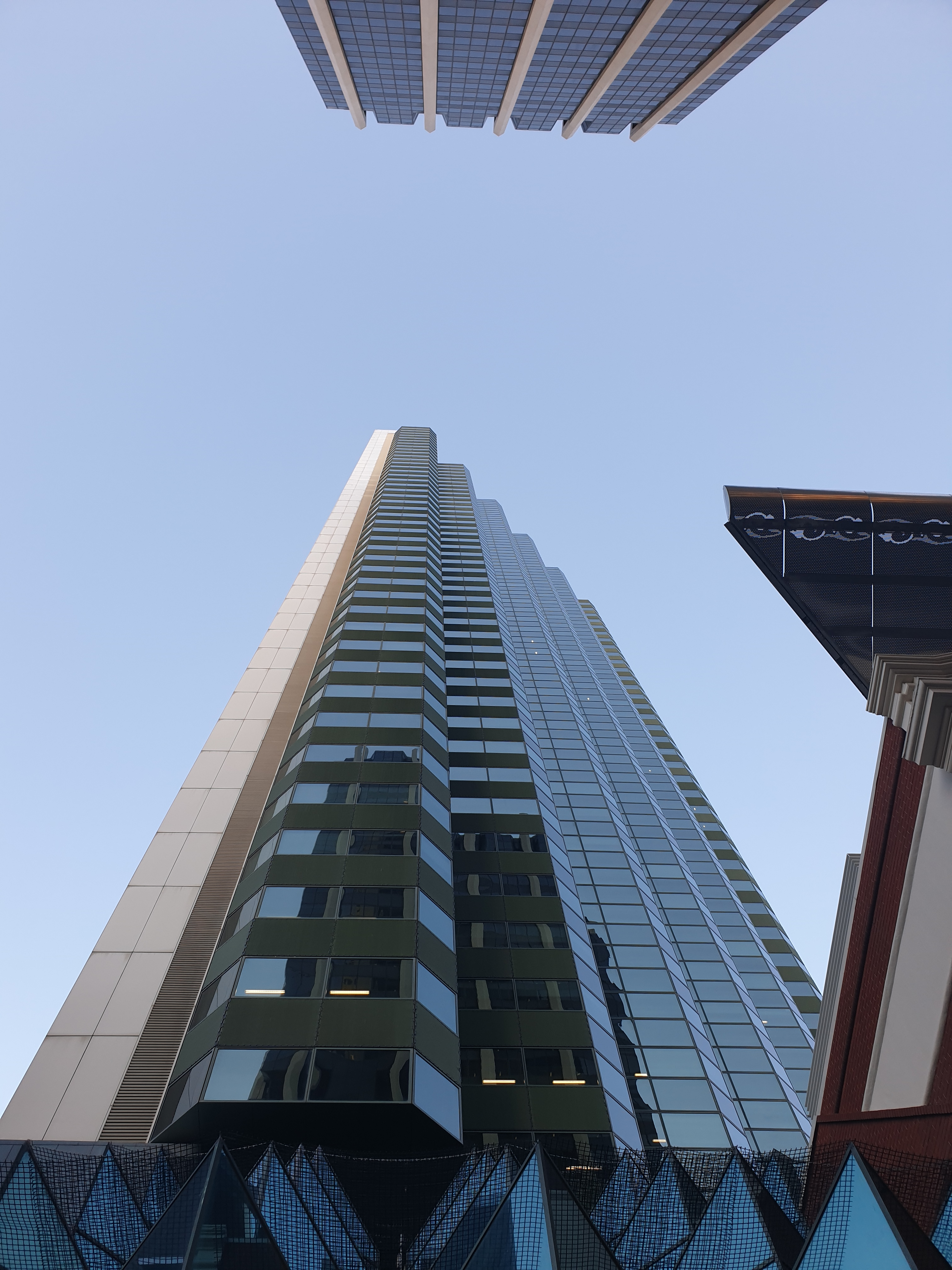
108 St Georges Terrace and 140 St Georges Terrace

The construction of the tower took three years to complete, with the first occupants moving into the tower in July 1988. The tower was officially opened in October 1989. Construction of the building cost A$120 million, up from the 1984 estimates of $100 million. Upon its completion, the building was the 88th-tallest building in the world, the third-tallest in Australia and the tallest in Perth (overtaking St Martins Tower). It was also the eighth-tallest concrete skyscraper in the world. However, at this time there were already plans to build a taller building on the site of the former David Jones department store between Hay Street and St Georges Terrace, which became Central Park.

=== After completion: 1988–present ===
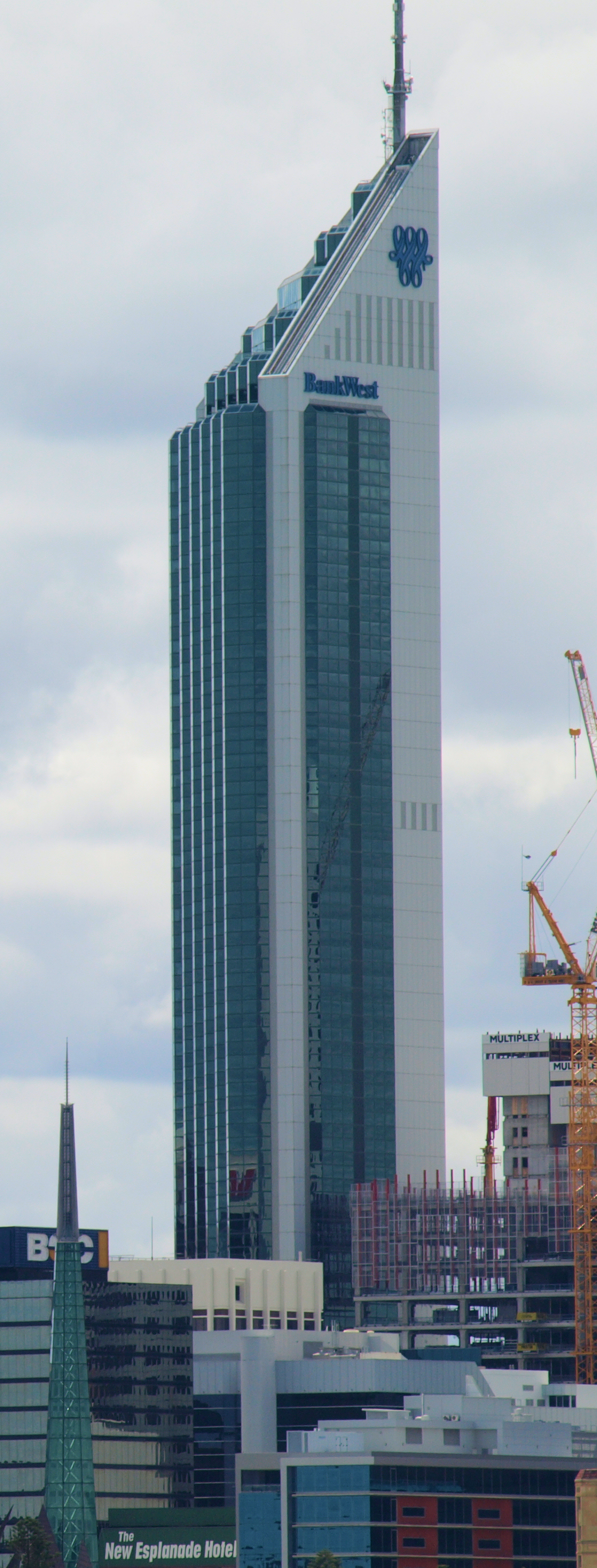
The tower with the Bankwest signage

The top three floors of the building were occupied by Alan Bond's private investment company Dallhold Investments, which owned a majority stake in Bond Corporation. In November 1987, Alan Bond bought the Vincent van Gogh painting Irises and unveiled it in a purpose-built secure art gallery on the 49th floor of the tower on 23 December 1988. Amidst a worsening financial situation for the Bond companies, Bond Corporation sold its half share in the building to R&I Bank for $108 million, making R&I Bank its outright owner. In 1991 amid the collapse of the Bond empire, Bond shifted his offices out of the tower, leaving the top three floors vacant. These floors then remained vacant for almost a decade.

From when it opened, the tower was referred to as both the Bond Tower and the R&I Tower, owing to the presence of both logos on the building's exterior. The Bond Corporation logos were later removed from the tower, and by the end of 1994, the signage on the building was updated to match the new name and logo of its owner and head tenant, Bankwest.

Bankwest sold the building in November 1994 for $146 million to Jetcloud Pty Ltd, which was owned by AMP and UniSuper. However, Bankwest retained the head lease over the building, and in 2000 the Bank occupied around 20 floors. In 2002, Valad purchased a half-share in the tower for $92.5 million, which it then sold to Stockland in early 2007. Meanwhile, Brookfield inherited its half-stake in the tower through its 2007 acquisition of Multiplex, who had merged with Ronin Property Group (the renamed AMP Office Trust) in late 2004.

Bankwest announced in 2006 that it would not renew its lease, instead moving to a new tower proposed for Raine Square. Due to delays with the Raine Square development, Bankwest was forced in November 2009 to seek a 5-year renewal of its lease in the Bankwest Tower, the remainder of which will be taken on by Raine Square property developer Saracen Properties. Saracen Properties announced in May 2009 that they would not seek to renew their lease, and would vacate at the termination of their lease in November 2009. It was also revealed that the 50th floor office space once occupied by Alan Bond was still in the same condition as when he left in 1991, with Bond's former chair, desk and boardroom table available as part of the lease.

Brookfield put its half share in the building up for sale in early 2008, however an offer for the tower by Luke Saraceni fell through and the half share in the tower was taken off the property market. Stockland divested their 50% holding via an asset swap in 2011, transferring full ownership of the tower to Brookfield in exchange for two residential projects.

It was announced in January 2015 that base metal and mining company South32 would sign a 10½-year lease for 8,300 square metres (89,000 ft^{2}) of office space, starting from May 2015. The company also took up the naming and rooftop signage rights for the tower.

In 2017 a number of glass panels shattered dropping some glass fragments. In response the building owners installed temporary gantries to protect pedestrians while carrying out rectification works.

In May 2022, Brookfield commenced a sale process for the building, with an expected price of $350 million. The process was concluded in October 2022, with the building being sold for $340 million to a 50/50 joint venture between Lendlease and Realside Financial.

In March 2023, South32 announced that they would exit the building in mid to late 2025, aligning with the end of their lease, and relocate their offices into newly refurbished space at the adjacent 100 St Georges Terrace.

In April 2024, it was announced that the tower would be renamed Palace Tower in light of South32's exit in 2025. The new name is a reference to the Palace Hotel, and was announced alongside a $10 million refurbishment to the building in a bid to attract a new anchor tenant and to stand out in a competitive market.

== Design ==
The tower was designed by architects Cameron Chisholm Nicol. The major parameter given to them in the planning of the building was that "all office areas should face the excellent views that exist of the Swan River". Working within this brief, they selected a triangular cross-section of the tower because it lent "itself to open plan office layouts" by allowing natural light to reach most parts of the working floors. Also, the stepped front of the building maximised the number of corner offices on each floor. The eastern and northern sides of the building are slip-formed concrete shear walls, and have fewer windows. These sides house the services of the building, including the lift shafts and stairwells. Some difficulty was encountered in the design stage with how to execute the diagonal slopes forming the top of these walls alongside the top five floors of the building, since a standard concrete pour was not possible. Instead, reinforced concrete panels were prefabricated elsewhere and subsequently attached to the structure.

The floor plates of the tower are constructed from conventional reinforced concrete beams and slabs. The building's 14 passenger lifts are divided into three zones: low-rise (floors G-17), mid-rise (18–29) and high-rise (30–51), thought to be the first building in Australia to use such a configuration.

The foyer of the tower was originally planned to be an open-air forecourt between the building and the remains of the Palace Hotel, however extensive aeroelastic wind testing of the structure by the Institute of Environmental Sciences at Murdoch University forced this area to be covered with a glass canopy. Mocks of the curtain walls to be used in the tower were also tested to 1.5 times the proof load to ensure they could withstand cyclone-force weather and seismic shocks. The building is clad with green-tinted double-pane glass on windows, with the service core and structure of the building covered with aluminium sheeting skin coated with a light grey fluoropolymer paint.

Upon completion, the mass of the building above ground was 66,000 tonnes (146,000,000 lb). The building rests upon 43 belled concrete and steel piles, of average length 30 metres (98 ft), which go "through 3 layers of swamp" to solid siltstone bedrock. These piles range in diameter from 2.5 metres (8 ft 2 in) to 2.9 metres (9 ft 6 in). The basement of the building has a depth of 16 metres (52 ft), and has a 0.5-metre (1 ft 8 in) thick diaphragm wall to prevent water ingress.

While the building was under construction, on 21 September 1987 the Perth City Council approved the addition of a 48-metre (157 ft) spire to the top of the tower to house television and radio antennas, microwave antennas, navigation lights and surveillance cameras. However, when asked about the surveillance cameras, the R&I Bank's development spokesman Terry Pilbeam denied any knowledge about what any cameras would be used for. The spire was also approved by the Department of Transport and Communications, which said the spire would cause no air traffic problems, and the spire was added to the building upon completion.

== Gallery ==
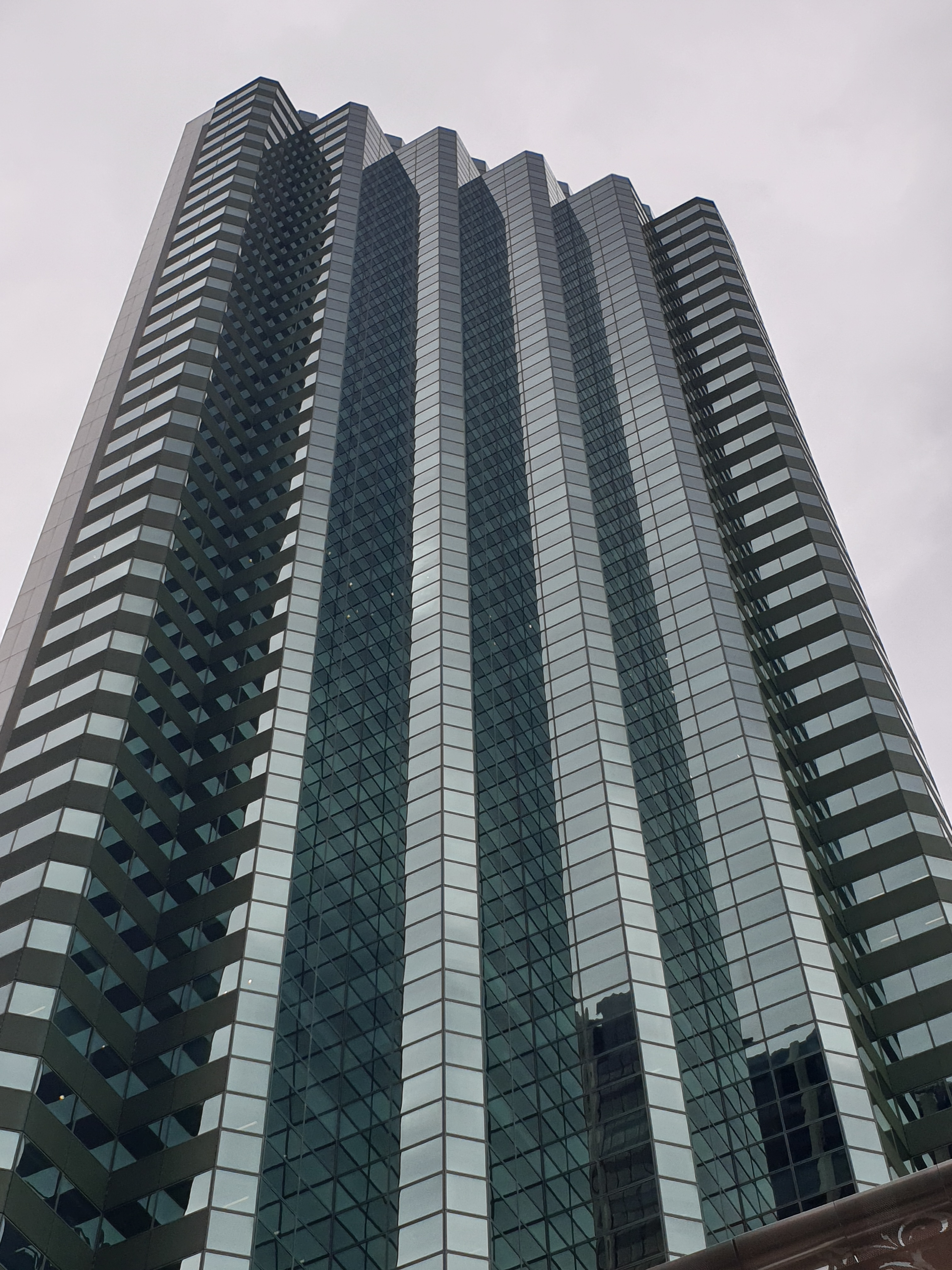
108's glass windows

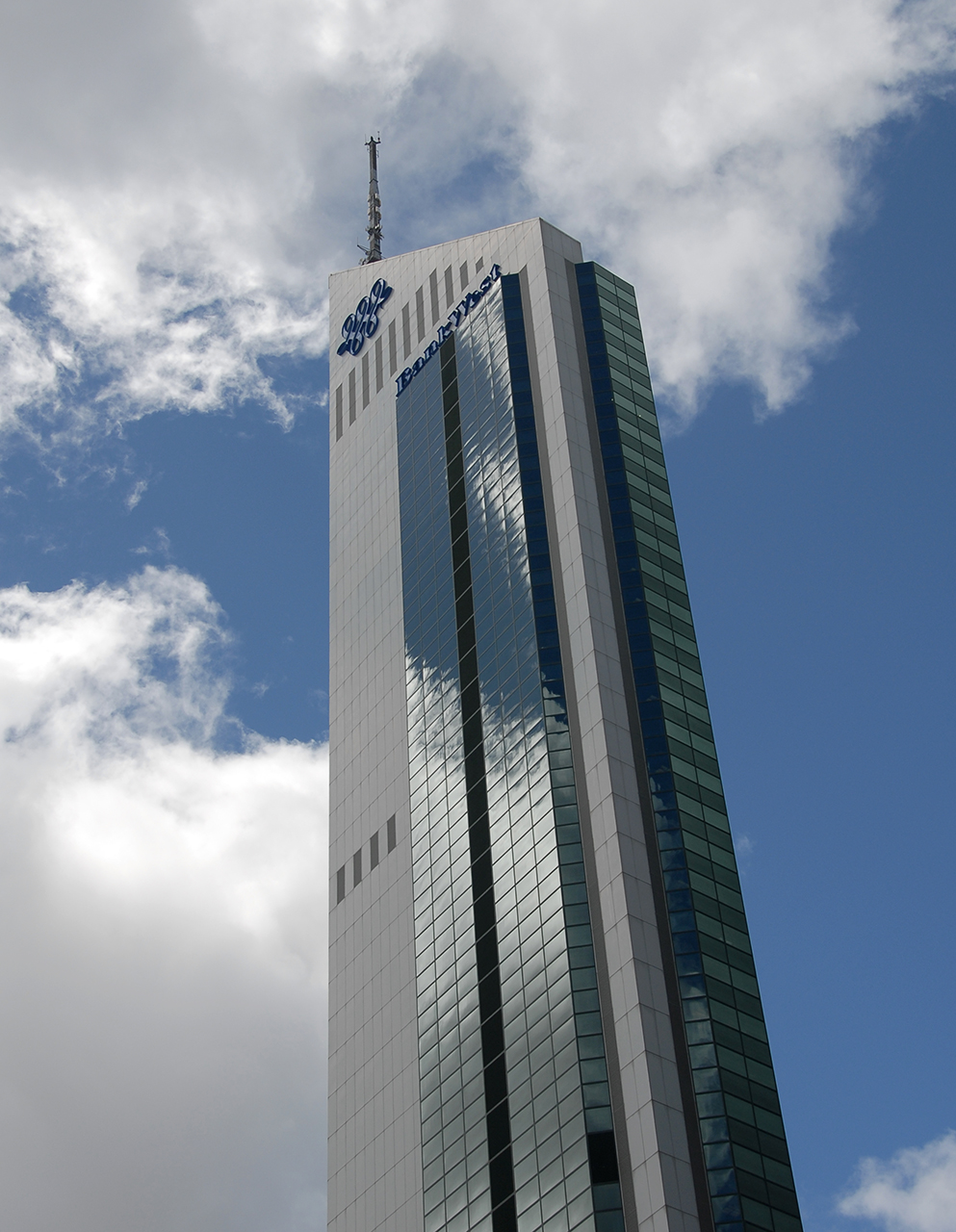
The northern side of the tower as viewed from William Street

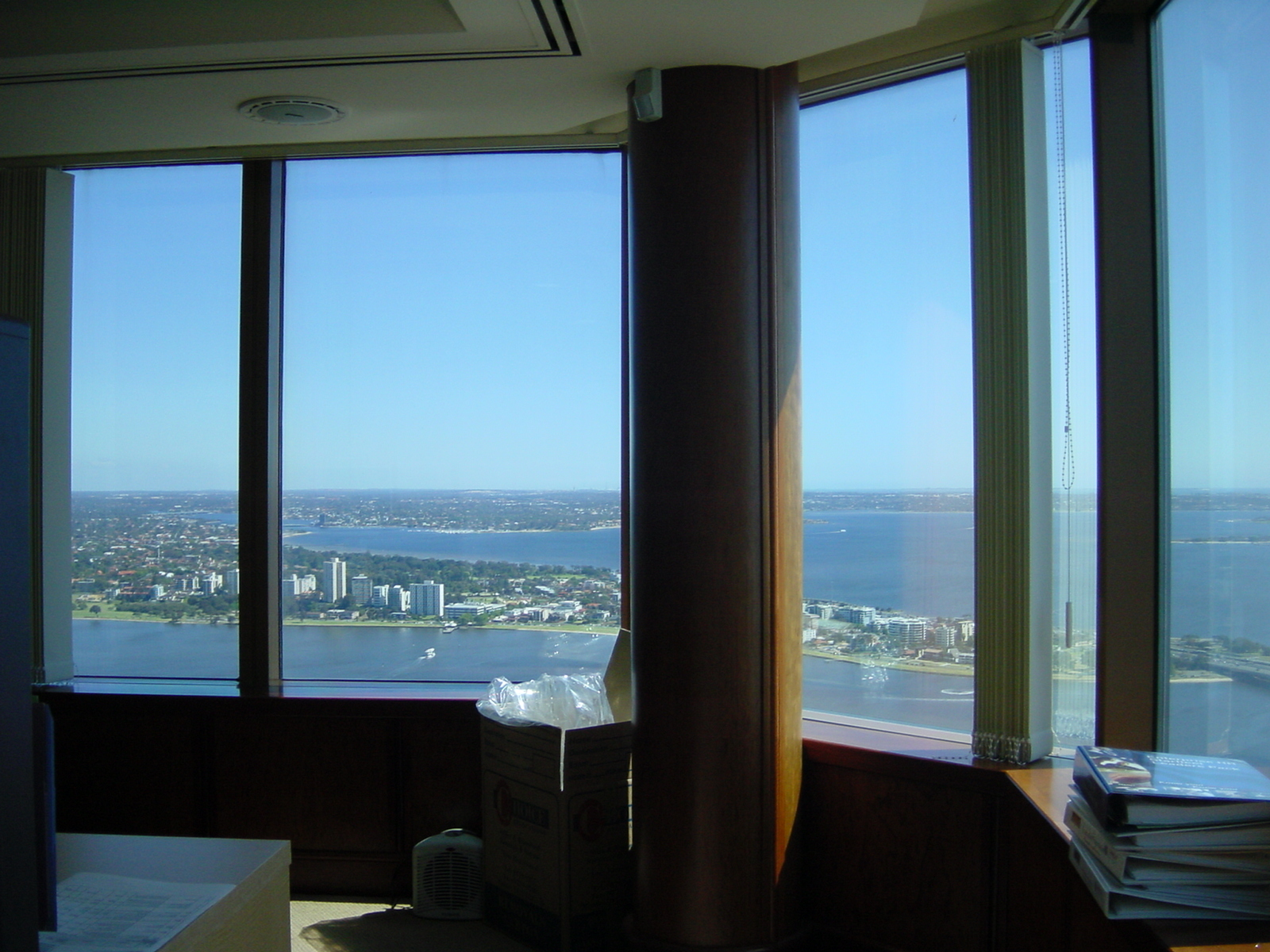
A typical view over the Swan River from an office in the tower

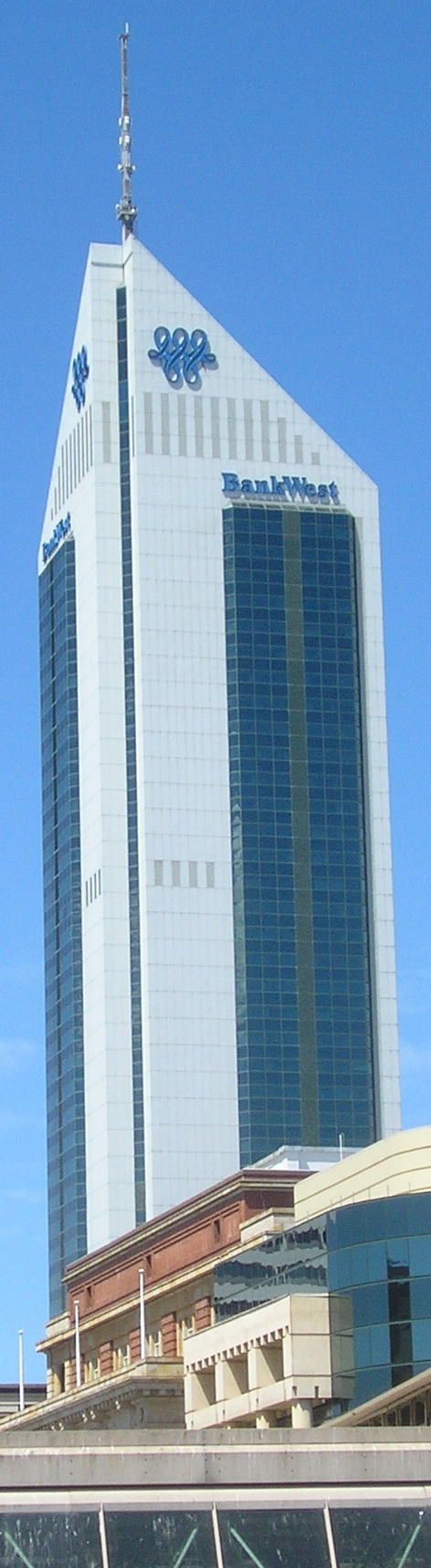
A view showing the north and east sides of the building, which contain the service cores

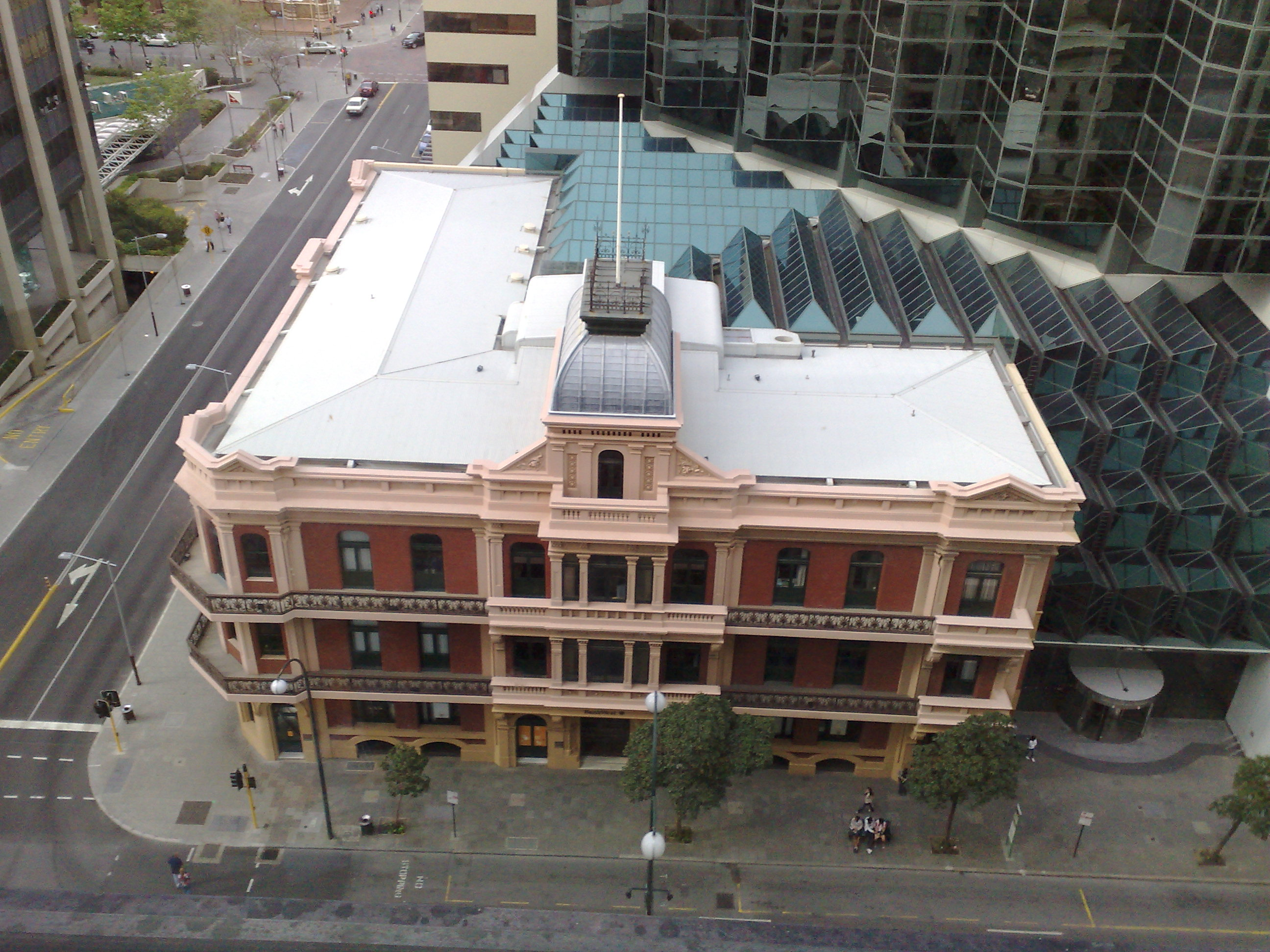
The Palace Hotel and the forecourt's distinctive spiked glass roof

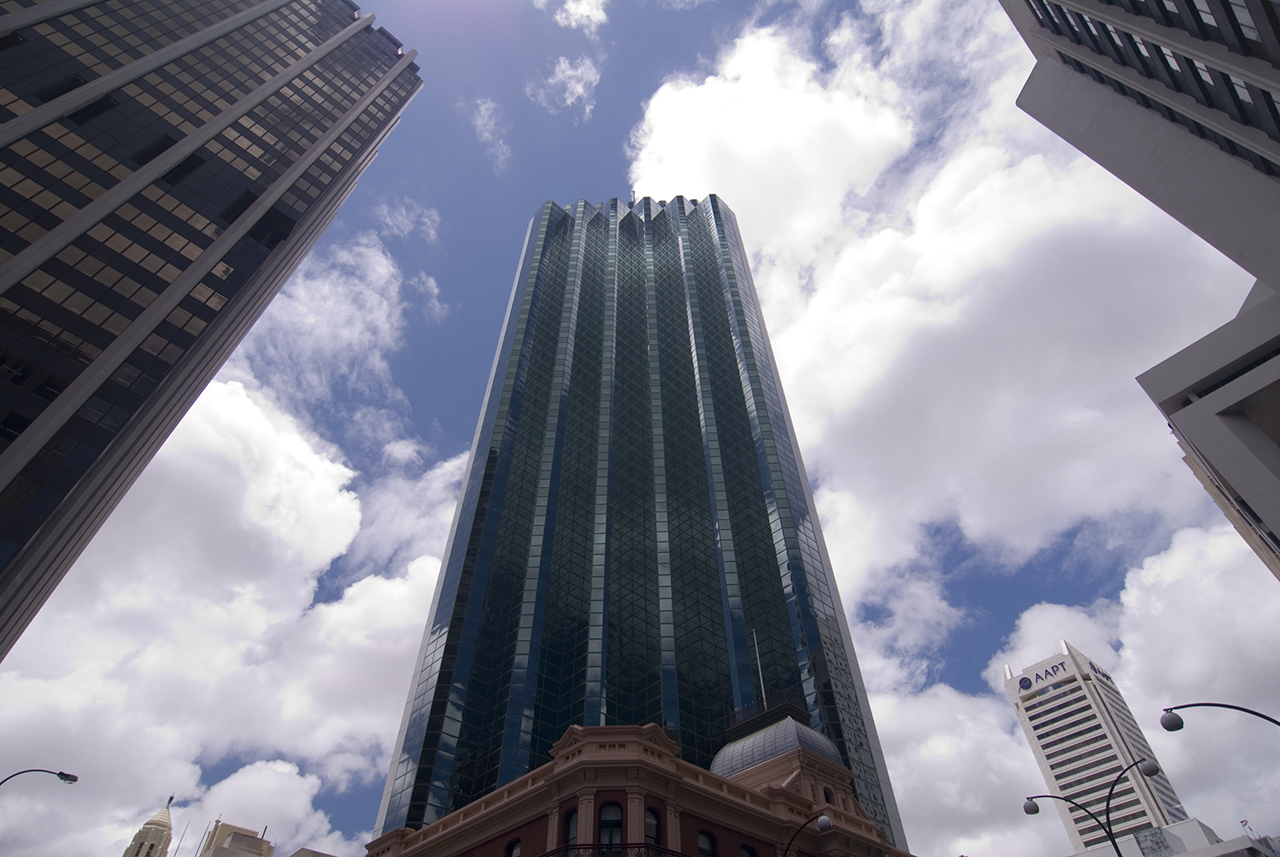
View of 108 from the corner of William Street and St Georges Terrace

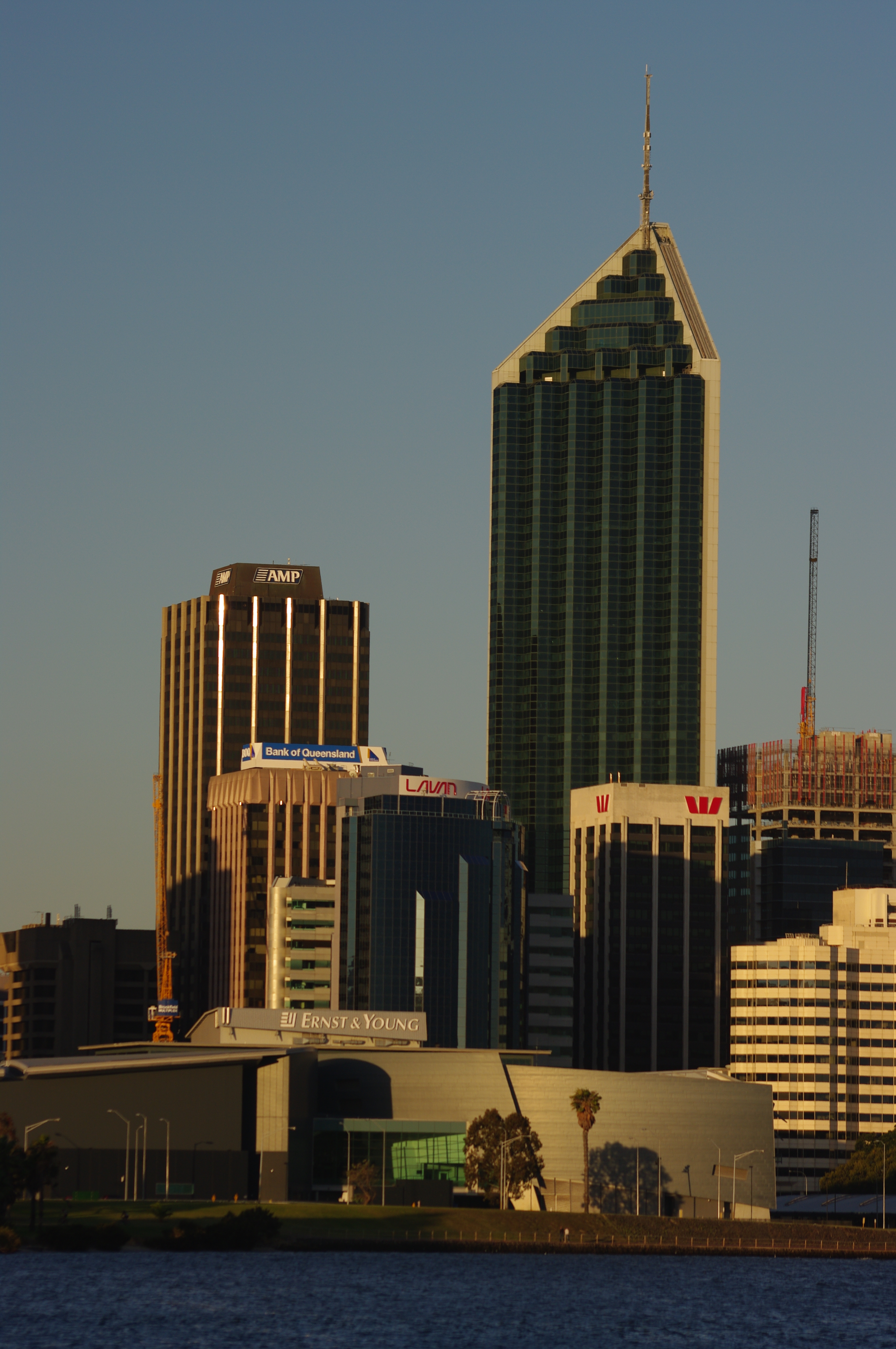
View of the tower from South Perth
