= Terrace Hotel =

Terrace Hotel, or The Terrace Hotel, may refer to:

in Australia

- St George's House, Perth, known also as Terrace Hotel

in Switzerland

  - Hotel Terrace (Engelberg), location of former Drahtseilbahn Engelberg–Hotel Terrasse.

in the United States

- Terrace Hotel (Lakeland, Florida), one of the Historic Hotels of America
