= Padbury Buildings, Perth =

Buildings in Perth, Western Australia

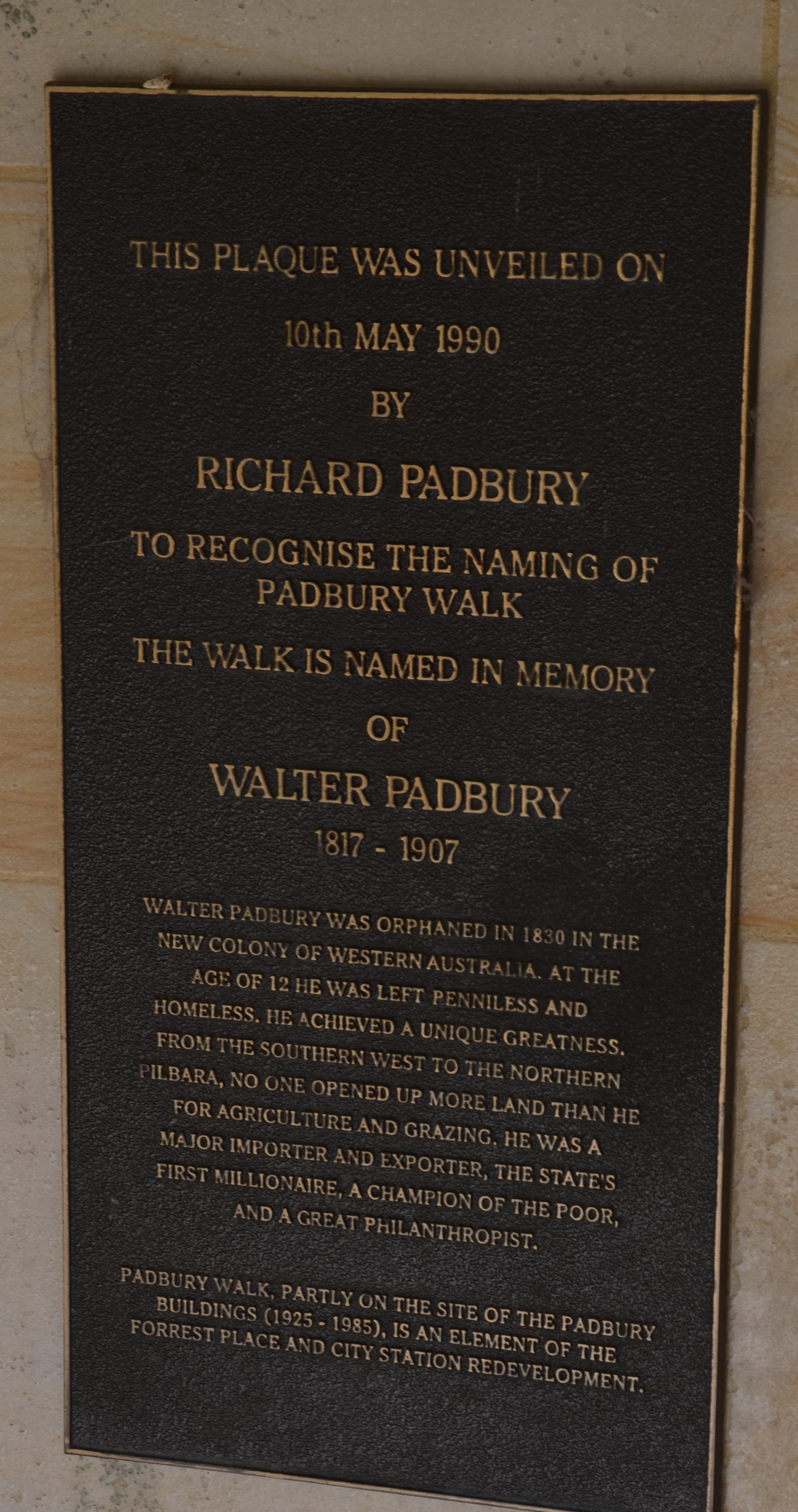
Plaque for Padbury Walk

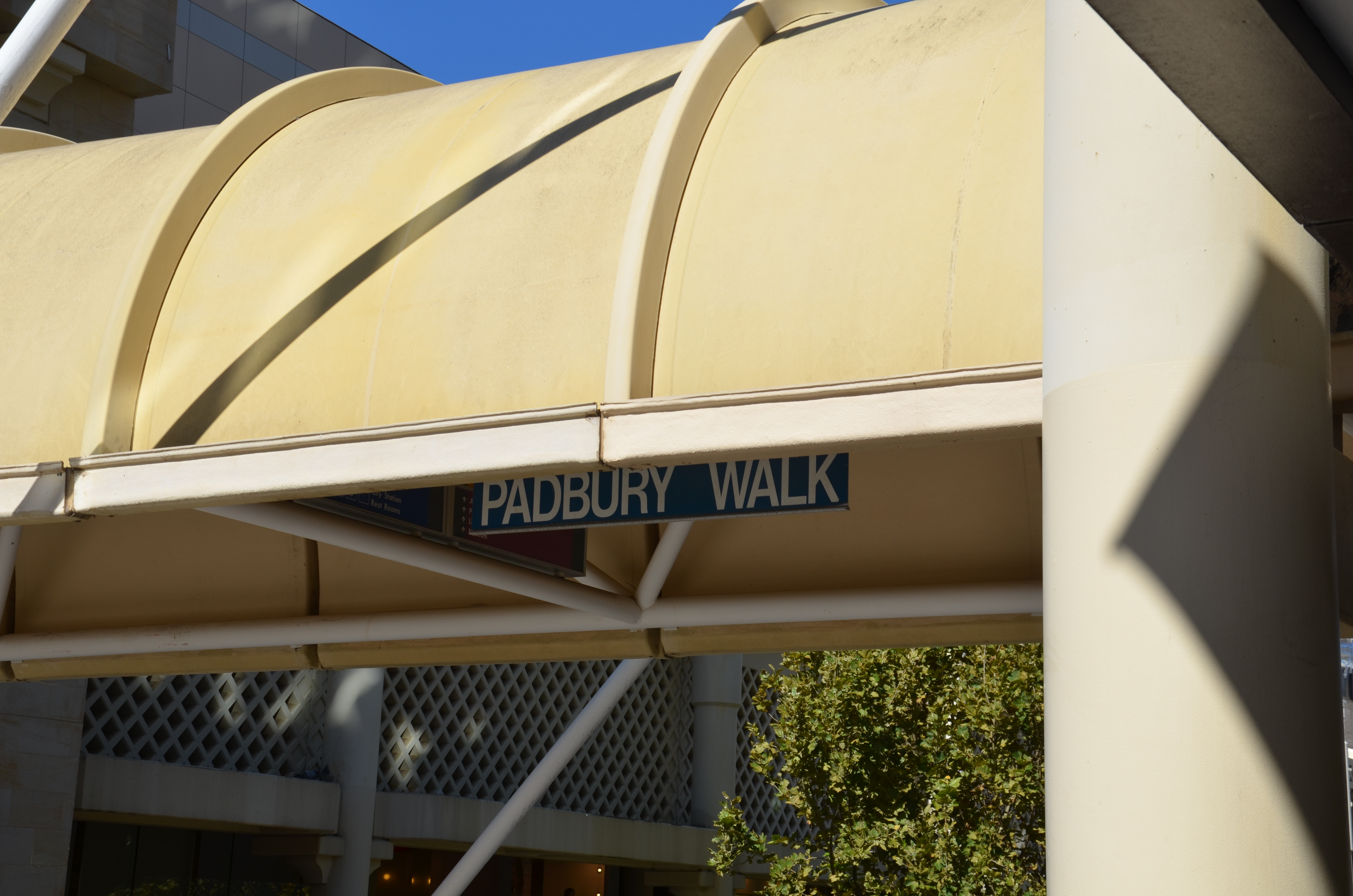
Sign for Padbury Walk

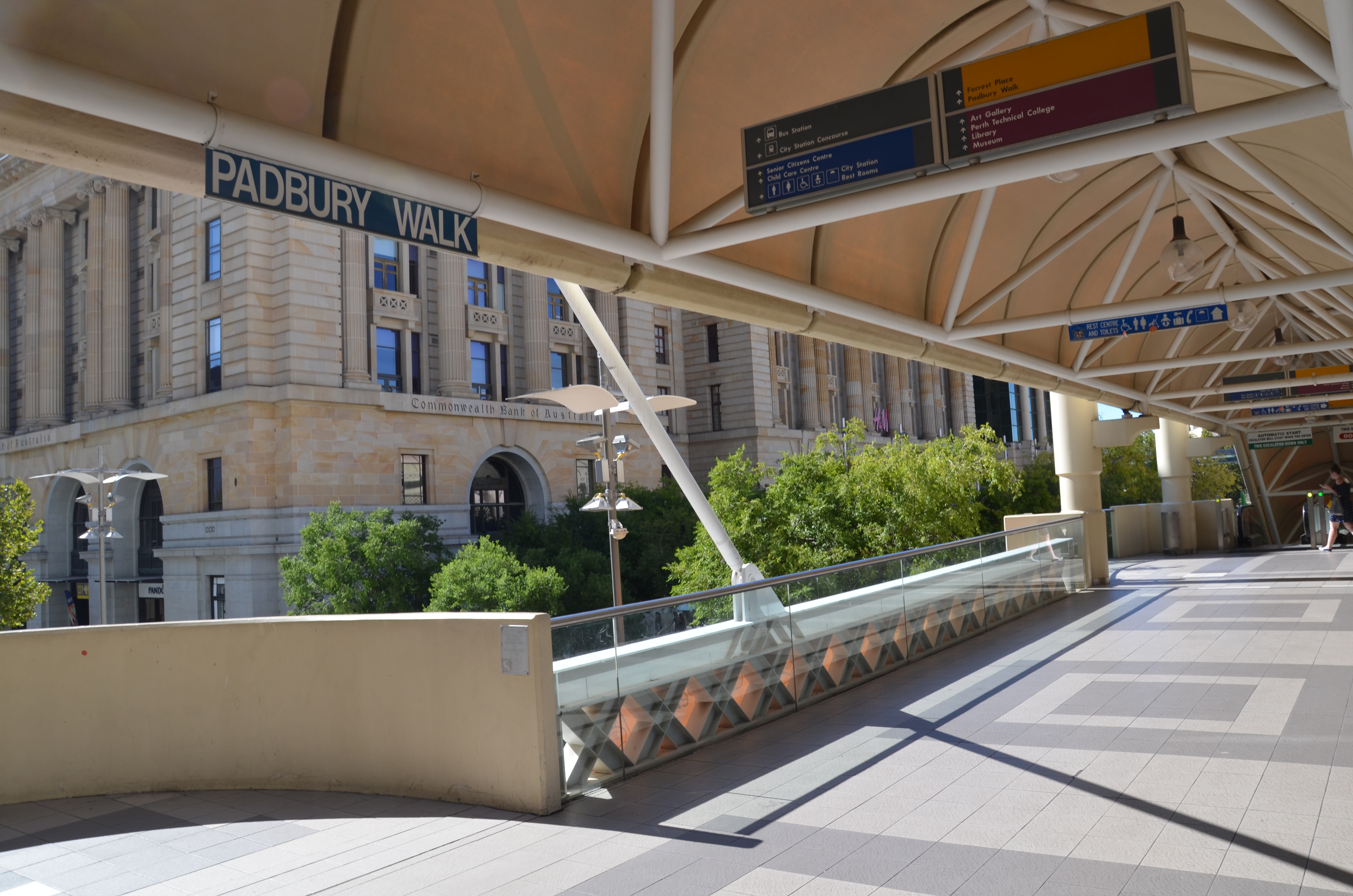
Context with Forrest Place

The Padbury Buildings was a building complex in Forrest Place in Perth, Western Australia. It was located the full length of Forrest Place between Wellington Street and Murray Street. They were constructed in 1924–1925.

It was a low set building adjacent to the higher Boans building, which later was demolished to make way for the Myer building. The city buildings housed a range of businesses, and associations with significant organisations as tenants at various stages.

They were a part of a set of buildings associated with William Padbury (nephew of Walter Padbury) in Western Australia. Due to the location on Forrest Place, it was photographed regularly throughout its history. In 1937 a series of sectional photographs were made along the Forrest Place frontage.

The buildings were demolished in 1987, in preparation for the site of the Forrest Chase complex. In 1990, the buildings and contribution of Walter Padbury were memorialised in Padbury Walk, the walkway between the Carillon City shopping centre and Forrest Chase.
