= Padbury Buildings =

Former buildings in Perth, Western Australia

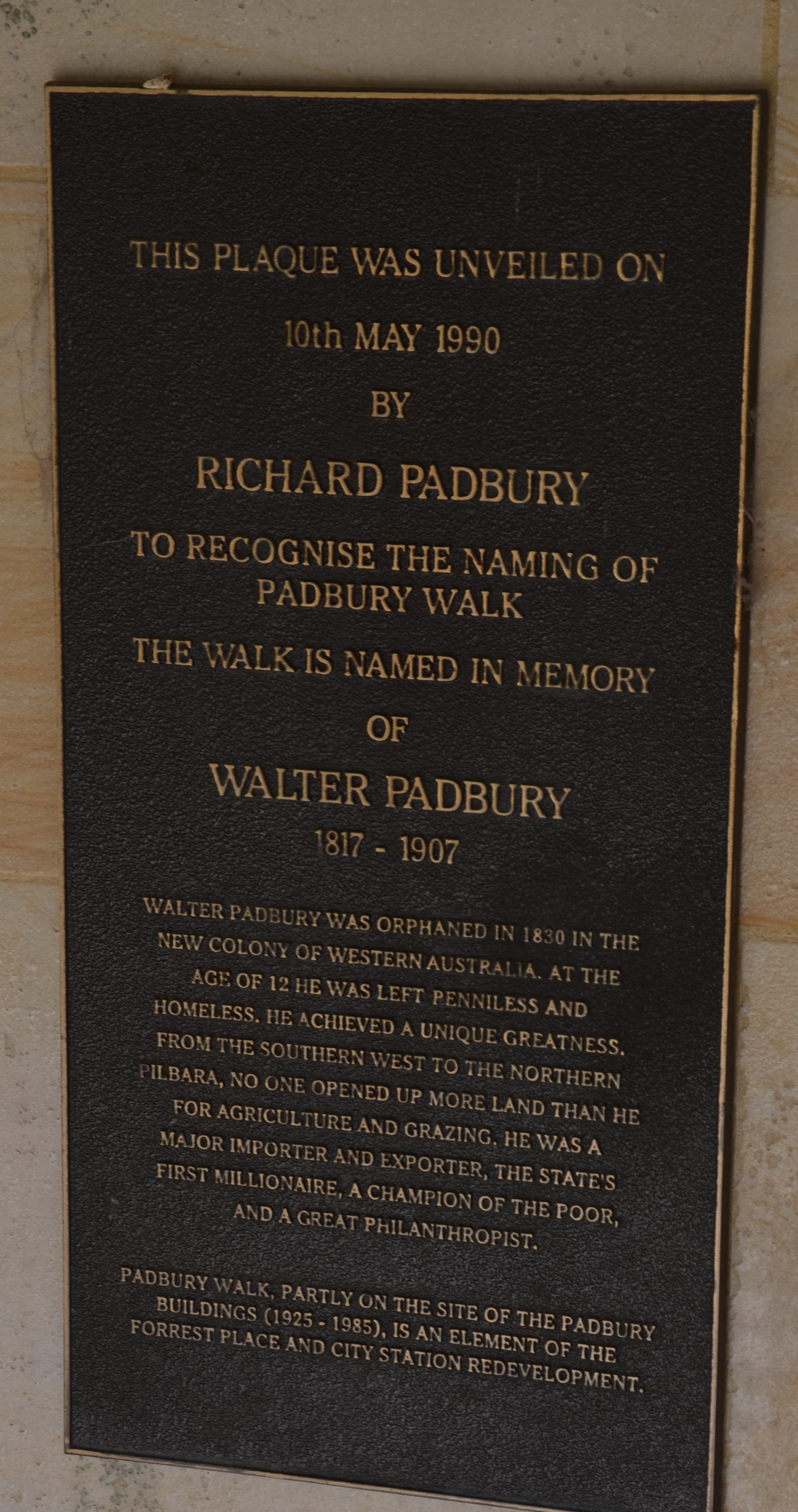
Sign at Padbury Walk in Murray Street, Perth

Padbury Buildings is the name for a range of existing and former structures found in various localities in Western Australia. The Padbury family, mainly Walter Padbury, had a range of buildings, some of which now are heritage listed.

== Buildings ==
In the Perth central business district the Padbury building was on the eastern side of Forrest Place.

In the eastern suburbs of Perth were a number of businesses and buildings in Bassendean, Guildford and Midland; (Note: At the time Midland was known as Midland Junction.) the company that ran the stores – Padbury Stores – Ltd went into liquidation due to the costs of the Forrest Place building.

In Bassendean, Padbury Buildings, also Padbury Store, were on Perth Road (now on Guildford Road) immediately across Guildford Road from the Bassendean railway station.

In East Guildford, Padbury Buildings were on Terrace Road, just east of the Rose and Crown Hotel. By 1949 the Guildford Padbury building was owned by C & C.

== Stores ==
The names of buildings and business did not necessarily have Padbury as the part of the name. The Guildford store is referred to in 1903 and 1908 as the Colonial Stores.

Padbury Stores were also opened in Moora and Toodyay.

== Padbury House ==
A number of buildings in Perth were named "Padbury House" at different times.

Part of the Saint Charles Seminary in Guildford has been known as Padbury House.

Padbury House was a building in 1929 on the corner of King Street and St Georges Terrace, Perth.

== Flour mill ==
On the Midland railway line east of Guildford and located in East Guildford, a siding had been in place for William Padbury's Peerless Flour Mill. (Note: Article about Walter Padbury suggests it was Walter, not William.)
