= 100 St Georges Terrace =

Skyscraper in Perth, Western Australia

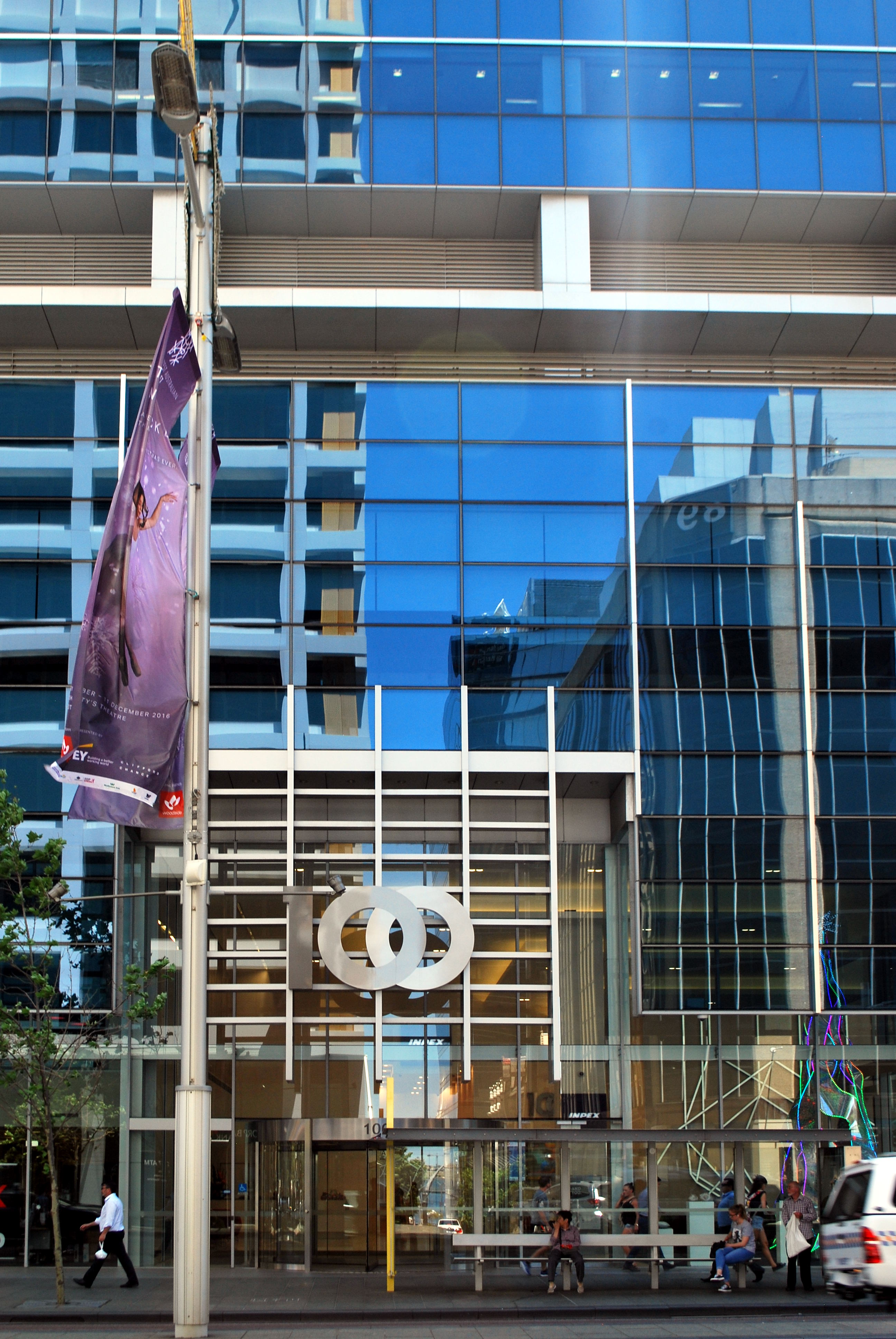
- Interactive map of the 100 St Georges Terrace area

General information
- Status: Completed
- Type: Mixed (Office/Retail)
- Location: 100 St Georges Terrace, Perth, Western Australia
- Coordinates: 31°57′16.63″S 115°51′27.13″E
- Construction started: 2006
- Completed: 2009
- Opening: June 2009; 17 years ago
- Cost: A$250M
- Owner: IFM Investors
- Operator: JLL

Height
- Roof: 103 m (337.93 ft)

Technical details
- Floor count: 24 over ground (including plant); 4 basement
- Floor area: Retail: 8,500 m^{2} (91,000 sq ft); Office: 28,000 m^{2} (300,000 sq ft)
- Lifts/elevators: 15

Design and construction
- Architect: Hames Sharley
- Developer: Pivot Group (Axiom Property) and ISPT
- Structural engineer: BPA Engineering
- Main contractor: Multiplex

100 St Georges Terrace is a 24-storey skyscraper located at 100 St Georges Terrace in Perth, Western Australia. It is a mixed retail and commercial property. The retail component, named enex perth (formerly enex100), is made up of two floors of shops and food outlets between St Georges Terrace and the Hay Street Mall. The office tower is 103 metres (338 ft) high, and the project was the first office building constructed in Perth to a 4.5-star Australian Building Greenhouse Rating.

== History ==
=== Pre-2001 ===
The St Georges Terrace side of the site was formerly occupied by several buildings. The site adjacent to Trinity Church was opened as a branch of the Union Bank of Australia in 1885. The seven-storey New Zealand Insurance Company building was constructed at 100 St Georges Terrace in 1927, followed by the neighbouring six-storey Airways House in 1933. The Union Bank merged with the Bank of Australasia in 1951 to form the ANZ Bank, and in May 1963 it vacated its building to allow for the construction of a modern replacement building on the same site. The replacement ANZ Bank was 14 storeys tall and was opened in November 1965 by Premier David Brand. The site also became home to the National Mutual Arcade.

The Hay Street side of the site was home to department store Sandovers. The original building on the site designed by architect J. Talbot Hobbs was destroyed by fire in 1907 and replaced with a new building. This remained the home of Sandovers until the company closed down late in the 20th century, and the facade remains standing to this day.

The National Mutual Arcade was demolished in early 1991, and the ANZ Bank Building was imploded on 14 July that same year. This was to make way for a A$100 million development retail arcade and 39-storey office tower, however due to a market downturn the plans never eventuated. Instead, the St Georges Terrace half of the site was landscaped into a park and the northern half saw construction of a Toys "R" Us store.

=== 2001–2008: Construction ===
In 2001, Futuris Corporation subsidiary Caversham Properties obtained a $30-million option over the site to develop an office tower. In 2002 Futuris unveiled its plans to build a $120 million, 27-storey tower on the site named Century City, and received planning approval for the development. The development would include a large shopping centre and cinema beneath the office tower. The development did not attract sufficient interest from major tenants, and Futuris' option was terminated.

After the termination of Futuris' option, an option to develop the site was taken up by Pivot Group, the private group of Incitec chairman Peter Laurance, in September 2003. At this time, the site was owned by Axa Statutory Fund, and managed by Deutsche Asset Management. On 17 December 2004, the Pivot Group exercised its option to buy the site from Axa Pacific for A$30 million. On the same day, it announced fresh redevelopment plans for the site. The development was undertaken as a joint venture between Incitec and the Industry Superannuation Property Trust (ISPT), the latter of which also owned the nearby Forrest Chase shopping centre. Upon completion, ISPT would take full ownership of the property. To facilitate the redevelopment, the properties fronting the Hay Street Mall were purchased by the Pivot Group.

Development approval was received from the City of Perth in April 2004. The project was to be the largest retail development in the Perth central business district since Forrest Chase was completed in 1989. Construction was initially expected to begin in early 2005, and the building was expected to have a value upon completion of A$140 million.

The plans included underground car park as well as a 22-bay loading dock, which was to be used by tenants of the shopping centre as well as other retailers on the Hay Street Mall. However, despite wanting such a loading dock for the mall since 1989, the City of Perth refused to invest public money in the project.

Before construction started, supermarket chain Woolworths took a 20-year lease over 2,500 square metres (27,000 sq ft) of space in the retail component of the project, out of a total of 15,000 square metres (160,000 sq ft) of total retail space.

The development was structured so that if there was insufficient demand for office space, the office tower would be scrapped in favour of a pure retail development. Due to an economic boom in Western Australia, during planning and construction the retail and office rental markets in the Perth CBD dried up, with vacancy rates falling to record lows. Despite this and rents among the lowest in the Perth office market, the developers had trouble securing an anchor tenant for the office tower portion of the development. The developers confirmed in October 2005 that the construction of the office tower would go ahead without an anchor tenant.

Existing leases over the remaining buildings fronting the Hay Street Mall expired at the end of January 2006, and demolition started in February 2006. The heritage-listed facades of these buildings were retained and incorporated into the new development. Demolition was complete by April 2006, with construction by building company Multiplex expected to get underway by July 2006. By this stage, the cost of the development had been revised to $250 million.

Axiom Properties joined the development on 27 June 2006, investing A$5 million in exchange for half of the profits of the office tower portion of the development.

The first major office tenancy was achieved in March 2007 when Inpex signed a 10-year lease of 7,000 square metres (75,000 sq ft) of space across the building's top four floors. This was followed by the National Australia Bank which took 8,900 square metres (96,000 sq ft) of space in the tower and became its anchor tenant, to enable it to shift from its current location in St Martins Centre. The bank also leased 2,000 square metres (22,000 sq ft) of retail space over two levels to open a new retail headquarters fronting St Georges Terrace, and secured signage rights to the building. Apache Energy is also a tenant. Closer to the building's completion, NOPSA leased 1,240 square metres (13,300 sq ft) of space, and engineering company KBR and subsidiary Geanherne took 5,295 square metres (56,990 sq ft) of space in the building, bringing it to 97% leased. The remaining 3% of available space was leased by Microsoft shortly after completion, relocating from QV1.

During construction, ISPT acquired Axiom Properties' share of the project and renamed it from "Century City" to "100 St Georges Terrace", with the retail component called "enex100". The rationale for this change was to reflect a more modern image, with the former name considered "too conservative". The name "enex100" is apparently derived from the slogan "enjoy and expect the unexpected". The name has since been changed to "enex perth".

=== 2008–2022 ===
The initial stage of the retail project, made up of shops fronting the Hay Street Mall, opened in mid-December 2008. The second stage of the retail centre was made up of the Woolworths supermarket, JB Hi-Fi and an upmarket food court on the podium level. Woolworths was opened on 8 June 2009, and was the chain's 800th store in Australia. The remainder of the complex was officially opened by Perth MLA John Hyde.

In December 2009, Greenhouse opened at the front of the complex on St Georges Terrace. Designed by Joost Bakker, the building was built entirely of recycled and/or recyclable materials and was constructed over a 14-day period by a team of workers. The exterior walls of the restaurant were covered with approximately 4,000 strawberry plants, with the internal walls made of plywood and insulated with 420 straw bales. The rooftop bar was also home to a produce garden and worm farm. It closed in May 2017. It was replaced with Humble Onion, which opened in March 2021, however their tenure was short-lived and they closed permanently in December 2021.

=== 2023–present: Refurbishment ===
In November 2023, ISPT announced an A$40 million refurbishment of the retail space and office tower. Under the proposal, the ground floor (Hay Street) level would be converted into a 130-seat communal lounge room, and a 260-seat canteen with several eateries. The existing food court and retail space on Level 3 would close, and be converted into office space to serve as the new headquarters for base metals and mining company South32, who would relocate from its existing space at 108 St Georges Terrace. The redevelopment, designed by Woods Bagot, began in late 2023 and was completed in July 2025.

== Design ==
It was designed by architects Hames Sharley, who were also responsible for the design of the Swan Bells bell tower. The complex is made up of an office tower fronting St Georges Terrace with 19 storeys of offices, and four plant floor levels rising above three levels of retail between the Hay Street Mall and the Terrace. A further four basement floors contain tenant parking and building services. The design of the shopping centre was modelled around suburban shopping centres such as Chadstone Shopping Centre in Melbourne and Chatswood Chase in Sydney, rather than based upon traditional CBD arcade layouts.

Before commencing construction, the developers committed to achieving a 4.5-star Australian Building Greenhouse Rating for the project. This added 10% to the cost of the building, and the developers indicated that achieving a 5-star rating would be prohibitively expensive.

Floor plates in the office building are 1,765 square metres (19,000 sq ft) in area, and are described by the management as virtually "column-free" and with "high windows". There is a total of 31,300 square metres (337,000 sq ft) of net lettable office space in the development.
