= Forrest Chase =

Shopping complex in Perth, Western Australia

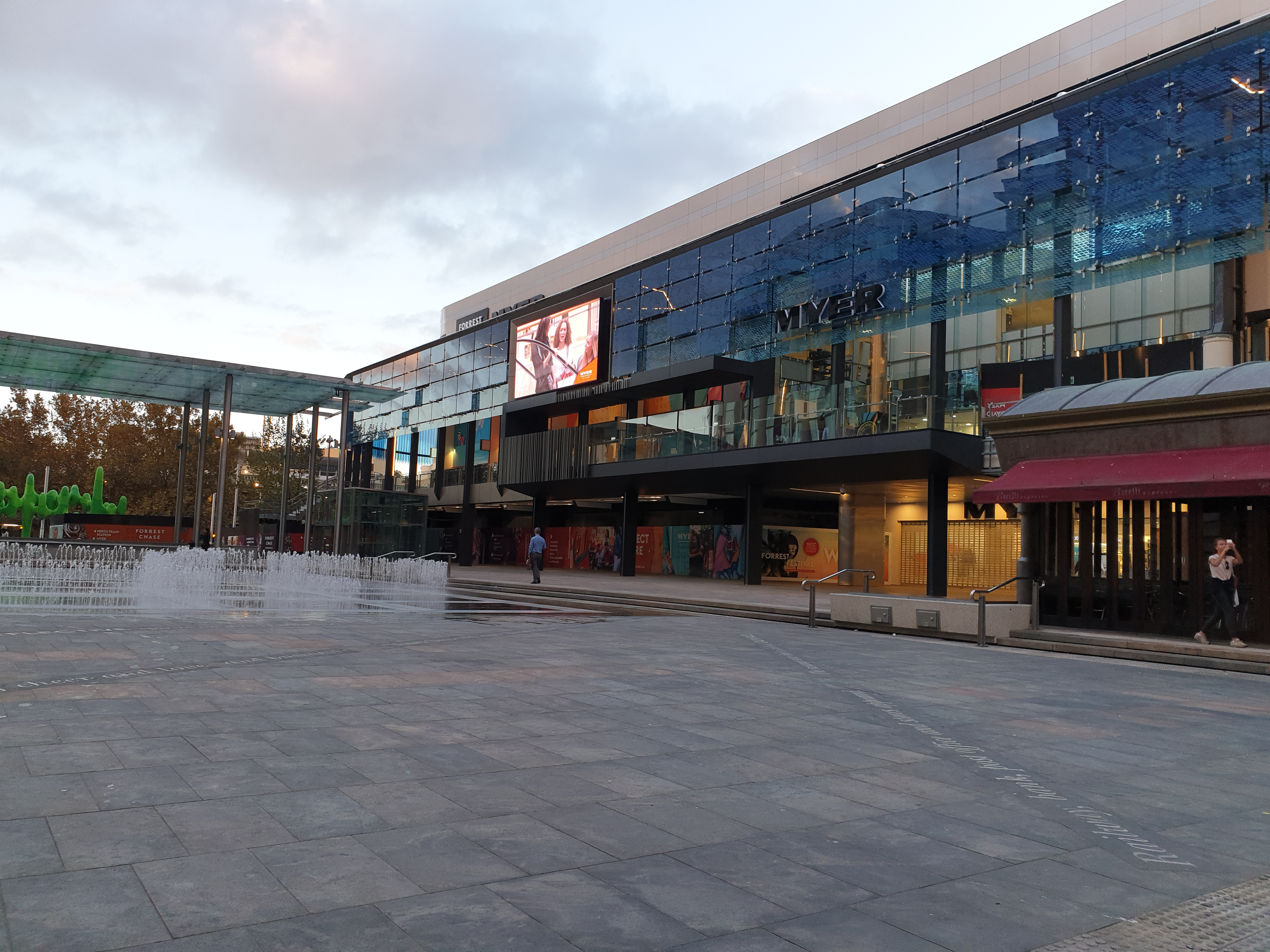
- Location: Perth, Western Australia, Australia
- Coordinates: 31°57′09″S 115°51′36″E
- Manager: Jones Lang LaSalle
- Owner: IFM Investors
- Num. of stores: 29
- Num. of anchor tenants: 2
- Floor area: 42,005 m^{2} (452,140 sq ft)
- Website: forrestchase.com.au

Forrest Chase is a major shopping centre in Perth, Western Australia located in Forrest Place.

A Myer store serves as its main anchor and largest tenant. As of September 2026 the centre also contains a Woolworths supermarket, a JB Hi-Fi outlet, a Strike Bowling Bar and other smaller shops and businesses. The western portion of the structure sits on the site of the former Padbury Buildings on the eastern side of Forrest Place. The site also formerly contained the Perth Boans department store before it made way for the current centre in 1986. The centre was redeveloped between 2017 and 2019.

== Transport ==
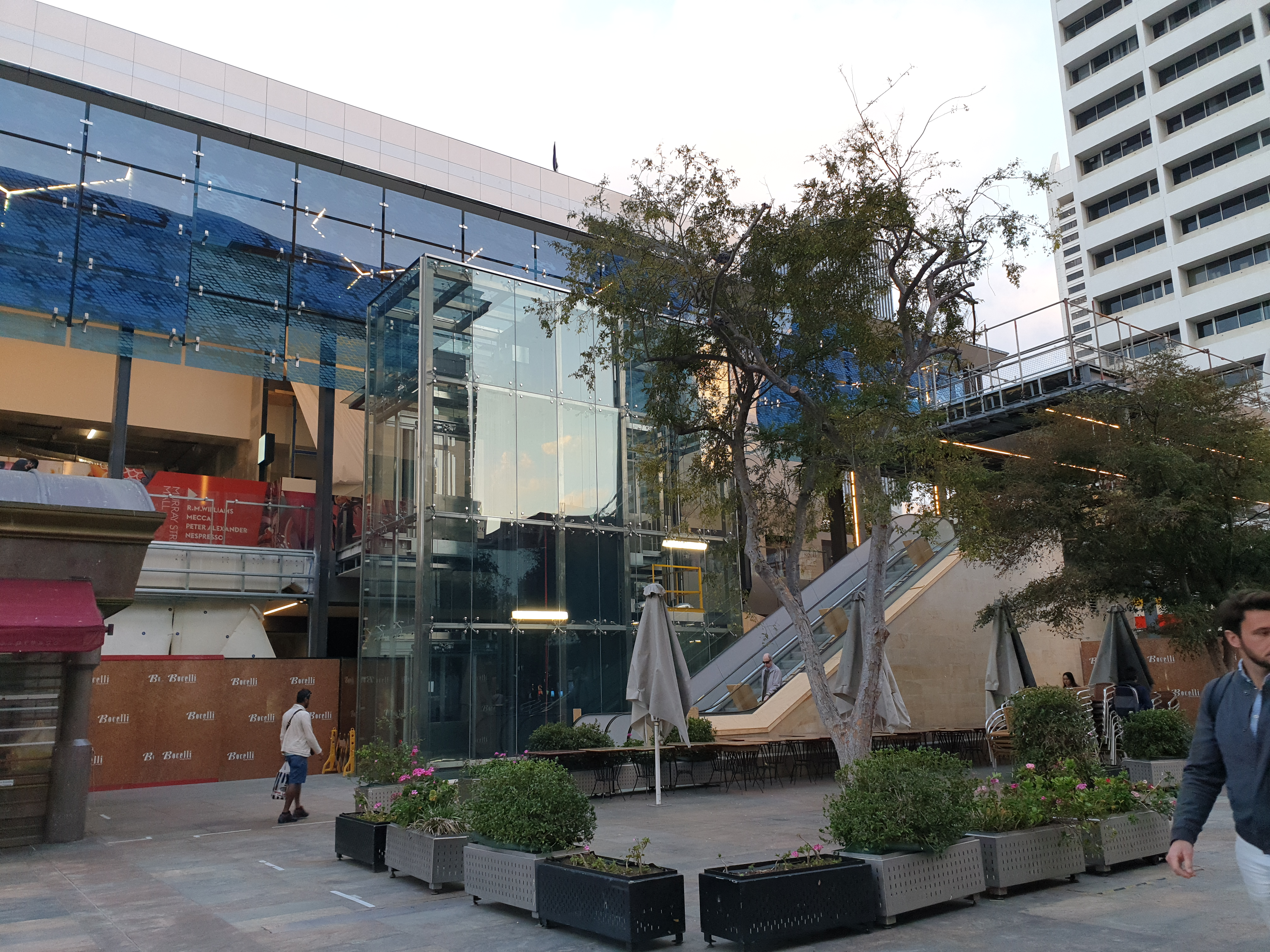
Forrest Chase during redevelopment

The centre connects with major pedestrian malls such as Carillon City via elevated walkways. There is no direct vehicular transport to the location, although Wellington Street comes the closest. However, the area is well served by bus links along St Georges Terrace, as well as services from the Perth Busport and Elizabeth Quay Bus Station. Rail services are available from the nearby Perth railway station.
