= Greenhouse (restaurant) =

Former bar and restaurant in Perth, Western Australia

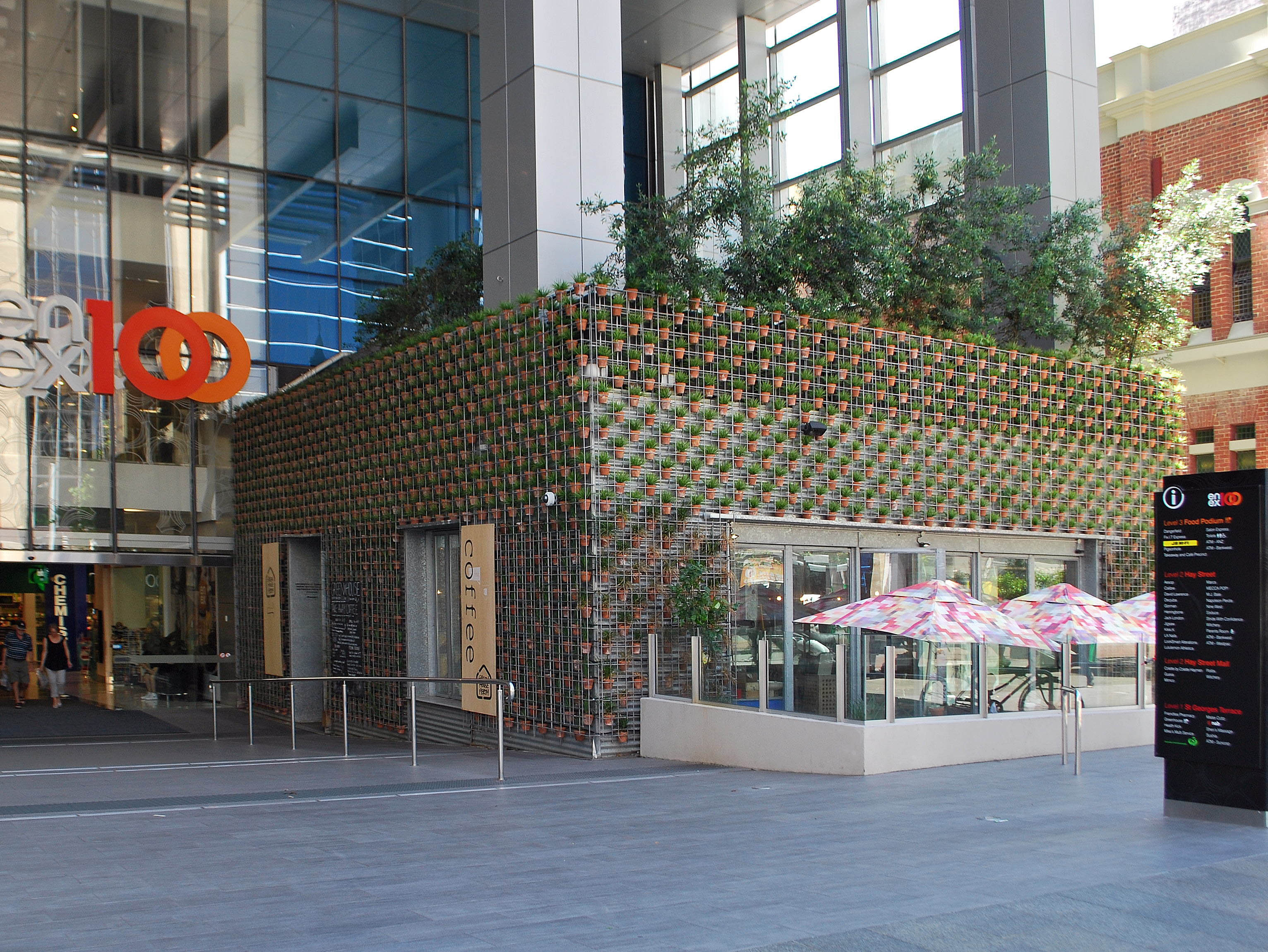
- Interactive map of Greenhouse

Restaurant information
- Established: 2009; 17 years ago
- Closed: 2017; 9 years ago
- Head chef: Matt Stone
- Food type: Modern Australian
- Location: 100 St Georges Terrace, Perth, Western Australia, 6000, Australia
- Coordinates: 31°57′17″S 115°51′27″E

Greenhouse was an eco-friendly bar and restaurant at 100 St Georges Terrace in Perth, Western Australia. With a concept that included being well designed and completely waste free, the restaurant featured a vegetable garden on the roof, a zero-carbon footprint, and ground its own organic flour. Designed by Dutch-born florist, artist, builder and environmentalist Joost Bakker, Greenhouse opened in 2009 and closed in 2017.

== History ==
Both head chef Matt Stone and the restaurant won a number of awards. In 2010, Stone was named Best New Talent at the national Gourmet Traveller Awards; awarded Young Chef of the Year by The West Australian Good Food Guide in 2011 and 2012. The restaurant was given a one star rating, and the award for Best New Restaurant of the Year, by The West Australian Good Food Guide 2011, and retained its one star rating for 2012 and 2013, but lost that rating for 2014.

The Greenhouse concept was built upon at Federation Square in Melbourne in 2008–09, at Sydney Harbour in 2011, and at the Melbourne Food and Wine Festival in 2012. Greenhouse featured in an episode of MasterChef Australia series 5 in 2013.

The restaurant was sold to Red Rock Leisure in partnership with chef Chris Taylor around 2012, before closing in May 2017 due in part to decreased revenue and high operating costs.

== See also ==
- Australian cuisine
- Western Australian wine
