= Mill Street, Perth, Western Australia =

Street in Perth, Western Australia

Mill Street, Perth Western Australia
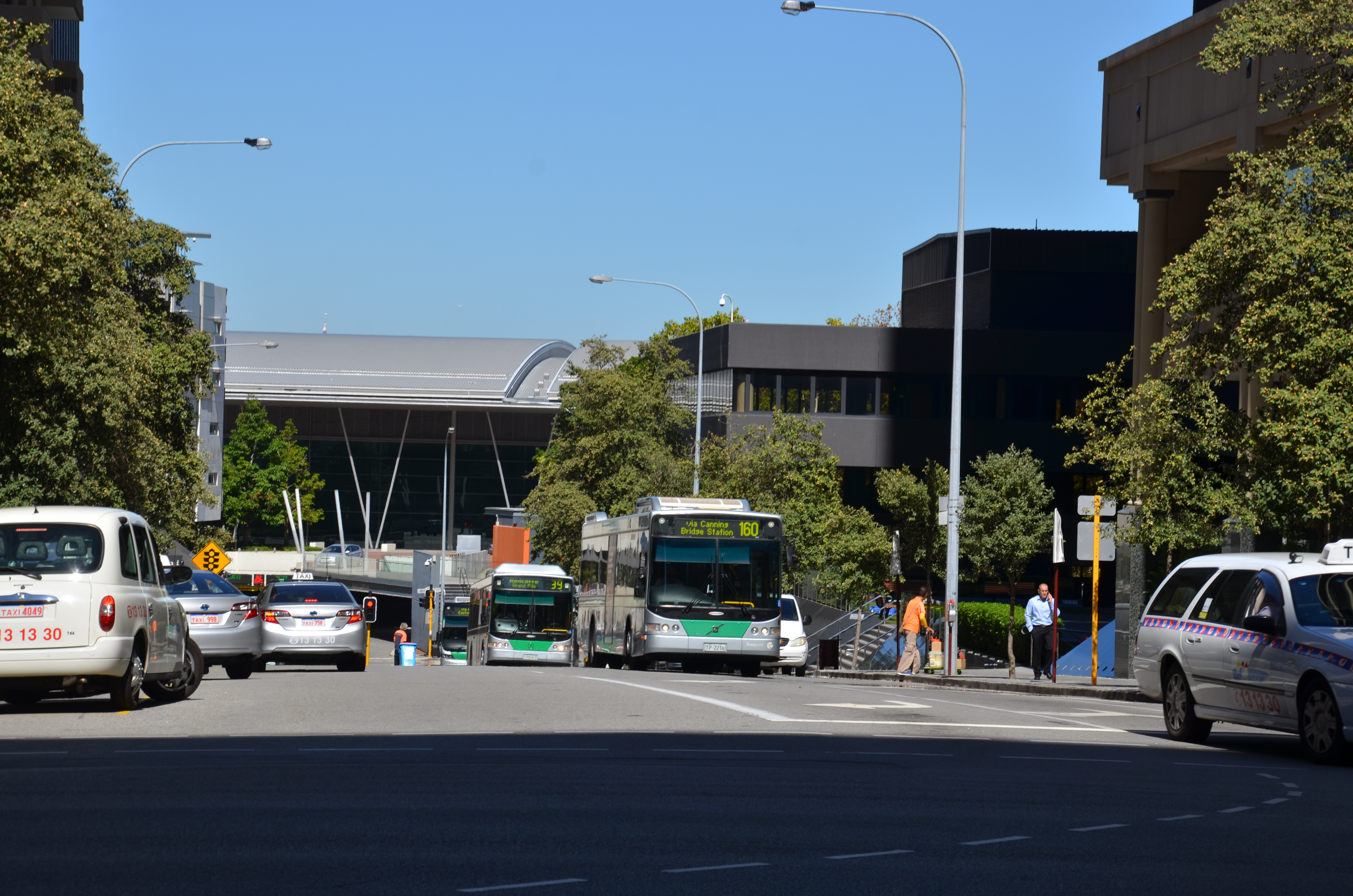
- Mill Street, with buses about to turn into St Georges Terrace. The Perth Convention Centre building is at the rear.

General information
- Type: Street
- Length: 190 m (600 ft)

Major junctions
- North end: St Georges Terrace
- South end: Mounts Bay Road

Location(s)
- Suburb(s): Perth

Mill Street is a short street at the western end of the central business district (CBD) of Perth, Western Australia. It runs between St Georges Terrace and Mounts Bay Road.

== History ==
The street was named after a mill built in 1833 by Samuel Kingsford. Its name appears for the first time on maps of the Land Department in 1859.

Prior to extensive landfill since the 1950s, the street ended close to the Swan River. As late as 1845 the southern end reached the river. It is now separated from Perth Water by a hotel, the Perth Convention Centre, on and off ramps for the Mitchell Freeway, and Riverside Drive.

In the 1890s it was the site of a brewery and jetty.

In the 1930s the Australian Broadcasting Commission was considering developing a property to house its Perth base for broadcasting.

Mill Street is the main connection for buses leaving the Elizabeth Quay Bus Station, and moving along St Georges Terrace before leaving the CBD. On the corner of Mill Street and St Georges Terrace, number 191 was known as Hamersley House and for a short time the tallest building in Perth; it is now known as Parmelia House.

It is the location of the Parmelia Hilton hotel, where a significant number of conferences and events have been reported and published as being conducted in Mill Street.

== Intersections ==
LGA	Location	km	mi	Destinations	Notes
Perth	Perth	0	0.0	St Georges Terrace	Traffic light controlled
Perth	Perth	0.19	0.12	Mounts Bay Road	Traffic light controlled; no right turn from Mounts Bay Road westbound to Mill Street; Mill Street continues south as Perth Convention Centre and Elizabeth Quay Bus Station access
1.000 mi = 1.609 km; 1.000 km = 0.621 mi: Incomplete access
