= James Angus (artist) =

Artist from Perth, Western Australia

James Angus (born 1970) is an Australian artist. He is known for "his engaging and rigorously crafted sculptures", and large-scale sculptures that often explore geometry, architecture, and the distortion of familiar objects. Grow Your Own is among his most recognised public artworks.

== Life and career ==
James Angus was born in Perth, Western Australia in 1970. He attended Scarborough Senior High School. He holds a degree in Fine Arts from Curtin University of Technology and a Master of Fine Arts (Sculpture) from Yale University School of Art. He has also lectured at University of Technology Sydney. The first exhibition of Angus' work was at Sydney's Museum of Contemporary Art in 1992. He left Perth in 1996.

== Selected grants and awards ==
Angus has received the following awards:

- Fulbright Postgraduate Award, 1996
- Yale University Travelling Fellowship, 1998
- Australia Council Professional Development Grant, 1998 and 2001
- Studio residency, Cite des Arts, Paris, 2003
- Short listed for National Sculpture Prize, National Gallery of Australia, 2005
- Basil Sellers Art Prize, Melbourne; 2008
- Australia Council Fellowship, 2009

== Exhibitions ==
He has exhibited at institutions such as:

- Museum of Contemporary Art, Sydney
- Art Gallery of Western Australia, Perth
- Art Gallery of South Australia, Adelaide
- Perth Institute of Contemporary Arts, Perth
- Museum of Contemporary Art, Chicago
- Monash University Art Gallery, Melbourne
- National Gallery of Victoria, Melbourne
- Nationalgalerie im Hamburger Bahnhof, Berlin
- Art Gallery of New South Wales, Sydney
- National Gallery of Australia, Canberra
- Musee d'Art Contemporain, Lyon, France
- Heide Museum of Modern Art, Melbourne

== Public collections ==
Angus' works are included in public and private collections including:

- Museum of Contemporary Art, Chicago
- National Gallery of Australia, Canberra
- Museum of Contemporary Art, Sydney
- Art Gallery of Western Australia, Perth
- Art Gallery of South Australia, Adelaide
- Museum of Old and New Art, Hobart
- Monash University Gallery, Monash
- Austcorp, Sydney
- Murdoch University Art Collection, Perth
- Auckland Art Gallery, Auckland
- Newcastle Regional Art Gallery, Newcastle

== Public commissions ==
Angus' public commissions include:

- Day in Day Out, 1 Bligh Street, Sydney, 2011
- Grow Your Own (nicknamed the Cactus), Forrest Place, Perth, 2010, which the artist's website states is the single largest art commission undertaken in Western Australia.
- Lycee Ferdinand Buisson, Voiron, France, 2009
- Geo Face Distributor, National Portrait Gallery, Canberra, 2009
- Ellipsoidal Freeway Sculpture, Eastlink Freeway, Connect East, Melbourne, 2008
- Wave Machine, Sydney Theatre Company, Sydney, 2005
- Public Art Fund, New York, 1999
