= Grow Your Own (sculpture) =

Public sculpture in Perth, Western Australia

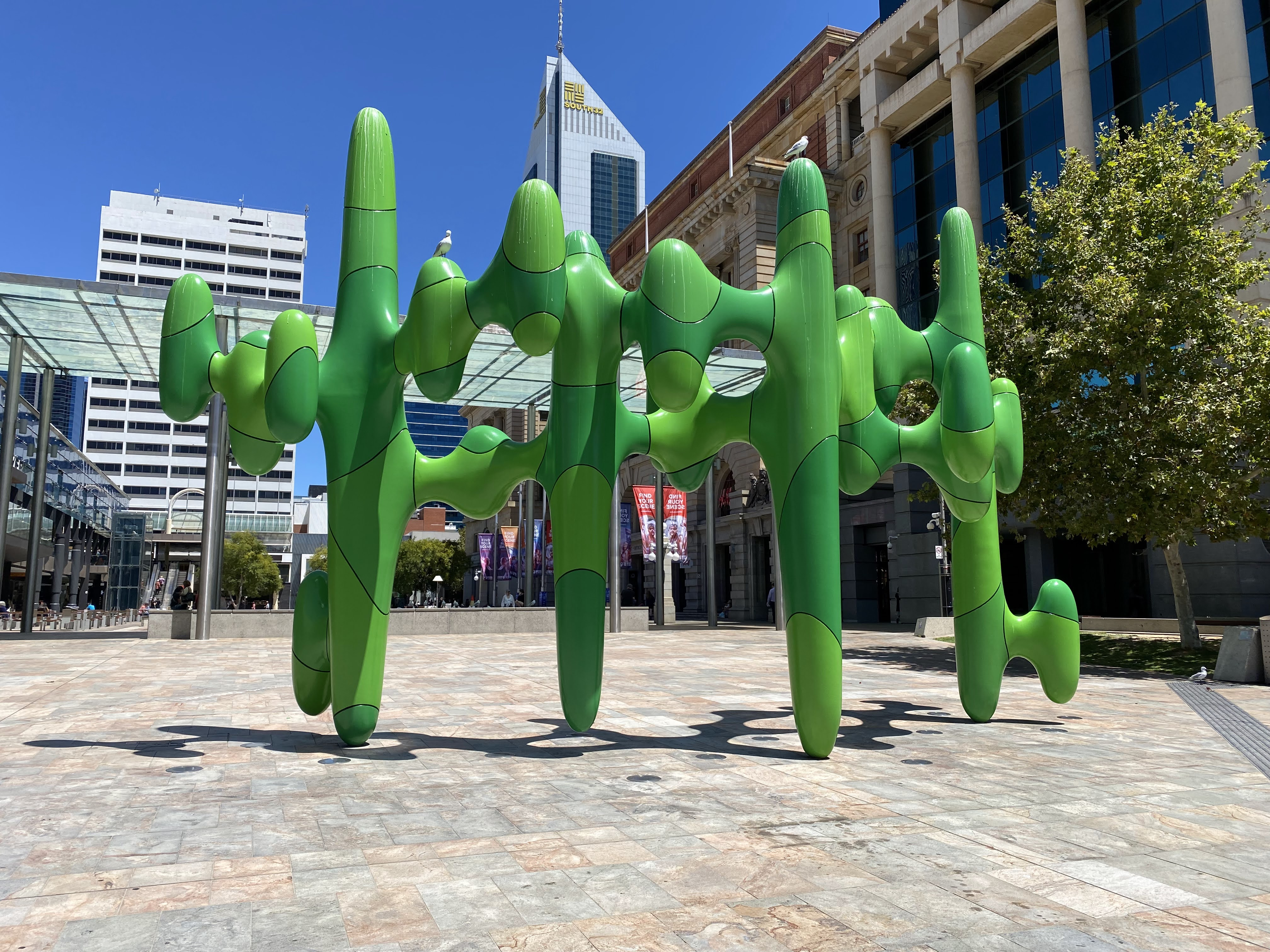
- Grow Your Own looking south from Wellington Street
- Artist: James Angus
- Year: 2011
- Medium: Aluminium, steel, enamel
- Location: Perth, Western Australia; 31.951866°S 115.859578°E

Grow Your Own is a public sculpture situated in Forrest Place, located in the central business district (CBD) of Perth, Western Australia. Created by artist James Angus and unveiled in 2011, the sculpture is notable for its large scale, bright green colour, and abstract form. It has become a landmark and meeting place, and is colloquially referred to as the Cactus due to its resemblance to a stylised plant.

== Description and history ==
The sculpture stands at approximately 6.5 metres (21 ft) tall, 11 metres (36 ft) long and 3 metres (10 ft) wide. It is made from hollow-cast aluminium, steel, and painted in industrial-grade enamel.

The sculpture is inspired by the grow-your-own organic farming movement of the early 20th century which coincided with the beginnings of Modernist sculpture. Angus wanted the sculpture to interact with its surroundings saying "There are all these viewing angles where you map the shape of the sculpture against the city that has already been built. It is sort of like a template for the future but also something that looked like it came from the past."

The sculpture was commissioned by the City of Perth and the Government of Western Australia as part of a broader public art initiative. It was selected by a jury in 2009 from over 200 international submissions and, at the time, represented the largest public art commission undertaken in the state. Fabrication of the sculpture took about a year. At the time, it cost approximately A$1 million, equivalent to A$1.3 million in 2022.

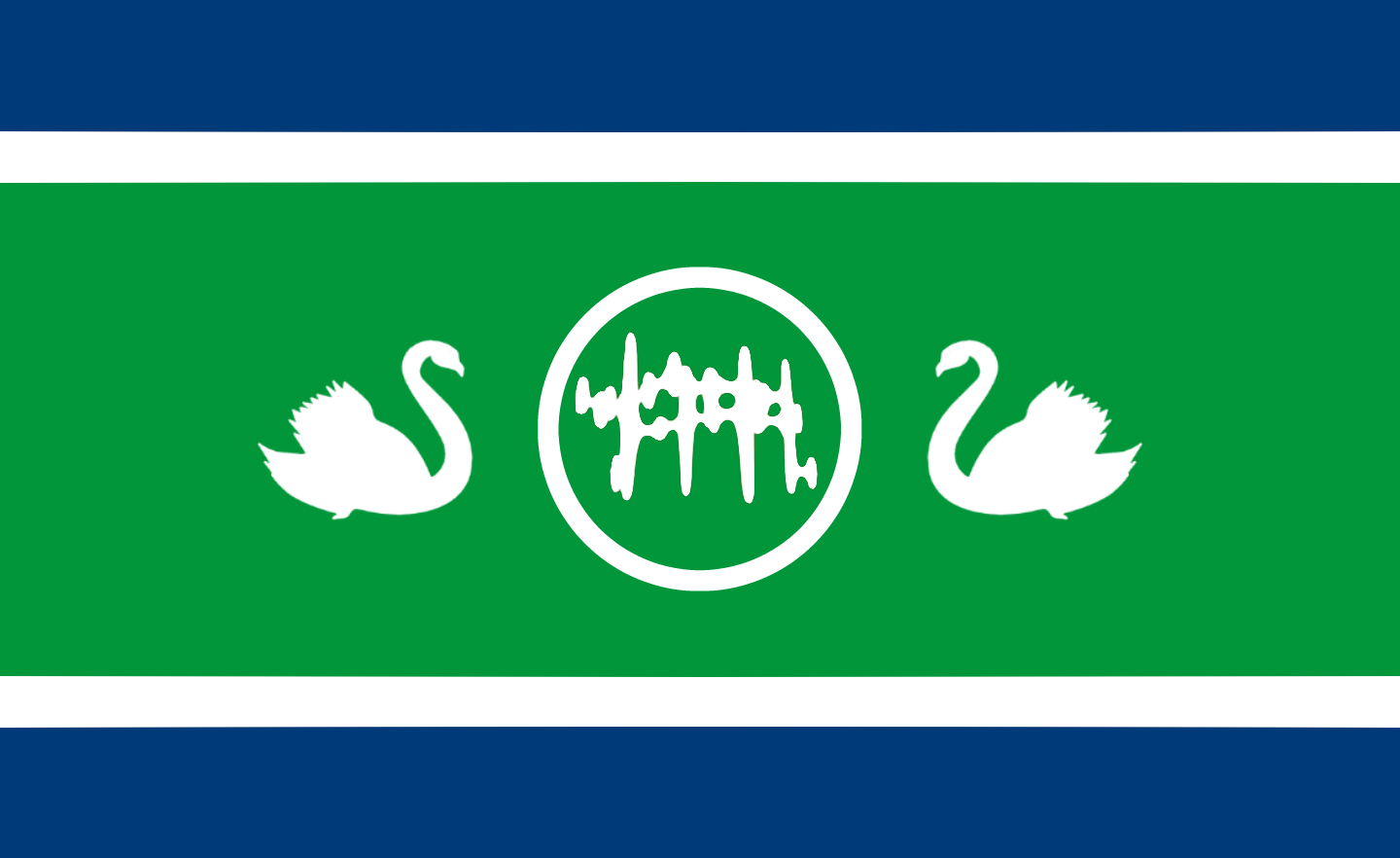
Flag designed for "Worship the Cactus" 2026

On 18 April 2026, a "Worship the Cactus" event drew thousands to the Grow Your Own sculpture "to 'hail the great cactus' in a bizarre display of devotion to the CBD sculpture." Evolving as a social media trend over the fortnight prior to 18 April, with some "teens and young adults congregating at [... the] artwork and worshipping the lime green icon" during that time, the event went ahead despite being cancelled. Bradley Innes, organiser of the event, later expressed hope that the "Worship the Cactus" celebration could become an official, annual event with the City of Perth's co-operation.

== Reception ==
Since its installation, Grow Your Own has received mixed reactions from the public and media. In 2023, there were talks about the sculpture being moved to make way for a Forrest Place redevelopment.

== See also ==
- List of public art in Western Australia
