= Cathedral Avenue =

Road in Perth, Western Australia

Coordinates: 31.9555°S 115.8608°E

Cathedral Avenue, Perth Western Australia

General information
- Type: Street
- Length: 140 m (500 ft)

Major junctions
- South end: St Georges Terrace
- North end: Hay Street

Location(s)
- Suburb(s): Perth

Cathedral Avenue is a short lane situated in Perth between St Georges Terrace and Hay Street east of Barrack Street within the Cathedral Square precinct.

Sometimes it was shown as St George's Avenue. Cathedral Avenue operates as an access route to both the Treasury Buildings and to St George's Cathedral for formal functions.

== History ==
Changes in the buildings along the course of the lane have revealed a range of significant buildings in the city centre.

The Hay Street end was gated in the late 1920s. Parking in the street was regularly a problem. Drunk and disorderly behaviour was an issue over time in the street.

== Intersections ==
LGA	Location	km	mi	Destinations	Notes
Perth	Perth	0	0.0	St Georges Terrace	
Perth	Perth	0.14	0.087	Hay Street	
1.000 mi = 1.609 km; 1.000 km = 0.621 mi
