= Drahtseilbahn Engelberg–Hotel Terrasse =

Former funicular railway in Engelberg, Switzerland

Drahtseilbahn Engelberg-Hotel Terrasse
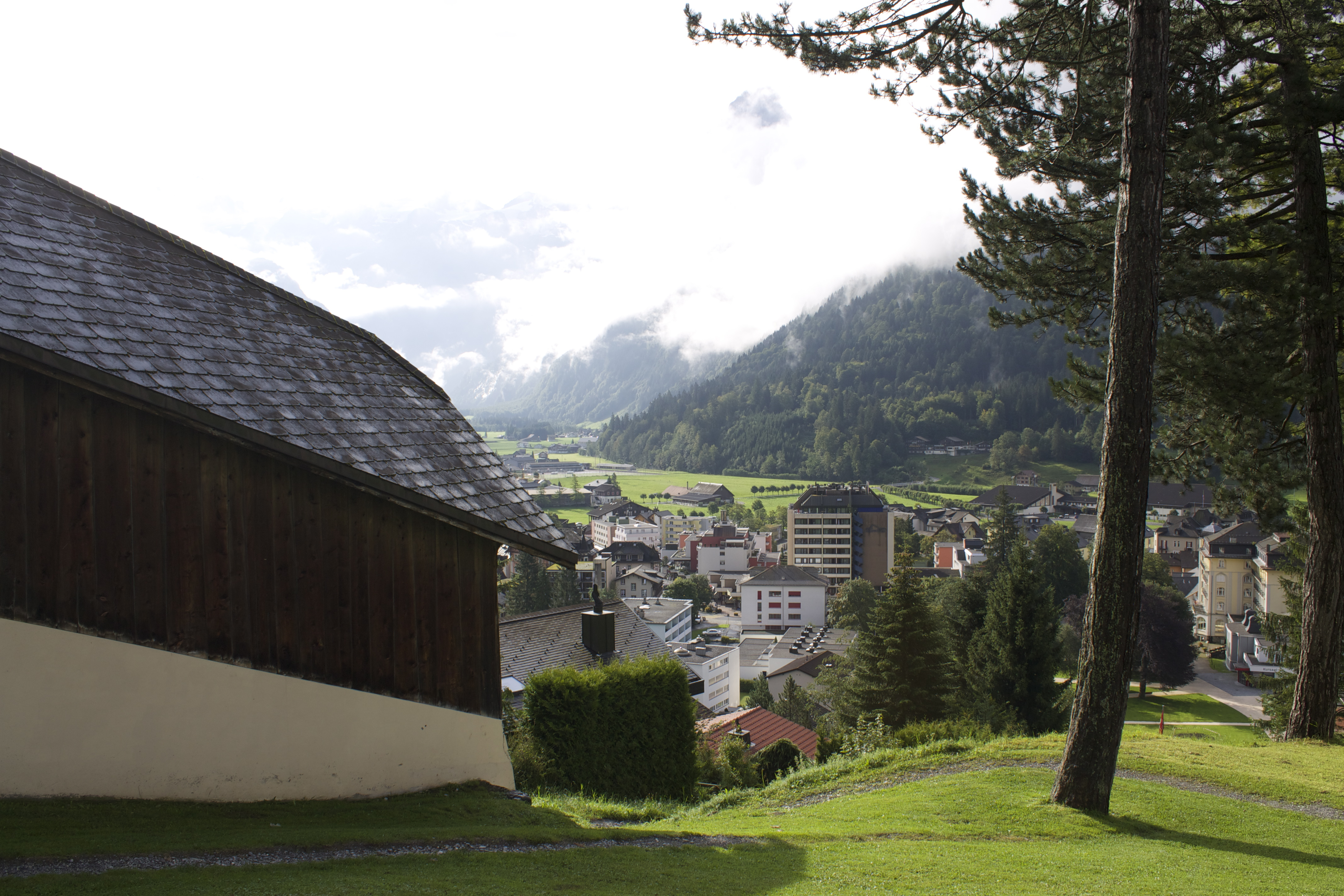
- former upper station with Engelberg in the background (2014)

Overview
- Other name(s): Standseilbahn Engelberg-Hotel Terrace; Hotelbahn Terrasse
- Status: ceased operation
- Owner: Bergbahnen Engelberg-Trübsee-Titlis AG (short: Titlis Bergbahnen, in 2008); G. Fassbind (in 1905)
- Locale: Engelberg, Switzerland
- Termini: Engelberg; "Hotel Terrace"
- Stations: 2

Service
- Type: Funicular
- Operator(s): Hotel Terrace
- Rolling stock: 2 for 12 passengers (2008); 2 for 24 passengers (1905)

History
- Opened: 30 August 1905
- Concession: 1905
- Service suspended: 1941
- Service suspended: 1993–1998
- Closed: 2008; 17 years ago

Technical
- Line length: 136 m (446 ft)
- Number of tracks: 1 with passing loop
- Track gauge: 1,000 mm (3 ft 3 3/8 in)
- Electrification: from opening
- Highest elevation: 1,053 m (3,455 ft)
- Maximum incline: 37.2%

Drahtseilbahn Engelberg-Hotel Terrasse was a funicular railway in Engelberg, Switzerland. It led from the resort Engelberg at 1003 m to Hotel Terrace at 1053 m. The two-car line with passing loop had a length of 136 m and a maximum incline of 37.2%. It was one of the funiculars built at Belle Epoque hotels.

The owner of Grand Hôtel Terrasse received a concession by the Swiss Federal Assembly in 1905. It had an initial duration of 80 years. It opened on 30 August 1905.

The service was suspended in 1941, and from 1993 to 1998.

The funicular was finally closed in 2008, when the concession expired and the installations would have required investment for renewal. Elevators and tunnels replaced it.

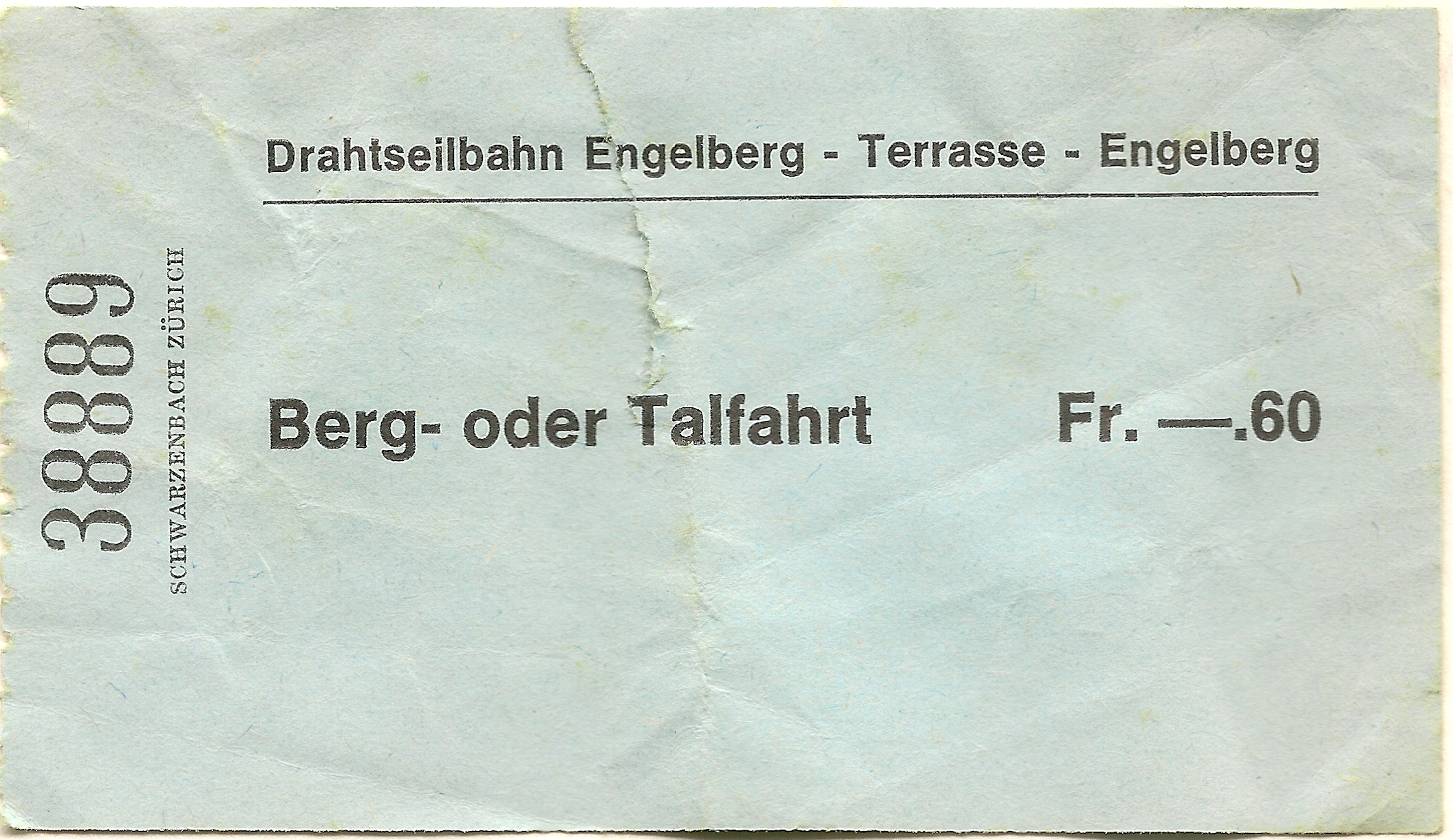
ticket (ca. 1977)
