= Forrest Place =

Pedestrianised square in Perth, Western Australia

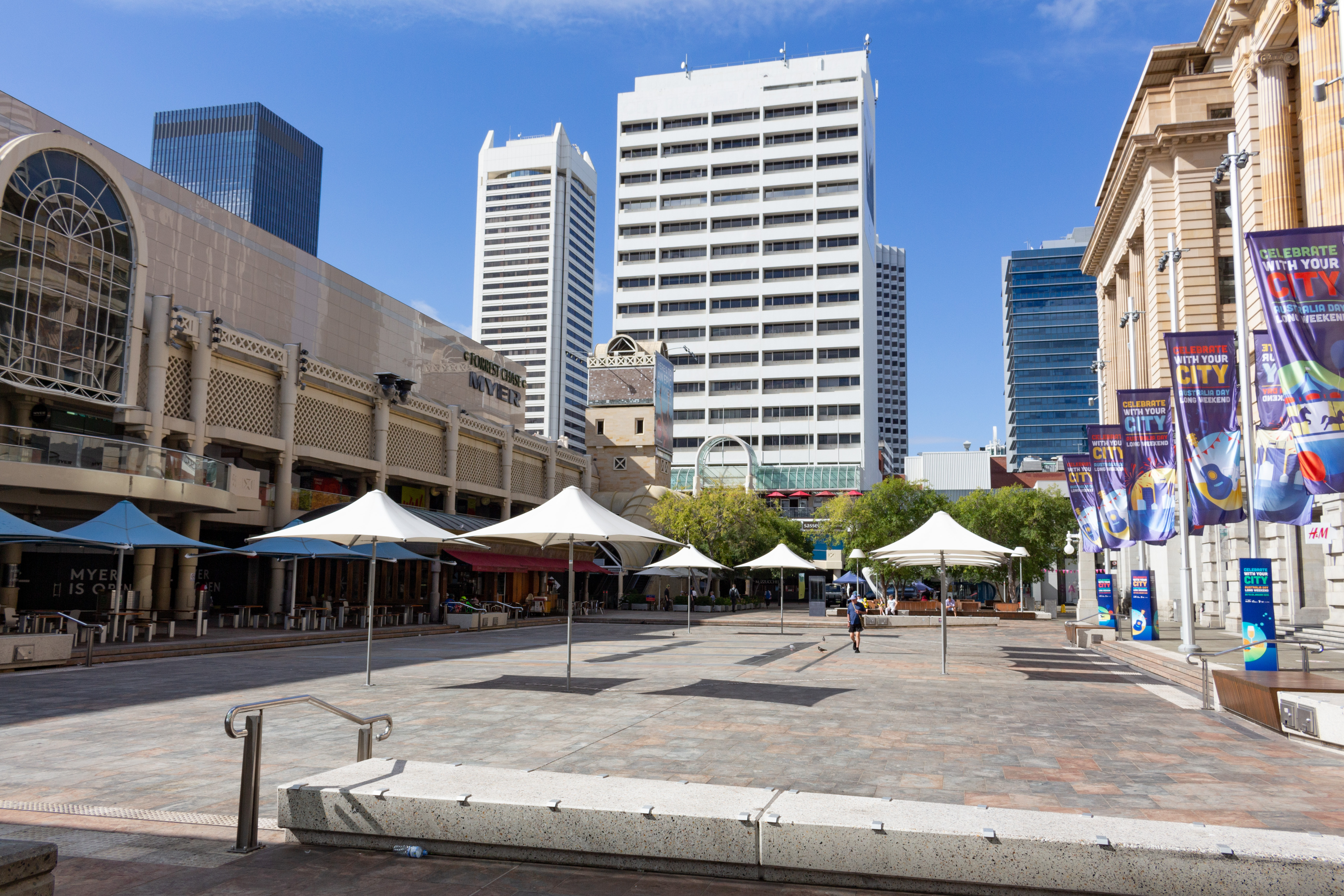
View south along Forrest Place towards the Murray Street Mall and Carillon City. Forrest Chase is located on the left (seen prior to its 2019 redevelopment).

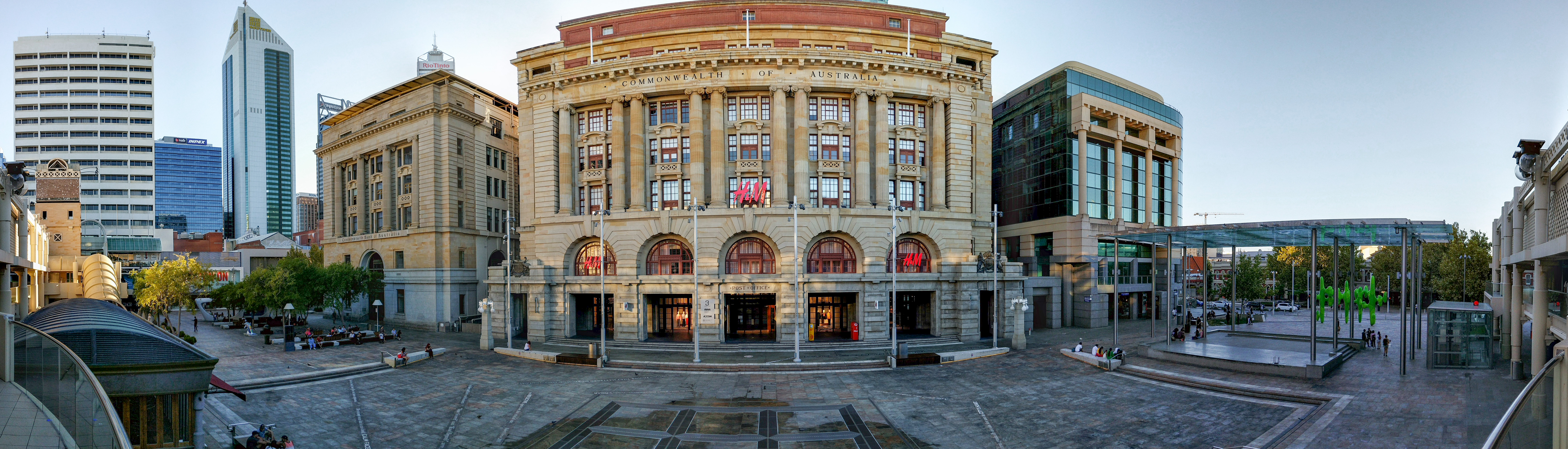
Forrest Place is bounded to the west by the Commonwealth Bank building, the General Post Office building and Albert Facey House

Forrest Place is a pedestrianised square located within the central business district of Perth, Western Australia. The street was created in 1923, and has a history of being a focal point for significant political meetings and demonstrations.

== Description ==
Forrest Place connects Perth railway station on Wellington Street with the Murray Street Mall, outside the Carillon City shopping centre. It is 150 metres (490 ft) long, and is paved and landscaped as a pedestrianised square, with seating, public artwork, and trees. The north end of the street features the Grow Your Own public artwork by James Angus (colloquially referred to as "The Cactus") as well as a stage sheltered by a glass and steel canopy. The eastern side of the street is lined by shops from the Forrest Chase shopping complex, while the historic General Post Office and Commonwealth Bank buildings are located to the west. The middle of Forrest Place features the Water Labyrinth interactive water feature, designed by Jeppe Hein.

Forrest Place is used in many ways throughout the year, including cultural displays, markets, festivals, children's activities and parades, and contains the City of Perth visitors centre.

Nearby transport facilities include Perth railway station and Perth Busport, and Perth Central Area Transit (CAT) buses run along Wellington Street.

== History ==
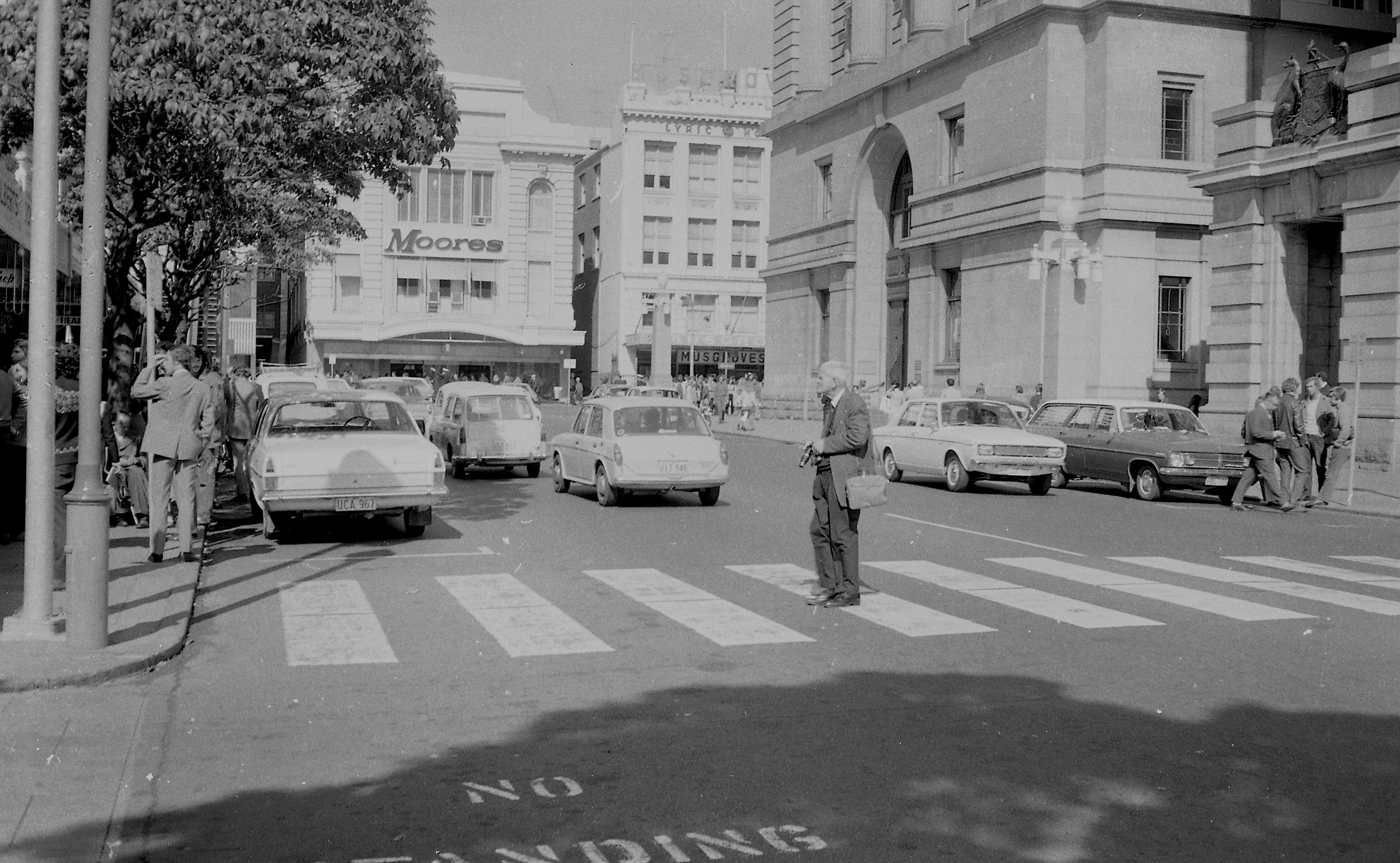
Forrest Place in 1971 – looking south toward Murray Street, Padbury Buildings to left, Commonwealth Bank Building to right rear

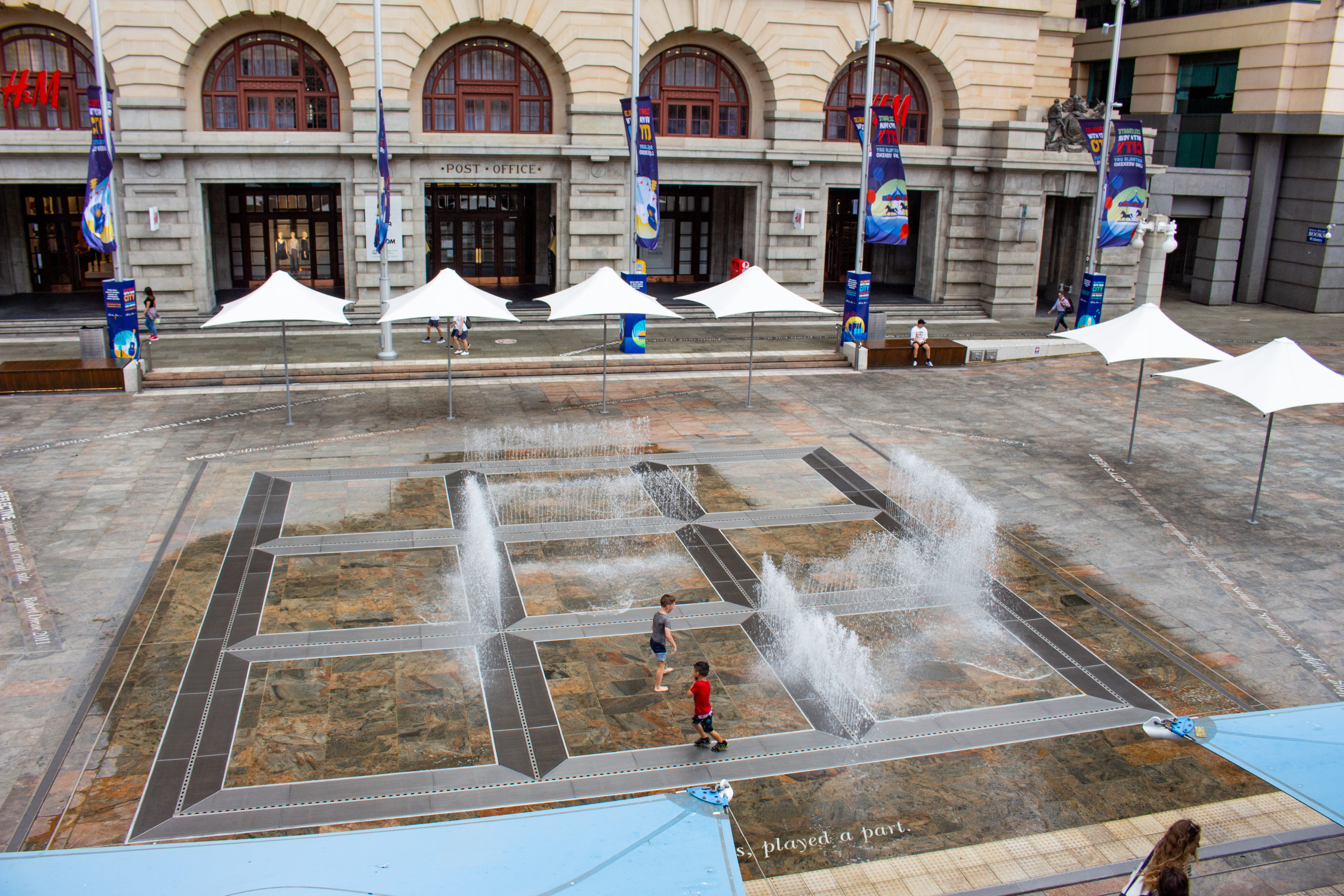
Children playing in the Water Labyrinth interactive water feature by artist Jeppe Hein

Named after Sir John Forrest, the first Premier of Western Australia, Forrest Place was for most of its history a roadway between the Perth railway station and Murray Street.

It was originally a plot of land issued to Patrick Farmer in 1833. Prior to Forrest Place's construction, an arcade between Wellington and Murray Streets existed on the site known as Central Arcade. It was considered an "unhealthy" establishment, which led to its demolition. In 1923, the completion of the construction of Forrest Place was deemed to have "changed the face of Perth".

Forrest Place was closed to traffic and became a large paved area with the removal of the roadway in late 1986. The square was redeveloped in 2011 and 2012 and saw the installation of the Grow Your Own sculpture and the Water Labyrinth interactive water feature. In addition, originally a set of stairs had led down to and connected Forrest Place with the pedestrian crossing across Wellington Street to the train station forecourt; these were replaced with a more gradual slope with bollards near Grow Your Own blocking vehicular access from the street.

=== Buildings ===
Prior to the building of the Forrest Chase complex (containing Myer and numerous other retail stores), the central building on the eastern side of Forrest Place was the Padbury Buildings (built in 1925 and demolished in 1986–1987). While the buildings on the east side have changed a number of times in the street's long history, the General Post Office (completed in 1923) and the Commonwealth Bank building (completed 1933), both designed by John Smith Murdoch in the Interwar Beaux-Arts style and faced with Donnybrook stone, have endured significant change around them.

=== Parades, meetings and rallying place ===
In the 1940s returned soldiers marched through Forrest Place. It was a meeting place and focal point for political meetings in the 1950s through to the 1980s; considerable use was made of the steps of the Post Office being above the roadway level.

An attempt to defuse the political nature of the space and ban meetings in Forrest Place was carried out by Charles Court, on 18 November 1975, when his government used Section 54B of the Western Australia Police Act to ban meetings. Considerable numbers of demonstrations resulted from this ban, which was later repealed by the Public Meetings and Processions Act of 1984.

In 2013, the history of protests held at Forest Place, and the responses by authorities, was the subject of a presentation by Murdoch University Adjunct Associate Professor Lenore Layman. These events are considered by Layman to be part of an "alternative history of Perth" that isn't so sedated. In 2017, in a chapter in the book Radical Perth, Militant Fremantle Layman develops an argument that Forrest Place was a location of conflict over the usage of the space as a place for freedom of speech, association and peaceful assembly.

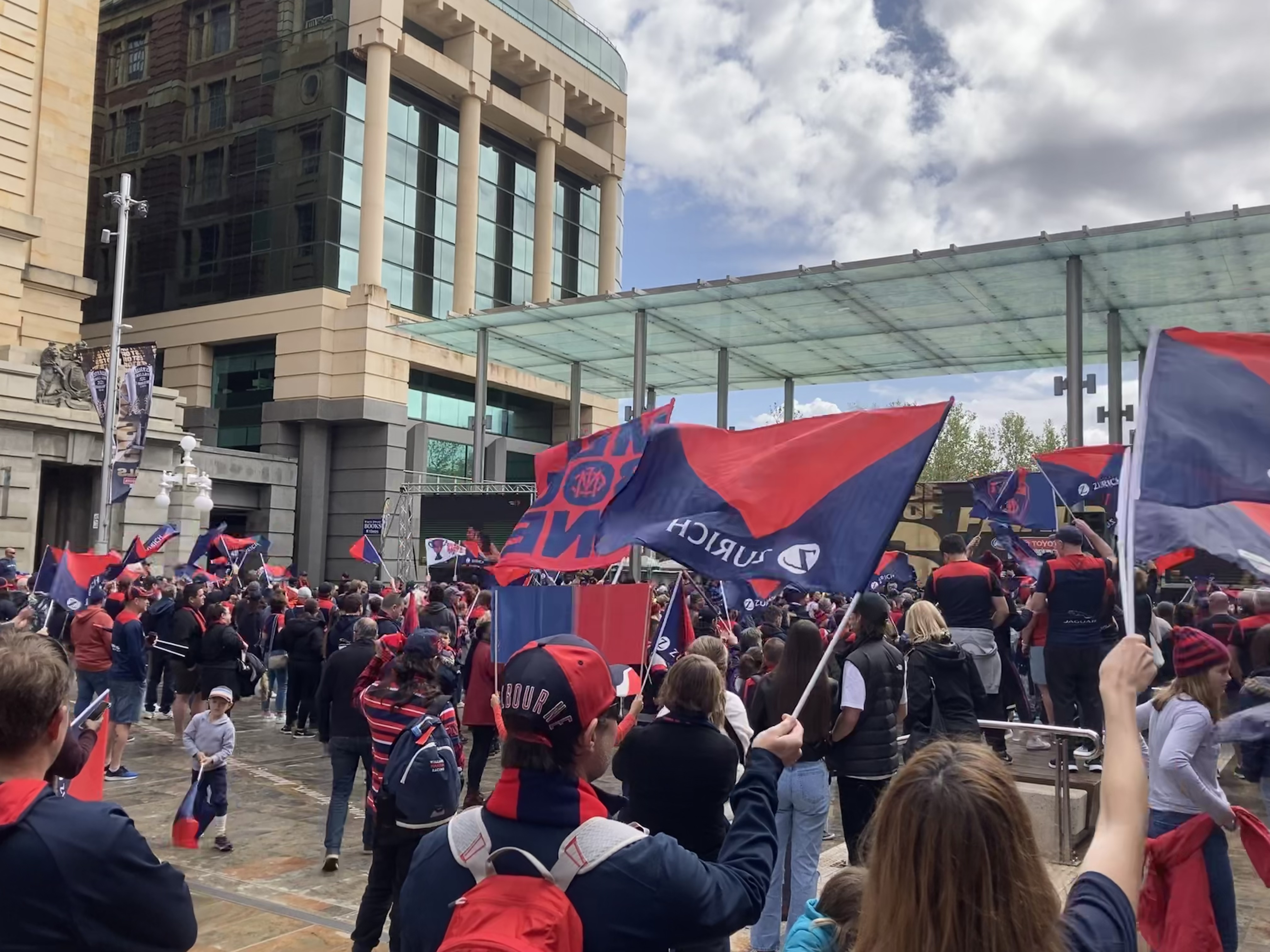
Melbourne fans at Forrest Place celebrate the day after the Demons won the 2021 AFL Grand Final that was played in Perth.

On 24 September 2021, a "people's parade" was held for AFL fans ahead of the 2021 AFL Grand Final, which was being held at Perth Stadium that year because of the COVID-19 pandemic, in lieu of the traditional AFL Grand Final parade. The premiership cup presentation also took place at Forrest Place the day after the final following the Melbourne Football Club's victory over the Western Bulldogs, with the winning team in attendance.

On 26 January 2026, at an Invasion Day rally held at Forrest Place, a homemade bomb filled with ball bearings and screws was thrown into the crowd but did not detonate, forcing the evacuation of the area by police. A 31-year-old man was initially charged with making the bomb and committing an unlawful act with intent to harm; a week later he was also charged with engaging in a terrorist act, the first such charge in Western Australian history and the first time in Australia that a terror charge had been laid as a result of an attack on Aboriginal and Torres Strait Islander persons.

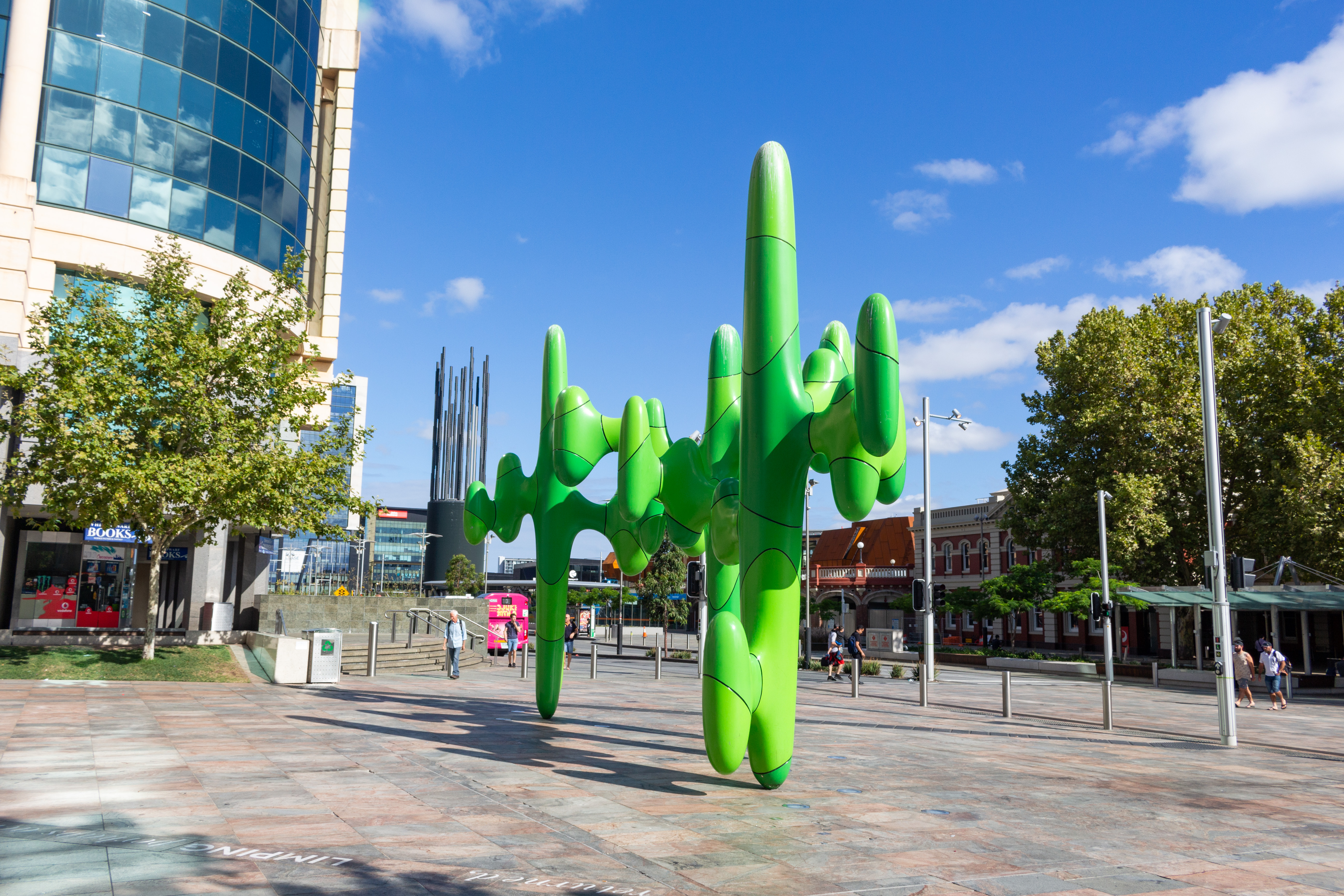
The Grow Your Own public artwork erected in August 2011 at the northern end of Forrest Place

On 18 April 2026, a social media-driven "Worship the Cactus" event drew thousands to the Grow Your Own public artwork in Forrest Place "to 'hail the great cactus' in a bizarre display of devotion to the CBD sculpture."

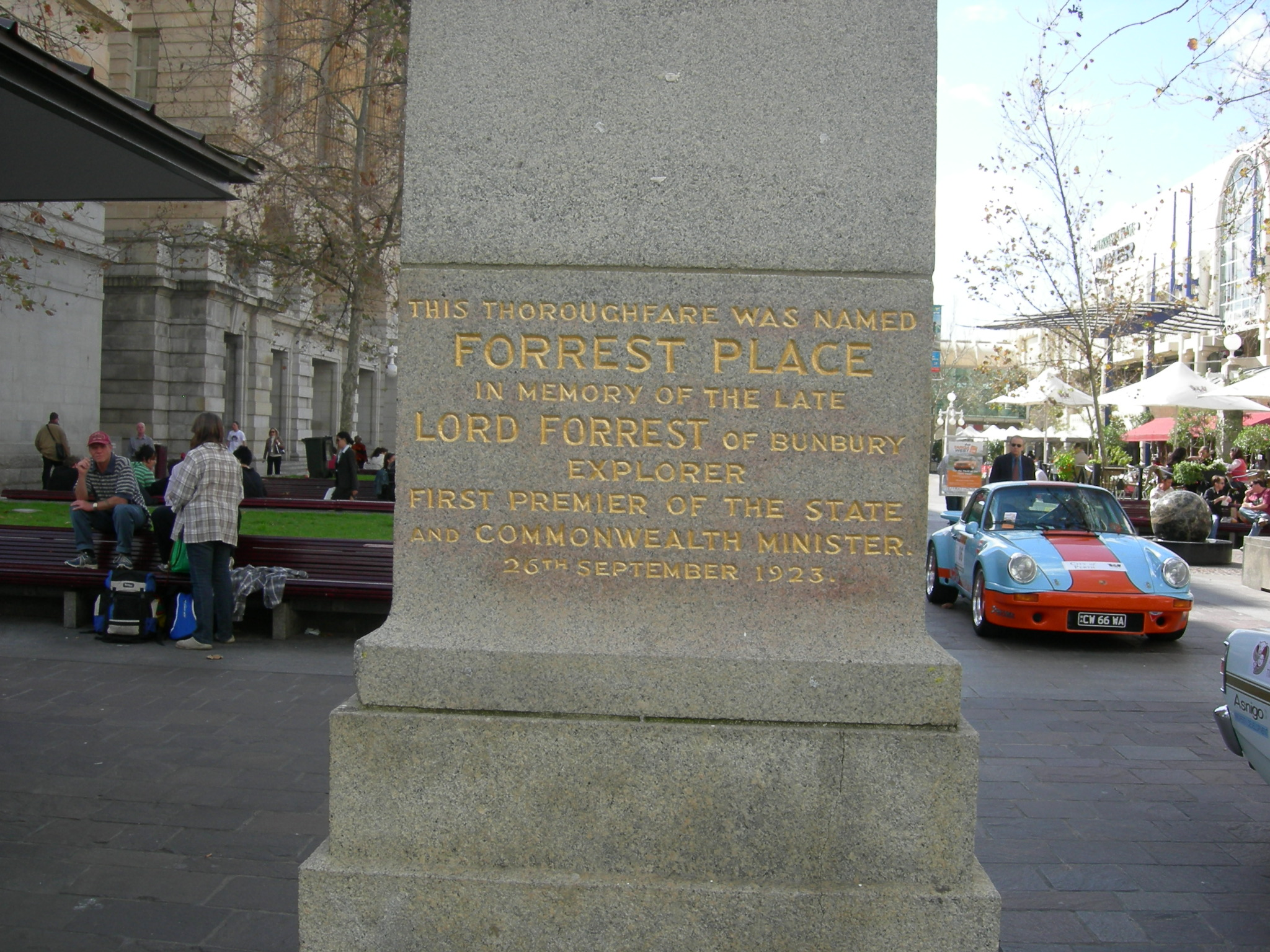
Forrest Place was officially opened by the Governor-General Lord Forster at 03:00 pm on 26 September 1923.

== See also ==
- List of lanes and arcades in Perth, Western Australia
