= St George's House, Perth =

Building in Perth, Western Australia

Terrace Hotel
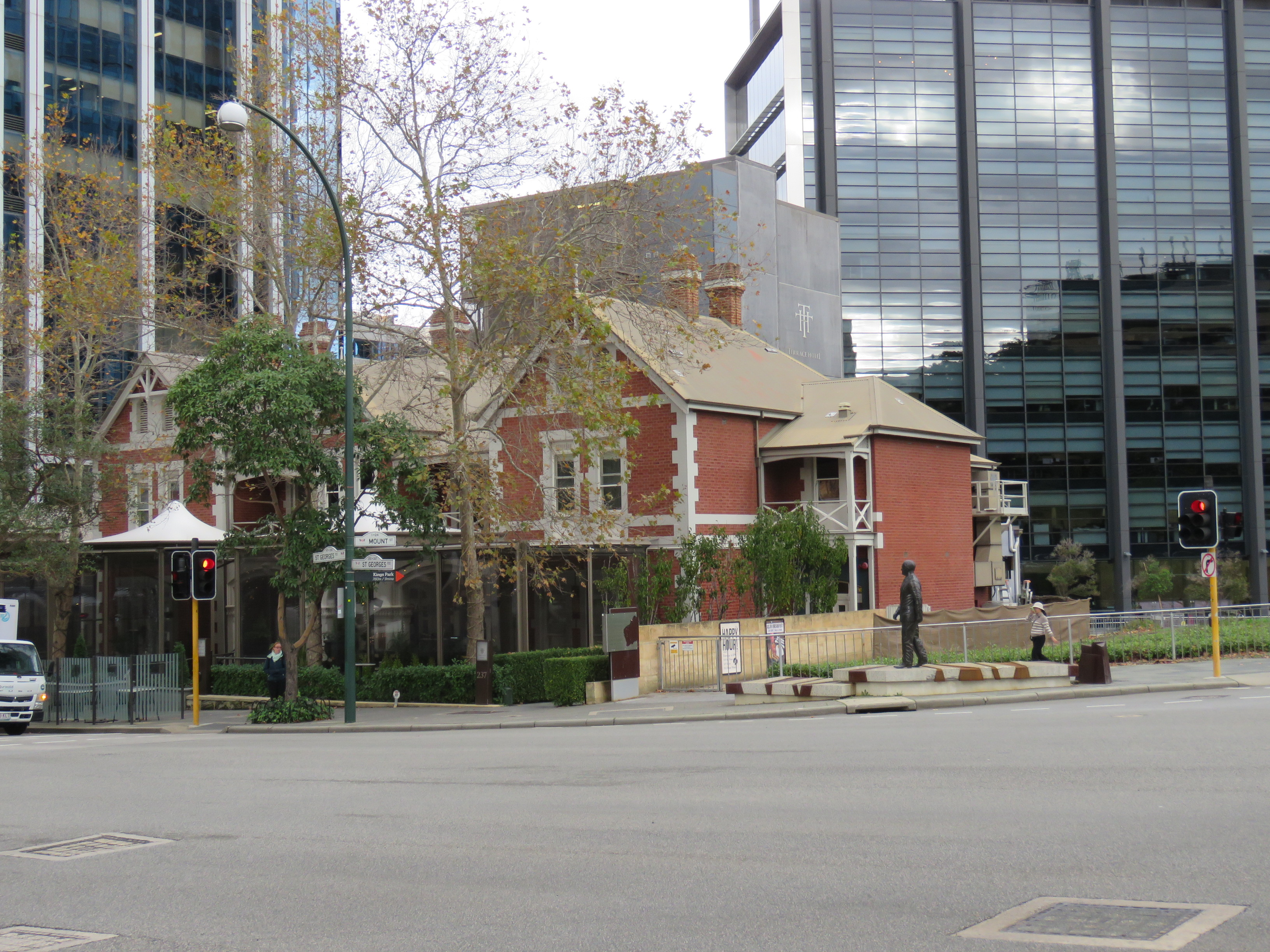
- The Terrace Hotel in June 2026
- Interactive map of the Terrace Hotel area

General information
- Architectural style: Federation Queen Anne
- Location: 237 St Georges Terrace, Perth, Western Australia
- Coordinates: 31°57′12″S 115°51′05″E
- Completed: 1892; 134 years ago

Design and construction
- Architect: John Talbot Hobbs

Western Australia Heritage Register
- Type: State Registered Place
- Designated: 29 May 2001
- Reference no.: 2094

St George's House (still known as the Terrace Hotel as of 2025) is located at 237 St Georges Terrace in Perth, Western Australia. It was also previously known as Cardigan House, Bishop's Grove and Ingle Hall.

== History ==
=== As residential dwellings ===
St George's House is a two-storey brick and corrugated iron building constructed in 1891–92, in Federation Queen Anne style. St George's House was built by the Perth Diocesan Trust of the Anglican Church, specifically to provide an income for the Trust.

In 1856 Matthew Hale, the first Anglican Bishop of Perth and an independently wealthy clergyman, purchased five allotments on St George's Terrace to build a residence for himself and his family. Hale favoured this location because of the large grounds and natural spring that flowed all year round, and because there was an existing house and stables. The land was purchased from Edward Hamersley and Alfred Hillman Senior (Assistant Surveyor General). These lots form the land known as the Bishop's See, located between St Georges Terrace, and Mount and Spring Streets at the western end of the Perth central business district.

Hale built several buildings on the Bishop's See, including Bishop's House (1859, also known as Legacy House), Bishop's Cottage (1860, also known as Clergy House), Hale House (1872, also known as the Native Mission Cottage and Hale Cottage).

In 1875 Hale handed all his Perth properties over to the Perth Diocesan Trust and left Western Australia to take up his appointment as Bishop of Brisbane. The Perth Diocesan Council constructed a number of buildings on the Bishop's See following Hales departure, included St George's House (1892, which was also known as Bishop's Grove, Cardigan and Ingle Hall), St George's Mansion (c. 1930) and Bishop's Court (1935, also known as Bishop's Grove). All these residential properties were leased to private tenants to provide an income for the diocese.

St George's House was constructed as a set of three two-storey houses in conjunction with a pair of two-storey semi-detached houses. The houses were to the design of architect John Talbot Hobbs, who was the official architect for the Perth Diocesan Council. He had arrived in Western Australia in 1887. An entry in one of Hobbs' ledgers records the preparation of plans and specifications, and supervision of the erection of five houses on St George's Terrace and the erection of a fence. The cost of this work was 225 pounds 3 shillings, equivalent to A$35,444.45 in 2022, and it was commissioned in August 1891.

A photograph taken in 1895 shows these two buildings, which were very similar in style. Both have prominent gables facing the street, corbelled chimneys, single level verandahs with decorative timber-work and rendered quoins, string courses and dressings to the windows. Whilst the verandah extended across the whole facade of the semi-detached houses, St George's House has two separate verandahs on each of the two larger gable fronts and a small awning covering a secondary entry of the western side of the building. A photograph dated 1894, shows St George's House in more detail, including turned balustrades to the verandahs above the main entry porch and a further entry to the building on the eastern side similar to that on the west. The building was basically symmetrical.

St George's House, and other buildings on the Bishop's See, had many name changes throughout their history; evidence suggests that both St George's House and the building on Lots L261/2 and L263/4 were originally referred to as Bishop's Grove even though this name was later given to a set of flats located at 225 St George's Terrace. The name Bishop's Grove is used in the two photographs that show St George's House, taken in 1894 and in 1895, referring to it and the other building as Bishop's Grove. On 31 January 1893, a tender was accepted by the Perth Diocesan Council from Musto Briggs & Gill for the construction of the Bishop's Grove roadway. Fred Alexander, in his book Four Bishops and Their See, refers to Bishop's Grove:

His [Riley's] income was drawn from government debentures, bank shares, Hale's Adelaide property, Hale Cottage, Bishop's Cottage, Bishop's Grove and a 50 pound travel pass. The gross income [in the early 1900s] amounted to 900 pounds [equivalent to A$163,000 in 2022].

Wise's Post Office Directory refers to 235-239 St George's Terrace as "Bishop's Grove" in its first edition of 1897. Previous editions do not list street numbers or the name of the building.

The history of tenants in St George's House can be ascertained from the Directory, and also indicates that the street address for St George's House may have once included 233 St George's Terrace. In 1897, four tenants are listed at Bishop's Grove, including George Leake, May Smith, Edward Hooper and George Berry. The number of tenants remains unchanged until 1906, when only three tenants are listed, being at 235, 237 and 239 St George's Terrace. In 1912, the building was being leased to tenants Miss C E Neill (233-235), Mrs E B Ward (237) and Mrs May Smith (239). From about 1915 until the 1960s, 235-239 St George's Terrace was operating either as two boarding houses or as an apartment and a boarding house. Some of the names listed in Wise's Post Office Directory as operating boarding houses are Dicken's Boarding-house (235) and Maginni's Boarding-house (237-239), 1923 Nisbet apartments (235) and Ayliffe Boarding-house (237-239), 1937 Mrs E L Dunning and Mr Edwd G Dunning (235) and Mrs H V Carter apartments (237-239), 1949.

In 1912, a two-storey high verandah was added on all four sides to St George's House, with only the central section facing St Georges Terrace left untouched. The verandahs were eventually enclosed to accommodate more rooms.

Extensive additions and alterations were carried out in 1939, to the eastern portion of the building then being referred to as "Cardigan". The architects for these works were Hobbs and Winning, and the successful contractor was A James & Co., for a price of 3,060 pounds. The works included the addition of a further 26 bedrooms and bathrooms and lavatories at the rear. The eastern gable wall facing St George's Terrace was demolished and the building renovated throughout. The front verandah and balcony were also altered and given a modern treatment in brick and concrete. The extent of these works to the eastern side of the building can be seen in a 1943 metropolitan sewerage plan. The western side appears unaltered (external walls given only) and a wing extends to the rear of the central unit. The plan shows the residences to have cellars, and shows the location of the out-buildings, fences and verandahs. A photograph taken in the 1980s shows the front gable cut back to a hip and a two-storey brick structure extending from the front of the building.

Also in 1939, the Perth Diocesan Council modernised several other city properties. Tender notices show that Hale House (in Spring Street) was modernised with extensive renovations and additions being carried out; St George's Hall and Crystal Hall (both on the corner of Hay Street and Cathedral Avenue) also underwent renovations and alterations including the addition of a new modern style facade. Hobbs and Winning were the architects for all these works.

The name "Bishop's Grove" was now being used to refer to a set of flats built in 1935 by the Perth Diocesan Council at 225 St George's Terrace (designed by Hobbs Forbes and Partners and also sometimes referred to as Bishop's Court). From 1940 onwards, Wise's Post Office Directories show Bishops's Grove Flats being at 225 St George's Terrace. This building was demolished in 1986 to make way for St George's Square office tower.

=== Conversion to offices and redevelopment ===
During the 1960s, St George's House was converted from boarding houses into offices in response to higher rental values, and a lunch bar was provided on the ground floor. Although no notice of demolition has been located, it would appear that during the 1960s the other residential building on Lots L261/2 and L263/4 was demolished to make way for BP House, which was designed by Hobbs, Winning and Leighton and built in 1968.

By the early 1980s, the Perth Diocesan Trust was concerned that the Bishop's See was losing money. A plan for the redevelopment of the site by Oldham Boas Ednie Brown, including three high rise office towers, a low rise office tower, a three-level podium structure, restoration of Bishop's House and gardens and 1,200 parking bays, was approved by Perth City Council. St George's Investments (later Australian City Properties (ACP)) obtained a 99-year leasehold of the 1.62-hectare (4-acre) property in 1986. The buildings in Bishop's See included St George's House, Bishop's House and BP House. Bishop's Grove Flats had been demolished for the St Georges Square office tower development that included a tennis court, parterre garden and a carpark. Included in the original lease conditions was the proviso that Bishop's House had to be restored and opened to the public.

Although there were plans for the building's demolition due to its dilapidated condition, Alistair McAlpine (property developer, treasurer of Britain's Conservative Party, and Chairman of St Georges Investments (ACP)) decided to retain and refurbish the building and rename it St George's House. St George's House therefore became ACP's corporate headquarters.

In 1986, ACP commissioned the architectural firm, Oldham Boas Ednie-Brown, to carry out the restoration of St George's House, which involved partial conservation and partial adaptation with some new material being introduced. Much of the external timberwork (such as the picket fencing, verandah balustrades, and gable finials) had disappeared, the tuckpointed brickwork had been painted, original roof sheeting had been replaced, the original roof vents had gone and the single-storey front porches had been removed. Internally, larger rooms had been subdivided, new doorways added and original timber work and plaster mouldings had been either damaged or were missing. The facade also now consisted of asbestos sheeting and louvre windows.

The outer layer of additions and alterations that hid its character for more than 50 years was completely removed in 1987, reducing the number of rooms from 60 to 30. Much of the original fabric, particularly the bricks, had to be replaced owing to its poor condition. Some, though not all, of the verandahs were also reinstated and the building was completely refurbished internally.

In 1996, a proposal was put before the Perth City Council to subdivide the Bishop's See to create a separate lot of 4,700 square metres (51,000 sq ft), containing St George's Square and the parterre gardens (Lot A). The proposal included the retention of St George's House and Bishop's House on Lot B and the site of a proposed 50 storey office complex.

Approval was given subject to the development of a minor town planning scheme for the site to resolve plot ratio and car-parking distribution for the lots. St George's Square was sold in 1998.

From 2000 to 2002, it was used as offices by the Hawaiian Property Investments but then remained vacant from 2002 to 2011.

=== The Terrace Hotel ===
St George's House was refurbished and converted into a luxury boutique hotel – The Terrace Hotel – with 15 rooms, large bar and restaurant. The hotel opened on 1 November 2012. The Terrace Hotel was nominated as a finalist in the WA Heritage Awards as an Outstanding Tourism Product. The Western Australian Heritage Awards were established in 1992 to recognise outstanding commitment and contribution to heritage conservation and the promotion of heritage in Western Australia. The hotel announced its closure on 7 July 2018, but reopened under new management in 2022. It now serves as a premium casual venue in the west end of St Georges Terrace.

== Heritage value ==
St George's House was classified by the National Trust of Western Australia on 11 May 1998 and listed on the City of Perth's Municipal Inventory, which was adopted 13 March 2001. It was permanently entered on to the State Register of Heritage Places on 24 March 2000 by the Heritage Council of Western Australia.
