= St Georges Terrace =

Street in the central business district of Perth, Western Australia

St Georges Terrace, Perth Western Australia
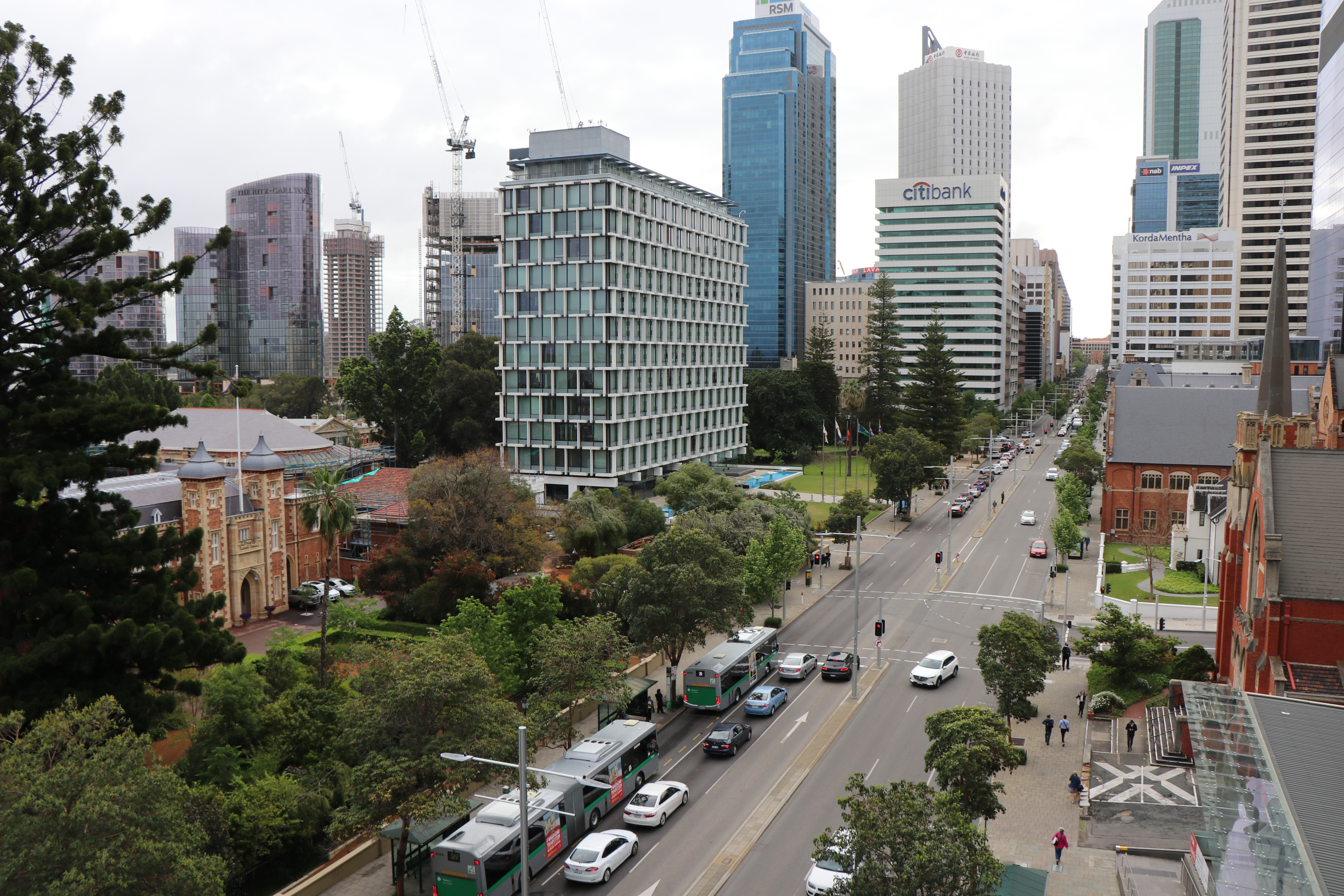
- View west along St Georges Terrace from ANZAC House
- Coordinates: 31°57′28″S 115°51′55″E (East end); 31°57′09″S 115°50′56″E (West end)

General information
- Type: Street
- Length: 1.6 km (1.0 mi)

Major junctions
- East end: Adelaide Terrace; Victoria Avenue
- Barrack Street (State Route 53); William Street (State Route 53); Milligan Street/Mount Street
- West end: Malcolm Street; Elder Street

Location(s)
- Suburb(s): Perth

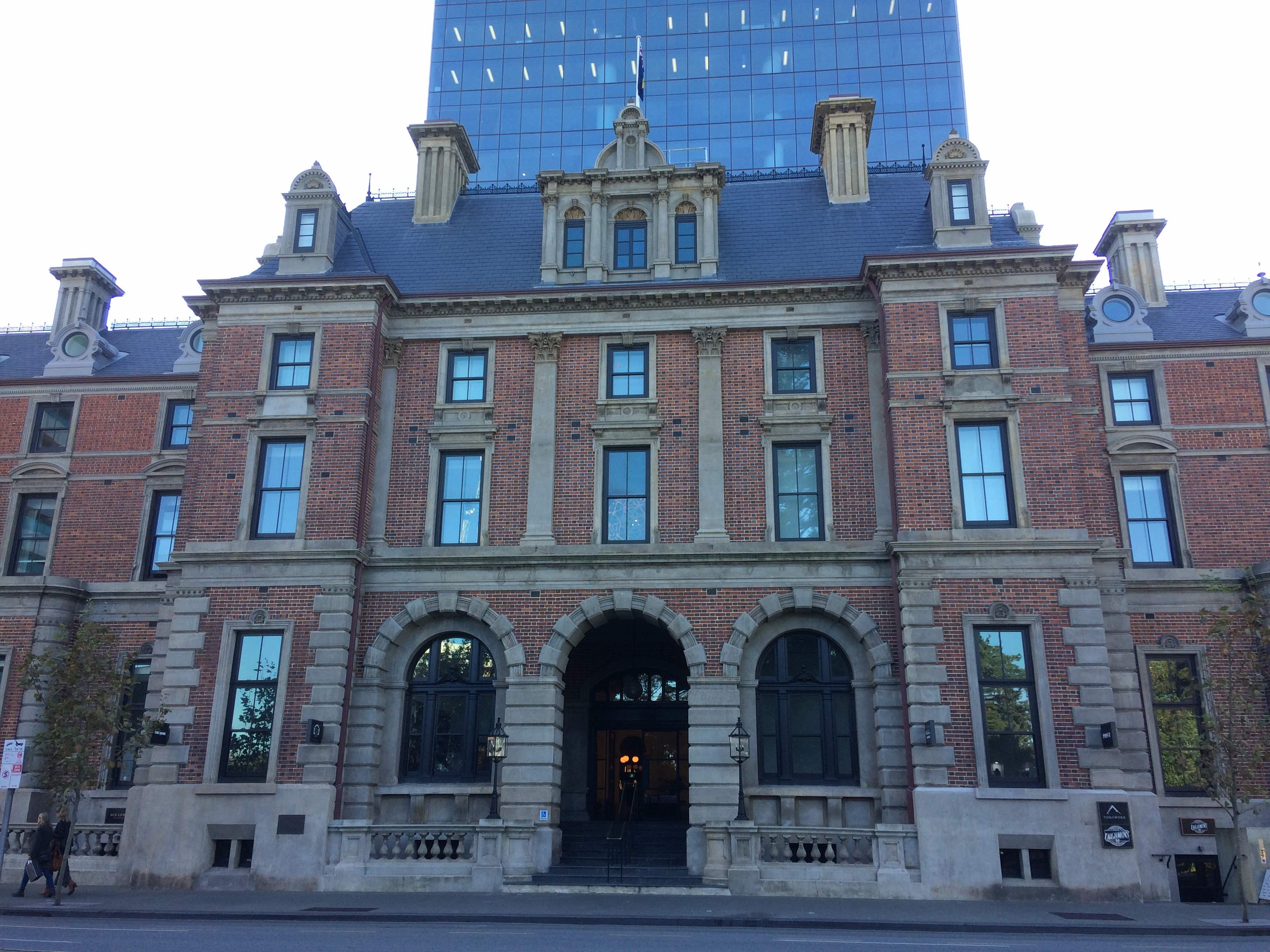
Old Treasury Buildings on St Georges Terrace

St Georges Terrace (colloquially known as the terrace) is the main street in the central business district (CBD) of the city of Perth, Western Australia. It runs parallel to the Swan River and forms the major arterial thoroughfare through the CBD.

Its western end is marked by the Barracks Arch near Parliament House across the Mitchell Freeway. The eastern end joins Adelaide Terrace at the intersection with Victoria Avenue.

== Naming ==
St Georges Terrace was named after the Patron Saint of England and Britain's ruling monarch at the time, King George IV, and shown on plans of Perth from the 1830s onwards. St George's Cathedral takes its name from the road name. Originally, houses occupied by clergy of the cathedral and lay clerks of the cathedral choir constituted a substantial portion of the Terrace. Some of these houses such as The Deanery remain, however the majority of these were demolished in the 1960s.

The apostrophe was removed from the name in 1956 by the Department of Lands and Surveys (now Landgate) in accordance with international naming practices when applied to a geographic name.

== Streetscapes ==
The level of St Georges Terrace is in effect at the top of a ridge, where the short streets that descend southerly towards Perth Water all provide views of the Swan River, including Barrack Street, Sherwood Court, Howard Street, William Street, Mill Street and Spring Street.

== History ==
=== Buildings ===
The main streetscape between Barrack Street and William Street in the 1930s and 1940s constituted considerable uniformity of design and building height. By the late 1970s removal of significant older buildings for taller more modern buildings changed this permanently. Perth's earlier tallest buildings were located on St Georges Terrace, including the Colonial Mutual Life building (tallest building in Perth from 1936 to 1962), subsequent tallest buildings were: Citibank House (37 St Georges Terrace, 1962 until 1970; it was then known as the T & G Building), Parmelia House (191 St Georges Terrace, 1970 to 1973), 140 St Georges Terrace (AMP Building, 1975 to 1976), Allendale Square (77 St Georges Terrace, 1976 to 1977), St Martins Tower (44 St Georges Terrace, 1978 to 1988), 108 St Georges Terrace, (1988 to 1992) and Central Park (152-158 St Georges Terrace, tallest since 1992).

A number of other buildings are along the Terrace:

- 100 St Georges Terrace
- Council House
- Brookfield Place
- Christian Brothers' College
- The Cloisters
- London Court
- Old Perth Boys School
- Palace Hotel
- Perth Concert Hall
- QV1
- St George's House
- Technical School

=== Redevelopment (1960s–1980s) ===
The British businessman and property developer Alistair McAlpine, writing in his 1999 memoir, Bagman to Swagman, criticised the manner of development on the street from the mid-twentieth century:

Perth in the early 1960s was a large, sprawling country town with a main street of commercial buildings where the lawyers and other professionals worked. St George's Terrace was at that time a noble street. Slowly over the past 40 years, its grand buildings have been knocked down and replaced by pale images of skyscrapers taken from the pages of glossy magazines devoted to the world's architecture. These buildings have neither elegance nor originality.

The 1968 earthquake which occurred in Meckering, 130 kilometres east of Perth, caused damage to some buildings in Perth city, including St George's Cathedral on the Terrace, and contributed to the decision to demolish some older buildings.

The Art Deco and Modernist Society of Western Australia note that "The 1960s brought a demolition blitz on St George's Terrace due to a mining boom and preference for modern office spaces, leading to the loss of cinemas and other buildings. Over the next two decades, nothing on St George's Terrace was safe."

== Commemorative plaques ==
Set into the footpaths along St Georges Terrace are a series of commemorative plaques honouring notable figures in Western Australia's history. Originally 150 plaques were installed in 1979, as part of the WAY 79 celebrations, marking the state's 150th year of European settlement. Since then, additional plaques have been added, so that there was one for each year from 1829 to 1999. In 2014, the 1959 plaque, commemorating Rolf Harris, was removed after Harris was convicted of sexual assault.

== Intersections ==
LGA	Location	km	mi	Destinations	Notes
Perth	Perth	0	0.0	Adelaide Terrace / Victoria Avenue	Traffic light controlled; Victoria Avenue is one-way northbound north of intersection; St Georges Terrace continues east as Adelaide Terrace
Perth	Perth	0.25	0.16	Irwin Street	Traffic light controlled; Irwin Street is one-way southbound
Perth	Perth	0.4	0.25	Pier Street	Traffic light controlled; no right turn from St Georges Terrace westbound onto Pier Street
Perth	Perth	0.5	0.31	Cathedral Avenue	
Perth	Perth	0.6	0.37	Barrack Street (State Route 53)	Traffic light controlled; no right turn from St Georges Terrace eastbound to Barrack Street southbound or Barrack Street southbound to St Georges Terrace westbound
Perth	Perth	0.7	0.43	Sherwood Court	Sherwood Court is one-way southbound; left turn from St Georges Terrace westbound onto Sherwood Court only
Perth	Perth	0.8	0.50	Howard Street	Howard Street is one-way southbound; left turn from St Georges Terrace westbound onto Howard Street only
Perth	Perth	0.9	0.56	William Street	Traffic light controlled; no right turn from St Georges Terrace westbound to William Street northbound.
Perth	Perth	1.1	0.68	King Street	King Street is one-way northbound
Perth	Perth	1.1	0.68	Mercantile Lane	Left-in/left-out from St Georges Terrace westbound
Perth	Perth	1.2	0.75	Mill Street	Traffic light controlled
Perth	Perth	1.4	0.87	Milligan Street / Mount Street	Traffic light controlled; no right turn from Mount Street to St Georges Terrace eastbound or Milligan Street to St Georges Terrace westbound
Perth	Perth	1.6	0.99	Malcolm Street / Elder Street	Traffic light controlled; Elder Street is one-way southbound; St Georges Terrace continues west as Malcolm Street
1.000 mi = 1.609 km; 1.000 km = 0.621 mi: Incomplete access
