= T & G Building =

T & G Building may refer to the following buildings in Australia:

- T & G Building, Brisbane
- T & G Building, Geelong
- T & G Building, Townsville
- T & G Mutual Life Assurance Building, in New South Wales
- Citibank House, Perth, formerly T & G Building
