= T & G Building, Townsville =

Defunct landmark building in Townsville, Australia

T & G Mutual Life Assurance Society Building, Townsville
- Interactive map of T & G Mutual Life Assurance Society Building, Townsville
- 19.2617°S 146.8156°E
- Location: 420 Flinders Street, Townsville, Queensland, Australia

History
- Built: 1955; 71 years ago
- Built for: T & G Mutual Life Assurance Society
- Demolished: 2008; 18 years ago

The T & G Building was a landmark office building in Townsville, Australia. Constructed in 1955-9, the two and three storey building was designed in a 1950s version of art deco, featuring a striking vertical 36 metres (118 ft), 6 storey high clock tower on the a corner of Flinders and Stanley streets. The building was demolished in 2008.

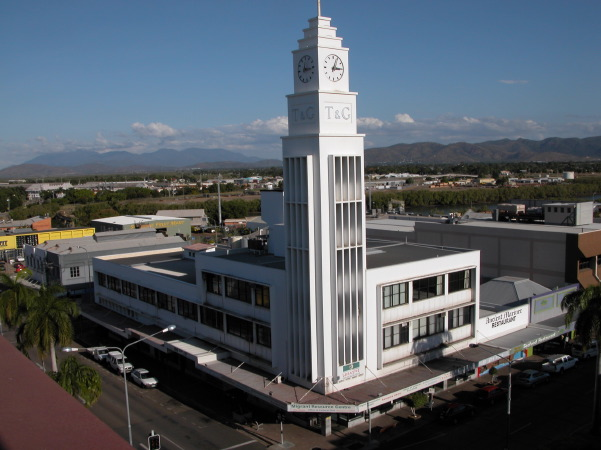
T&G Building, Townsville, 2004

== History ==
The Australian Temperance and General Mutual Life Assurance Society established a branch in Townsville in the early 1930s and purchased the site on the corner of Flinders and Stanley Streets in May 1939 and planned to construct a large branch office, designed by Melbourne architects A&K Henderson, who had designed almost all the T&G buildings in Australia and New Zealand. However, construction was delayed due to World War II and the shortage of building materials which followed the war. In 1955 construction began to a slightly simplified design, and it was complete by 1959. The resulting building was horizontal modernist on the levels with vertical louvres shading the windows, with a strikingly vertical tower on the corner topped by the typical (pre-war) T&G stepped silhouette with 'ziggurat' capping.

In 1983 T&G merged with National Mutual and ceased to exist, and the new company sold the building in 1988. It was later used as a migrant care centre. In early 1991 the building was painted white. In 2003 following a proposed sale as a development site and likely demolition, it was nominated to the Queensland Heritage Register. The Queensland Heritage Council decided it was worthy of listing, but this was contested by the owner, who appealed to the Land and Environment Court. The judge in the case upheld the appeal, declaring that concerning its architectural merit, "In my view there is none.", and it was removed from the Register. In 2006 Townsville Developer, The Lancini Group, purchased a 50% stake in the building from former owners Northern Management Group. In 2008 the building was demolished but all four tower clock faces and two of the 'T&G' signs from the clocktower were preserved.

In 2008 during demolition of the building plans were released which announced the construction of a new 16 storey office building on the location. In 2009 revised plans were released for the site, with developer, The Lancini Group, stating that the project would be started when there was sufficient tenant support. A nine-storey office block known as the Ergon Building opened on the site in 2015.

== See also ==
- T & G Mutual Life Assurance Society
- T & G Building, Brisbane
- T & G Building, Geelong
