= A. M. Henderson =

Congregational minister in Australia (1820–1876)

Anketell Matthew Henderson (1820 – 23 June 1876) was a Congregational minister in Australia, pastor of the Independent Church on Collins Street, Melbourne.

== History ==
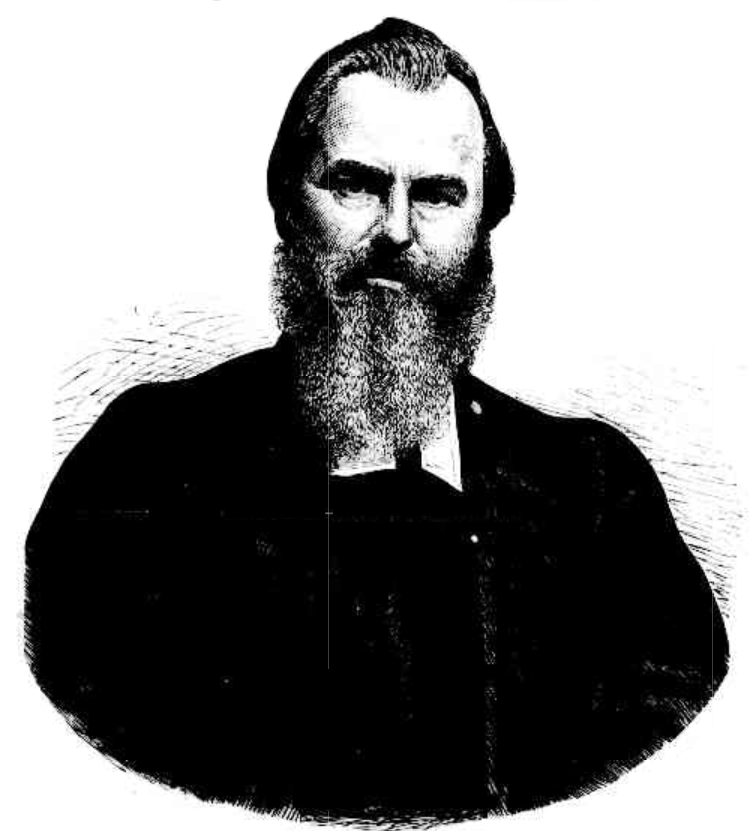
Rev. A. M. Henderson

According to one report, Henderson's parents died while he was a child, and he was raised by an aunt, and educated at a famous school in Monaghan thanks to the generosity of a wealthy relative by the name of Anketell. He trained for the Anglican ministry, but was never ordained, and around age 18, perhaps influenced by the preaching of the Rev. John Holmes (1787–1857), became associated with Wesleyan Methodism, of which he became a minister in June 1841, ten years later joining the Independents, elsewhere known as Congregationalists, and contributed to their magazine Patriot. He also wrote for the London Quarterly, and British Quarterly Review, chiefly on religio-scientific and philosophical subjects. He was assigned to the Independent church in Cork, followed by the Claremont chapel in London (?). (Note: Perhaps the Claremont Independent chapel, St Georges Road, Manchester) In 1865 he accepted a call to the Richmond, Victoria, Congregational Church and presidency of the Congregational College of Victoria.

He arrived in Melbourne with his wife and five children by the ship Kosciusko from London in late August 1865 and preached his first sermon at Richmond on 3 September.

Apart from his work for the Richmond church, Henderson delivered sermons for the Baptist church and public lectures on the topics of Creation and Evolution, which drew large crowds. In February 1866 he was offered the charge of the Independent Church on Collins Street, a building which had outlived its usefulness, on a promise of a £3,000 contribution toward the erection of a new church should he accept. Henderson advised his congregation at Richmond. A month later he addressed the Collins Street congregation, formally accepting their offer, and outlined his plans for continuing church services during the rebuilding, which would commence without delay. He conducted his first service to the Independent congregation at the Theatre Royal three days later. In the months that followed, Henderson's audience grew progressively.

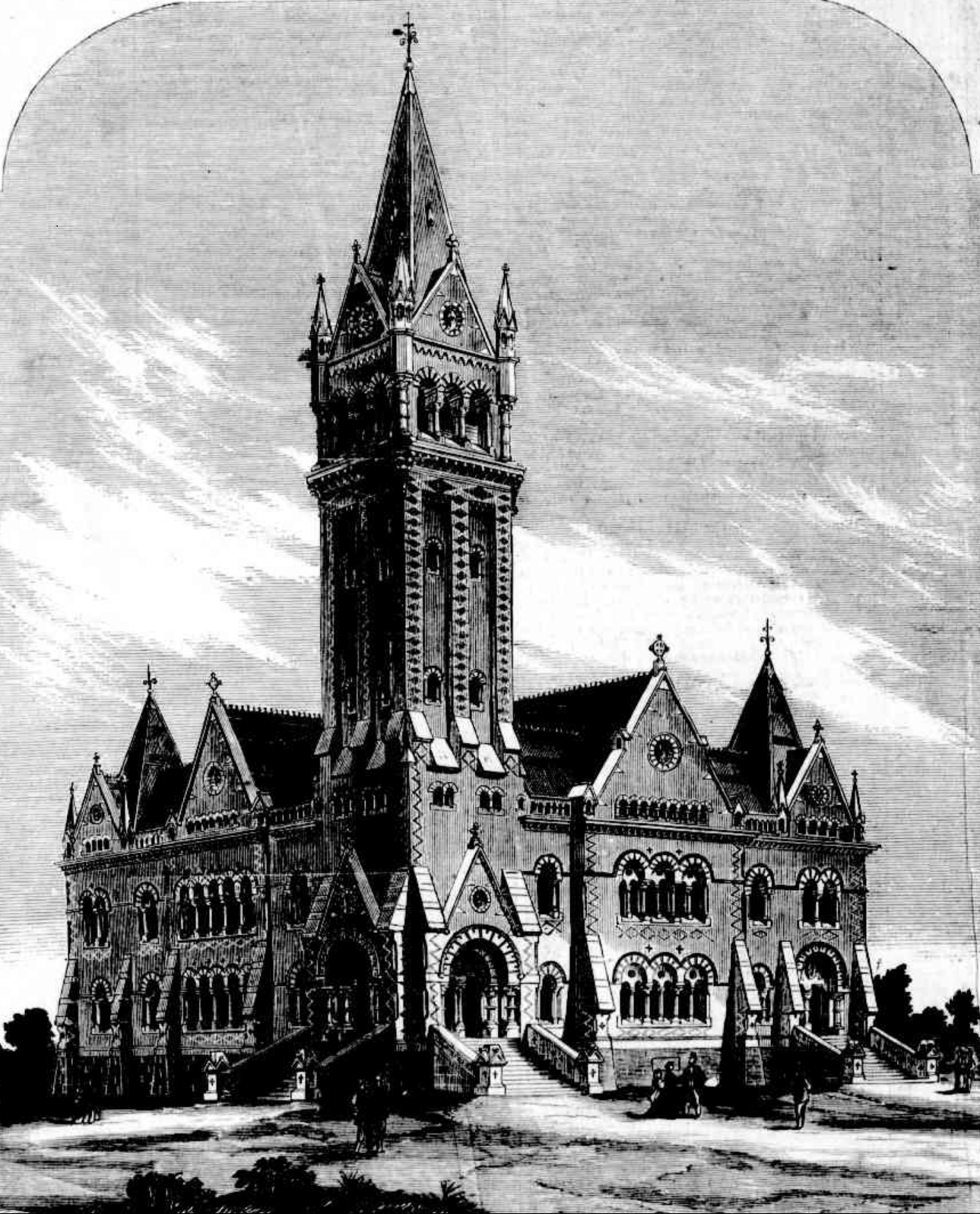
Independent church, corner Collins and Russell streets

Joseph Reed, who had already completed the State Library of Victoria, the Collins Street Baptist Church and the Wesley Church on Lonsdale Street, was commissioned as architect. The result was a Lombardo-Romanesque church with ornamental brickwork and a 150 feet (46 m) tower. The 92 feet (28 m) square plan included a spacious church with a raked floor and seating for 1400 persons, and a library which doubled as a meeting room.

The foundation stone was laid on 22 November 1866 by one Henry Hopkins of Hobart, chosen for having laid the stone for the original chapel in 1839.

The new church building was opened on 25 August 1867, the Rev. John Graham of Sydney giving the morning and afternoon services, while Rev. Henderson took the evening service, each crowded to overflowing. Collections taken to help liquidate the building fund debt, totalled close to £400. The organ, by Hill and Son of London and installed by George Fincham, was opened by David Lee in a well-attended sacred concert on 19 September 1867. All proceeds went to the building fund; by 1868 all debts had been paid.

Henderson left Melbourne on 26 January 1870 to visit other Congregationist churches — he took the Sydney pulpit of Rev. John Graham, and opened the new church at Williamstown. In October 1870 he resigned as president of the Congregational College of Victoria, but was persuaded to withdraw if he were freed of all responsibilities.

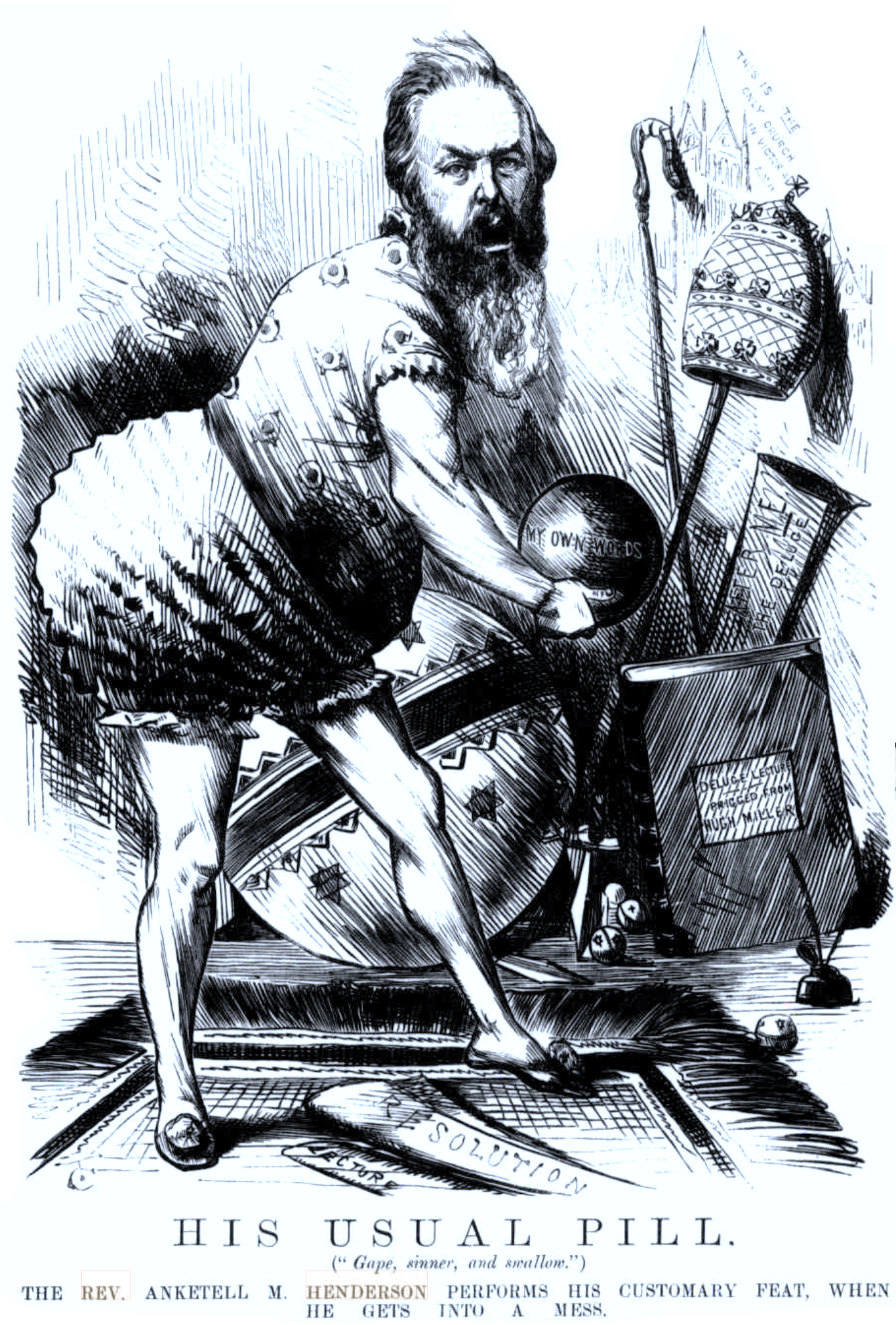
Comment by Melbourne Punch

Criticism of Henderson in the press grew throughout the 1870s, chiefly on account of his intolerance of contrary opinions. A verse by Thomas Hood was quoted against him:

A pride there is of rank, a pride of birth,
A pride of learning, and a pride of purse,
A London pride—in short, there be on earth
A host of prides, some better and some worse
But of all prides since Lucifer's attaint,
The proudest swells a self-elected Saint.

He tried to curb the publication of diverging letters and articles in the church's own newspaper, The Victorian Independent, previously regarded as an organ of opinion, his assumption of infallibility leading to characterization as a "Congregational Pope". Much of this hostility can be attributed to Henderson's well-publicised disdain for newspapers.

== Last days ==
In 1875, with failing health, Henderson's dropped most of his commitments, and later that year took himself to the mineral baths of New Zealand and holidayed in Honolulu. He toured America, where he was received as a celebrity, his name as a preacher having preceded him. He died at the home of a nephew, in Toronto, Canada.

== Family ==
Anketell Matthew Henderson (1820 – 23 June 1876) was married to Mary S(tanley) Edwards (1823 – 13 June 1899) in 1847; she died at "Carhue", Alma road, East St Kilda. Their family includes:

- Robert Edwards Henderson (1849 – 1865)
- Margaret Anketell Henderson (c. 1850 – 9 August 1901) married Richard Allen on 16 July 1874. They had two sons. Allen had a softgoods warehouse on Flinders Lane, Melbourne.
- Anketell Matthew Henderson (3 March 1853 – 15 November 1922) married Mary Louisa Andrew ( – October 1934) on 8 January 1880. They had a home "Airlie" at 641 Malvern Road, Toorak. She was a sister of Henry Martyn Andrew, head master of Wesley College and professor at University of Melbourne.

- Anketell Matthew Henderson (17 November 1880 – 25 February 1941) married Marie Rigby ( – ) on 29 August 1913. She was a daughter of Edward Joseph Rigby; He was a mining engineer, owner of the cyanide works at Bodangora.

- Edward Anketell Henderson (29 February 1918 – ) married Joan Margaret Bucknall ( – ) on 2 August 1941
- daughter born 12 January 1919

- Dr Mary Anketell Henderson (29 January 1882 – 17 January 1948) married Arthur Francis Bell (died 24 January 1924) on 8 May 1915.

- George Anketell Bell married Dorothy Helen Muir on 9 September 1942. He was with the National Standards Laboratories, University of Sydney.

- Kingsley Anketell Henderson (15 December 1883 – 6 April 1942), married Ruve Cutts Poolman on 10 December 1909. An architect, he was born in Brighton, Victoria
- Andrew Anketell Henderson, M.Sc. (c. 1885 – 28 May 1910)
- Louise Anketell Henderson (14 March 1887 – ) married Charles Edmund Bayly on 28 February 1911

- Anne/Annie Stanley Henderson (c. 1857 – 1937)
- Frederick William Henderson (c. 1859 – 18 November 1887)
