= Former Australian Temperance and General Mutual Life Assurance Society Limited Head Office =

Historic building in Wellington, New Zealand

Australian Temperance & General Mutual Life Assurance Society Limited Head Office (former)
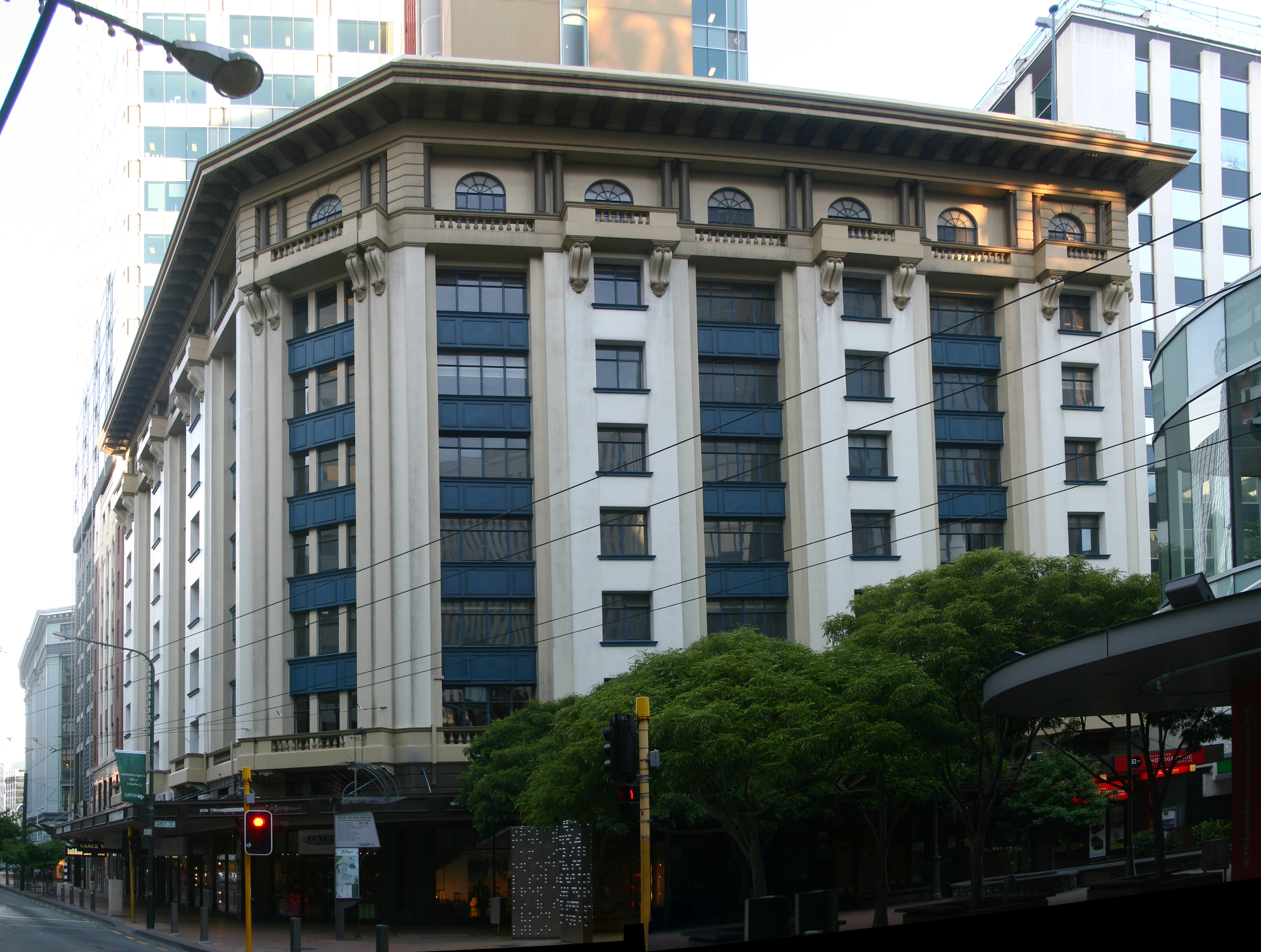
- Corner of Lambton Quay and Grey Street
- Interactive map of the Australian Temperance & General Mutual Life Assurance Society Limited Head Office (former) area

General information
- Location: Corner, 203-213 Lambton Quay and 22-32 Grey Street, Wellington, New Zealand
- Coordinates: 41.284293°S 174.775789°E
- Completed: 1928

Design and construction
- Architects: Atkins & Mitchell, Henderson, Anketell & K.
- Main contractor: Mitchell and King Ltd

Heritage New Zealand – Category 1
- Designated: 28-Jun-1990
- Reference no.: 1435

The Former Australian Temperance & General Mutual Life Assurance Society Limited Head Office (also known as the T&G Building or the Harcourts Building) is a historic building on Lambton Quay, Wellington, New Zealand.

The building was constructed by Mitchell and King Ltd. in 1926 and its construction was supervised by Atkins and Mitchell. In 1928, the Australian architect Kingsley Henderson described the building as "a very satisfactory" example of the great modern steel-frame building with concrete floors which "was here to stay".

Temperance & General used to occupy half of the eight-storey building, with the rest of the space leased by professionals such as lawyers, accountants and doctors. After Harcourts took over three floors it became known as the Harcourts Building. The building was classified as a Category I Historic Place (places of "special or outstanding historical or cultural heritage significance or value") by Heritage New Zealand in 1990.

In 2000 the building underwent some refurbishment. Internal walls were demolished and about 1000 tonnes of brick rubble was removed from the interior of the building to open it up to more light and give prospective tenants flexibility in layout.

In 2011 the building's owner Mark Dunajtschik wanted to demolish the building due to the costs of earthquake strengthening required to bring the building up to code. At that time the building was at 42% of earthquake building codes, and engineers estimated it would cost $5 million to complete earthquake-strengthening. Dunajtschik argued that the building had lost value after the 2010 and 2011 Christchurch earthquakes, and said that although it would not fall down in a severe earthquake, the historic ornamentation on the façade was dangerous and would cost too much to make good. The Historic Places Trust was in favour of retaining the building. In May 2014 Dunajtschik won an appeal against an Environment Court ruling that had blocked his plans to demolish the building, but by November that year a second Environment Court ruling had ruled against him and he reluctantly committed to a $10 million restoration of the building. At the time Dunajtschik joked that the building would be known as "Mark's Folly".

In 2016 the restored building was leased for 20 years to hotel operator Sarin Investments, and in 2018 it opened as a 106-room Hilton Doubletree hotel under a franchise agreement with Sarin Investments.
