= T & G Mutual Life Assurance Society =

Insurance company in Australia and New Zealand

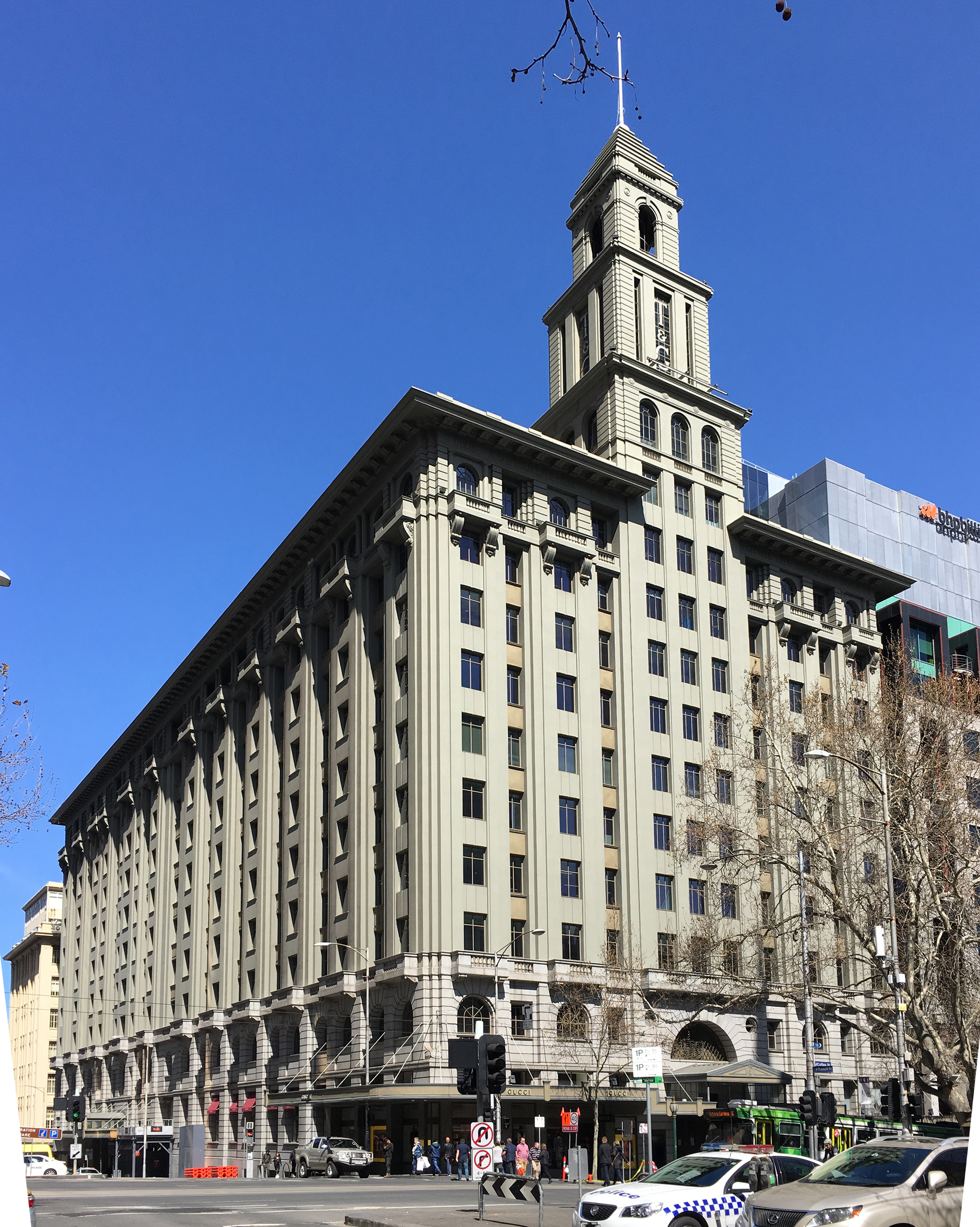
T & G Building, Melbourne in 2017

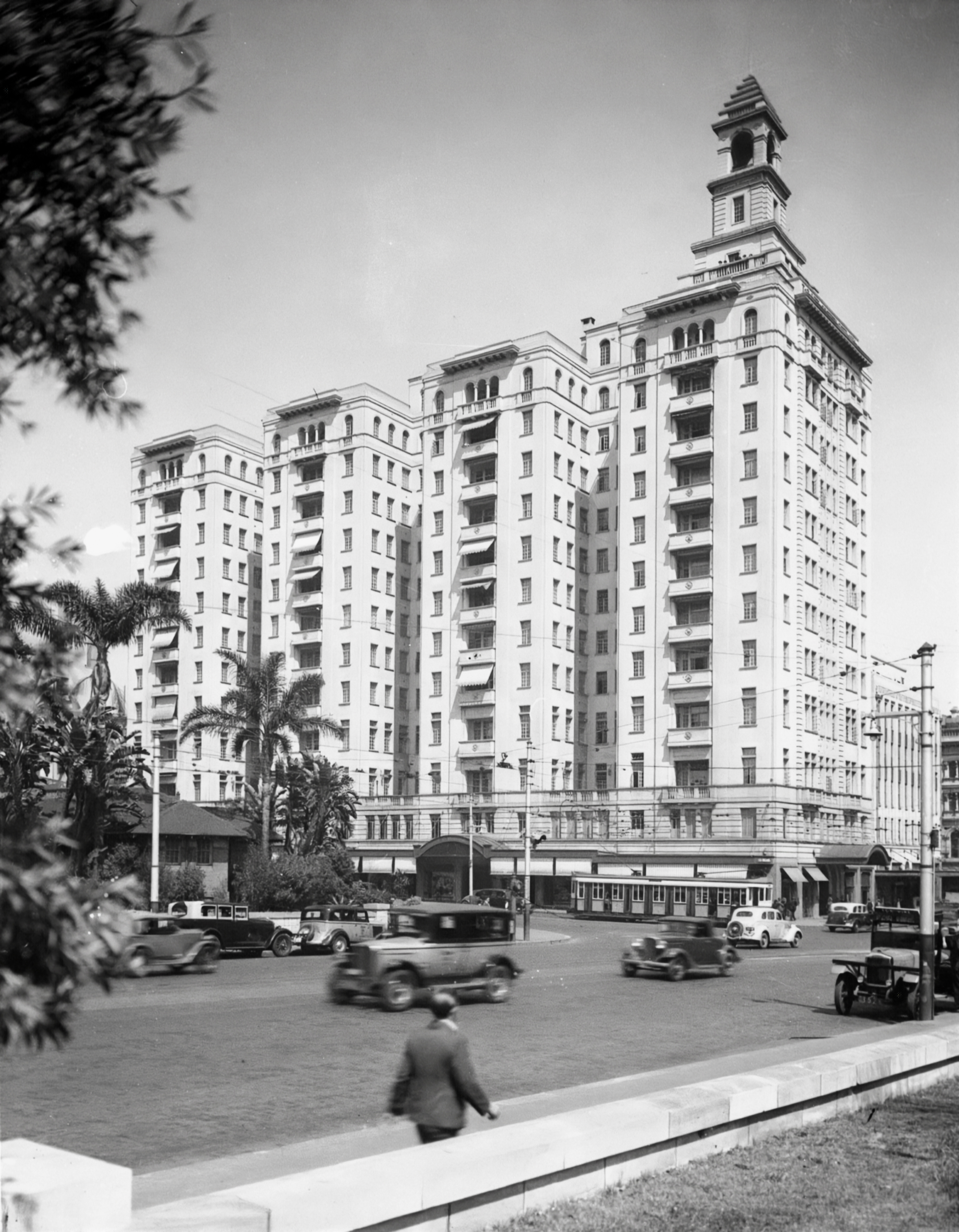
T & G Mutual Life Assurance Society Building, Elizabeth & Park Streets, Sydney, c. 1930

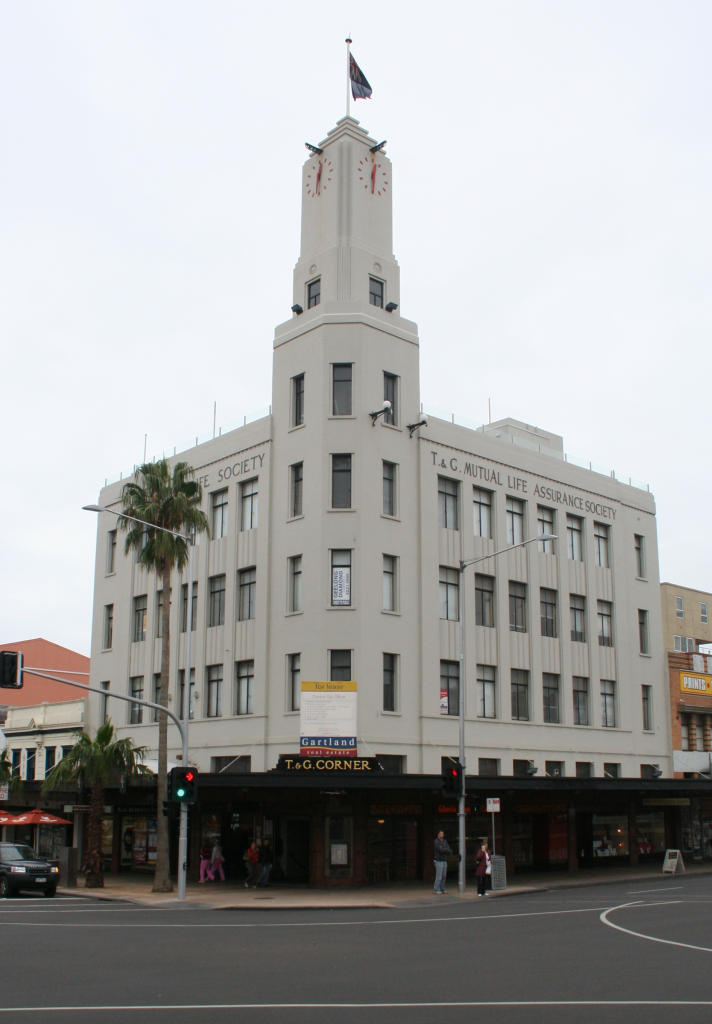
T & G building in Geelong

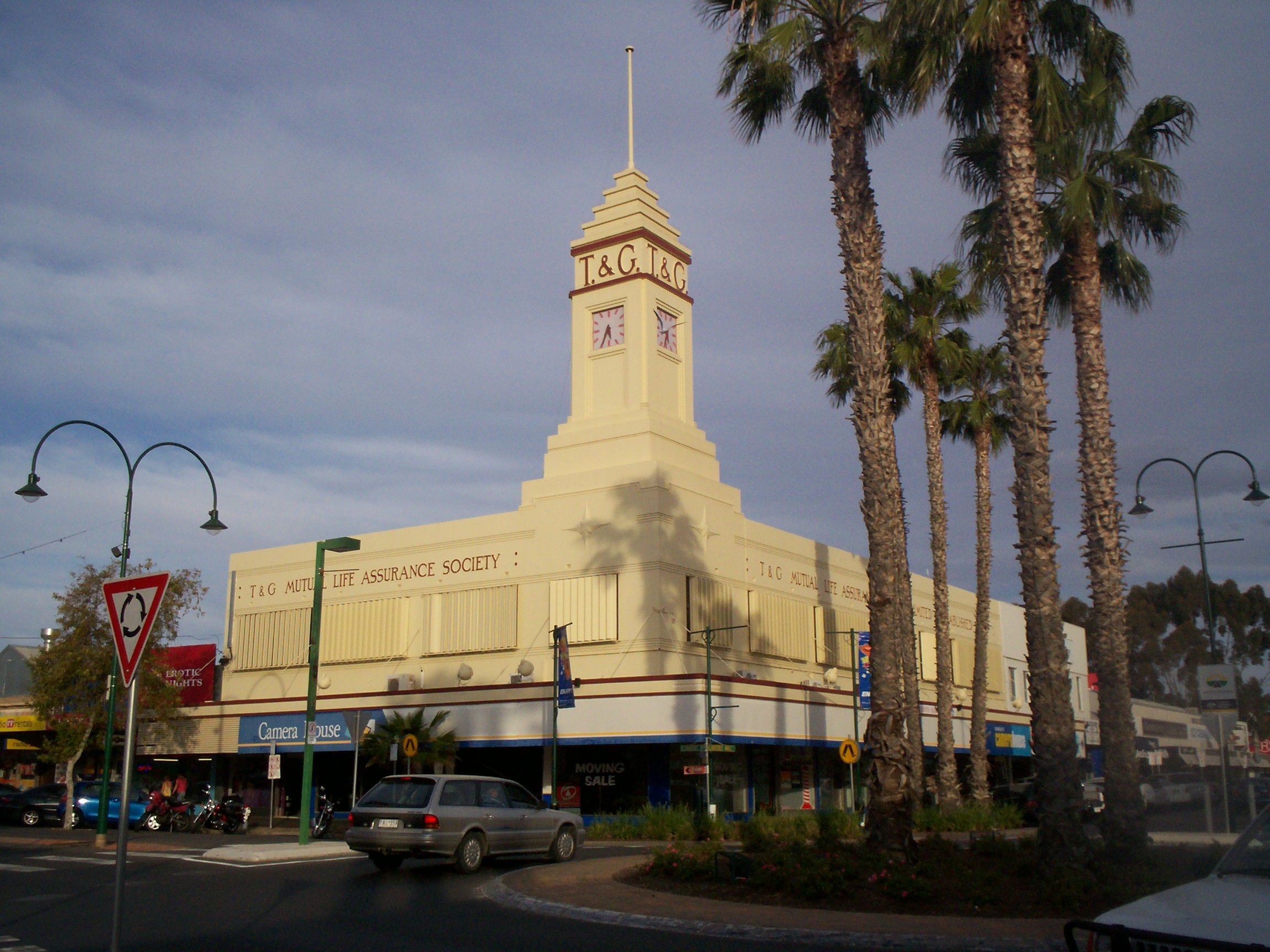
T & G building in Mildura

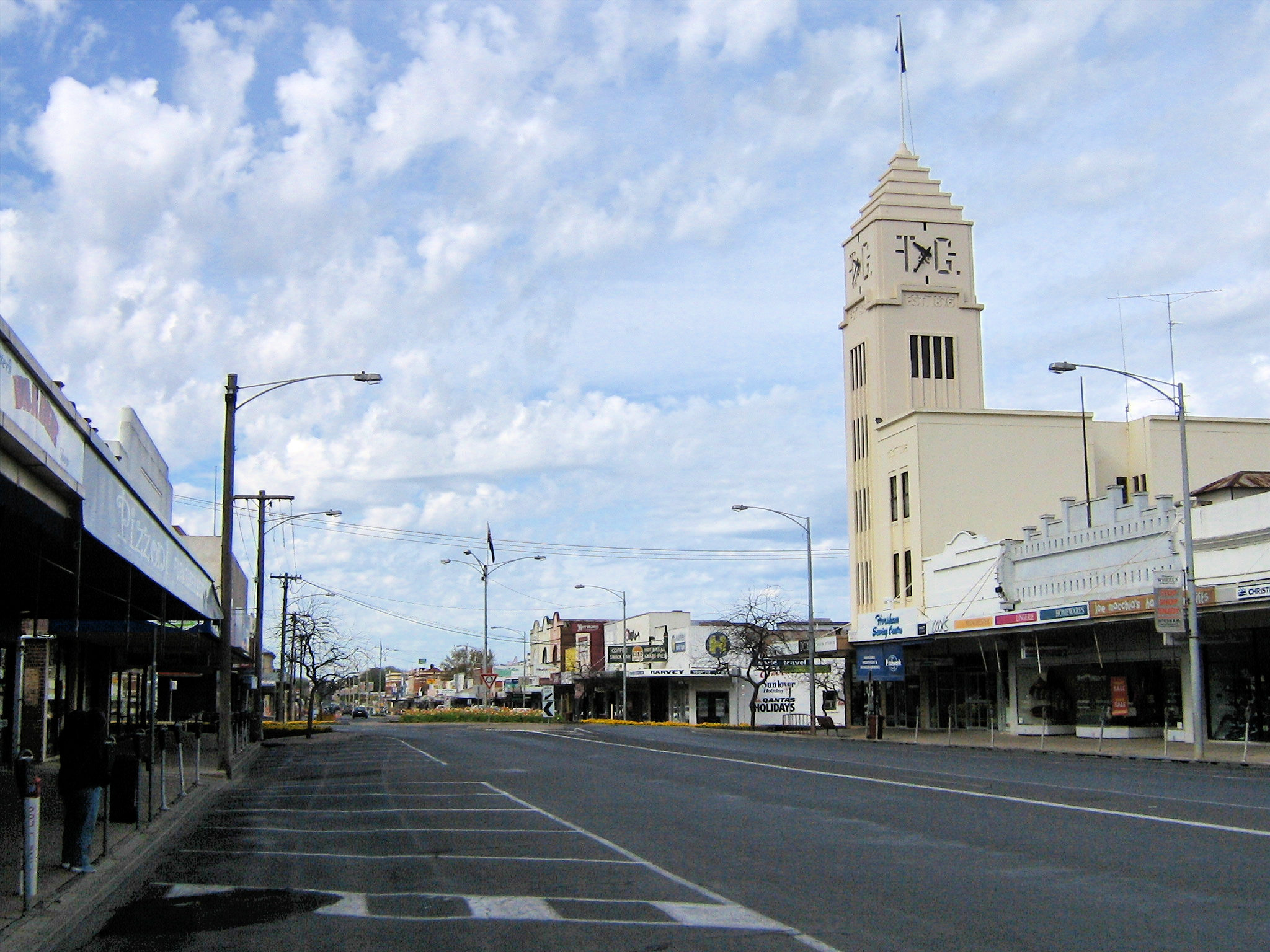
T & G building in Horsham

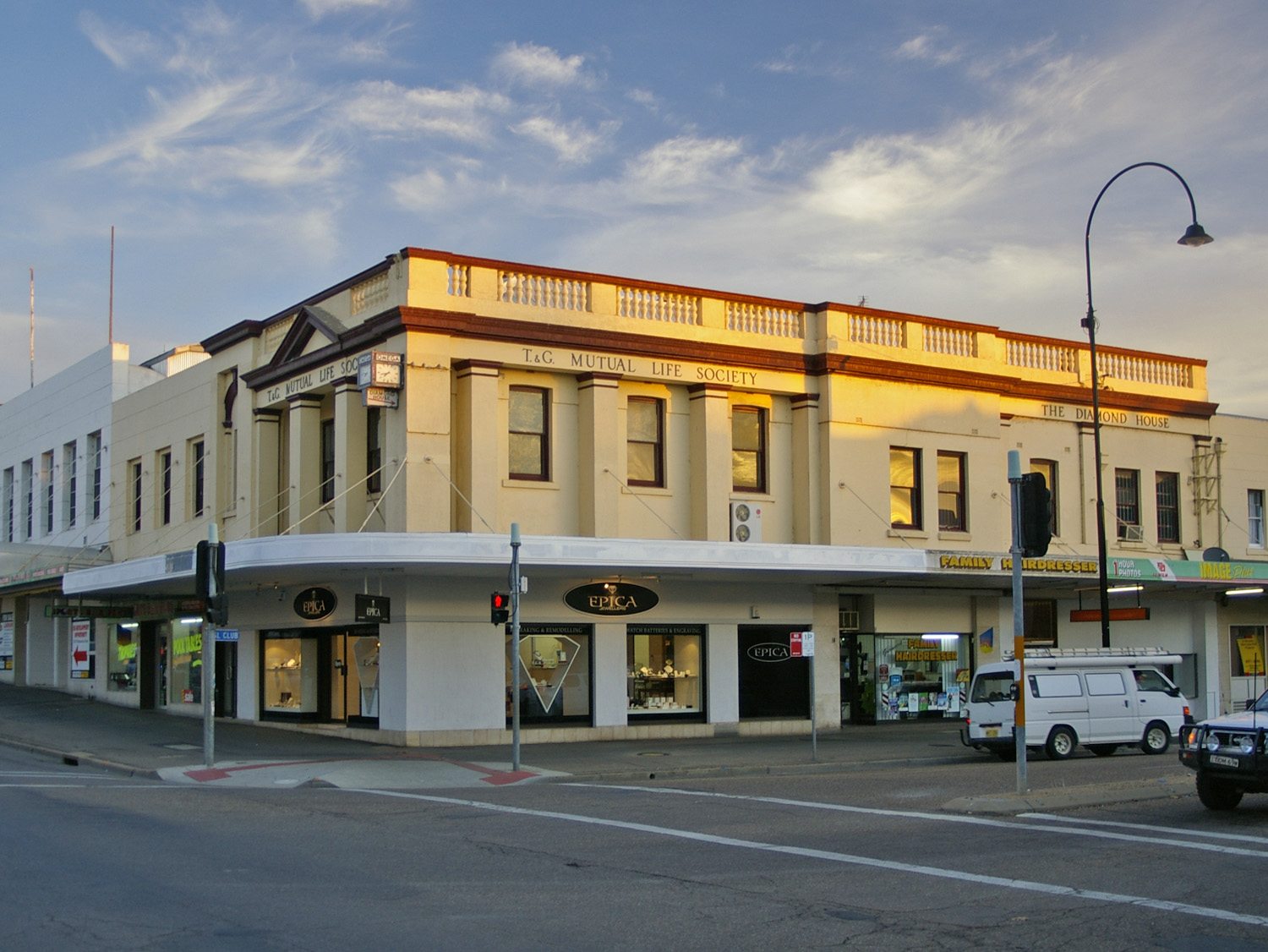
T & G building in Wagga Wagga

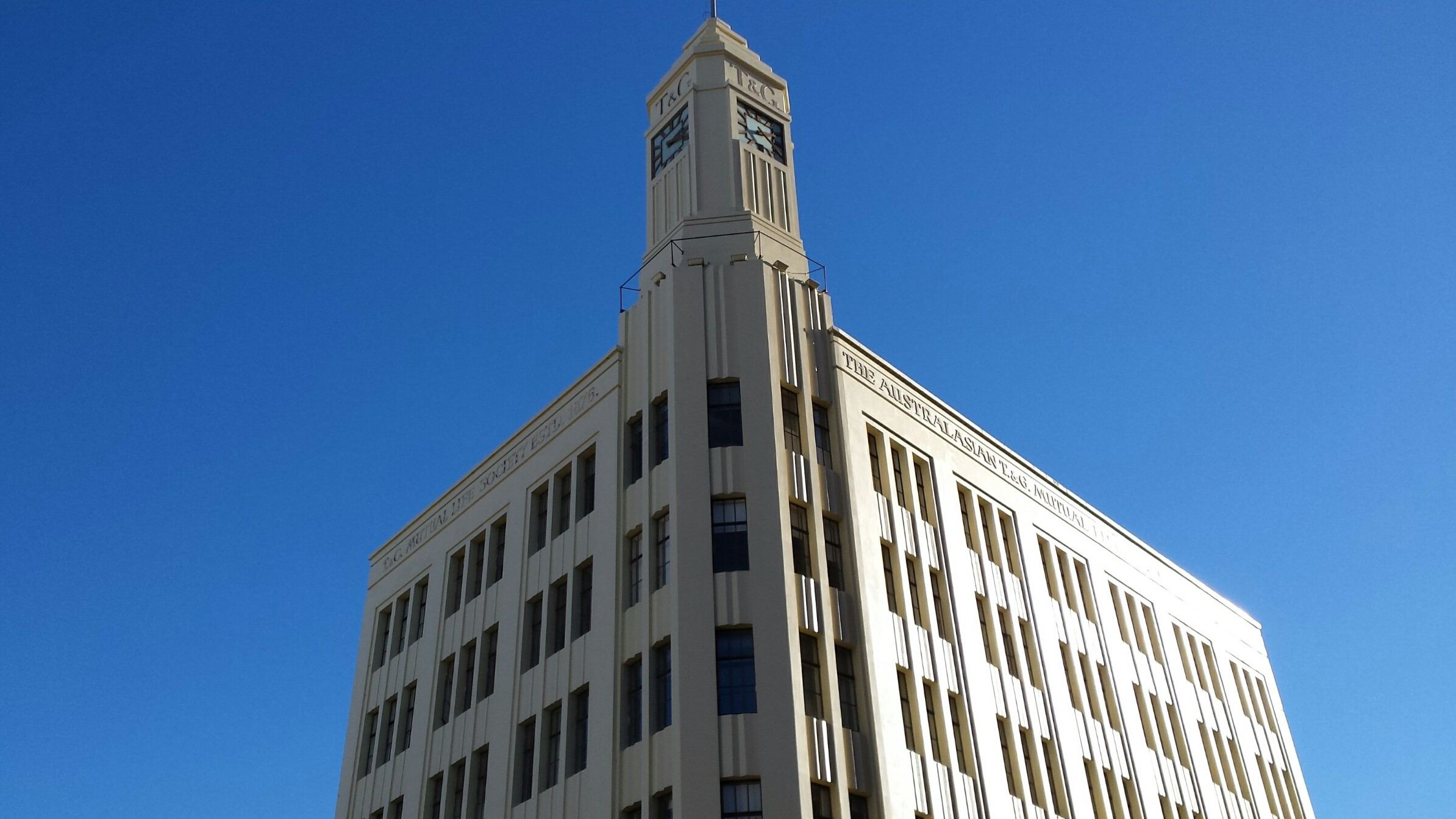
T&G Building in Hobart

The T & G Mutual Life Assurance Society was an insurance company that operated in Australia and New Zealand. The 'T & G' stood for 'Temperance & General'. The company was founded in Victoria in 1876, emerging from the Assurance branch of the Independent Order of Rechabites with 132 policies. The branch was severed from the I.O.R. after six years of operations.

By 1920, the society had 385,000 policies and by 1930 had grown to become the largest ordinary-industrial life society operating solely within Australia and New Zealand, with 737,000 policies, with an income of nearly £4 million, and assets totaling over £16 million. By 1952 the income had increased to £16 million and funds to £86 million.

In 1983 the T&G Society amalgamated with National Mutual, which was itself purchased by Axa in the 1990s.

== The T&G Buildings ==
The T&G Mutual Life Assurance Society was notable amongst Australian insurance companies for expanding its reach and visibility with a building program of 20 similar landmark buildings in cities and town across Australia and New Zealand in the interwar period. Other insurance companies also built numerous office buildings in many cities, but fewer in number or not all in matching style. Colonial Mutual built about eight matching office blocks across Australasia and South Africa (designed by Hennessy & Hennessy), while AMP built far more, but in various styles over many decades.

In the boom years of the 1880s the T&G built prominent headquarters in Melbourne and Sydney, the Melbourne one on Swanston Street on the north side of the Melbourne Town Hall, and another even larger one in Sydney on Elizabeth Street on the corner of Park Street, overlooking Hyde Park. In 1908 T&G purchased the large, ornate Edwardian Moirs Chambers in St Georges Terrace, Perth for its branch there, and had a presence in other cities and towns.

Starting in the mid 1920s, T&G buildings appeared in all the capital cities and numerous regional centres across Australia and New Zealand, the majority of which featured a landmark tower with a distinctive stepped top and the company's name in a kind of corporate advertising. All but one were designed by the Melbourne firm of A & K Henderson, those of the 1920s designed in a matching 'modern classical' style, which evolved into a more varied vertical Art Deco style in the 1930s. The towers often made them the most prominent buildings in the smaller towns, and the Melbourne and Sydney T&G buildings were amongst the largest, most prominent, interwar commercial buildings in both cities.

In the postwar years, the T&G continued this program, but in the form of more typical modernist office towers, branded mainly by the prominent signage.

All except four of the interwar T&G buildings still exist, and are often still landmarks in many towns and cities across Australasia.

== List of T & G buildings ==
=== Interwar period ===
==== Australia ====
- Brisbane (1924) – T & G Building, Brisbane, cnr Albert and Queen Streets, A&K Henderson 9th mansard level added 1936, also by A&K Henderson, and demolished c. 1970
- Adelaide (1925) – cnr King William and Grenfell Streets, A&K Henderson As of 2016 operated as the Quest on King William Hotel
- Bendigo (1925) – 31-33 View Street, A&K Henderson
- Rockhampton (1928) – William Street, A&K Henderson
- Melbourne (1929) – cnr Collins and Russell Streets, extended 1939 to the west with new tower, and 1959 to the south, A&K Henderson
- Sydney (1930–1932) – cnr Elizabeth and Park Streets, north half with tower completed 1930, southern in 1932, A&K Henderson, demolished c. 1976
- Geelong (1934) – T & G Building, Geelong, Cnr Ryrie and Moorabool Street A&K Henderson
- Mildura (1937) – cnr Eighth and Langtree Mall, A&K Henderson (alterations to an earlier building)
- Newcastle (1937) – T & G Mutual Life Assurance Building, cnr Hunter and Watt Streets, addition of two floors and alterations to earlier building, A&K Henderson
- Hobart (1938) – cnr Collins and Murray Streets, A&K Henderson

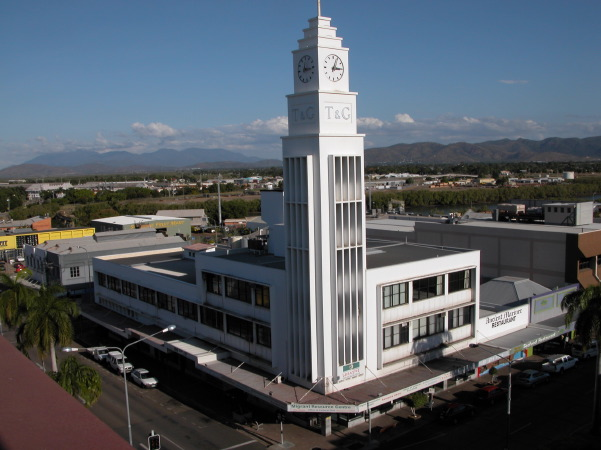
T&G Townsville, completed 1959, demolished 2008

- Horsham (1940) – cnr McLachlan and Firebrace Streets, A&K Henderson
- Warrnambool (1940) – cnr Liebig and Lava Streets, A&K Henderson
- Albury (1940) – 553 Dean Street, tower front designed by A&K Henderson added to an earlier building
- Wagga Wagga (c. 1941) – cnr Fitzmaurice and Gurwood streets; alteration of an earlier building
- Townsville (1959) – T&G Building, Townsville, cnr Flinders and Stanley Streets, A&K Henderson; designed in 1939, not built until well after the war, demolished 2008

==== New Zealand ====
- Christchurch (1926) – cnr Hereford and Liverpool Streets, A&K Henderson with Alsop & Martin. Last known as Kenton Chambers, and demolished in 2011 following the 2011 Christchurch earthquake
- Wellington (1928) – cnr Lambton Quay and Grey Street, A&K Henderson with Atkins & Mitchell as supervising architects; now known as Harcourt's Building
- Auckland (1929) – cnr Wellesley and Elliott Streets, alteration by A&K Henderson of a 1909 warehouse
- Napier (1936) – cnr Marine Parade and Emerson Street, Mitchell & Mitchell architects of Wellington
- Palmerston North (1938) – 16-22 Broadway, A&K Henderson

=== Postwar ===
- Dunedin, New Zealand (1956) –
- Hamilton (c. 1962) – 149 Alexandra Street
- Perth (1960) – altered 1980s, now known as Citibank House
- Darwin (c. 1970) –
- Brisbane (1970) – replaced the earlier building
- Sydney (1978) – replaced the earlier building with a 40-storey tower

== See also ==
- T & G Building, Brisbane
- T & G Building, Geelong
- T & G Building, Perth
- T & G Building, Townsville
- T & G Building, Wellington
