= Kingsley Henderson =

Australian architect and businessman

Kingsley Henderson CMG
- Born: 15 December 1883; Brighton, Victoria, Australia
- Died: 6 April 1942 (aged 58); Portsea, Victoria, Australia
- Occupation: Architect
- Spouse: Ruve Cutts Poolman (m. 1909)

Kingsley Anketell Henderson CMG (15 December 1883 – 6 April 1942) was an Australian architect and businessman. He ran a successful firm in Melbourne that specialised in commercial buildings. He was involved in the creation of the United Australia Party (UAP), holding office in its organisational wing in Victoria, and served on the Malvern City Council.

== Early life ==
Henderson was born on 15 December 1883 in Brighton, Victoria. He was one of four children born to Mary Louisa (née Andrew, died October 1934), and Anketell Matthew Henderson (3 March 1853 – 1922). His mother was born in England and his father, also an architect, was born in Ireland and came out to Australia as a child and was educated at Scotch College and completed the Engineering degree with the University of Melbourne. He became a partner in the architectural firm of Reed, Henderson & Smart, who did work for the university and for the Bank of Australasia, later setting up on his own account with offices at 352 Collins Street. He also served as lecturer in architecture at the university from 1892 to 1916.

Henderson was a grandson of Rev. Anketell Matthew Henderson (1820–1876), an English Congregational minister later associated with the Independent church on Collins Street, Melbourne. The name "Anketell" honors an early benefactor of the Rev. Henderson.

Henderson was educated at Cumloden College in St Kilda East. He later took classes at the University of Melbourne and Melbourne Technical College.

== Career ==
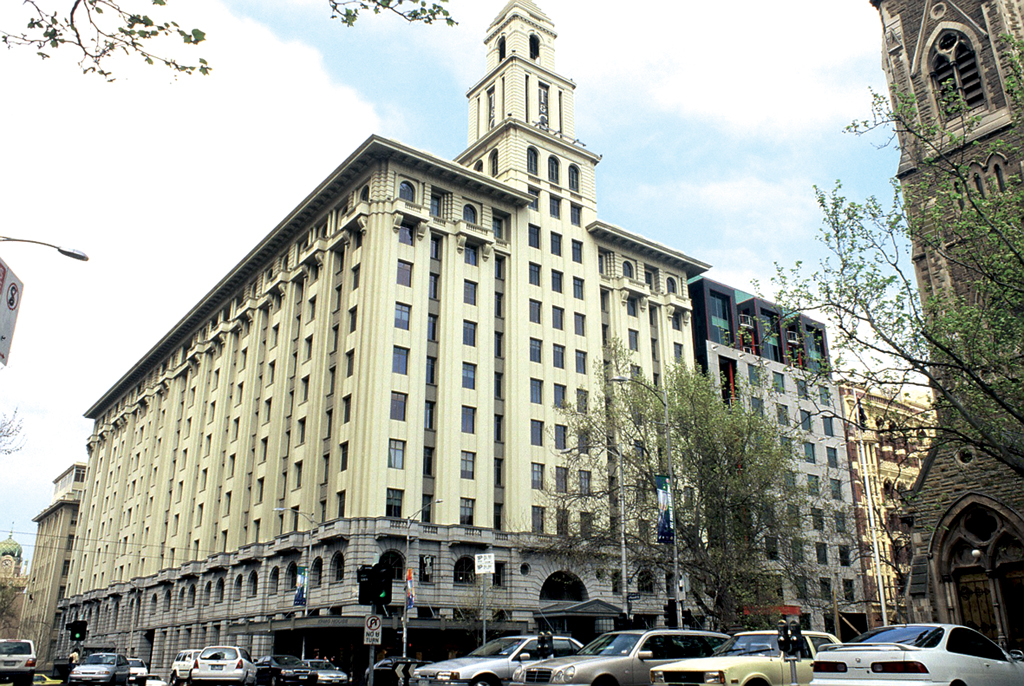
Melbourne head office of the T & G Mutual Life Assurance Society, designed by Henderson's firm

Henderson was articled to his father in 1901 and in 1906 joined him as a partner, with the firm generally known as A. & K. Henderson. His father died in 1922, the name remained unchanged, though he was later joined in partnership by Rodney Alsop and Marcus Martin. After his own death the practice was carried on by Cedric Staughton until the early 1960s. Henderson was a fellow of the Royal Australian Institute of Architects (RAIA) and Royal British Institute of Architects. He served twice as president of the Federal Council of the RAIA and twice as president of the Royal Victorian Institute of Architects (RVIA). He later became chairman of the Architects' Registration Board of Victoria and also lectured in architecture at the University of Melbourne.

Henderson "placed great emphasis on the functional and commercial aspect of city office planning, being especially adept at achieving the maximum natural light and space to let". His practice specialised in commercial office buildings but also designed for universities, hospitals and some residential clients, receiving work across Australia and New Zealand. It won a number of architectural awards and competitions, including two RVIA medals for street architecture – one in 1931 for Lyric House on Collins Street, Melbourne, and another in 1935 for Shell Corner at the intersection of Bourke Street and William Street. Henderson himself specialised in the functional requirements of office buildings, with others contributing the façades. The firm developed a house style for the T & G Mutual Life Assurance Society, building offices across ten cities. In Wellington, the company designed the T & G Building and a new building for the D.I.C. department store.

== Other interests ==
Henderson held a number of company directorships, including Argus and Australasian Ltd (holding company of The Argus and The Australasian), stockbroking firm Were's, investment trusts National Reliance and Capel Court (Aust) Ltd, and the Australian subsidiaries of Eagle Star Insurance and the Chevron Corporation. He was elected chairman of Argus and Australasian in 1940.

In 1917, Henderson was elected to the Malvern City Council, serving until 1922. He was a member of the panel (with Sir John Monash and G. Goodsell (federal president, Institute of Architects), to select design for a war memorial in Melbourne, won by the Shrine of Remembrance of Hudson and Wardrop. Philip Hudson had been articled to Anketell Henderson in the early 1900s.

He had a long history of involvement in the organisational wings of various movements opposed to the Australian Labor Party (ALP). He was a fiscal conservative, opposing default on government debts during the Great Depression. In February 1931, Henderson became secretary of the Australian Citizens' League, which soon became the Victorian branch of the All for Australia League and claimed 70,000 members. He was the final member of the so-called "Group of Six" that helped convince former ALP minister Joseph Lyons to lead a new political party, the United Australia Party (UAP). He became a close friend of Lyons, prime minister from 1932, and Lyons frequently stayed with him when he visited Melbourne. He was a pallbearer at Lyons' funeral in 1939.

After the formation of the UAP, Henderson became president of the party's Victorian branch. However, he resigned the position after only a few months in protest at the parliamentary UAP's decision to accept the Premiers' Plan. He was reportedly asked to stand as a candidate at the 1935 Fawkner by-election, but declined for business reasons.

== Personal life ==
Henderson married Ruve Cutts Poolman in 1909. The couple had no children. He died suddenly at his vacation home in Portsea, Victoria, on 7 April 1942, at the age of 58.

Henderson was appointed Companion of the Order of St Michael and St George (CMG) in 1937. He was president of the Melbourne Savage Club from 1933 to 1939.

== Eulogy ==
Vale: Kingsley Henderson

Great, splendid heart, they tell me you have gone;
That I shall never know again the warmth.
The light, the unfailing magic of your presence;
That not again in talk, and song, and silence
Shall we to dear companionship return.

Friend of so many friends, strong man of action,
Gay, laughing jester, sternest counsellor,
So shall your memory live where men forgather,
So shall your name give fragrance to the years.

The world is sweeter for your coming brother,
Fair be your going, and all quiet your rest.
Here in the shadow, death and sorrow scorning,
Stretch I my hand, Farewell until the morning.

William Tainsh (fellow "Savage")

== Gallery ==
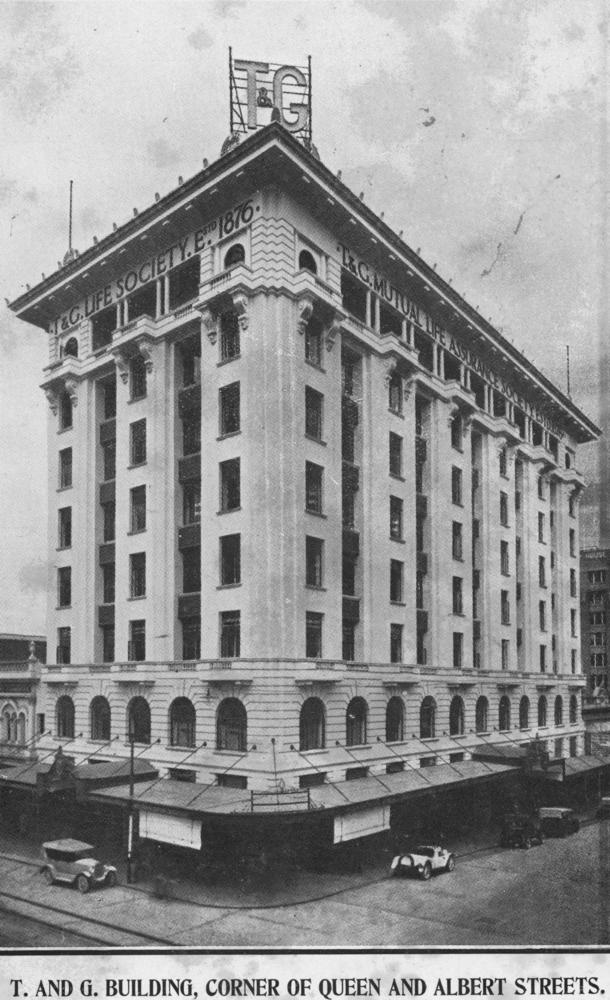
T&G Building Brisbane, 1924 (demolished)

T&G Building, Adelaide, 1925

National Bank HQ, Collins Street, 1927

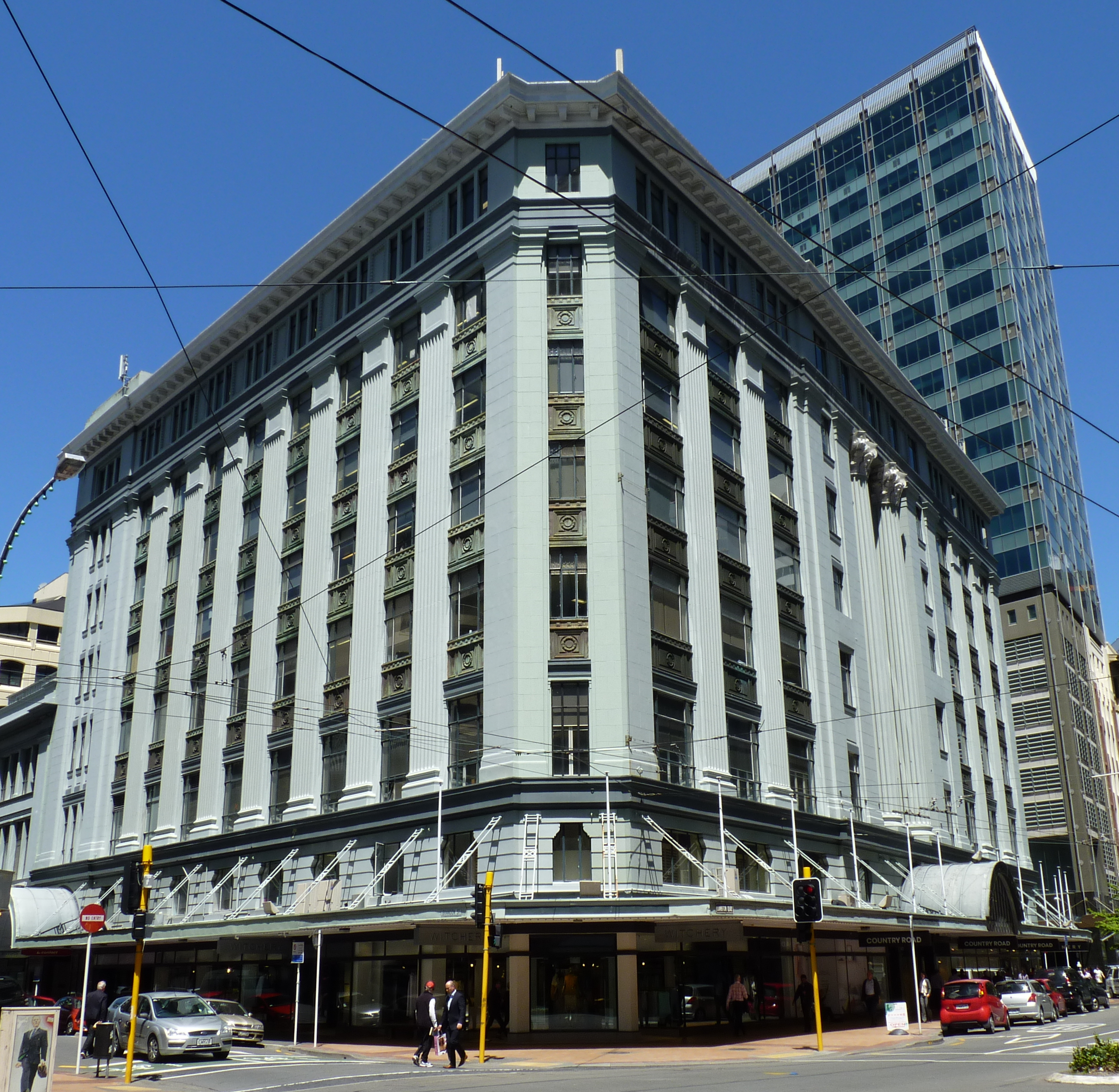
DIC Department Store Building, Wellington, New Zealand, 1928

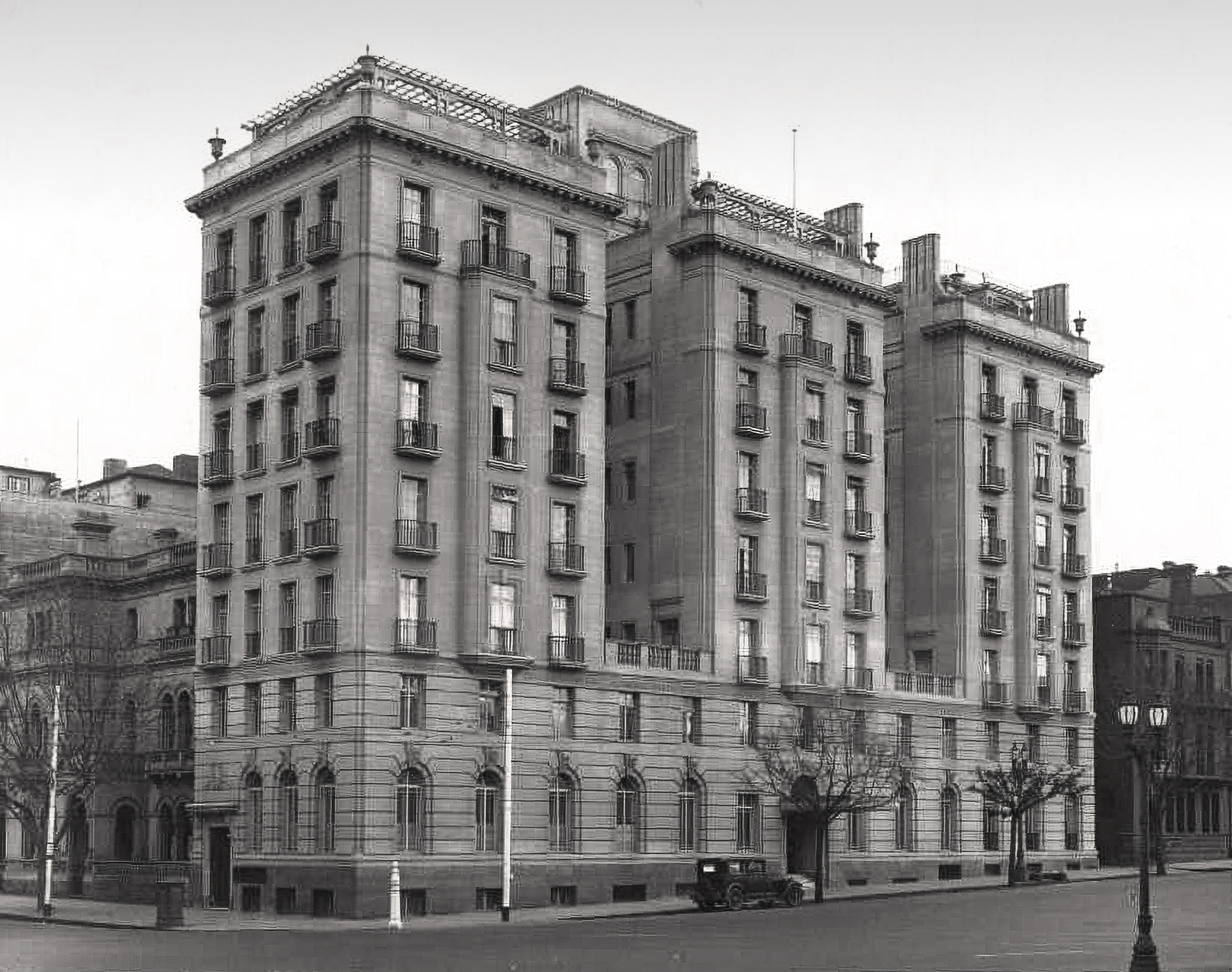
Alcaston House, Spring street, Melbourne 1930

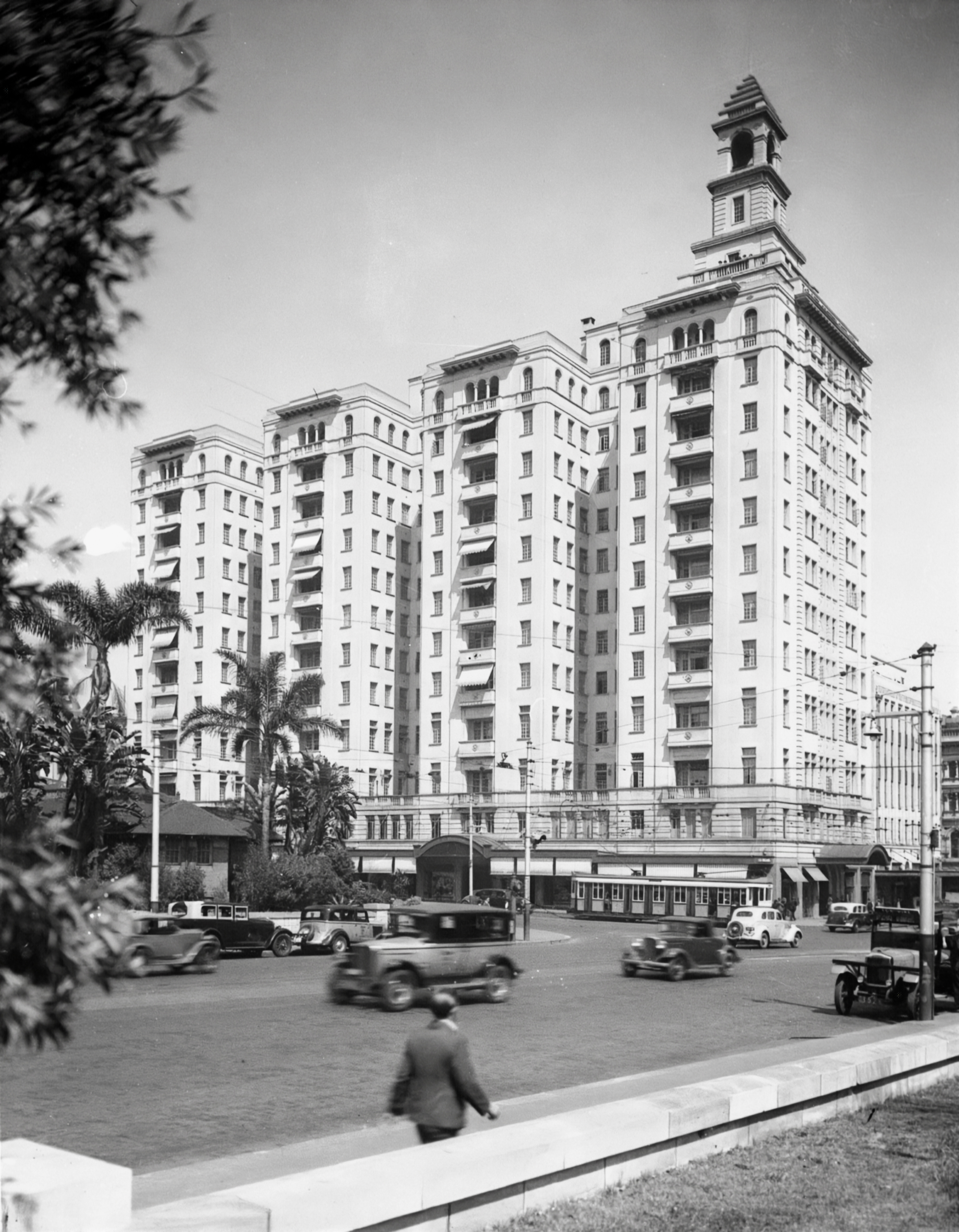
T&G Building, Elizabeth Street Sydney, 1930 (demolished)

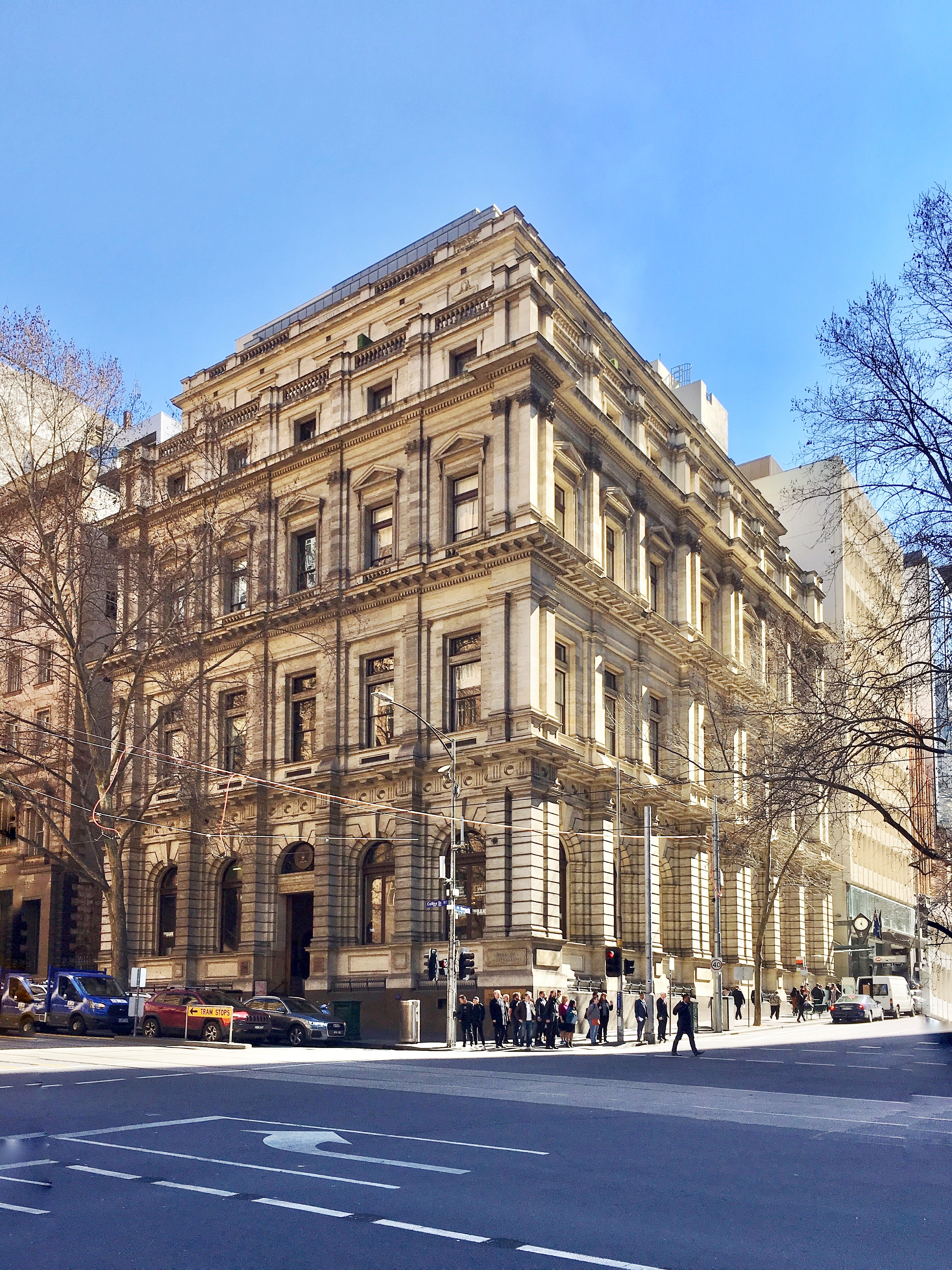
Bank of Australasia, Collins Street, top three floors added 1929

Lyric House, Collins Street, 1931

Charter House lobby, Bank Place, 1933

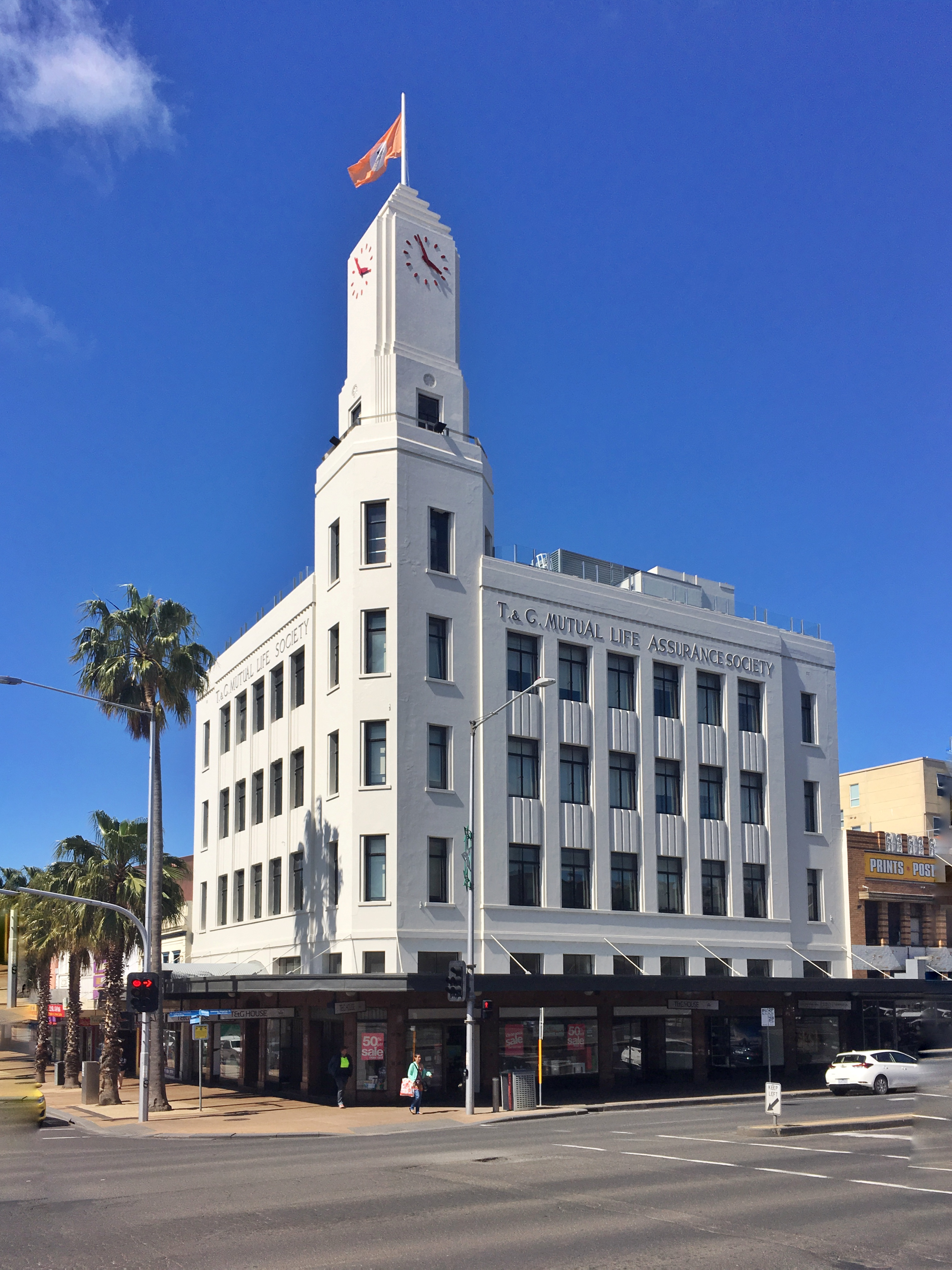
T&G Building, Geelong, 1934

National Bank, 81 Collins Street, 1934

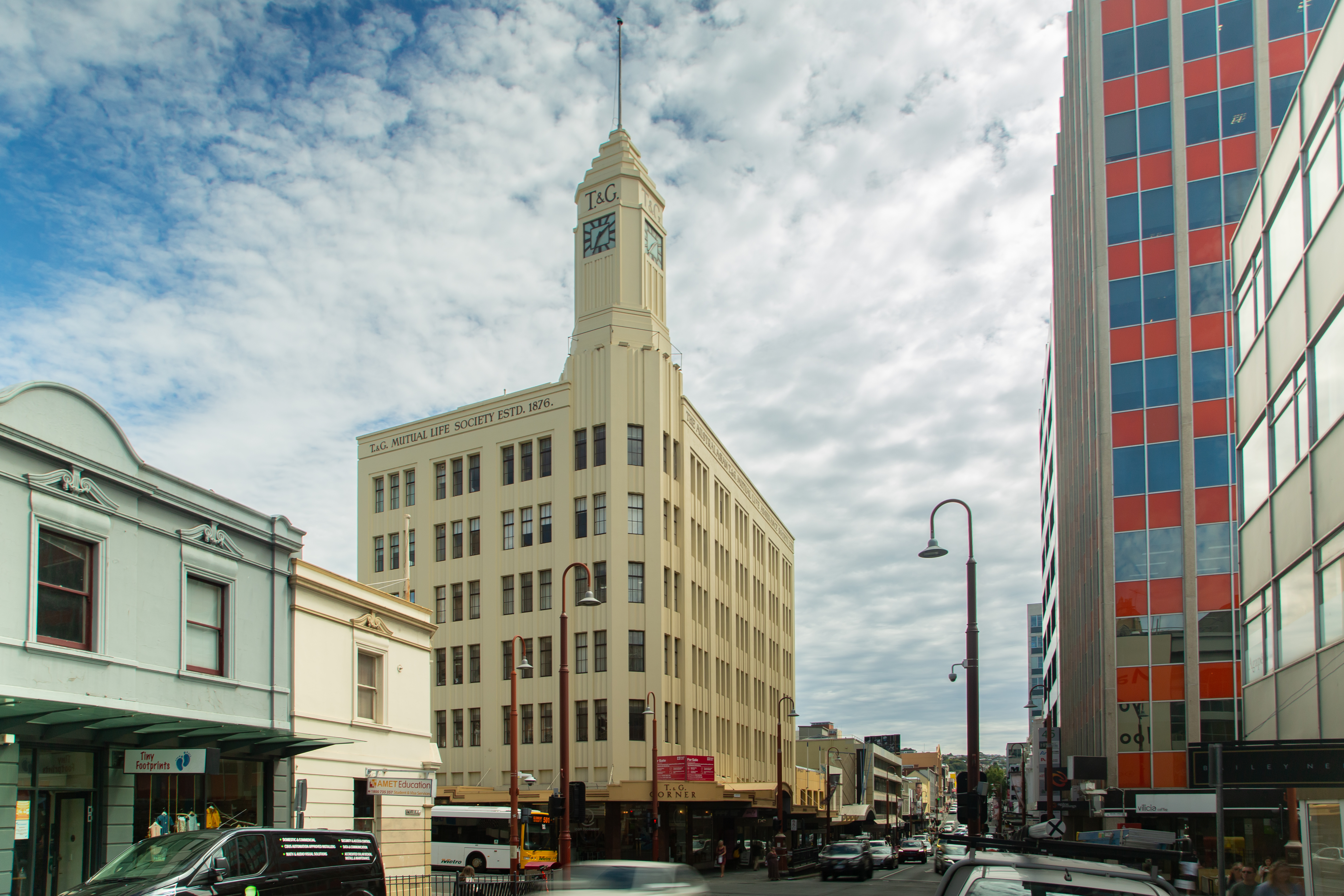
T&G Building, Murray Street Hobart,1937

T&G Palmerston North, New Zealand, 1938

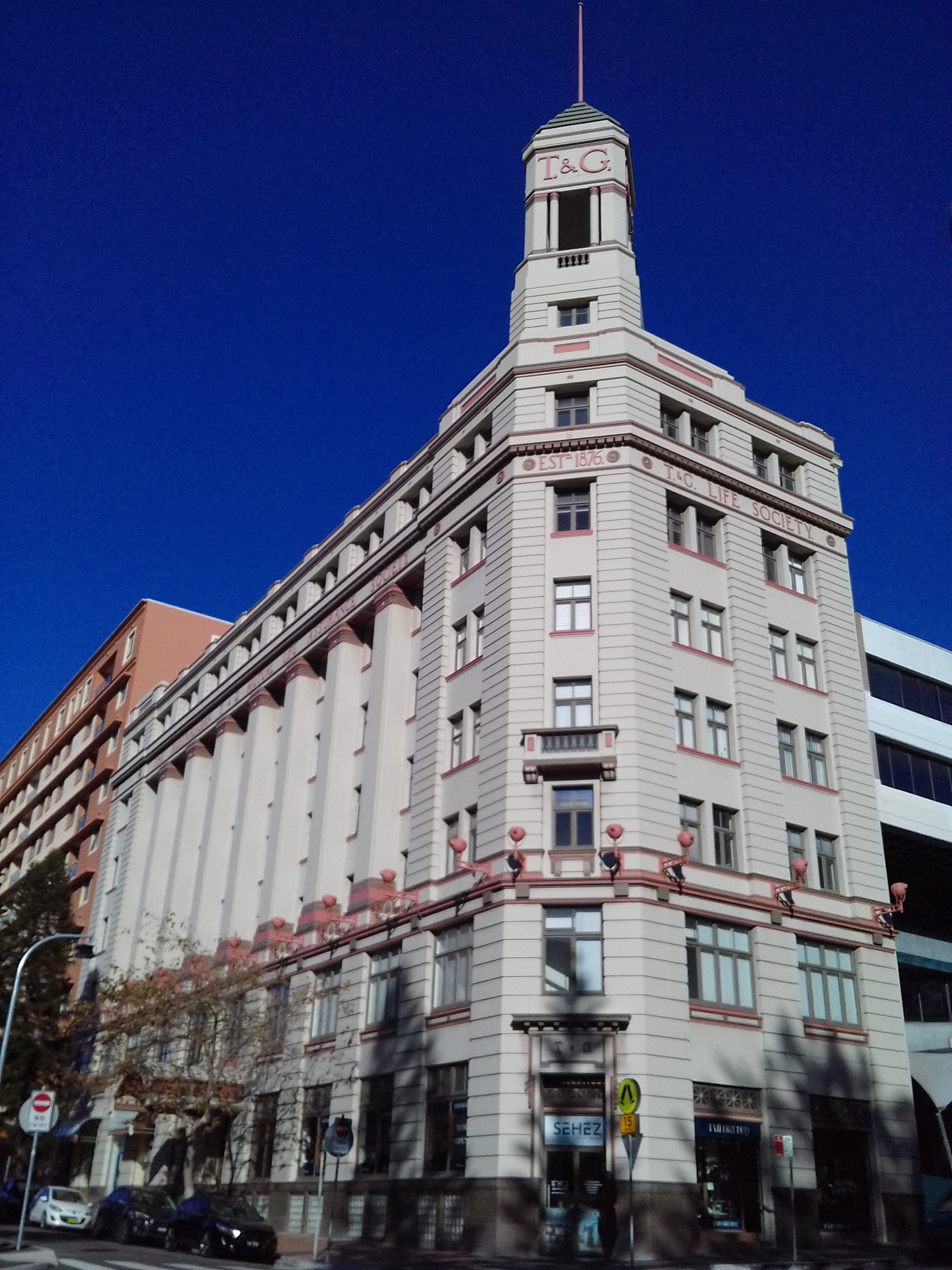
T&G Building Newcastle, 1937

Union Bank, Little Collins Street, 1938

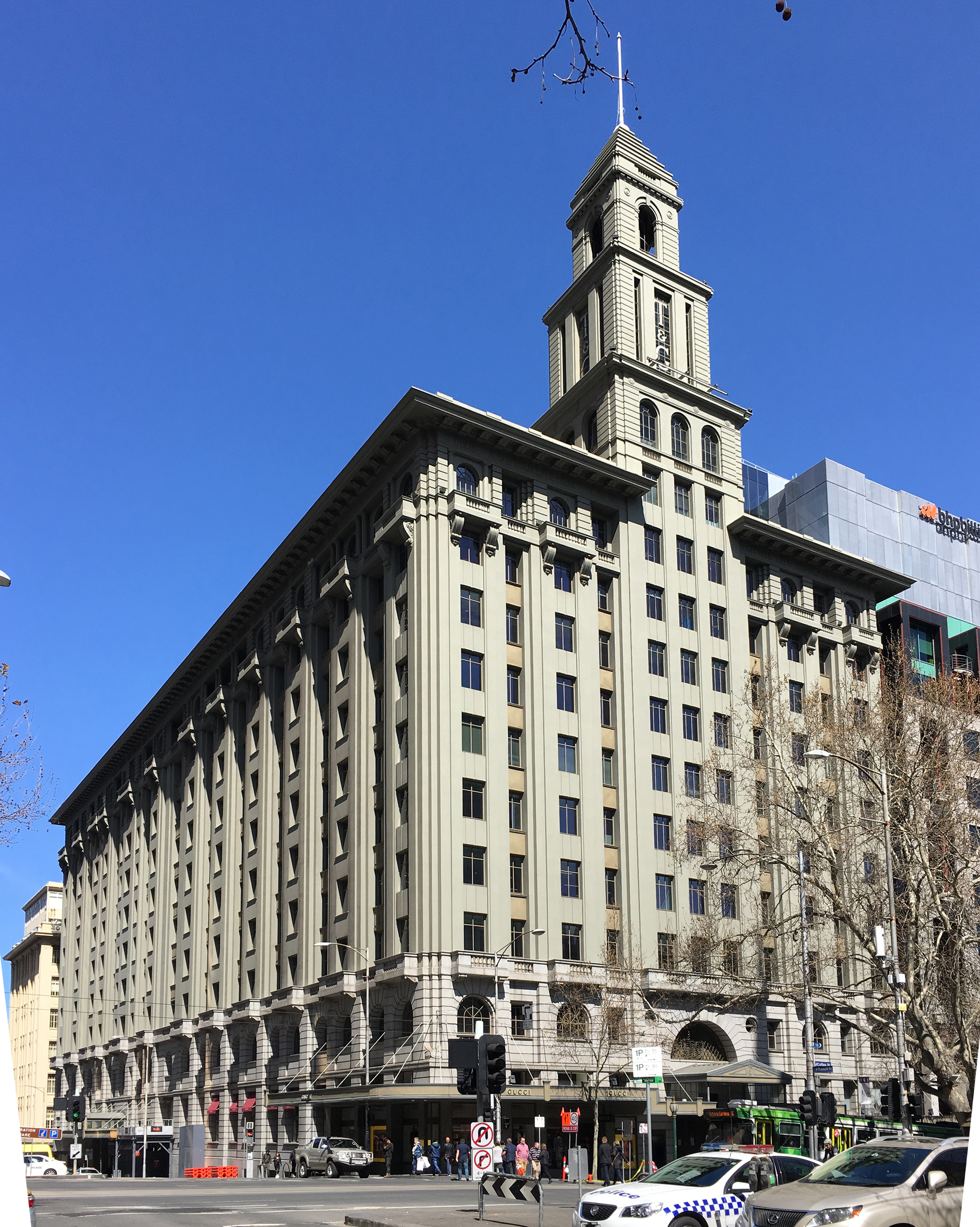
T&G Building, Collins Street, Melbourne, 1939

== See also ==
- A. M. Henderson, his grandfather, for some family relationships
