= T & G Building, Brisbane =

Building in Brisbane, Queensland

T & G Building
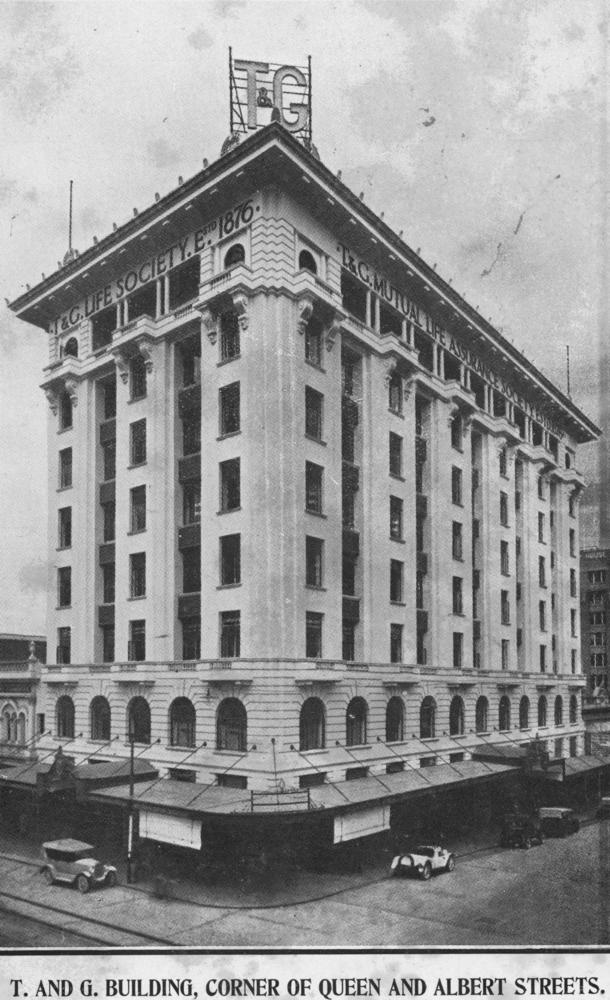
- T & G Building in 1926

- Location within Australia

General information
- Location: Brisbane, Australia
- Coordinates: 27°28′11.08″S 153°01′32.40″E

The T & G Building was a notable office tower located on the corner of Queen Street and Albert Street in Brisbane, Queensland, Australia, built for the T & G (Temperance and General) Mutual Life Assurance Society in 1924.

== Construction ==
The T & G was founded in Victoria in 1876, and by 1930 had grown to become the largest ordinary-industrial life society operating solely within Australia and New Zealand. In the mid 1920s, the T&G began to build landmark office blocks buildings in all the capital cities and numerous regional centres across Australia and New Zealand. The Brisbane building was the first of these, designed by the Melbourne firm of A & K Henderson, establishing a 'modern classical' style used into the 1930s. In 1936, a 9th mansard level added, also by A & K Henderson.

== Occupation during World War II ==
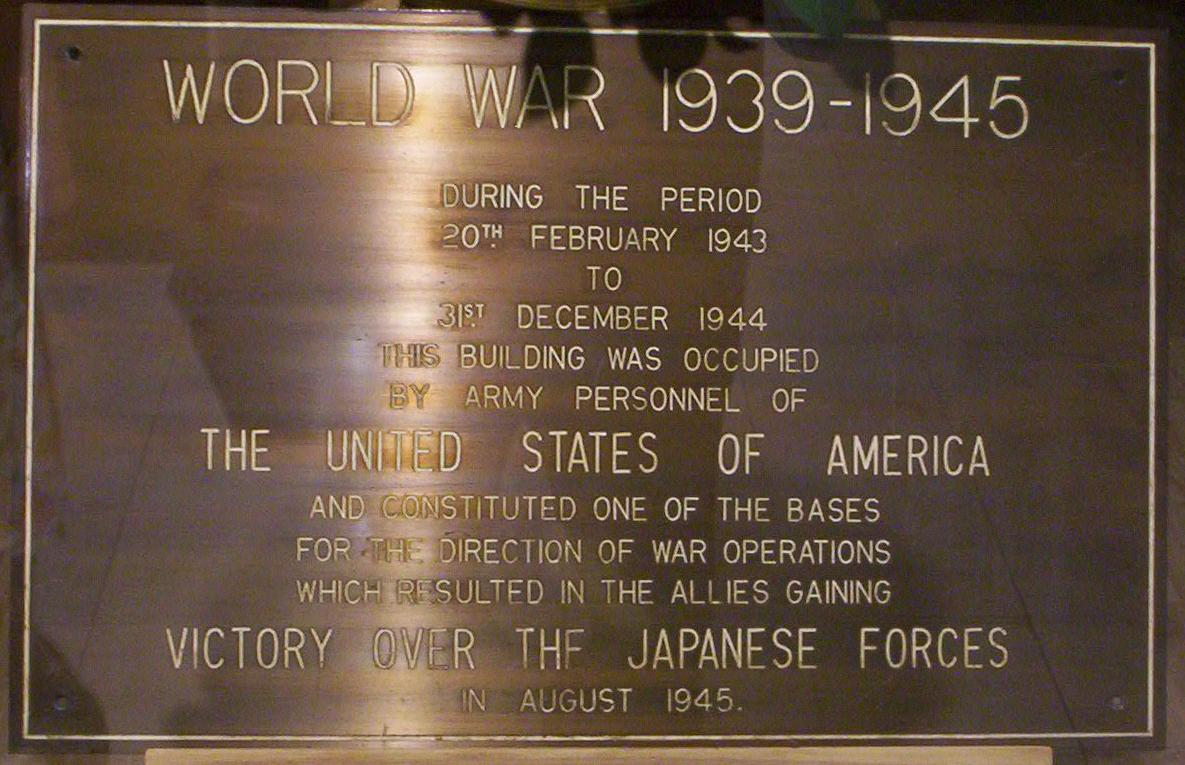
Plaque in ground floor display noting the WW2 occupation.

The building was taken over by Lieutenant Robert Melloy of the Hirings Section, No. 1 Lines of Communication (No. 1 L of C), Australian Army, and was occupied from 20 February 1943 to 31 December 1944. The tenants of the building resisted the occupation, led by a Dr Streeter, and they formed a committee to submit a protest to the Federal Government. Lt. Melloy agreed to help them submit their protest, on the condition that they vacate the premises immediately a decision was made. Two hours after submitting their protest, Lt. Melloy received orders to proceed with the military occupation of the building. Upon being advised by Lt. Melloy of the outcome, Dr. Streeter was one of the first to leave the building. The building was used as the Headquarters for the US Army Forces in the Far East.

== New T & G Building ==
In 1969, T & G replaced the original building with a modern office tower. It is 25 storeys tall, and at the time of its completion, was Brisbane's tallest building.

Today, the building houses a variety of businesses, including a doctors' surgery, and a hairdressing salon. Other businesses include a watch repairer and taxation accountant. An arcade was established at the ground level.

== See also ==
- T & G Mutual Life Assurance Society
- T & G Building, Geelong
