= Citibank House =

Office building in Perth, Western Australia

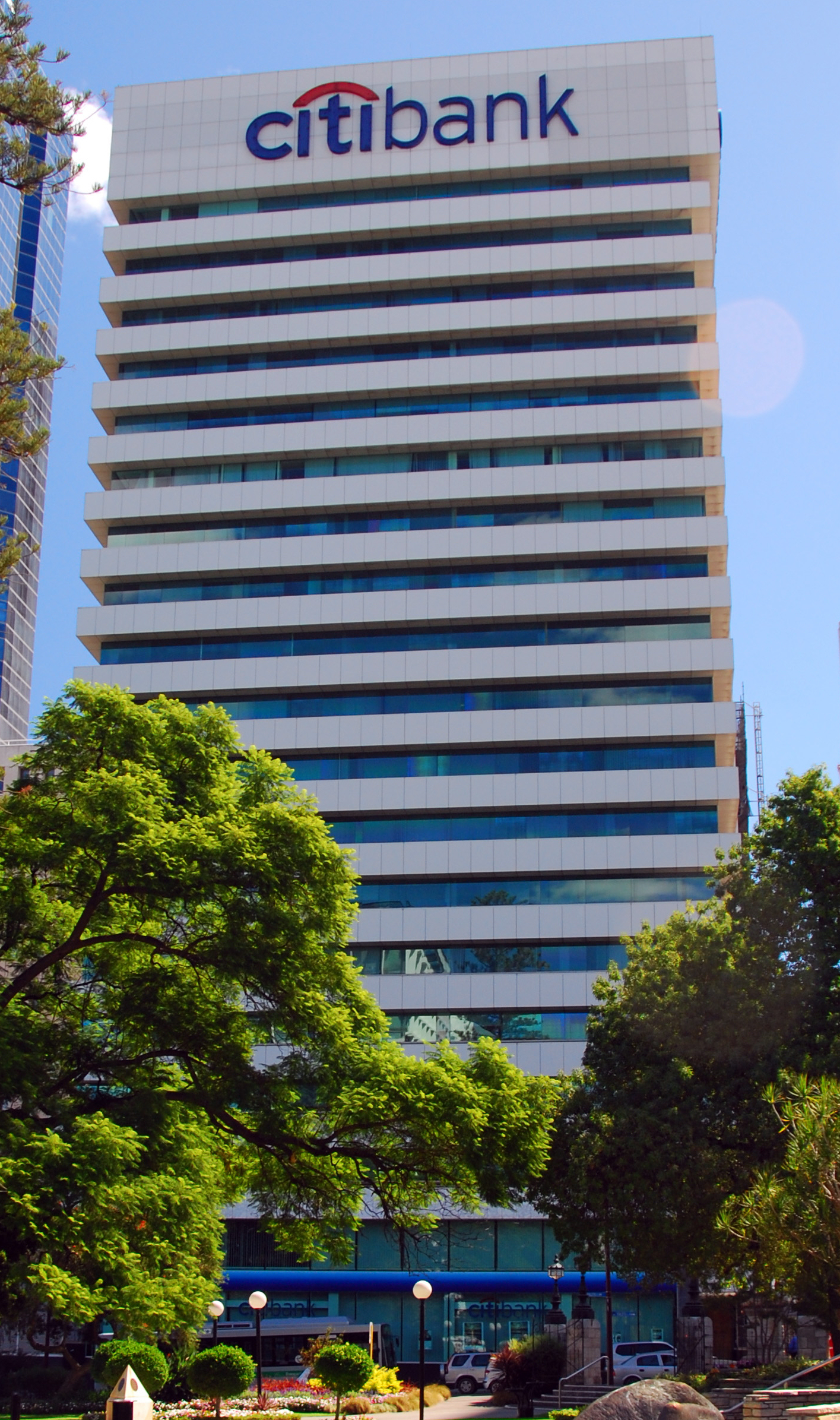
- Citibank House viewed from the east
- Interactive map of the Citibank House area

General information
- Type: Office tower
- Location: 37 St Georges Terrace, Perth, Western Australia
- Coordinates: 31°57′21″S 115°51′34″E
- Construction started: June 1960
- Completed: 1962
- Opening: 1962

Height
- Roof: 68 m (224 ft)

Technical details
- Floor count: 18
- Lifts/elevators: 4

Design and construction
- Architects: Forbes & Fitzhardinge
- Main contractor: J. Hawkins & Son

Citibank House is an 18-storey office building in St Georges Terrace, Perth, Western Australia. The 68-metre (224 ft) building was opened in 1962 as the T & G Building, and was the tallest building in Perth until 1970. (Note: In 1970, the T & G Building was surpassed as the tallest building in Perth by the 80-metre (260 ft), 20-storey Hamersley House at 191 St Georges Terrace, southeast of the intersection with Mill Street.) It underwent a major refurbishment in the 1980s which significantly altered the building's external features. The building adopted its current name when Citibank became its flagship tenant.

== Site history and construction ==
The site at the corner of St Georges Terrace and Barrack Street was occupied by hostelries from the colony's earliest days, and later housed the Weld Club.

During the Western Australian gold rush in 1897, the Moir Building was constructed on the site. Designed by Talbot Hobbs, the building was one of the most well-known buildings in Perth at the time. It later became the headquarters for the T & G Mutual Life Assurance Society and was renamed to the T & G Chambers. The southern end of the site was also home to the McNeil Chambers.

=== New T & G Building ===
Growth in T & G's business, coupled with a desire for a modern tower, led to the decision to demolish the iconic chambers. The original T & G Chambers were demolished in early 1960, and excavation for the new tower's foundation began in June 1960.

The high water table of the site necessitated the use of a raft-type foundation. The 1.2-metre-thick (4 ft) foundation was formed by the pour of 740 cubic metres (970 cu yd) of concrete in one continuous pour, which occurred on 25 September 1960. After this, a 53-centimetre (21 in) concrete retaining wall was poured around the basement levels and the steel frame of the building was erected. The floors of the building were formed by attaching permanent galvanised iron formwork to the steel frame, adding steel reinforcement mesh and pouring 10 centimetres (4 in) of concrete on top.

The building was the tallest in Perth upon its completion.

==== Design ====
The T & G Building was designed by architects Forbes & Fitzhardinge.

The service tower on the building's west side housed the tower's services, including its four high-speed lifts, a lift lobby, electricity, plumbing, toilets, tea room and two escape stairwells. The containment of the services within the service tower enabled the 390 square metres (4,200 sq ft) of office space on each floor to be contiguous. The service tower rose 8.31 m (27 ft 3 in) above the roof of the main building.

The building is of a steel frame construction, clad with aluminium, glass and precast aggregate concrete panels. The building is supported by 32 steel columns. The ground floor was clad with black polished granite, and the lobby featured Travertine marble.

The office floors had external sun shades 8.9 centimetres (3.5 in) thick protruding 0.91 metres (3 ft) from the side of the building to reduce the heat load of the building during summer.

The "fully automatic" lifts which were installed in the building were the most advanced in Australia.

A 12-metre (40 ft) steel flag pole (incorporating a lightning conductor) was placed on the northern end of the service tower.

== Refurbishment ==
When the T & G Building was constructed, there were no plot ratio limits imposed by the City of Perth on multistorey developments, and the building had a plot ratio of approximately 7:1. However, subsequent to the construction, a limit of 5:1 was imposed. As a result, in the 1980s when the tower was already outdated and showing signs of age, the owners found that they would be unable to replace the tower with a new one of a similar size. As a result, a decision was made to extensively refurbish the building.

The roof of the building, which previously featured a small caretaker's flat, was fully enclosed as an extra office floor. Above this, a facade was added bringing all sides of the building to the top of the mechanical penthouse which previously rose several floors above the roof. The window shades above every floor were enlarged and extended outwards from the building, and all window glass was replaced.

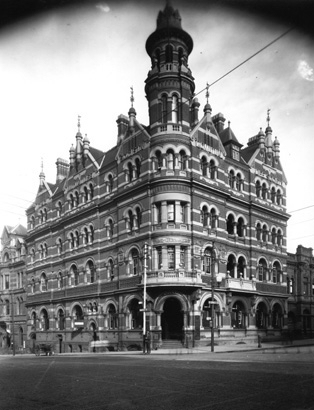
Old T & G Chambers in the 1920s

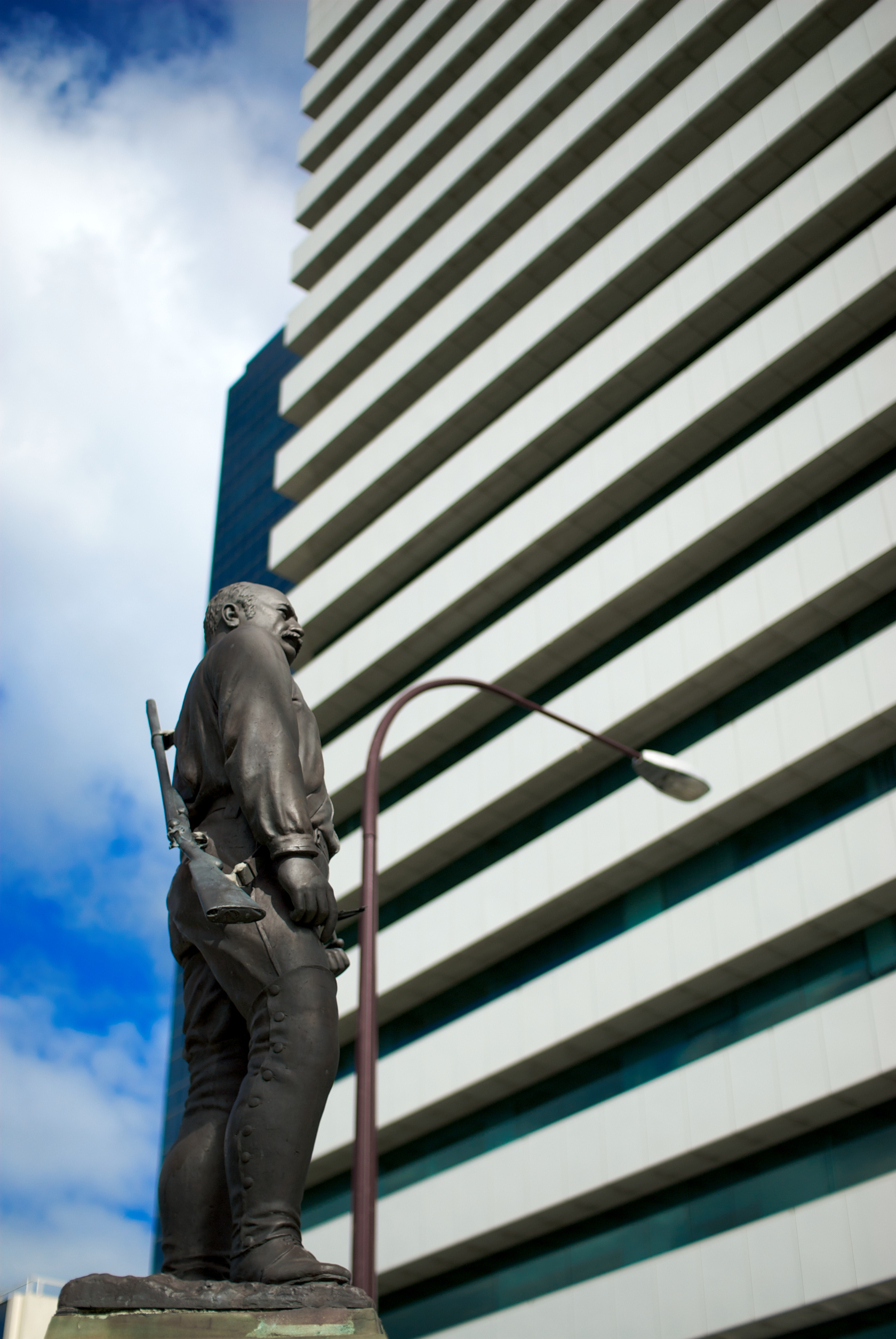
Building's prominent sun shades, seen behind statue of Alexander Forrest

== Sources ==
- "Citibank House, Perth". Emporis. 2007. Archived from the original on 9 March 2007.
- Hocking, Ian (1987). Perth: the Building Challenge. West Perth: Master Builders' Association of Western Australia. ISBN 0-9598935-3-9. OCLC 220657373.
- Progress Bulletin of the New T & G Building. Vol. 1. T & G Mutual Life Assurance Society. 20 August 1960.
- Progress Bulletin of the New T & G Building. Vol. 2. T & G Mutual Life Assurance Society. 20 September 1960.
- Progress Bulletin of the New T & G Building. Vol. 3. T & G Mutual Life Assurance Society. 20 October 1960.
- Progress Bulletin of the New T & G Building. Vol. 4. T & G Mutual Life Assurance Society. 1 December 1960.
- Progress Bulletin of the New T & G Building. Vol. 5. T & G Mutual Life Assurance Society. 27 January 1961.
- Progress Bulletin of the New T & G Building. Vol. 7. T & G Mutual Life Assurance Society. 10 April 1961.
- Progress Bulletin of the New T & G Building. Vol. 12. T & G Mutual Life Assurance Society. 17 November 1961.
- Progress Bulletin of the New T & G Building. Vol. 13. T & G Mutual Life Assurance Society. 1 February 1962.
