= T & G Mutual Life Assurance Building =

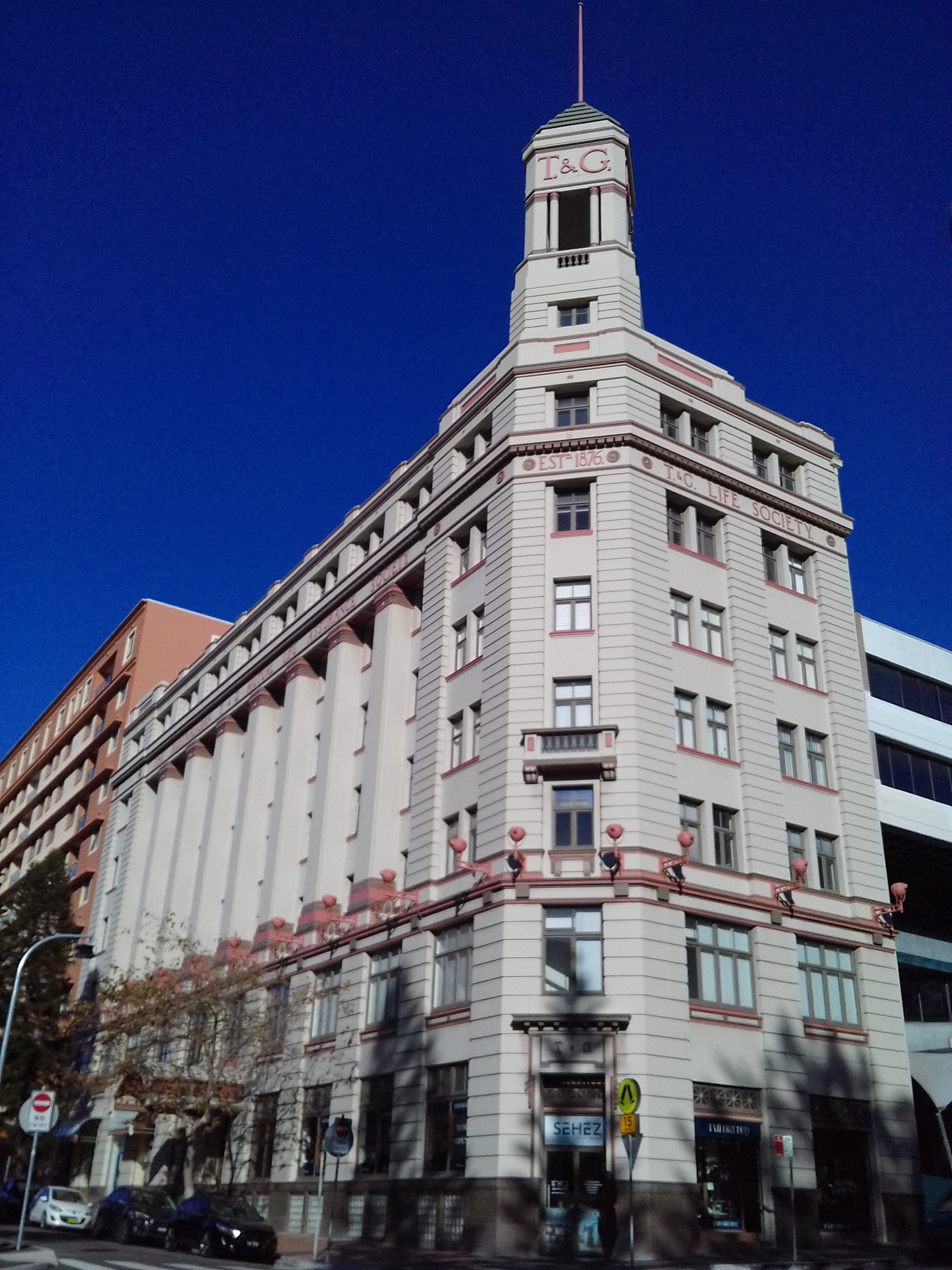

- Location within New South Wales Location within Australia
- 32.9281°S 151.7846°E
- Location: 45 Hunter Street, Newcastle, New South Wales, Australia

Site notes
- Architect: Spain and Cosh
- Owner: Cedtoy Pty Ltd

New South Wales Heritage Register
- Official name: T & G Mutual Life Assurance Building
- Type: state heritage (built)
- Designated: 2 April 1999
- Reference no.: 316
- Type: historic site

T & G Mutual Life Assurance Building is a heritage-listed office building at 45 Hunter Street, Newcastle, New South Wales, Australia.

== History ==
The building was built in 1923 for McIlwraith, McEacharn & Company and named Scottish House. It was designed by Spain and Cosh and built by contractors Stuart Brothers. The cost of the building and land amounted to approximately £100,000.

In 1935, it was bought by the T & G Mutual Life Assurance Society for approximately £90,000, in what was then the biggest sale of any single freehold property in Newcastle.

In the early 1990s, the building was known as Hunter House.

== Description ==
The T & G Building is a seven-storey rendered brick building in the English Renaissance style with a corner tower. It originally consisted of five storeys with a basement, with an additional two floors added after the building was bought by T & G.

== Heritage listing ==
T & G Mutual Life Assurance Building was listed on the New South Wales State Heritage Register on 2 April 1999.
