= T & G Building, Geelong =

Coordinates: 38.1492°S 144.3602°E

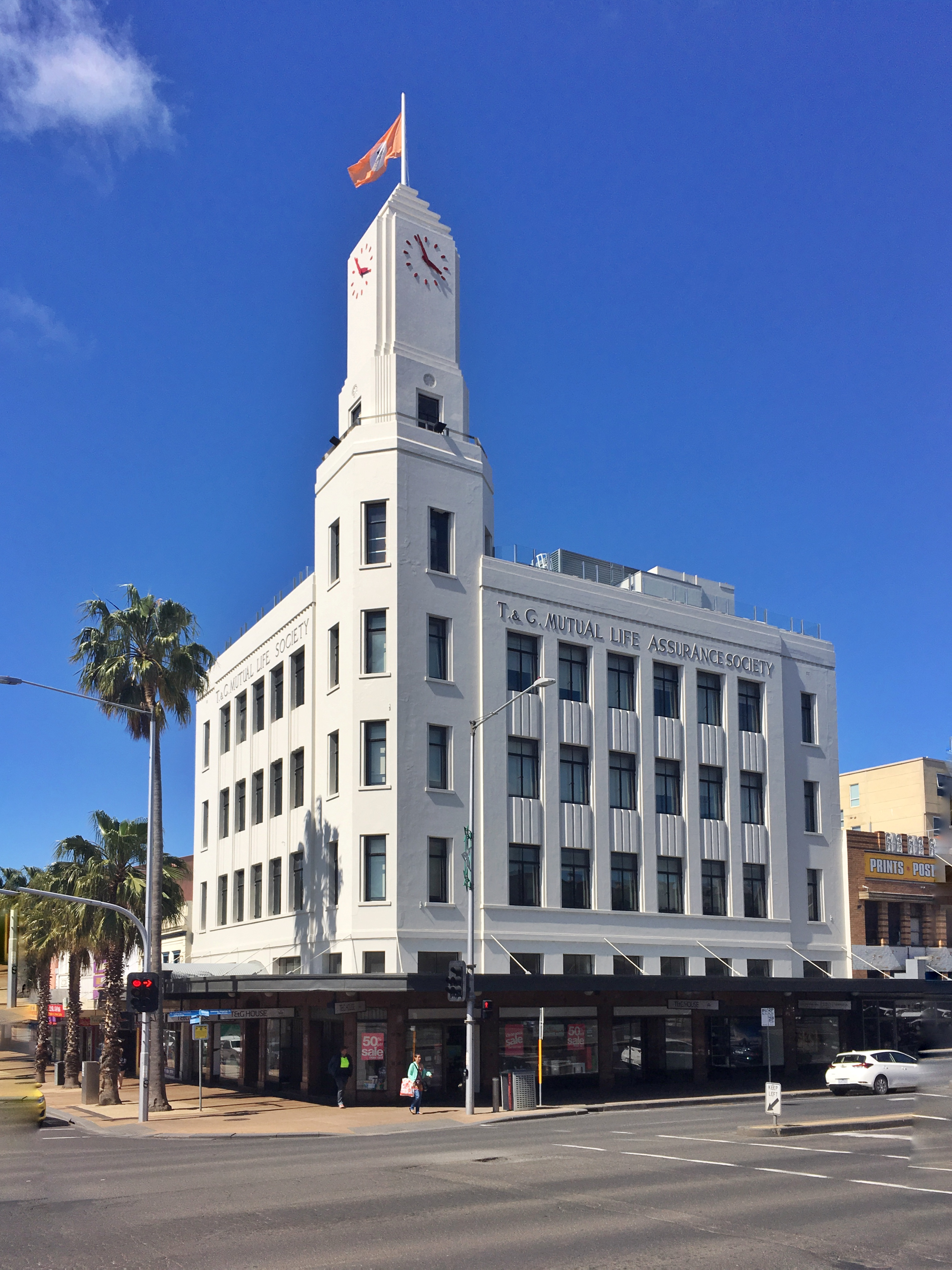
T & G building, Geelong in 2017

The T & G Building is a heritage listed landmark in Geelong, Victoria, Australia, on the corner of Moorabool and Ryrie Streets. The building's style is a blend of Art Deco and Classicism. Both of those styles can be noted in the buildings geometric grooves, vertical lines and stepped form. The exterior of the ground floor features chevron grill patterns, that is characteristic of Art Deco architecture.

Construction was announced by the T & G Mutual Life Assurance Society in June 1933, partly with the idea of stimulating employment while Geelong was still suffering the effects of the Great Depression. The building cost AU£37,000 ($74,000, about $8,000,000 today) and was completed in 1934.

In June 1934, the unique "Father and Son" clock was switched on. As well as having the usual four clock faces at the top of the tower, the mechanism includes two life-sized cast bronze figures of a farmer and his son, in typical period farm-workers' dress, who emerge from a window in the south side of the upper section the tower and strike the hour on large bell they are both holding. They symbolise a father handing over responsibility to his son, and urging him to continue the good work.

By the mid-1990s, the building had fallen into disrepair, the clock was unreliable, and the Father and Son no longer appeared to strike the hour. A public campaign led by the Geelong Advertiser resulted in the repainting of the building and the clock being repaired.

Much of the ground floor was vacant during 2012, but the building was bought and restored by Dean Montgomery and his brother. In mid-2014, it was purchased by Deakin University to use as student accommodation. The conversion of the building into 33 studio apartments and common areas was commissioned to Studio 101 Architects in Geelong and built by Nicholson Construction.

The university authorities decided to de-activate the father and son striking the hour because they were advised that the mechanism was unsafe, and also felt the striking of the bell was not compatible with the use of the building as student accommodation.

== See also ==
- T & G Building, Brisbane
- T & G Mutual Life Assurance Society
