= Electoral results for the district of Nedlands =

Western Australian district election results

This is a list of electoral results for the electoral district of Nedlands in Western Australian state elections from the district's creation in 1929 until the present.

== Members for Nedlands ==
Member	Party	Term
Norbert Keenan	Nationalist	1930–1947
Norbert Keenan	Liberal	1947–1950
David Grayden	Independent Liberal	1950–1953
Charles Court	Liberal	1953–1982
Richard Court	Liberal	1982–2001
Sue Walker	Liberal	2001–2008
Sue Walker	Independent	2008
Bill Marmion	Liberal	2008–2021
Katrina Stratton	Labor	2021–2025
Jonathan Huston	Liberal	2025–present

== Election results ==
=== Elections in the 2020s ===
==== 2025 ====
2025 Western Australian state election: Nedlands
Party	Candidate	Votes	%	±%
Liberal	Jonathan Huston	12,533	44.5	+9.6
Labor	Mary Monkhouse	6,977	24.8	−11.2
Greens	Viv Glance	4,065	14.4	+0.8
Independent	Rosemarie de Vries	2,524	9.0	+9.0
Independent	Cilla de Lacy	908	3.2	+3.2
One Nation	Alex Ironside	429	1.5	+1.5
Christians	Laura Yow	427	1.5	+1.5
Independent	Jonathan Hippisley	181	0.6	+0.6
Independent	Peter D. Dunne	129	0.5	+0.5
Total formal votes		28,173	97.4	−0.2
Informal votes		752	2.6	+0.2
Turnout		28,925	88.5	+4.1
Two-party-preferred result
Liberal	Jonathan Huston	14,845	52.7	+5.8
Labor	Mary Monkhouse	13,314	47.3	−5.8
Liberal gain from Labor		Swing	+5.8	

==== 2021 ====
2021 Western Australian state election: Nedlands
Party	Candidate	Votes	%	±%
Labor	Katrina Stratton	9,327	35.7	+9.1
Liberal	Bill Marmion	9,160	35.0	−16.6
Greens	Tamara Alderdice	3,549	13.6	−1.9
Independent	Fiona Argyle	2,883	11.0	+11.0
Independent	Andrew Mangano	632	2.4	+2.4
No Mandatory Vaccination	Vivien Forrest	412	1.6	+1.6
WAxit	Dennis Jennings	179	0.7	−0.7
Total formal votes		26,142	97.6	+0.8
Informal votes		648	2.4	−0.8
Turnout		26,790	88.4	+1.2
Two-party-preferred result
Labor	Katrina Stratton	13,805	52.8	+10.8
Liberal	Bill Marmion	12,330	47.2	−10.8
Labor gain from Liberal		Swing	+10.8	

=== Elections in the 2010s ===
==== 2017 ====
2017 Western Australian state election: Nedlands
Party	Candidate	Votes	%	±%
Liberal	Bill Marmion	12,093	51.9	−6.5
Labor	Penny Taylor	6,125	26.3	+12.2
Greens	Daniel Grosso	3,641	15.6	+2.6
Matheson for WA	Andrew Mangano	608	2.6	+2.6
Christians	Christopher Shaw	525	2.3	+0.8
Micro Business	Keith Ginbey	329	1.4	+1.4
Total formal votes		23,321	96.8	+0.5
Informal votes		780	3.2	−0.5
Turnout		24,101	88.1	+1.4
Two-party-preferred result
Liberal	Bill Marmion	13,588	58.3	−10.9
Labor	Penny Taylor	9,728	41.7	+10.9
Liberal hold		Swing	−10.9	

==== 2013 ====
2013 Western Australian state election: Nedlands
Party	Candidate	Votes	%	±%
Liberal	Bill Marmion	12,351	58.4	+14.3
Labor	Tony Walker	2,987	14.1	–1.7
Independent	Max Hipkins	2,758	13.0	+13.0
Greens	George Crisp	2,752	13.0	–1.1
Christians	Gail Forder	316	1.5	+0.3
Total formal votes		21,164	96.2	−0.5
Informal votes		827	3.8	+0.5
Turnout		21,991	90.0	
Two-party-preferred result
Liberal	Bill Marmion	14,622	69.1	+2.5
Labor	Tony Walker	6,529	30.9	–2.5
Liberal hold		Swing	+2.5	

=== Elections in the 2000s ===
==== 2008 ====
2008 Western Australian state election: Nedlands
Party	Candidate	Votes	%	±%
Liberal	Bill Marmion	8,889	45.5	−8.3
Independent	Sue Walker	4,449	22.8	+22.8
Labor	Colin Cochrane	3,098	15.8	−10.2
Greens	Lee Hemsley	2,754	14.1	−1.8
Christian Democrats	Gail Forder	233	1.2	−1.3
Family First	Brian Langenberg	131	0.7	−1.0
Total formal votes		19,554	96.8	+0.3
Informal votes		656	3.2	−0.3
Turnout		20,210	85.51	−3.7
Notional two-party-preferred count
Liberal	Bill Marmion	12,954	66.3	+6.2
Labor	Colin Cochrane	6,597	33.7	–6.2
Two-candidate-preferred result
Liberal	Bill Marmion	10,266	52.5	−7.6
Independent	Sue Walker	9,280	47.5	+47.5
Liberal gain from Independent		Swing	N/A	

==== 2005 ====
2005 Western Australian state election: Nedlands
Party	Candidate	Votes	%	±%
Liberal	Sue Walker	12,912	51.89	+2.71
Labor	Chris Hondros	6,876	27.63	+8.56
Greens	Tom Wilson	3,944	15.85	+9.16
Christian Democrats	Gail Forder	707	2.84	+2.84
Family First	Brian Langenberg	446	1.79	+1.79
Total formal votes		24,885	96.45	−1.00
Informal votes		915	3.55	+1.00
Turnout		25,800	90.28	+2.23
Two-party-preferred result
Liberal	Sue Walker	14,533	58.43	−0.7
Labor	Chris Hondros	10,338	41.57	+0.7
Liberal hold		Swing	3.50	

==== 2001 by-election ====
Nedlands state by-election, 2001
Party	Candidate	Votes	%	±%
Liberal	Sue Walker	6,887	43.5	–5.7
Labor	Simon Corrigan	2,912	18.4	–0.7
Greens	Steve Walker	2,214	14.0	+7.3
Liberals for Forests	Robin Collin	1,928	12.2	–6.1
Democrats	Ashley Buckle	960	6.1	+2.8
One Nation	Bill Edgar	583	3.7	+1.0
Independent	Karen McDonald	254	1.6	+1.6
Independent	Frank Ash	93	0.6	+0.6
Total formal votes		15,831	97.7	+0.3
Informal votes		372	2.3	–0.3
Turnout		16,203	68.3	–19.8
Two-candidate-preferred result
Liberal	Sue Walker	8,439	53.4	–1.5
Greens	Steve Walker	7,362	46.6	+46.6
Liberal hold		Swing	–1.5	

==== 2001 ====
2001 Western Australian state election: Nedlands
Party	Candidate	Votes	%	±%
Liberal	Richard Court	9,948	49.2	−7.4
Labor	Neil Roberts	3,856	19.1	−0.8
Liberals for Forests	Liz Davenport	3,688	18.2	+18.2
Greens	Elena Jeffreys	1,353	6.7	−4.4
Democrats	Ashley Buckle	656	3.2	−4.6
One Nation	Bill Edgar	546	2.7	+2.7
Independent	Doug Greypower	181	0.9	+0.9
Total formal votes		20,228	97.4	+0.1
Informal votes		530	2.6	−0.1
Turnout		20,758	88.1	
Notional two-party-preferred count
Liberal	Richard Court	12,134	60.2	−4.6
Labor	Neil Roberts	8,007	39.8	+4.6
Two-candidate-preferred result
Liberal	Richard Court	11,079	54.9	−10.0
Liberals for Forests	Liz Davenport	9,089	45.1	+45.1
Liberal hold		Swing	−10.0	

=== Elections in the 1990s ===
==== 1996 ====
1996 Western Australian state election: Nedlands
Party	Candidate	Votes	%	±%
Liberal	Richard Court	11,429	56.6	−7.3
Labor	Neil Roberts	4,015	19.9	−0.5
Greens	Mark Lockett	2,247	11.1	+0.6
Democrats	Michael Barrett	1,577	7.8	+3.1
Independent	Michael Parks	915	4.5	+4.5
Total formal votes		20,183	97.3	+0.3
Informal votes		556	2.7	−0.3
Turnout		20,739	87.9	
Two-party-preferred result
Liberal	Richard Court	13,054	64.9	−5.4
Labor	Neil Roberts	7,073	35.1	+5.4
Liberal hold		Swing	−5.4	

==== 1993 ====
1993 Western Australian state election: Nedlands
Party	Candidate	Votes	%	±%
Liberal	Richard Court	11,831	64.3	+4.7
Labor	William Harman	3,641	19.8	−5.2
Greens	Elisabeth Jones	2,006	10.9	+10.9
Democrats	Fraser Pope	910	5.0	−3.9
Total formal votes		18,388	97.1	+1.8
Informal votes		555	2.9	−1.8
Turnout		18,943	91.8	+4.6
Two-party-preferred result
Liberal	Richard Court	12,995	70.7	+3.4
Labor	William Harman	5,393	29.3	−3.4
Liberal hold		Swing	+3.4	

=== Elections in the 1980s ===
==== 1989 ====
1989 Western Australian state election: Nedlands
Party	Candidate	Votes	%	±%
Liberal	Richard Court	10,824	59.5	−3.2
Labor	Ross Connell	4,539	25.0	−12.0
Democrats	Kevin Judd	1,616	8.9	+8.9
Grey Power	Douglas Ratcliffe	1,198	6.6	+6.6
Total formal votes		18,177	95.3	
Informal votes		905	4.7	
Turnout		19,082	87.2	
Two-party-preferred result
Liberal	Richard Court	12,243	67.3	+4.5
Labor	Ross Connell	5,934	32.7	−4.5
Liberal hold		Swing	+4.5	

==== 1986 ====
1986 Western Australian state election: Nedlands
Party	Candidate	Votes	%	±%
Liberal	Richard Court	9,886	64.9	+0.8
Labor	Ross Williamson	5,341	35.1	−0.8
Total formal votes		15,227	97.7	−0.3
Informal votes		357	2.3	+0.3
Turnout		15,584	89.1	+0.4
Liberal hold		Swing	+0.8	

==== 1983 ====
1983 Western Australian state election: Nedlands
Party	Candidate	Votes	%	±%
Liberal	Richard Court	8,945	64.1	
Labor	Saliba Sassine	5,011	35.9	
Total formal votes		13,956	98.0	
Informal votes		280	2.0	
Turnout		14,236	88.7	
Liberal hold		Swing		

==== 1982 by-election ====
As largely predicted, Richard Court retained the seat for the Liberal Party, albeit against an estimated swing of 9.1% to the ALP.

Nedlands state by-election, 1982
Party	Candidate	Votes	%	±%
Liberal	Richard Court	5,261	49.48	–18.31
Labor	Ian Temby	3,542	33.31	+6.67
Independent Liberal	Margaret Sheen	1,020	9.59	+9.59
Democrats	Malcolm McKercher	745	7.01	+7.01
Independent	Alf Bussell	48	0.45	+0.45
Independent	James Croasdale	16	0.15	–5.42
Total formal votes		10,632	98.27	+0.72
Informal votes		187	1.73	−0.72
Turnout		10,819	79.76	–8.51
Two-party-preferred result
Liberal	Richard Court		59.8	–9.1
Labor	Ian Temby		40.2	+9.1
Liberal hold		Swing	–9.1	

==== 1980 ====
1980 Western Australian state election: Nedlands
Party	Candidate	Votes	%	±%
Liberal	Charles Court	8,448	67.8	−3.2
Labor	Peter O'Donoghue	3,320	26.6	+3.7
Independent	James Croasdale	694	5.6	+4.6
Total formal votes		12,462	97.5	−0.4
Informal votes		313	2.5	+0.4
Turnout		12,775	88.3	−1.7
Two-party-preferred result
Liberal	Charles Court	8,795	70.6	−3.4
Labor	Peter O'Donoghue	3,667	29.4	+3.4
Liberal hold		Swing	−3.4	

=== Elections in the 1970s ===
==== 1977 ====
1977 Western Australian state election: Nedlands
Party	Candidate	Votes	%	±%
Liberal	Charles Court	9,434	71.0	
Labor	Gordon Black	3,044	22.9	
Australia	John Hallam	549	4.1	
Independent	Graeme Pratt	135	1.0	
Independent	James Croasdale	129	1.0	
Total formal votes		13,291	97.9	
Informal votes		284	2.1	
Turnout		13,575	90.0	
Two-party-preferred result
Liberal	Charles Court	9,841	74.0	
Labor	Gordon Black	3,450	26.0	
Liberal hold		Swing		

==== 1974 ====
1974 Western Australian state election: Nedlands
Party	Candidate	Votes	%	±%
Liberal	Charles Court	9,103	66.8	
Labor	Christopher Thompson	4,516	33.2	
Total formal votes		13,619	97.9	
Informal votes		286	2.1	
Turnout		13,905	88.7	
Liberal hold		Swing		

==== 1971 ====
1971 Western Australian state election: Nedlands
Party	Candidate	Votes	%	±%
Liberal	Charles Court	7,648	66.1	−10.5
Labor	John Crouch	2,532	21.9	−1.5
Democratic Labor	George Mazak	855	7.4	+7.4
Communist	Paul Marsh	275	2.4	+2.4
Independent	Ralph Von Paleske	264	2.3	+2.3
Total formal votes		11,574	97.6	−0.8
Informal votes		280	2.4	+0.8
Turnout		11,854	89.3	−0.4
Two-party-preferred result
Liberal	Charles Court	8,666	74.9	−1.8
Labor	John Crouch	2,908	25.1	+1.8
Liberal hold		Swing	−1.8	

=== Elections in the 1960s ===
==== 1968 ====
1968 Western Australian state election: Nedlands
Party	Candidate	Votes	%	±%
Liberal and Country	Charles Court	8,533	76.6	
Labor	Eric Hicks	2,599	23.4	
Total formal votes		11,132	98.4	
Informal votes		178	1.6	
Turnout		11,310	89.7	
Liberal and Country hold		Swing		

==== 1965 ====
1965 Western Australian state election: Nedlands
Party	Candidate	Votes	%	±%
Liberal and Country	Charles Court	7,790	80.9	+9.5
Labor	Alastair Rae	1,835	19.1	−9.5
Total formal votes		9,625	97.1	−2.1
Informal votes		291	2.9	+2.1
Turnout		9,916	91.6	+1.3
Liberal and Country hold		Swing	+9.5	

==== 1962 ====
1962 Western Australian state election: Nedlands
Party	Candidate	Votes	%	±%
Liberal and Country	Charles Court	7,165	71.4	
Labor	John Henshaw	2,866	28.6	
Total formal votes		10,031	99.2	
Informal votes		76	0.8	
Turnout		10,107	90.3	
Liberal and Country hold		Swing		

=== Elections in the 1950s ===
==== 1959 ====
1959 Western Australian state election: Nedlands
Party	Candidate	Votes	%	±%
Liberal and Country	Charles Court	unopposed		
Liberal and Country hold		Swing		

==== 1956 ====
1956 Western Australian state election: Nedlands
Party	Candidate	Votes	%	±%
Liberal and Country	Charles Court	6,037	72.9	
Independent Liberal	David Grayden	2,249	27.1	
Total formal votes		8,286	96.8	
Informal votes		277	3.2	
Turnout		8,563	91.2	
Liberal and Country hold		Swing		

==== 1953 ====
1953 Western Australian state election: Nedlands
Party	Candidate	Votes	%	±%
Liberal and Country	Charles Court	2,834	32.3	−7.7
Independent Liberal	David Grayden	2,409	27.5	−6.4
Labor	Margaret Pitt Morrison	1,948	22.2	+22.2
Liberal and Country	Peter Aldred	924	10.5	+10.5
Independent	Noel Symington	457	5.2	+5.2
Liberal and Country	Sidney Bedells	205	2.3	+2.3
Total formal votes		8,777	98.0	+0.5
Informal votes		183	2.0	−0.5
Turnout		8,960	93.5	+4.0
Two-candidate-preferred result
Liberal and Country	Charles Court	4,807	54.8	+8.2
Independent Liberal	David Grayden	3,970	45.2	−8.2
Liberal and Country gain from Independent Liberal		Swing	+8.2	

==== 1950 ====
1950 Western Australian state election: Nedlands
Party	Candidate	Votes	%	±%
Liberal and Country	Cyril Bird	3,375	40.0	
Independent Liberal	David Grayden	2,856	33.9	
Liberal and Country	Norbert Keenan	1,962	23.3	
Independent Liberal	John Symonds	241	2.9	
Total formal votes		8,434	97.5	
Informal votes		216	2.5	
Turnout		8,650	89.5	
Two-candidate-preferred result
Independent Liberal	David Grayden	4,500	53.4	
Liberal and Country	Cyril Bird	3,934	46.6	
Independent Liberal gain from Liberal and Country		Swing		

=== Elections in the 1940s ===
==== 1947 ====
1947 Western Australian state election: Nedlands
Party	Candidate	Votes	%	±%
Nationalist	Norbert Keenan	9,210	73.52	+1.43
Independent	W. M. Williams	3,318	26.48	–1.43
Total formal votes		12,528	97.94	+0.58
Informal votes		264	2.06	–0.58
Turnout		12,792	82.59	–1.89

==== 1943 ====
1943 Western Australian state election: Nedlands
Party	Candidate	Votes	%	±%
Nationalist	Norbert Keenan	7,964	72.09	+24.10
Independent	Wilfred Lewis	3,084	27.91	+27.91
Total formal votes		11,048	97.36	–0.81
Informal votes		300	2.64	+0.81
Turnout		11,348	84.48	–8.31

The Independent candidate at the 1947 election was a member of the Labor Party but did not receive the party's endorsement.

=== Elections in the 1930s ===
==== 1939 ====
1939 Western Australian state election: Nedlands
Party	Candidate	Votes	%	±%
Nationalist	Norbert Keenan	5,102	47.99	–11.16
Labor	Dorothy Tangney	3,267	30.73	–10.12
Independent	Albert Crooks	2,262	21.28	+21.28
Total formal votes		10,631	98.39	–1.22
Informal votes		198	1.83	+1.22
Turnout		10,829	92.79	+23.95
Two-party-preferred result
Nationalist	Norbert Keenan	7,025	66.08	+6.93
Labor	Dorothy Tangney	3,606	33.92	–6.93

==== 1936 ====
1936 Western Australian state election: Nedlands
Party	Candidate	Votes	%	±%
Nationalist	Norbert Keenan	3,966	59.15	+4.01
Labor	Dorothy Tangney	2,739	40.85	–4.01
Total formal votes		6,705	99.39	+0.65
Informal votes		41	0.61	–0.65
Turnout		6,746	68.84	–23.02

==== 1933 ====
1933 Western Australian state election: Nedlands
Party	Candidate	Votes	%	±%
Nationalist	Norbert Keenan	4,234	55.14	–0.78
Labor	Frank Darcey	3,445	44.86	+0.78
Total formal votes		7,679	98.74	+0.64
Informal votes		98	1.26	–0.64
Turnout		7,777	91.86	+9.47

==== 1930 ====
1930 Western Australian state election: Nedlands
Party	Candidate	Votes	%	±%
Labor	John Leonard	2,198	36.29	
Nationalist	Norbert Keenan	1,392	22.98	
Nationalist	Cliff Sadlier	1,150	18.99	
Nationalist	Isaac Foristal	741	12.23	
Nationalist	Thomas Molloy	245	4.05	
Nationalist	Adolphus Terelinck	232	3.83	
Independent	John William Attey	99	1.63	
Total formal votes		6,057	98.10	
Informal votes		117	1.90	
Turnout		6,174	82.39	
Two-party-preferred result
Nationalist	Norbert Keenan	3,387	55.92	
Labor	John Leonard	2,670	44.08	
