= Members of the Western Australian Legislative Assembly, 2001–2005 =

This is a list of members of the Western Australian Legislative Assembly from 2001 to 2005:

Name	Party	District	Years in office
Ross Ainsworth	National	Roe	1989–2005
Paul Andrews	Labor	Southern River	2001–2008
Colin Barnett	Liberal	Cottesloe	1990–2018
Matt Birney	Liberal	Kalgoorlie	2001–2008
Mike Board	Liberal	Murdoch	1993–2001
John Bowler	Labor	Eyre	2001–2013
John Bradshaw	Liberal	Murray	1983–2005
Clive Brown	Labor	Bassendean	1993–2005
Alan Carpenter	Labor	Willagee	1996–2009
Liz Constable	Independent	Churchlands	1991–2013
Richard Court^{[2]}	Liberal	Nedlands	1982–2001
Hendy Cowan^{[3]}	National	Merredin	1974–2001
John D'Orazio	Labor	Ballajura	2001–2008
John Day	Liberal	Darling Range	1993–2017
Tony Dean	Labor	Bunbury	2001–2005
Cheryl Edwardes	Liberal	Kingsley	1989–2005
Jamie Edwards	Liberal	Greenough	2001–2005
Judy Edwards	Labor	Maylands	1990–2008
Geoff Gallop	Labor	Victoria Park	1986–2006
Larry Graham	Independent	Pilbara	1989–2005
Brendon Grylls^{[3]}	National	Merredin	2001–2017
Dianne Guise	Labor	Wanneroo	2001–2008
Shane Hill	Labor	Geraldton	2001–2008
Katie Hodson-Thomas	Liberal	Carine	1996–2008
Monty House	National	Stirling	1986–2005
John Hyde	Labor	Perth	2001–2013
Rob Johnson	Liberal	Hillarys	1993–2017
John Kobelke	Labor	Nollamara	1989–2013
Bob Kucera	Labor	Yokine	2001–2008
Fran Logan	Labor	Cockburn	2001–2021
Alannah MacTiernan	Labor	Armadale	1996–2010
Norm Marlborough	Labor	Peel	1986–2006
Arthur Marshall	Liberal	Dawesville	1993–2005
Carol Martin	Labor	Kimberley	2001–2013
Bernie Masters	Liberal/Independent^{[4]}	Vasse	1996–2005
Jim McGinty	Labor	Fremantle	1990–2009
Mark McGowan	Labor	Rockingham	1996–2023
Sheila McHale	Labor	Thornlie	1996–2008
Bill McNee	Liberal	Moore	1983–1986; 1989–2005
Tony McRae	Labor	Riverton	2001–2008
Mick Murray	Labor	Collie	2001–2021
Tony O'Gorman	Labor	Joondalup	2001–2013
Paul Omodei	Liberal	Warren-Blackwood	1989–2008
Phillip Pendal	Independent	South Perth	1993–2005
John Quigley	Labor	Innaloo	2001–2025
Margaret Quirk	Labor	Girrawheen	2001–2025
Jaye Radisich	Labor	Swan Hills	2001–2008
Fred Riebeling	Labor	Burrup	1992–2008
Eric Ripper	Labor	Belmont	1988–2013
Michelle Roberts	Labor	Midland	1994–2025
Dan Sullivan	Liberal	Mitchell	1996–2008
Rod Sweetman	Liberal	Ningaloo	1996–2005
David Templeman	Labor	Mandurah	2001–2025
Max Trenorden	National	Avon	1986–2008
Terry Waldron	National	Wagin	2001–2017
Sue Walker^{[2]}	Liberal	Nedlands	2001–2008
Peter Watson	Labor	Albany	2001–2021
Martin Whitely	Labor	Roleystone	2001–2013
Janet Woollard	Independent^{[1]}	Alfred Cove	2001–2013

== Notes ==
^{1} Janet Woollard was elected at the 2001 election as an Independent, but also represented the unregistered party Liberals for Forests which had been founded by her husband, former Australian Medical Association president, Dr Keith Woollard, the previous year.
^{2} On 23 February 2001, the Liberal member for Nedlands and former premier, Richard Court, resigned. Liberal candidate Sue Walker won the resulting by-election on 9 June 2001.
^{3} On 12 October 2001, the Nationals' leader, member for Merredin and former deputy premier, Hendy Cowan, resigned to run for the Australian Senate. Nationals candidate Brendon Grylls won the resulting by-election on 24 November 2001.
^{4} On 16 February 2004, the Liberal member for Vasse, Bernie Masters, left the party to serve as an Independent after failing to be preselected for his seat ahead of the 2005 state election.

== Sources ==
- "Former Members" (PDF). Parliament of Western Australia. 2011. Archived from the original (PDF) on 7 August 2011.
