= 2001 Nedlands state by-election =

A by-election for the seat of Nedlands in the Legislative Assembly of Western Australia was held on 9 June 2001. It was triggered by the resignation of Richard Court, the sitting Liberal member and a former premier, on 27 April 2001. The Liberal candidate at the by-election, Sue Walker, retained the seat with 53.4 percent of the two-candidate-preferred (2CP) vote, a negative swing of 1.5 points from the 2001 state election. The Greens made the final 2CP count for only the second time in their history (the first being at the 1990 Cottesloe by-election).

== Background ==
Richard Court had held Nedlands for the Liberal Party since winning a 1982 by-election. He replaced his father, Sir Charles Court, and also emulated his father in becoming leader of the Liberal Party (in 1992) and premier (after the 1993 state election). Court's government was defeated at the 2001 state election, and he resigned as leader of the Liberal Party a few weeks later. He resigned from parliament altogether on 27 April 2001, with the writ for the by-election issued on 10 May and the close of nominations on 18 May. Polling day was on 9 June, with the writ returned on 13 June.

== Results ==
Nedlands state by-election, 2001
Party	Candidate	Votes	%	±%
Liberal	Sue Walker	6,887	43.5	–5.7
Labor	Simon Corrigan	2,912	18.4	–0.7
Greens	Steve Walker	2,214	14.0	+7.3
Liberals for Forests	Robin Collin	1,928	12.2	–6.1
Democrats	Ashley Buckle	960	6.1	+2.8
One Nation	Bill Edgar	583	3.7	+1.0
Independent	Karen McDonald	254	1.6	+1.6
Independent	Frank Ash	93	0.6	+0.6
Total formal votes		15,831	97.7	+0.3
Informal votes		372	2.3	–0.3
Turnout		16,203	68.3	–19.8
Two-candidate-preferred result
Liberal	Sue Walker	8,439	53.4	–1.5
Greens	Steve Walker	7,362	46.6	+46.6
Liberal hold		Swing	–1.5	

== Aftermath ==
Walker held Nedlands until her defeat at the 2008 state election. She sat as an independent for the last months of her term.

== See also ==
- Electoral results for the district of Nedlands
- List of Western Australian state by-elections
- Women in the Western Australian Legislative Assembly
