= 1982 Nedlands state by-election =

Western Australian Legislative Assembly by-election

The 1982 Nedlands state by-election was a by-election held on 13 March 1982 for the Western Australian Legislative Assembly seat of Nedlands in the western suburbs of Perth.

The by-election was triggered by the resignation of the Liberal member for the seat, Premier Sir Charles Court, on 25 January 1982. Court had held the seat since the 1953 state election. Having served as a senior minister in the Brand–Watts Ministry and then as Premier since the 1974 state election, his retirement had been widely expected and was announced on 18 December, a few months after his 70th birthday. He claimed that he had delayed his retirement to carry through the battle against the federal government over funding for Western Australia.

On 2 February 1982, the Speaker of the Western Australian Legislative Assembly issued a writ for an election in the district. It was to be held concurrently with a by-election in the Labor-held seat of Swan and a legislative council by-election for South Metropolitan. His son, 33-year-old businessman Richard Court, was preselected for the Liberal Party to run for the seat.

The seat of Nedlands, first established in 1929, was considered to be a safe seat for the Liberal Party, and had had just two other members since its creation—former Attorney-General and leader of the Nationalist Party, Norbert Keenan, and the independent Liberal member David Grayden, who served for a single term from 1950 until his defeat in 1953 by Court.

== Timeline ==
Date	Event
18 December 1981	Sir Charles Court announced that he would resign as Premier and as a member of Parliament.
25 January 1982	Court's resignation took effect; Ray O'Connor became premier, and the seat of Nedlands became vacant.
2 February 1982	Writs were issued by the Speaker of the Legislative Assembly to proceed with a by-election.
17 February 1982	Close of nominations and draw of ballot papers.
13 March 1982	Polling day, between the hours of 8am and 6pm.
22 March 1982	The writ was returned and the results formally declared.

== Candidates ==
The by-election attracted six candidates. Local businesswoman and long-standing Liberal Party member Margaret Sheen nominated as an Independent Liberal, while the Labor Party nominated lawyer Ian Temby QC, who had been prominent in assisting the Labor Party with court challenges to the government's electoral legislation. Temby accused local real estate agents of discriminating against him with a view to preventing him from obtaining a campaign office. The Australian Democrats, perennial independent candidate Alf Bussell and another independent who had also stood at the 1977 and 1980 elections also nominated.

== Results ==
As largely predicted, Richard Court retained the seat for the Liberal Party, albeit against an estimated swing of 9.1% to the ALP.

Nedlands state by-election, 1982
Party	Candidate	Votes	%	±%
Liberal	Richard Court	5,261	49.48	–18.31
Labor	Ian Temby	3,542	33.31	+6.67
Independent Liberal	Margaret Sheen	1,020	9.59	+9.59
Democrats	Malcolm McKercher	745	7.01	+7.01
Independent	Alf Bussell	48	0.45	+0.45
Independent	James Croasdale	16	0.15	–5.42
Total formal votes		10,632	98.27	+0.72
Informal votes		187	1.73	−0.72
Turnout		10,819	79.76	–8.51
Two-party-preferred result
Liberal	Richard Court		59.8	–9.1
Labor	Ian Temby		40.2	+9.1
Liberal hold		Swing	–9.1	
