= Katrina Stratton =

Western Australian politician

The Honourable Katrina Stratton MLC
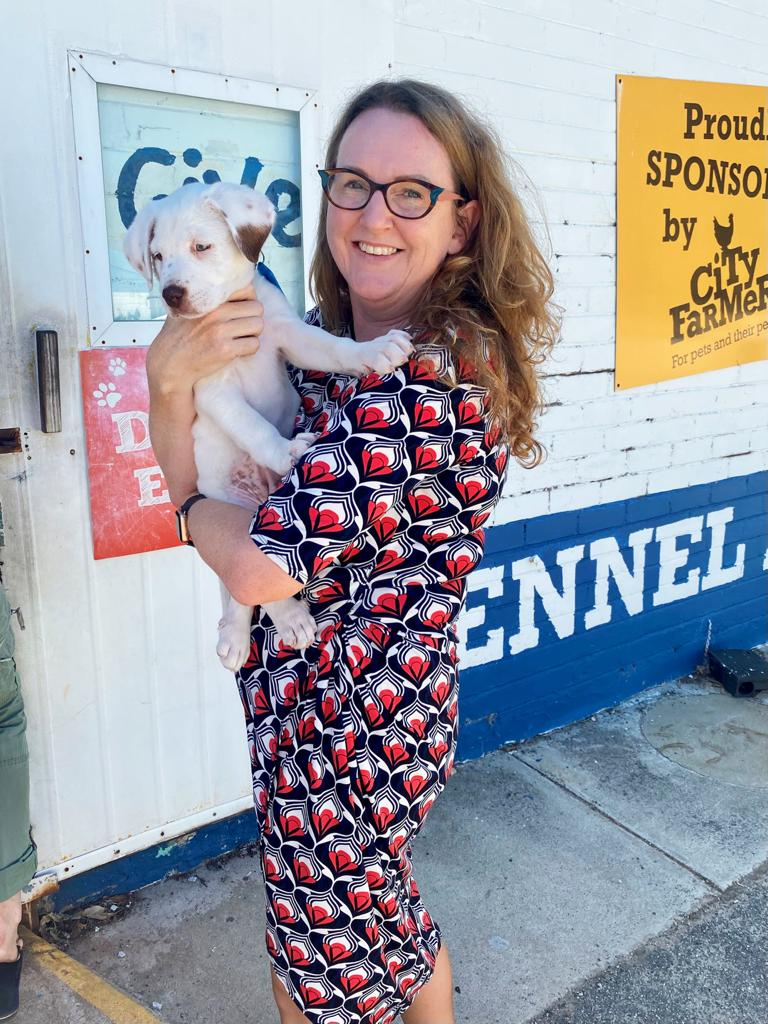
- Katrina Stratton holds a dog at the Dogs' Refuge Home in Shenton Park

Member of the Western Australian Legislative Council
- Incumbent
- Assumed office 22 May 2025

Member of the Western Australian Legislative Assembly for Nedlands
- In office 13 March 2021 – 5 February 2025
- Preceded by: Bill Marmion
- Succeeded by: Jonathan Huston

Personal details
- Born: 6 January 1973 (age 53) Subiaco, Western Australia
- Party: Labor
- Education: University of Western Australia BSW (Hons); MBA; PhD.
- Profession: Educator; Social Work Researcher
- Website: katrinastratton.com.au

Katrina Stratton (born 6 January 1973) is an Australian Labor politician who has served as a member of the Western Australian Legislative Council since May 2025. She previously served as a member of the Western Australian Legislative Assembly from 2021 to 2025 representing Nedlands. Since 27 May 2025, Stratton has also served as the Parliamentary Secretary to the Minister for Planning and Lands, Housing and Works and Health Infrastructure in the Second Cook Ministry.

== Education and career ==
Stratton has a number of degrees, having obtained a Bachelor of Social Work, a Doctor of Philosophy, and a Master in Business Administration from the University of Western Australia. Prior to her election win in 2021 Stratton lectured at Curtin University and was a board member at Tuart Place, a resource service for adults who were in out-of-home care during their childhood.

== Election results ==
=== 2021 State Election ===
Stratton was preselected as the Labor candidate in Nedlands for the 2021 election. Nedlands had been held by the Liberals or their predecessors since its creation in 1930, most notably by former premiers Charles and Richard Court. For much of that time, Labor usually ran dead in the seat. As a measure of how strongly the seat tilted toward the Liberals, in 2001 Labor was pushed into third place even as the Liberals suffered the second-largest defeat of a sitting government in the state's history at the time. The incumbent member, former minister and former deputy opposition leader Bill Marmion, sat on a margin of eight percent after a redistribution before the writs were issued. However, Stratton narrowly led Marmion on the first count after Marmion lost over 16 percent of his primary vote from 2017. Stratton ultimately won the seat with 52.8% of the two-party preferred vote, a swing of 10.8%, after preferences were distributed. She defeated Marmion on the fifth count after over three-quarters of Green preferences flowed to her. Her victory was part of a large swing toward Labor in the western suburbs of Perth, an area long considered Liberal heartland.

Western Australian Legislative Assembly
Preceded by Bill Marmion	Member for Nedlands; 2021–2025	Succeeded by Jonathan Huston
