= Bill Grayden =

Australian politician (1920–2026)

The Honourable Bill Grayden AM
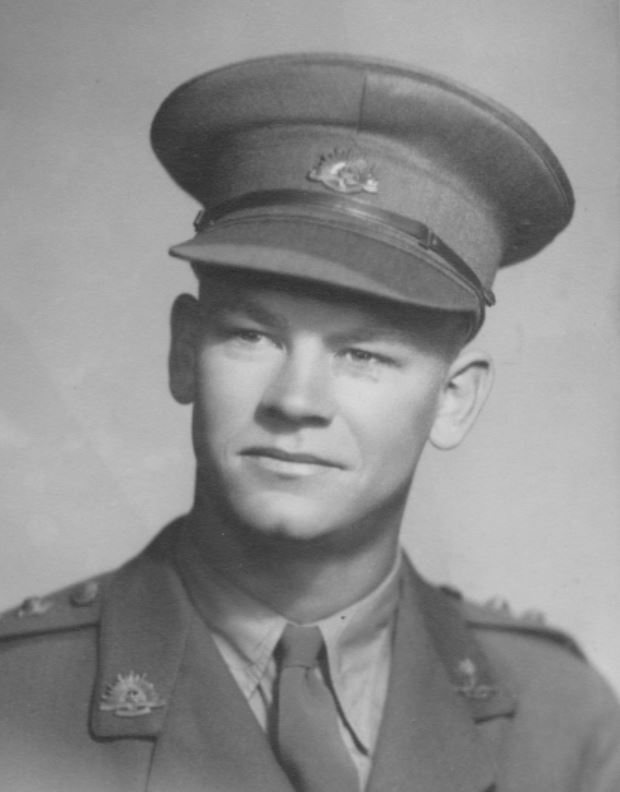
- Grayden in 1940

Member of the Western Australian Legislative Assembly
- In office 7 April 1956 – 6 February 1993
- Preceded by: George Yates
- Succeeded by: Phillip Pendal
- Constituency: South Perth
- In office 15 March 1947 – 27 October 1949
- Preceded by: James Hegney
- Succeeded by: James Hegney
- Constituency: Middle Swan

Member of the Australian House of Representatives for Swan
- In office 10 December 1949 – 29 May 1954
- Preceded by: Len Hamilton
- Succeeded by: Harry Webb

Personal details
- Born: Wilbur Ives; 5 August 1920 Bickley, Western Australia, Australia
- Died: 28 April 2026 (aged 105)
- Party: Liberal
- Other political affiliations: Independent (1946); Independent Liberal (1949)
- Spouse: Betsy Marie Chadwick (m. 1948; died 2007)
- Children: 10
- Relatives: David Grayden (brother); Nat Harper (grandfather)
- Profession: Mechanical engineer
- Military career
- Allegiance: Australia
- Branch: Second Australian Imperial Force
- Service years: 1940–1946
- Rank: Captain
- Service number: WX8868
- Unit: 2/16th Battalion
- Conflicts: Second World War; Syria–Lebanon Campaign; Kokoda Track campaign; Finisterre Range campaign; Battle of Balikpapan
- Awards: Member of the Order of Australia

William Leonard Grayden (born Wilbur Ives; 5 August 1920 – 28 April 2026) was an Australian politician. He was a member of parliament across six decades, serving in the Western Australian Legislative Assembly (1947–1949, 1956–1993) and the Australian House of Representatives (1949–1954). A veteran of the Second World War, he served as a Liberal with the exception of a brief period as an independent. Grayden was a backbencher in federal parliament, but later held ministerial office in the state government of Charles Court (1974–1978, 1980–1982). His brother David and grandfather Nat Harper were also members of parliament.

== Early life and military service ==
Grayden was born Wilbur Ives on 5 August 1920 in Bickley, Western Australia. He was one of three children born to Ethel May Harper and Aubrey Leonard Ives, including his younger brother David who also entered politics. Grayden's father participated in the landing at Anzac Cove on 25 April 1915, and lost a lung after being shot by a Turkish sniper. The marriage broke up and his mother gave the children their step-father's surname after she remarried. Grayden was the maternal grandson of Western Australian businessman and politician Nat Harper.

Grayden was educated at state schools and then at Perth Technical College, as part of an apprenticeship commenced in 1938 as a motor mechanic with Winterbottom Motors. He attempted to enlist in the Second Australian Imperial Force when the Second World War broke out in September 1939, but was rejected. He succeeded the following year after lying about his age. Grayden joined the 2/16th Infantry Battalion as a private, but was soon promoted to corporal and then selected to attend Officer Training School in Bonegilla. He served on the Syrian campaign and then in 1942 was sent to New Guinea, where he took part in the Kokoda Track campaign, the Battle of Buna–Gona, and the Markham and Ramu Valley campaign. He ended the war in Borneo and took part in the Battle of Balikpapan.

== Politics ==
Grayden served a total of 43 years in State and Federal Parliament.

=== State and federal politics: 1946–1954 ===
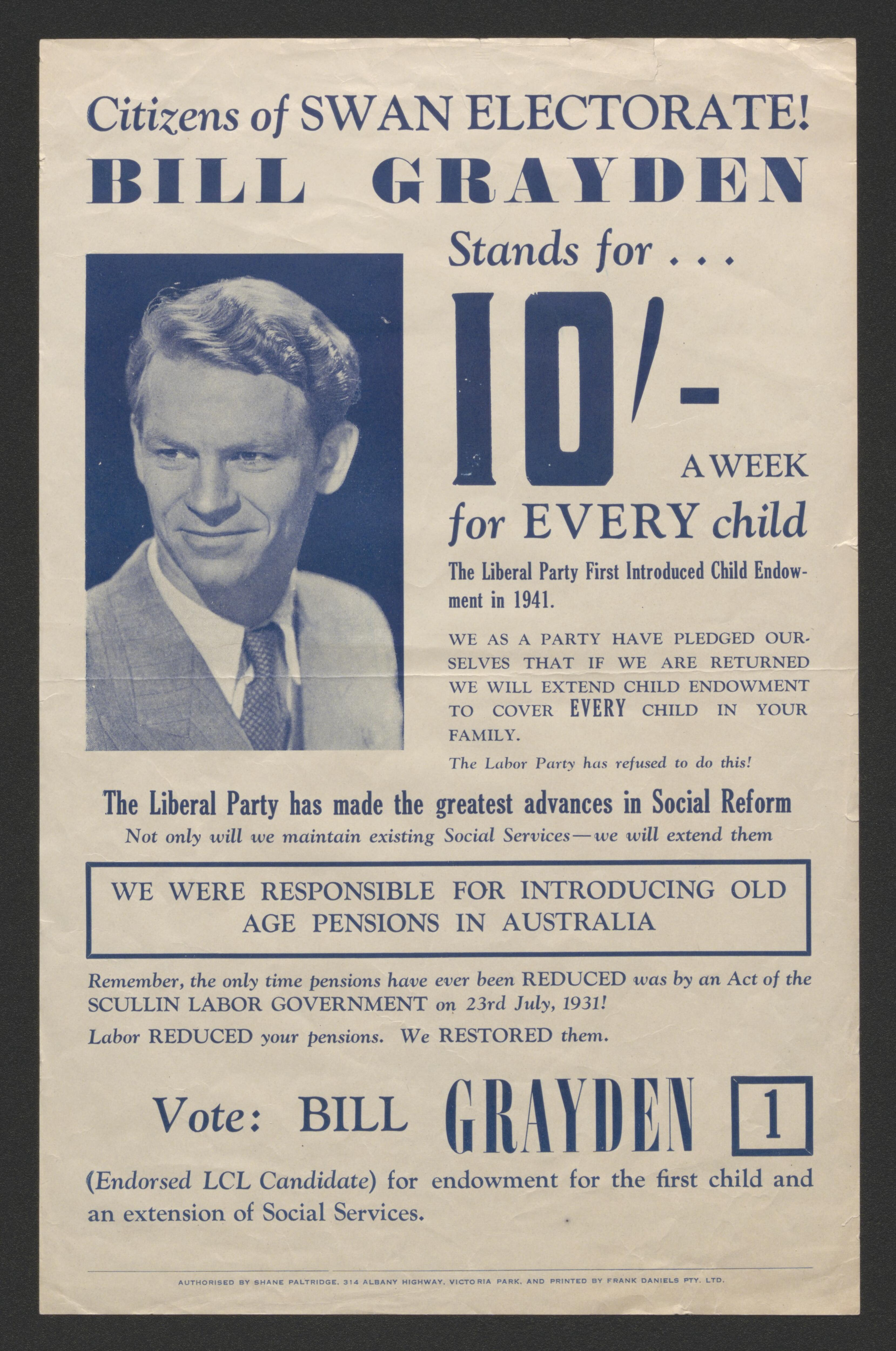
Campaign material used by Grayden at the 1949 federal election

Grayden stood as an independent in the Division of Swan at the 1946 federal election. At the 1947 Western Australian state election, he was elected to the Legislative Assembly as the Liberal member for Middle Swan. He was the youngest member of the parliament.

At the 1949 federal election, Grayden transferred to the Australian House of Representatives, winning the seat of Swan for the Liberals. He stated his primary interest in parliament would be defence. He was re-elected at the 1951 election but defeated by Australian Labor Party (ALP) candidate Harry Webb at the 1954 election.

He initiated a number of publicity stunts during his time in parliament. In October 1950 he sent whale meat from a station at Carnarvon to Canberra to be served on the parliamentary menu. In December 1950 he announced "Operation Corks", a plan to test the impact of pollution from Fremantle Harbour by dropping hundreds of coloured corks into the Swan River. In 1953 Grayden led an expedition to Central Australia seeking evidence of the lost Leichhardt expedition. The 1953 group visited the area around the Rawlinson Ranges and returned with various indigenous and non-indigenous artefacts, but none were linked to Leichhardt.

=== State politics: 1956–1993 ===
In 1956, Grayden returned to the Legislative Assembly, winning the seat of South Perth. He stood as an unendorsed Liberal against the endorsed Liberal and Country League (LCL) candidate, and was re-elected as an "independent Liberal" at the 1959 election, again defeating an endorsed candidate. He subsequently was admitted as an LCL member.

Grayden had a strong interest in indigenous affairs. In 1956, he told parliament that the British nuclear tests at Maralinga "could mean death from sickness or starvation to 800 tribal aborigines", and that it would be difficult to warn them due to their nomadic nature. In the same year he led a parliamentary enquiry into the state of remote indigenous peoples. The resulting report by the select committee was tabled in December 1956, officially called the Report of the Select Committee appointed to Enquire into Native Welfare Conditions in the Laverton-Warburton Range Area, also known as the Grayden Report. It brought to public consciousness the dreadful plight of many of the nomadic Wongi peoples, and after newspaper publicity the affair developed into what became known as the Warburton Ranges controversy, leading to much public discussion, lobbying of both federal and state governments, and Indigenous activism. The latter contributed to a national movement campaigning for the rights of Indigenous Australians, including the formation of what is now known as Federal Council for the Advancement of Aborigines and Torres Strait Islanders (FCAATSI).

In February 1957, disappointed by the public reaction to the report, Grayden, fellow MLA Stan Lapham and Aboriginal pastor Douglas Nicholls returned to Ngaanyatjarra with a film camera to document the conditions. The resulting film Their Darkest Hour (also titled Manslaughter), shown at public meetings around Australia, was said to have "variously shocked and enraged audiences" and has been called "one of the earliest examples of activist documentary in Australia". Grayden also released a book of black and white photographs titled Adam and Atoms.

In 1974, Grayden was appointed Minister for Labour and Industry, Consumer Affairs, Immigration and Tourism in the government of Charles Court. In 1976 he introduced legislation that would abolish compulsory trade union membership. Grayden resigned from the ministry in 1978 following "an early-morning fracas involving two policemen in a Perth hotel", as a result of which he was convicted of assault and wilful damage. He returned to the ministry after the 1980 state election as Minister for Education, Cultural Affairs, and Recreation. Grayden was removed from the ministry in 1982 following Court's retirement and replacement by Ray O'Connor. The Canberra Times described him at the time as "the WA Parliament's stormy petrel" and noted that he expected to spend another 10 or 12 years in politics.

He left the Assembly in 1993.

== Personal life and death ==
Grayden married Betsy Marie Chadwick on 31 July 1948, with whom he had five sons and five daughters. At the time of his death, he had 36 grandchildren and 50 great-grandchildren. His son Jim stood as a candidate at the 2018 Perth by-election (as an independent Liberal) and the 2019 federal election (as an endorsed Liberal candidate).

In 2015, aged 94, Grayden visited Gallipoli to commemorate the 100th anniversary of the landing at Anzac Cove, in which his father had participated.

Grayden turned 100 in 2020 and was the last surviving MP elected in 1949, as well as the last surviving MP first elected before 1961, and the last Liberal MP who served under Robert Menzies. In a 2019 interview he recalled his personal memories of Menzies, Ben Chifley, and Billy Hughes. He died on 28 April 2026, at the age of 105, after a short illness. A state funeral was held at St George's Cathedral, Perth, five weeks later.

== See also ==
- List of centenarians (politicians and civil servants)

Parliament of Australia
Preceded by Len Hamilton	Member for Swan; 1949–1954	Succeeded by Harry Webb
Western Australian Legislative Assembly
Preceded by James Hegney	Member for Middle Swan; 1947–1949	Succeeded by James Hegney
Preceded by George Yates	Member for South Perth; 1956–1993	Succeeded by Phillip Pendal
Honorary titles
Preceded by Clyde Cameron	Earliest serving living Parliamentarian; 2008–2026	Succeeded by Doug McClelland
Preceded by Clyde Cameron	Earliest serving living MP; 2008–2026	Succeeded by Ian Sinclair
