= Bill Marmion =

Australian politician

The Honourable Bill Marmion

Deputy Leader of the Opposition in Western Australia
- In office 13 June 2019 – 22 November 2020
- Leader: Liza Harvey
- Preceded by: Liza Harvey
- Succeeded by: Libby Mettam

Deputy Leader of the Liberal Party of Western Australia
- In office 13 June 2019 – 22 November 2020
- Leader: Liza Harvey
- Preceded by: Liza Harvey
- Succeeded by: Libby Mettam

Member of the Western Australian Legislative Assembly for Nedlands
- In office 6 September 2008 – 13 March 2021
- Preceded by: Sue Walker
- Succeeded by: Katrina Stratton

Personal details
- Born: William Richard Marmion; 22 May 1954 (age 72) Kalgoorlie, Western Australia
- Party: Liberal
- Education: University of Western Australia

William Richard Marmion (born 22 May 1954) is an Australian politician who was a member of the Legislative Assembly of Western Australia between 2008 and 2021, representing the seat of Nedlands. He served as a minister in the government of Colin Barnett from 2010 to 2017. He later served as deputy leader of the Liberal Party of Australia (Western Australian Division) from 2019 to 2020.

== Early life ==
Marmion was born in Kalgoorlie, Western Australia, to Betty Ellen (née Ramm) and Richard Stephen Marmion. His great-grandfather, William Edward Marmion, was a member of parliament in the 19th century. His father was a mechanical engineer, and the family lived for periods in Kalgoorlie and Wittenoom before eventually settling in Bunbury. Marmion attended Bunbury Senior High School and then boarded at Hale School, Perth, for his final two years of high school. He went on to study at the University of Western Australia, initially graduating with a Bachelor of Engineering (B.Eng.) degree and later returning to complete a Master of Business Administration (M.B.A.) degree. Before entering politics, Marmion worked as a civil engineer for Main Roads Western Australia, as a VFM auditor for the state government's auditor-general, and for his own strategic planning business. He was also president of the state branch of Engineers Australia for three years.

== Politics ==
From 1992 to 1997, Marmion was the private secretary to Peter Foss, a state Liberal MP and a minister in the government of Richard Court. In 1997, he transferred to Court's office, where he remained until the government's defeat at the 2001 state election. Marmion entered parliament himself at the 2008 state election, winning the seat of Nedlands from Sue Walker, an independent who had resigned from the Liberal Party earlier in the year. He was made parliamentary secretary to the Minister for Transport (Simon O'Brien) shortly after the election, and later served in a similar position for the premier. In April 2010, following the resignation of Troy Buswell, Marmion was elevated to the ministry as Minister for Commerce, Minister for Housing, and Minister for Science and Innovation. In a reshuffle in December 2010, he was instead made Minister for the Environment and Minister for Water. Another reshuffle occurred after the 2013 state election, with Marmion becoming Minister for Mines and Petroleum and Minister for Housing (for a second time). He was also made Minister for Finance in December 2014, and Minister for State Development in March 2016, but lost the mines portfolio to Sean L'Estrange. In September 2016, he was shifted from finance to transport to replace resigned minister Dean Nalder.

In 2017, Marmion suffered a swing of almost 11 percent, and was left as one of only nine Liberals from Perth. Four years later, Marmion was swept out amid the Liberals' meltdown in the capital. He lost over 16 percent of his primary vote from 2017, and narrowly trailed Labor challenger Katrina Stratton on the first count. Ultimately, Stratton defeated Marmion on the fifth count after Green preferences flowed overwhelmingly to her.

== See also ==
- Barnett Ministry

Parliament of Western Australia
Preceded by Sue Walker	Member for Nedlands; 2008–2021	Succeeded by Katrina Stratton
Political offices
Preceded by Troy Buswell	Minister for Commerce; 2010	Succeeded by Simon O'Brien
Preceded by Troy Buswell	Minister for Science and Innovation; 2010	Succeeded by John Day
Preceded by Troy Buswell; Terry Redman	Minister for Housing; 2010; 2013–2014	Succeeded by Troy Buswell; Colin Holt
Preceded by John Day	Minister for the Environment; 2010–2013	Succeeded by Albert Jacob
Preceded by Graham Jacobs	Minister for Water; 2010–2013	Succeeded by Terry Redman
Preceded by Norman Moore	Minister for Mines and Petroleum; 2013–2016	Succeeded by Sean L'Estrange
Preceded by Mike Nahan	Minister for Finance; 2014–2016	Succeeded by Sean L'Estrange
Preceded by Colin Barnett	Minister for State Development; 2016–2017	Succeeded by Mark McGowan
New creation	Minister for Innovation; 2016–2017	Succeeded by Dave Kelly
Preceded by Mike Nahan	Minister for Transport; 2016–2017	Succeeded by Rita Saffioti
