= Ian Temby =

Australian commissioner

Ian Temby AO, KC

1st Commonwealth Director of Public Prosecutions
- In office 8 March 1984 – 1988
- Succeeded by: Mark Weinberg

1st Commissioner of the NSW Independent Commission Against Corruption
- In office 13 March 1989 – 12 March 1994
- Succeeded by: Barry O'Keefe

Personal details
- Born: Ian Douglas Temby; 5 May 1942 (age 83) Perth, Western Australia
- Education: Perth Modern School
- Alma mater: University of Western Australia
- Profession: Barrister

Ian Douglas Temby AO, KC (born 5 May 1942) is an Australian barrister. He was the first Commonwealth Director of Public Prosecutions and the first Commissioner of the New South Wales Independent Commission Against Corruption. He conducted the Royal Commission into the Finance Broking Industry in Western Australia in 2001.

== Early life and education ==
Temby was educated at the Perth Modern School and the University of Western Australia, where he earned an LL.B. (Hons.), graduating in 1964.

== Career ==
Temby was admitted to legal practice on 23 December 1966 and joined the Perth law firm Northmore Hale Davey and Leake in the same year. He was called to the Bar in Perth in 1978 and was appointed Queen's Counsel on 16 July 1980. He was the President of the Law Society of Western Australia in 1982–1983 and the President of the Law Council of Australia in 1983–1984.

Temby served on the Subiaco City Council, including as deputy mayor from 1982 to 1983. He was the Australian Labor Party (ALP) candidate at the 1982 Nedlands state by-election, standing against future premier Richard Court.

He served as the inaugural Commonwealth Director of Public Prosecutions from 1984 to 1989, and as the inaugural Commissioner of the New South Wales Independent Commission Against Corruption from 1989 to 1994.

Temby has been in private practice in Sydney since 1 May 1994. He is the Founding Head of Chambers at 3 St James' Hall Chambers.

In his early days in private practice after the end of his tenure as ICAC Commissioner, Temby was appointed to represent Police Commissioner Tony Lauer at the Wood Royal Commission which looked into police corruption.

However this appointment was vetoed by Premier John Fahey due to concerns of a conflict of interest as Temby as ICAC Commissioner had the police under his investigation.

In 2004, he was appointed an Officer of the Order of Australia for service to the law, particularly in developing the role of the independent prosecutor in the Australian criminal justice system.

In 2008, he became a member of the Council of the New South Wales Bar Association. In 2009, he was the Treasurer of the Association.

In 2015, he acted for Archbishop Philip Wilson in relation to a charge of covering up child sexual abuse. In 2017, he appeared in three cases for the New South Wales Crime Commission.

Legal offices
New title	Commonwealth Director of Public Prosecutions; 1984–1988	Succeeded by Mark Weinberg
New title	Commissioner of the New South Wales Independent Commission Against Corruption; 1989–1994	Succeeded by Barry O'Keefe
