= Barry O'Keefe =

Australian judge

The Honourable Barry O'Keefe AM QC

Justice of the Supreme Court of New South Wales
- In office 1993–2004

Commissioner of the NSW Independent Commission Against Corruption
- In office 14 November 1994 – 13 November 1999
- Preceded by: Ian Temby
- Succeeded by: Irene Moss

Personal details
- Born: Barry Stanley John O’Keefe; 20 May 1933 Waverley, New South Wales, Australia
- Died: 24 April 2014 (aged 80) Sydney, New South Wales, Australia
- Spouse: Jan Markovina
- Relations: Johnny O'Keefe (brother)
- Children: 5 including Andrew O'Keefe
- Education: University of Sydney
- Profession: Jurist

Barry Stanley John O’Keefe AM QC, (20 May 1933 – 24 April 2014) was an Australian judge and lawyer who served as a justice of the Supreme Court of New South Wales from 1993 to 2004 and the Commissioner of the Independent Commission Against Corruption (ICAC) from 1994 until 1999.

He also served as the mayor of Mosman. An influential member of Australia's Roman Catholic community, O'Keefe was appointed to the Truth, Justice and Healing Council in 2012, where he organized the Australian Catholic Bishops Conference's response to the findings of the Royal Commission into Institutional Responses to Child Sexual Abuse. He remained the Chairman of the Truth, Justice and Healing Council until his death in 2014.

== Biography ==
O'Keefe's father was Ray O'Keefe, a former Mayor of Waverley Municipal Council, and a furniture salesperson. Barry O'Keefe was the brother of the late rock singer, Johnny O'Keefe, who died in 1978. Their parents sent both brothers to Waverley College, a private Roman Catholic school. Both Barry and John then earned Commonwealth scholarships to the University of Sydney, where Barry O'Keefe studied law. O'Keefe was admitted to the New South Wales Bar Association in 1958 and appointed to Queen's Counsel in 1974.

In 1977, O'Keefe was elected to the Mosman Municipal Council, a position he held for thirteen years, including three terms as the Mayor of Mosman.

He was appointed a judge of the Supreme Court of New South Wales in 1993, where he headed its Commercial law Division, and was an additional judge of the Court of Appeal, and as a judge of the Common Law Division and the NSW Court of Criminal Appeal.

In 1989, O'Keefe received the Order of Australia. He was also inducted as a Freedom of the City of London in 1991 and was awarded the Centenary Medal in 2003. A former president of the Local Government Association of NSW and President of the National Trust of Australia in NSW from 1991 until 2006, O’Keefe was also an energetic member of the Sydney Harbour Federation Trust. He was awarded an honorary doctorate by the Australian Catholic University. Two days before O’Keefe's death, Pope Francis created him a Knight Grand Cross (First Class) of the Order of St Gregory the Great.

O'Keefe died on 24 April 2014, at the age of 80. He was survived by his wife, and their five children including former television host Andrew O'Keefe.

Civic offices
| Preceded by Peter Mellish | Mayor of Mosman; 1978–1983 | Succeeded by Peter Abelson |
| Preceded by Peter Abelson | Mayor of Mosman; 1985–1986 | Succeeded by Dominic Lopez |
| Preceded by Dominic Lopez | Mayor of Mosman; 1987–1990 | Succeeded by Peter Clive |
Legal offices
| Preceded by Ian Temby | Commissioner of the Independent Commission; Against Corruption; 1994–1999 | Succeeded by Irene Moss |
