= 240 St Georges Terrace =

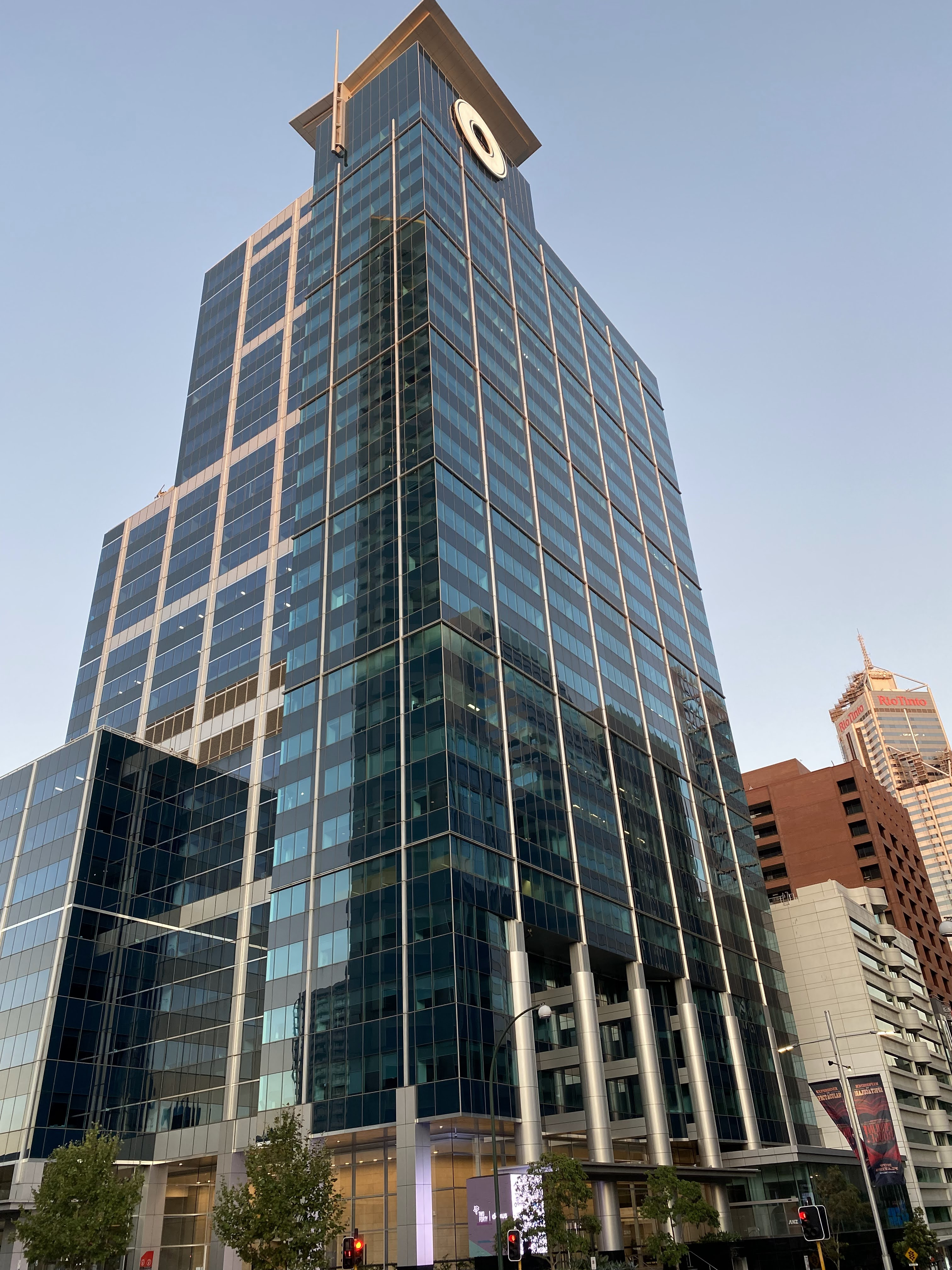
- Interactive map of the 240 St Georges Terrace area
- Former names: Woodside Plaza

General information
- Type: Office tower
- Location: 240 St Georges Terrace, Perth, Western Australia
- Coordinates: 31°57′10″S 115°51′7″E
- Construction started: 27 February 2001
- Completed: 2004
- Opening: March 2004
- Cost: A$250M
- Owner: Dexus
- Management: CBRE

Height
- Antenna spire: 137 m (449 ft)
- Roof: 127 m (417 ft)

Technical details
- Floor count: 27 over ground (including plant); 2 basement
- Floor area: 46,000 m^{2} (500,000 sq ft) (lettable); 77,000 m^{2} (830,000 sq ft) (total)

Design and construction
- Architects: Kann Finch & Partners
- Developer: Deutsche Asset Management
- Structural engineer: Kellogg Brown & Root
- Main contractor: Baulderstone Hornibrook

240 St Georges Terrace, formerly Woodside Plaza, is a 29-storey skyscraper in Perth, Western Australia. The 137-metre (449 ft) tower once served as the headquarters for Woodside Petroleum and incorporates several energy-efficient design features. When completed in 2004, the building was the first premium-grade skyscraper completed in Perth since Central Park in 1992. It is currently the eighth tallest skyscraper in Perth.

== Planning and construction ==
Woodside Petroleum experienced strong growth in its business during the 1990s. However, there had been no major expansion in office space in the Perth central business district since the opening of Exchange Plaza and Central Park in 1992. As a result, by 1998 Woodside had its Perth staff spread across six sites, including Central Park and the headquarters at 1 Adelaide Terrace.

Woodside Petroleum called for tenders for a tower to be constructed for the company. Perron Group put forward a proposal to leave Woodside in its existing headquarters on Adelaide Terrace and build a tower beside it to house the other staff. Meanwhile, Consolidated Press Holdings and Multiplex proposed to build a tower on CPH's Westralia Square site. Jones Lang Wootton proposed a new tower on the Bishop's See site.

However, it was announced in April 1999 that the winning tenderer was Hai Sun Hup Group subsidiary Knoxville Group. This proposal was to develop Hai Sun Hup's site at the corner of St Georges Terrace and Milligan Street into an office tower and hotel project. This 9,000-square-metre (97,000 sq ft) site stretches all the way from St Georges Terrace to Hay Street, and had been bought by Alistair McAlpine for $100 million, before later being sold to Hai Sun Hup in 1996 for just $20 million. The mostly vacant site was occupied by small buildings fronting Hay Street and vacant land fronting all three streets. The corner of Milligan Street and St Georges Terrace also featured the eight-storey AWA Computer House. The development also necessitated the demolition of the building on Hay Street which housed the Matsuri Japanese Restaurant, which moved to new premises in QV1.

Approval of the office tower was delayed due to a dispute with the Department of Transport about the number of car parking bays which could be included in the development, and it was rumoured that the building may not proceed due to difficulties in Hai Sun Hup securing financing. However, the construction was made viable by the booming resources industry in Western Australia.

Planning approval was received from the City of Perth in December 2000, with plot ratio concessions awarded to the development in return for allowing pedestrian thoroughfare and providing a public square at the base of the tower similar to that at the base of the Central Park tower. The $250 million development contract was signed on 30 January 2001. Under this deal, Deutsche Asset Management paid Hai Sun Hup $23 million for the building site and development contract, and Woodside agreed to lease 32,500 square metres (350,000 sq ft) of the tower for 15 years, with two five-year options to extend. Hai Sun Hup retained ownership of the Hay Street side of the site.

Site works began on 31 January 2001, with a groundbreaking ceremony held on 27 February 2001. Construction on the tower by builder Baulderstone Hornibrook began in March 2001.

Although the building would add 46,000 square metres (500,000 sq ft) of office space to the central business district and raise the premium-grade office floor space in the central business district by 24 per cent, Woodside was to occupy so much of it that only 13,500 square metres (145,000 sq ft) would be available to other tenants. By October 2003, building manager CB Richard Ellis had leased all but three floors of the building, after securing law firm Corrs Chambers Westgarth and the joint venture alliance between Transfield, Worley Limited and Woodside. This was reduced to less than two floors unleased in April 2004 when accounting firm Deloitte Touche Tohmatsu signed on as tenant, vacating its office in Central Park.

The building was effectively completed in early 2004, and was officially opened in March 2004. It became Perth's third largest building by total floor area, and was the city's first new high-rise office building in eight years and the first premium-grade tower since the completion of Central Park in 1992. It was thought that the move of Woodside to the western end of the central business district would draw other resources companies to the area.

The plans originally included the construction of a hotel adjacent to the new office tower on the Hay Street side of the site. The 13-storey hotel was to be a 220-room 5-star Stamford Hotel. The hotel, which was expected to cost $50 million, was put on hold by Stamford Land Corporation (the new name for Hai Sun Hup) in 2001 and construction would only proceed if the local hotel market became strong enough. A 13-level, 13,000-square-metre (140,000 sq ft) A-grade office tower was proposed for the site by Stamford Land Corporation in 2008.

== Design ==
The tower was designed by architects Kann Finch Group. It features 251 basement car parking bays, a bar on the ground floor, shops, a 120-seat auditorium on the mezzanine level and a fully equipped gym.

The structure is of concrete frame, with a conventionally reinforced jump-formed core containing all of the lifts, stairs and service risers. The office floors are formed from post-tensioned band beams supporting conventional reinforced slabs. The perimeter of the building has columns spaced 8.2 metres (27 ft) apart and supporting post-tensioned edge beams. The support columns were formed from 80 MPa (12,000 psi) concrete to minimise the column size at ground level.

The building has two basement levels, two plant floor levels, 23 office floor levels, a mezzanine and the ground floor, giving a total of 29 floors. The building has a total floor area of 77,000 m^{2} (830,000 sq ft), of which 46,000 m^{2} (500,000 sq ft) is lettable. The building is divided into three elevator zones: low-rise, mid-rise and high-rise. Four generators and a 60,000-litre (16,000 US gal) fuel tank allow the tower to operate without any external electricity for up to four days.

The tower is noted for its efforts towards efficient energy use. For instance, the building's air conditioning plant utilises variable-speed fans to consume less energy when extra cooling is unnecessary, and the floors are divided into several air conditioning zones. Internal lighting dims when natural ambient light is brighter, and the heat load of the building is reduced through the use of "low emissivity" glass on the building's facade. The building also implements water-saving measures through the installation in early 2008 of waterless urinals, saving an estimated 9 million litres (2.4 million US gallons) of water each year.

== Refurbishment ==
Following the departure of flagship tenant Woodside to Mia Yellagonga at the end of 2018, the building underwent a moderate $30-60 million refurbishment with works on the foyer completed in 2019. Macquarie Group obtained signage rights for the building along with a lease for the top two floors in 2019.
