= Charles Court =

Australian politician (1911–2007)

The Honourable Sir Charles Court AK KCMG OBE
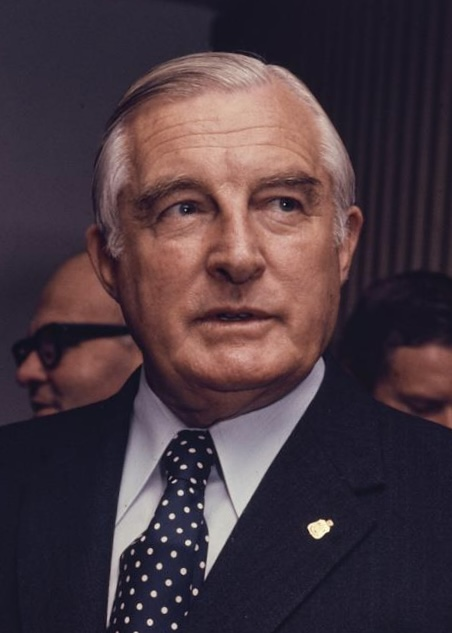
- Court in 1974

21st Premier of Western Australia
- In office 8 April 1974 – 25 January 1982
- Monarch: Elizabeth II
- Governor: Sir Hughie Edwards; Sir Wallace Kyle; Sir Richard Trowbridge
- Deputy: Ray McPharlin; Sir Des O'Neil; Ray O'Connor
- Preceded by: John Tonkin
- Succeeded by: Ray O'Connor

Leader of the Opposition
- In office 5 June 1972 – 8 April 1974
- Premier: John Tonkin
- Preceded by: Sir David Brand
- Succeeded by: John Tonkin

Minister for Industrial Development
- In office 2 April 1959 – 3 March 1971
- Premier: Sir David Brand
- Preceded by: Frank Wise
- Succeeded by: Herb Graham

Leader of the Western Australian Liberal Party
- In office 5 June 1972 – 25 January 1982
- Deputy: Sir Des O'Neil; Ray O'Connor
- Preceded by: Sir David Brand
- Succeeded by: Ray O'Connor

Member of the Western Australian Legislative Assembly for Nedlands
- In office 14 February 1953 – 25 January 1982
- Preceded by: David Grayden
- Succeeded by: Richard Court

Personal details
- Born: Charles Walter Michael Court; 29 September 1911 Crawley, Sussex, England
- Died: 22 December 2007 (aged 96) Cottesloe, Western Australia
- Resting place: Karrakatta Cemetery
- Party: Liberal Party (from 1946)
- Spouses: Rita Steffanoni (m. 1936; died 1992) Judith Mildred Butt (m. 1997)
- Children: 5, including Richard Court
- Relatives: Margaret Court (daughter-in-law)
- Profession: Accountant

Sir Charles Walter Michael Court AK KCMG OBE (29 September 1911 – 22 December 2007) was an Australian politician who was the premier of Western Australia from 8 April 1974 to 25 January 1982. A member of the Liberal Party, Court was the member for Nedlands in the Parliament of Western Australia from 1953 to 1982. He held multiple portfolios during this time, including as the minister for industrial development from 1959 to 1971, when he became known for developing Western Australia's mining industry.

Born in England, Court's family migrated to Perth when Court was a baby. He grew up in a working-class family in Leederville and Shenton Park. Court's political beliefs became conservative as a young adult when working as an accountant during the Great Depression. He soon married and moved to Nedlands, where he lived most of his life. During World War II, Court served in the Second Australian Imperial Force in Bougainville Island, which earned him an Order of the British Empire. He joined the Liberal Party in 1946 and was elected to parliament at the 1953 state election.

Court became deputy leader of the Liberal Party in 1957 and a minister after the party won the 1959 state election, serving under Premier David Brand. As the minister for industrial development, Court oversaw the Ord River Scheme, the development of the Kwinana industrial area, and the beginning of extensive iron ore mining in the Pilbara after the federal government lifted an embargo on iron ore exports. As the minister for railways from 1959 to 1967, Court oversaw the gauge standardisation project. Court lost his portfolios when the Liberal Party lost the 1971 state election.

After Brand's retirement in 1972, Court became the Liberal Party's leader. The following day, he was knighted. Court became premier and treasurer upon the party's victory in the 1974 state election. During his eight years as premier, Court continued to promote mining and industry, focusing on the North West Shelf Venture, an oil and gas project off the north-west coast of the state. Court also supported the arts by having the government purchase His Majesty's Theatre and initiating the Perth Cultural Centre. Court's strong opposition to Aboriginal land rights aroused controversy when Court supported Amax Petroleum's drilling at an Aboriginal sacred site on Noonkanbah Station. Other controversies included an amendment to the Police Act to prevent gatherings of more than three people in a public place and the closure of the Fremantle railway line in 1979. Court resigned as premier and from parliament in 1982. He was succeeded as the member for Nedlands by his son, Richard Court, who was premier himself from 1993 to 2001.

== Early life ==
Court was born on 29 September 1911 in Crawley, Sussex, England. He was the eldest of two sons of Rose Rebecca Rice and Walter James Court, a plumber. The name Charles came from his mother's brother, Walter from his father, and Michael because he was born on Michaelmas Day. The Court family left Crawley on 18 March 1912, bound for Western Australia. As the Port of Southampton was stifled by a coal strike, they travelled via Antwerp in Belgium, boarding the German ship Cassel. They arrived in Fremantle, Western Australia, on 1 May 1912. The family planned to return to Crawley within five years, but that never eventuated, first because Walter Court struggled to secure a job in Perth, then due to illness, then due to World War I.

The Court family spent their first eight years in Western Australia living in Leederville, just north of Perth. Walter Court eventually obtained a job digging sewerage and drainage trenches, where he formed a good enough impression that he was referred to a plumber who offered him a job. Walter later got injured, and then in January 1916, enlisted in the army. At the time, Rose was pregnant with their second son. Walter trained at Blackboy Hill Camp and left for France in March 1916. Six weeks later, Sydney Hugo Court was born. Charles shouldered heavy responsibility while his father was away. One time, when Walter's pay stopped coming through, Charles was sent down to the Perth Trades Hall to give a note to the union secretary.

Court's first three years of school were at the local infants' school. He then attended Leederville Primary School. Walter arrived home in May 1919. By then a lance corporal, Walter first served with the 177th Tunnelling Company and later with the Australian Electrical and Mechanical Miners and Builders Unit. Walter again found difficulty in securing a job. He found irregular work for plumbers H Rance and Son. As the economy improved, the work became more regular. Walter was a strong unionist and supported the Labor Party. He admired Labor premier Philip Collier and took Charles to union rallies. In 1921, the Court family purchased and moved into a house in West Subiaco (now Shenton Park), using a War Service Homes Scheme loan. In West Subiaco, Charles attended Rosalie Primary School, and from 1924 to 1926, he attended Perth Boys' School.

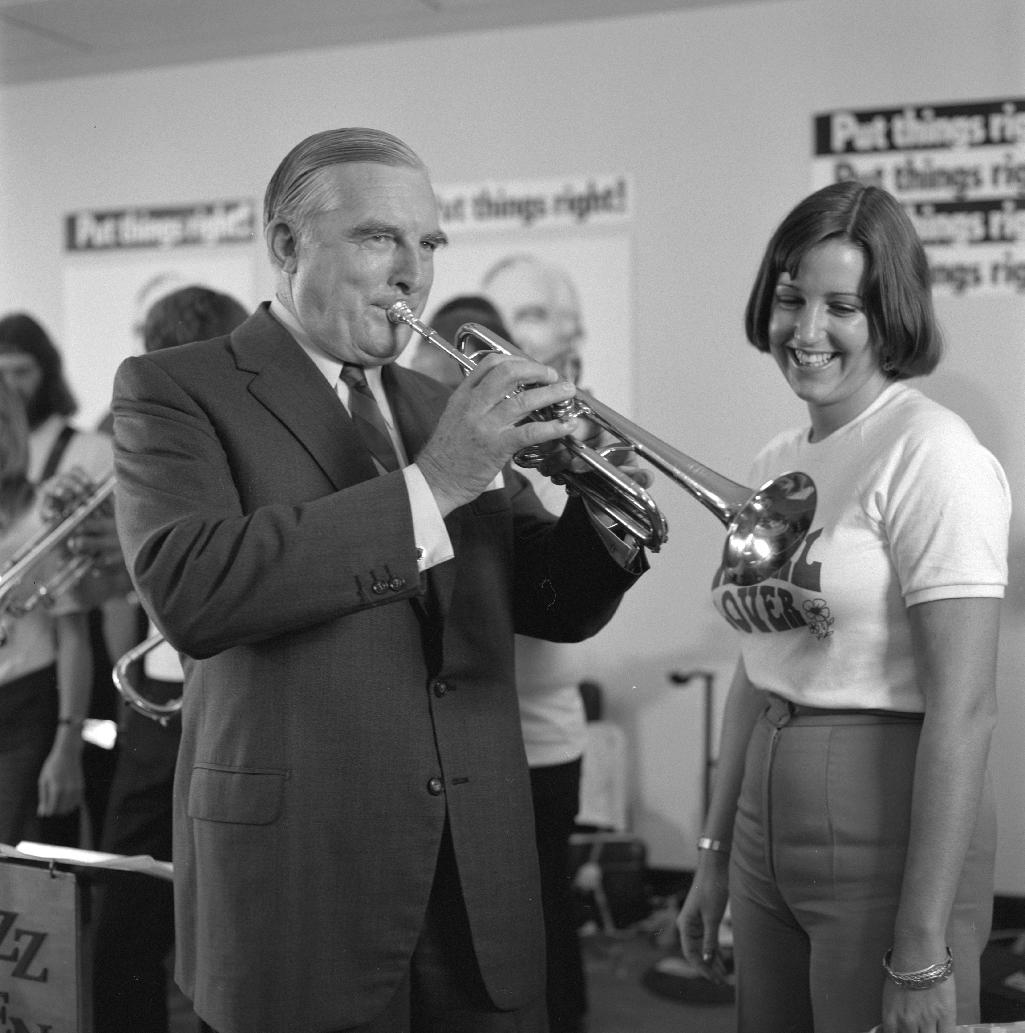
Court playing the trumpet in 1974

Meanwhile, in 1919, Court started learning to play the cornet and he soon joined a succession of local bands. Beginning at age 12, Court played in music competitions. He later joined the RSL band, which consisted of ex-servicemen. It was renamed the RSL memorial band so that Court could join, and he became the band's solo cornet. He also joined the Young Australia League band and the Metropolitan Symphony Orchestra, the latter of which got Court his first job. When he was 15, the secretary of the Metropolitan Symphony Orchestra asked the patron, Sir William Campion, who was also the governor of Western Australia, to put in a good word, which resulted in Court gaining a job as an office boy for law firm Robinson Cox & Wheatley.

=== Career ===
While working at the law firm, Court decided he wanted to become a lawyer, but found that he could not afford the five years as an articled clerk. He was instead articled to one of the law firm's auditors, J F Burkett and Co, later Burkett and McLaren. Court soon became a junior audit clerk, and then began studying an accountancy correspondence course at a technical school. During the Great Depression, Burkett and McLaren saw many bankruptcies, particularly from farmers and storekeepers. This influenced Court's political beliefs, pushing him to the conservative side of politics. Court turned 21 in 1932, so the first election he voted in was the state election in April 1933. The 1933 Western Australian secession referendum was held at the same time as the state election. Court voted in favour of secession. Although he would later become opposed to secession, Court throughout his life strongly opposed centralism.

Court passed his final exams for the Institute of Chartered Accountants in March 1933 and the Chartered Institute of Secretaries the following year. He then became a senior clerk, earning three pounds per week. He felt he was underpaid by a pound though, so after negotiations failed, he quit, believing he could earn as much playing the trumpet and start his own accountancy firm meanwhile. Jack Burkett, the son of one of the founders of Burkett and McLaren, joined Court's firm, and so it became Burkett and Court: Public Accountants. They established an office on St Georges Terrace, and borrowed furniture from Court's parents' home, unable to afford furniture themselves. One of Walter Court's acquaintances, a furniture businessowner, Harry Hearn, heard of the situation, and loaned them proper furniture interest free, confident that the son of Walter Court would be able to pay his debts. Over time, Burkett and Court became profitable and hired new staff, and after two years, was able to pay back Hearn. It was around this time that Court developed a negative opinion of trade unions, which he believed to be intolerant of his clients such as bank managers and creditors.

Court met his future wife Rita Steffanoni as he was asked by a family friend to play music at her 21st birthday party. They then met at several other events before they became partners. They became engaged in January 1935 and bought a house in Nedlands. Somewhat unusually, the title for the house was in her name rather than Court's, as he felt his financial situation was precarious. They married on 3 June 1936 at St Alban's Anglican Church in Highgate. Their first son, Victor Charles, was born on 13 February 1938, followed by Barrymore (Barry) Michael on 23 March 1941, Kenneth Walter on 11 December 1943, Richard Fairfax on 27 September 1947, and Geoffrey William on 30 May 1949.

Jack Burkett left the firm in 1937, leading to it becoming C W Court, Chartered Accountant. The business continued to expand and moved to a larger office, although Court himself still partially relied on playing music for his income. Later that year, Court was approached by two other accountants to join them in partnership. He agreed, and so Hendry Rae & Court was formed, operating out of Newspaper House on St Georges Terrace. Court joined the Australian Army in 1940 and returned to accounting in January 1946. Later that year, Rae retired, and Hendry retired several years after that. In 1944, Court was made a fellow of the Institute of Chartered Accountants; from 1946 to 1952, he was the institute's state registrar; from 1952 to 1955, he was on the state council; became a life member in 1982; and was voted chartered accountant of the year in 1984. In addition to his work with the firm, Court became a director for several companies. This was reduced when he became a member of parliament in 1953. He continued working at Hendry Rae & Court until he became a minister in 1959, and completely left the firm in 1970. Court was also elected by ratepayers to be the auditor for the Municipality of Claremont and was the chairman of the WA Prices Advisory Committee from 1948 to 1952. He was chosen for that role as he had performed well for the Master Bakers' Association before the war. The committee had the role of advising the government on the deregulation of price controls following the war.

=== In the Australian Army ===
Court volunteered to join the Second Australian Imperial Force (AIF) in January 1940, but was rejected due to manpower restrictions as he was an accountant. He then got written consent from Hendry, Rae, and some clients, and enlisted in the Australian Military Force (AMF). He was allowed to join the AMF as its members did not serve outside Australia, but its members were allowed to join the AIF after three months. Not wanting to end up in an army band, Court asked to join an AMF corps without one, which meant he enrolled in the Army Service Corps as a private on 5 September 1940. In his first few months in the army, Court was occasionally released to work at Hendry Rae & Court as part of the manpower restrictions. Court was quickly promoted, having been a lance corporal, corporal, sergeant, and lieutenant "on probation" by 5 November. He was promoted to a permanent lieutenant in July 1941. Court's commanding officer, Major Ennis, soon told him to form and lead a band, but not wanting to be involved with a band, Court struck a deal that he would form a really good band before being allowed to leave it to concentrate on being a soldier. Court recruited experienced musicians who were about to join the army and people who he had played with in previous bands.

By January 1942, Court had successfully applied to transfer to the AIF and became a lieutenant in the 1st Armoured Division in Victoria. Court was soon promoted to captain. His commanding officer, Horace Robertson, asked that Court form a band, but Court managed to reach another deal where he would form the best band in the Australian Army before returning to being a soldier. Court went to a staff course at the Royal Military College, Duntroon, and the division was transferred to Mingenew, Western Australia. After the division's band won a competition against other service bands in Geraldton, Court returned to being a soldier. He was promoted to temporary major in August 1943 when he was made deputy assistant quartermaster-general, and later became a permanent major. He then moved to the Northern Territory in October 1943, with efforts to prepare for a possible Japanese invasion in the wake of the bombing of Darwin. In the Northern Territory, Court was injured twice during training. With no combat on the horizon, it was difficult to keep troops motivated. There were more air raids on Darwin in November 1943.

Court was asked to assess whether the region could cope with large numbers of US and Australian troops if General Douglas MacArthur chose to launch an invasion from Darwin to win back the Philippines. Court determined that it could, and the report was presented to an audience including General Thomas Blamey. Court's commanding officer, Arthur Allen, praised the report but Blamey said launching from the Northern Territory would be the worst option as it would be slow and cost many lives and much money. A report about Court's service in the Northern Territory said that "throughout his service with Northern Territory Force, Major Court has displayed devotion to duty of the highest order" and that Court "has been outstanding in every respect". In November 1944, Court was sent to the staff college in Cabarlah, Queensland, for more training.

On 3 April 1945, Court was sent to Bougainville Island in the territory of New Guinea, where Australian troops had taken over from American troops. By then, he was a lieutenant colonel and assistant quartermaster-general with the II Corps. Court got off to a rocky start as his commanding officer, Stanley Savige, initially did not like him. Savige did not trust Horace Robertson, so when Robertson told Savige that Court was "a first-class and outstanding officer", Savige believed the opposite. Savige told Court that unless he changed his mind in four weeks, Court would be transferred. General Allen wrote to Savige that Court would do well, which helped to persuade Savige to let Court stay. At the end of the four weeks, Savige told Court he could stay. Court's role in Bougainville was to manage the supply of ammunition, communication devices and medical supplies to troops in the jungle of Bougainville and nearby islands. Court went on some of the supply drops himself so that he "let the RAAF (Royal Australian Air Force) and Army crews know I was interested in their work and conscious of the danger and responsibility that was theirs when undertaking these missions". Court would also carry messages from Savige to commanders on the battlefront. Court was also tasked with leading a team to sever Japanese communications between the north and south of the island, but that mission was called off when intelligence officers determined the mission could not go ahead.

Court was a member of the Australian Surrender Commission when the Japanese formally surrendered at Bougainville on 8 September 1945. After the other staff officers left, Court became the senior Australian officer in charge. Court chose 70 soldiers and intelligence personnel to disarm the 23,500 Japanese soldiers and sailors. Masatane Kanda and Court were concerned that "fanatics" might try to shoot at the Australians, but no such thing happened. After that was complete, Court left for Torokina, where there were 30,000 Australian soldiers waiting to go home. Due to his service, Court was awarded an Order of the British Empire (OBE) in 1945. Court later said the OBE meant more to him than any other honour he had received as it had proved he had succeeded as a soldier. Court arrived back in Perth in December 1945 and was demobilised on 3 January, becoming a reserve officer.

== Early political career ==
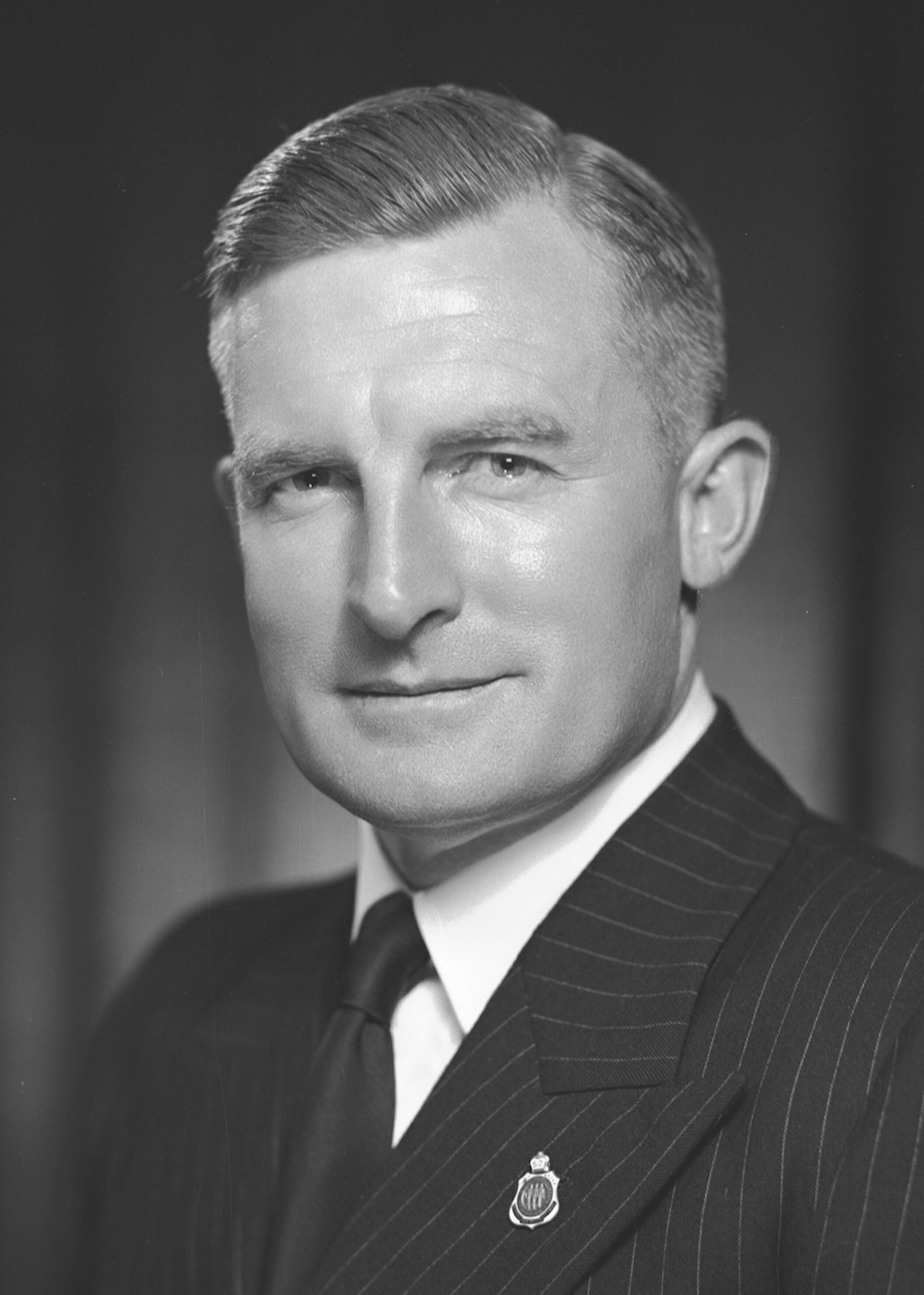
Court in 1952.

Court accepted an invitation from Harry Hearn to join the Liberal Party and form the Perth City Branch in 1946. Court helped the party during the 1947 state election campaign by convincing people to stand as candidates for the Liberal Party and helping them campaign. There was also some push for Court to be a candidate himself, but that did not eventuate. His reputation within the party grew throughout the campaign though. The campaign resulted in the defeat of Frank Wise's Labor government and the election of Ross McLarty's Liberal–CDL government. The Liberal Party was for the first time the senior party in the Coalition and it soon changed its name to the Liberal and Country League (LCL) to encourage CDL members to defect to the Liberals. The LCL–CDL Coalition won the following state election in 1950. In the electoral district of Nedlands, Court's future seat, long time Liberal MLA Norbert Keenan was not re-endorsed, so he ran as an independent candidate. Keenan was not re-elected, but his preferences resulted in the election of another independent, David Grayden.

Grayden soon introduced a private member's bill called "The Protection of Trade Act 1951", which was supported by Labor and the CDL but not the Liberals, and worried businessmen. The Liberals decided they needed a candidate in Nedlands with a business background. The Liberal candidate in 1950, Cyril Bird, declined to stand again in the 1953 state election, and another potential candidate, Cyril Dudley, Keenan's campaign director, chose not to as well. Court was asked to stand as a candidate by a deputation of a dozen businessmen, including Lance Brisbane, Harry Hearn, and Fred Johnston, but declined. Three months later, another deputation asked him to stand. Court told them that there were other, more suitable candidates, but they told him he was the most popular in Shenton Park, the most Labor-leaning part of the electorate of Nedlands. Court was reluctant to stand as a candidate, as his business career would be put on hold, but he eventually agreed, promising to leave politics after two terms, or six years, in parliament.

In a preselection meeting in August 1952, the party endorsed three candidates: Grayden, Court, and Peter Aldred. Grayden refused the nomination and Court threatened to step down, but was convinced not to. Court would later say the campaign was a "nightmare", as people were confused why the Liberal Party endorsed two candidates. Premier McLarty tried to convince Court to transfer to the electoral district of Leederville, where he grew up. McLarty was in talks with Grayden to convince him to drop the protectionist bill if the Liberal Party were to support Grayden, which was undermining Court's campaign. During the campaign, Court received support from Stanley Savige. Grayden's election materials said that he would make service to his electorate "his full-time duty", implying that Court would remain involved with his business. Court ended up winning by 837 out of 8777 votes on a two-party-preferred basis. He was the only new Liberal member elected, and the Liberal Party ended up losing the overall election to the Labor Party. Bert Hawke was soon sworn in as Premier and Court found himself in the opposition.

Aubrey Coverley, the Labor member for Kimberley, died in March 1953, necessitating a by-election for the seat of Kimberley. Court was the only opposition member who campaigned in the by-election as the seat was previously uncontested by any other party and it was believed to be a safe seat for Labor. John Rhatigan of the Labor Party ended up winning and Court gained experience in a part of the state he had not been to previously. The north of Western Australia was isolated and undeveloped and Court saw that it needed to be developed. It soon became apparent that Court would one day become a government minister and eventually the deputy leader of the LCL, although Court still believed he would exit parliament after six years. Opposition Leader McLarty and Deputy Opposition Leader David Brand would ask for Court's opinions, and soon, he was put on the frontbench. The Labor Party attacked Court for his business background, saying that he had no understanding of working-class people. Court's friend, Alf Curlewis, said that "they don't realise it but they're making you famous. The worst thing that could happen, if they only knew it, was to ignore you." Some Liberal colleagues felt indignation over the attention Court had.

Having developed a reputation for campaigning for Liberal candidates, Court was asked to campaign for Fred Chaney in the 1955 federal election against Tom Burke, who had held the Division of Perth for 14 years. The campaign was successful; Chaney defeated Burke to win the seat of Perth. In the 1956 state election, the only candidate to oppose Court was Grayden. Court easily won re-election, receiving 73 percent of the vote, but the LCL overall went backwards, losing four seats. McLarty resigned as LCL leader in 1957, suffering from ill health, allowing for Brand to be elected leader and Court to be elected deputy leader in March that year. It was the elevation of Brand to party leader that convinced Court to stay in politics for longer than six years. Court believed McLarty was a poor leader, but with Brand instead, Court could move forward with his push to develop the northern parts of the state.

Interested in developing the northern areas of Western Australia, Court set up and was chair of the North West and Kimberleys Committee, which developed LCL policy to take to the 1959 state election. Court presented the policy to the party's State Council for adoption. However, the federal members did not approve of the policy as it was seen as undermining the Menzies federal government and that they believed the state would request hundreds of millions of dollars to pay for the towns, railways, and ports that were needed. They told Court that there would not be any federal funding for the proposed developments in the north. The State Council ended up endorsing the policy, but there was controversy when the minute taker wrote that the policy had not been endorsed. Court disputed the minutes at the next council meeting, and so the policy was adopted.

Court was re-elected unopposed in Nedlands, so he could focus on campaigning in the rest of the state, especially in the north. Overall, the LCL gained six seats from the Labor Party, enough for the LCL, alongside the Country Party, to win a one-seat majority.

== Brand government ==
The Brand–Watts ministry was sworn in on 2 April 1959. Court was appointed as the minister for industrial development, minister for railways, and minister for the North-West. The Country Party had asked that one of its members be the minister for railways, but after the election, the party said that it had no one that could fulfil the role. The railway system was run down at the time and there would inevitably be closures of some lines, so Court believed that no Country MP wanted to do this. Brand made Court the minister for railways, saying that the Country Party would want the portfolio "in a few weeks". That never happened, so Court continued as the minister for railways for eight years.

The Department of Industrial Development had received little attention from the previous minister, Frank Wise. There were only fourteen staff members, only four of them were permanent, and there was no CEO.

From 16 March 1965, Court took over as the minister for transport from James Craig. He also had Ray O'Connor appointed as an honorary minister assisting the minister for railways and transport. Following the passage of the Constitution Acts Amendment Act 1965 in August that year, the ministry was expanded by two, allowing O'Connor to take over from Court as the minister for transport. From 16 February 1967, O'Connor also took over as the minister for railways.

David Brand lost the 1971 state election, and so Court was removed from the ministry.

=== Railways ===
In 1957, the Hawke government established a royal commission into the Western Australian Government Railways (WAGR). Court was highly critical of the royal commission, and had it finished soon after he became the minister for railways. In July 1959, Court appointed former Tasmanian Government Railways general manager Cyril Wayne as the new commissioner of the WAGR. Court and Wayne held regular meetings on Saturday mornings. Court found that the WAGR system was run down and poorly maintained. He had running sheds in country towns replaced or upgraded and old and low-capacity wagons scrapped. He also outsourced work being done at the Midland Railway Workshops and reduced the number of employees at the workshop by about 25 percent. Poorly patronised passenger trains were replaced with buses, and some routes were completely withdrawn. By the 1962 financial year, the WAGR made a profit for the first time since 1946.

In 1960, the state government reached an agreement with BHP that the government would build a standard-gauge railway between Koolyanobbing and Kwinana by the end of 1968 so that BHP could build a blast furnace, steel plant and additional wharfs at Kwinana and an iron ore mine at Koolyanobbing. Wayne wanted the existing narrow-gauge railways upgraded instead, but Court chose to build a whole new standard-gauge railway between Kalgoorlie and Fremantle and Kwinana, which would link to the existing standard-gauge Trans-Australian Railway at Kalgoorlie and provide a rail link to the eastern states via a single gauge for the first time. Court had to negotiate with the federal government for funding the gauge standardisation project, which was too expensive for the state to handle. Court and Brand travelled to Canberra to talk to Menzies government ministers, securing a funding agreement in 1961. The project was officially announced in August 1961. It was to cover a distance of 800 kilometres (500 mi) and cost $82 million, of which $53.6 million was funded by the state. Court negotiated with the Commonwealth government in 1963 for several variations to the agreement, including the route through the Avon Valley, through the Perth metropolitan area, and near Koolyanobbing. The standard-gauge railway was completed in August 1968, a year after Court ceased being the minister for railways.

== In opposition ==
David Brand resigned as leader of the Liberal Party in May 1972. Court was elected unopposed as party leader and thus leader of the opposition; Des O'Neil was elected deputy leader. There was an attempt by some MPs to put up a token candidate so that Court did not take his leadership for granted, but this fell through. The day after the leadership ballot, Court was knighted "in recognition of service to the government of WA".

Throughout his time as opposition leader, Court attempted to pass a motion of no confidence in the Tonkin government and have the governor install Court as premier instead, or alternatively force an early election. He attempted this in mid-September 1972, following the government's decision to provide a guarantee for a private loan for the construction of a new trades hall building. The government survived with the casting vote of the speaker. Following Labor's poor result in the 1973 Balcatta by-election, Court attempted to convince the Legislative Council to block a supply bill, saying that Labor had lost its mandate. After the supply bill was delayed by several weeks, the Legislative Council ultimately decided to guarantee supply.

The 1974 state election occurred on 30 March 1974.

== Court government ==
The Court–McPharlin ministry was sworn in by Governor Hughie Edwards on 8 April 1974. Court was sworn in as premier, treasurer, and minister coordinating economic and regional development.

In May 1975, the National Country Party left the Coalition due to a policy dispute between McPharlin and Court. The National Country Party re-joined the Coalition later that month after McPharlin was replaced as leader by Dick Old. The ministry was reconstituted as the Court ministry, which resulted in deputy Liberal leader Des O'Neil gaining the position of Deputy Premier instead of the National Party leader.

From 18 June 1975 to 22 December 1975, Court was also the minister for federal affairs, a new position. He was succeeded by Ian Medcalf.

=== Tresillian controversy ===
In 1974, under the Tonkin government, the Tresillian, a former maternity hospital in Court's seat of Nedlands, was converted to a home for mentally ill children without consultation with the residents or Nedlands council. Protests and objections soon began to occur, with the council saying the area was unsuitable for the centre. Groups in support of the Tresillian centre appeared as well. Court believed that Nedlands was unsuitable for the Tresillian centre, and had the Health Department sell the land to the City of Nedlands in anticipation of moving the centre to Forrestfield, a location that was criticised by parents for being too far away from the city. The Trades and Labour Council blocked the move, and so Court issued an ultimatum that any staff who prevented children moving to the site at Forrestfield would be sacked and the children returned to their homes. Five Liberal MPs and a National Country MP criticised the decision, and Ray Young resigned as cabinet secretary on 20 July 1976. That day, Court changed his mind, allowing patients at Tresillian to stay until December 1977.

=== Arts and culture ===
The Court government purchased His Majesty's Theatre from the private landowner, Norman Rydge. The first attempt to purchase the theatre in 1976 fell through when the government could not agree on a price with Rydge. The minister for cultural affairs, Graham MacKinnon, then announced plans for the government to build its own theatre complex with three individual theatres. After Court's insistence, the sale was back on three days later. From 1977 to 1980, the theatre was restored.

As part of celebrations of the 150th anniversary of Western Australia, the new building for the Art Gallery of Western Australia was opened by Charles Court in 1979.

=== Police Act ===
In an attempt to stop protests and strikes, the rate at which had been increasing since the late 1960s, the Court government amended Section 54B of the Police Act in November 1976 so that a permit from the police commissioner was required for a gathering of more than three people in a public place. The amendment said that "reasonable grounds" were required for refusal but that there was no right to an appeal. Section 54B was amended in September 1979 after a spate of arrests due to it. It was changed so that any assembly was lawful until it was prohibited, and public meetings and places were more clearly defined. The Labor Party criticised the bill, saying the amendments did not go far enough and Labor Leader Ron Davies unsuccessfully sought to delete Section 54B entirely. It was eventually deleted in 1984 after Labor gained power.

=== Oil and natural gas ===
One of Court's focuses was the creation of a major source of energy for Western Australia. He believed that cheap energy was needed to overcome Australia's high labour costs so that processing, particularly the refining of steel, would be economical. In 1964, WAPET discovered a small amount of oil at Barrow Island and a small amount of natural gas near Dongara. When the minister for energy, Crawford Nalder, failed in negotiating with WAPET on behalf of the State Electricity Commission, Court took over and came to an agreement with WAPET. Alcoa Australia also reached an agreement with WAPET to supply gas to alumina refineries in Kwinana Beach and Pinjarra and Midland Brick reached an agreement as well, and so the Parmelia Pipeline between Dongara and Pinjarra via Perth opened in 1971.

In May 1963, Woodside (Lakes Entrance) Oil (now known as Woodside Energy) was granted an exploration lease covering over 160,000 square kilometres (62,000 sq mi) of the North West Shelf off the Pilbara coast. Woodside was joined by Shell and Burmah Oil in 1964, and by California Asiatic Oil (now Chevron) and BP in 1966, forming the joint venture partners of the North West Shelf Venture. Court maintained a close relationship with the joint venture partners. The first well drilled in 1967 was dry, and by the start of 1971, little oil or gas had been discovered. Court pushed for greater exploration though, and by the end of 1971, large gas reserves were discovered at North Rankin, 130 kilometres (81 mi) north of the Pilbara coast and 3,500 metres (11,500 ft) under the seabed. By that point, Labor had won the 1971 state election, and the party soon won the 1972 federal election as well. The Whitlam government's minister for minerals and energy, Rex Connor, was opposed to foreign investment in resource extraction, and wanted the distribution of natural gas to be nationalised. In light of this, the North West Shelf Venture was mothballed in 1973. However, after the Liberals won the 1974 state election and amid rising gas prices, the project was reopened in 1974.

Court met with Gough Whitlam and Connor several times in an attempt to convince them to hand back control of the offshore reserves to the state, but they did not budge from their position. Connor threatened to withhold from renewing the North West Shelf exploration permits, but state attorney-general Ian Medcalf and minister for industrial development Andrew Mensaros concluded that the state could legally renew the permits anyway. The joint venture participants were not convinced, so Court travelled to London and California to meet with the heads of the companies involved. He managed to convince them to sign the permits, and by the end of the year, the Whitlam government was dismissed and the Liberal Party had won the resulting election. Court managed to get the federal government to agree for most royalties to go to the state in exchange for the state funding and constructing the Dampier to Bunbury Gas Pipeline.

BHP bought out Burmah Oil's share in 1976 when Burmah Oil ran into financial difficulties, and in 1979, Mitsubishi Corporation and Mitsui & Co joined the project. In November 1979, cabinet approved the terms of an agreement to allow the North West Shelf Venture to go ahead, and in September 1980, Woodside announced the joint venture partners had agreed and that the project would go ahead. The State Energy Commission came to an agreement to receive 20 years of gas under a take-or-pay contract. This contract was controversial, with many people sceptical that the State Energy Commission required that much gas. The first domestic gas was delivered in August 1984. The joint venture partners had trouble coming to an agreement with the Japanese power companies they intended to export liquified natural gas (LNG) to. Court attempted to hurry along an agreement, including travelling to Japan in December 1981, but it was not until May 1985, several years after Court resigned, that the eight Japanese companies signed contracts for the supply of LNG.

=== Views on Aboriginal people and the Noonkanbah dispute ===
Court believed that Aboriginal Australians should assimilate into the dominant Australian culture, similar to the assimilation of migrants from European countries into Australian culture. He believed that education should be compulsory for Aboriginal children, and he regretted it when the Brand government's plans to implement compulsory education did not succeed. Court believed that access to alcohol by Aboriginal people should be restricted by providing vouchers to Aboriginal people to by food, clothing and shelter. He attempted to persuade Prime Minister Malcolm Fraser of this idea, but the idea was rejected as the United Nations would not have approved. In the 1960s, Court believed mining companies should train Aboriginal people to replace the lost jobs in the pastoral industry. This never occurred though, due to what Court said were "stupid bureaucrats" who stopped him.

The Noonkanbah dispute was one of the most controversial aspects of Court's premiership and became a cause célèbre for Aboriginal land rights. Court was strongly opposed to Aboriginal land rights, as he believed the same laws should apply to all Australians, that land rights would in effect create "separate countries", and that Aboriginal people would be manipulated for political reasons. In 1976, the Commonwealth government's Aboriginal Land Fund Commission bought Noonkanbah Station, a property of slightly less than 400,000 hectares (990,000 acres), for the Yungngora Aboriginal community, granting a pastoral lease to the Noonkanbah Pastoral Company. Over the following years, hundreds of resource tenements were pegged, including by American company Amax Petroleum, who was exploring for oil. Concerns for sacred sites at Noonkanbah soon became apparent, with several sites damaged during exploration by Amax. The Aboriginal Legal Service told Amax in April 1979 that the Yungngora community opposed all exploration and mining on Noonkanbah, and in May 1979, the Yungngora community presented a petition to Opposition Leader Ron Davies calling for miners to be kept out.

After Amax stated its intention to begin drilling near Pea Hill, a sacred site, the Aboriginal Legal Service accused Amax of being in breach of the Aboriginal Heritage Act. The Act made it an offence to "knowingly alter or damage an Aboriginal site or object on or under an Aboriginal site". The Crown Solicitor agreed with the Aboriginal Legal Service, however Court disagreed, saying that "we will have all sorts of 'sacred sites' coming up every time we want to move in these areas". He also believed that it was urgent to get onshore drilling started. A meeting at Noonkanbah station between the Mines Department, the Aboriginal Affairs Department, the Western Australian Museum and the newly-formed Kimberley Land Council came to an agreement that the site was sacred and that no drilling should occur until the Museum completed an investigation.

In mid-1979, Peter Bindon, an anthropologist and archaeologist working for the museum conducted an investigation of the Pea Hill site. He concluded that the "whole area within which any drill hole could be located by the company falls under the influence of the special sites shown to me by the Aborigines of the clan descent group for that area." The phrase "area of influence" was controversial, and Court used this to argue that this line of reasoning could prevent resource exploration anywhere in Western Australia. Court declared that "no responsible government could accept" this. He also questioned the Noonkanbah community's ties to the land. The minister for cultural affairs, Peter Jones, instructed the museum's trustees to allow drilling on Noonkanbah station anyway. In June 1979, upon arriving at Noonkanbah station, Amax and the Mines Department found that the Yungngora community had locked the gates and there were 40 people blocking access as well. Days later, the Aboriginal Legal Service obtained an interim injunction from the Supreme Court of Western Australia barring drilling from going ahead. Amax successfully fought to have the injunction lifted, but by then, the wet season had arrived an drilling was not possible until 1980.

In July 1980, surveyors for Amax tried to enter Noonkanbah station, but were stopped by residents. The government took control of the road entering the station and 4 hectares (10 acres) of land under its control to allow Amax to enter. After union bans prevented a water drilling rig from being transported to the site, the Mines Department transported its own water drilling rig to the site instead. To transport a petroleum drilling rig from Perth to Noonkanbah, a 2,240-kilometre (1,390 mi) journey, the government provided a police escort to prevent protests from blocking the drilling rig. The convoy left Perth on 7 August. Eight union officials who were protesting were arrested along the way. North of Port Hedland, approximately 160 Aboriginal people blockaded a bridge. Near Noonkanbah, the Yungngora people had parked vehicles across the road and chained them together. The convoy arrived at the site on 13 August. The media universally condemned the situation.

The exploration ended with no oil being found. Court for the rest of his life maintained that he would not have done anything different regarding the Noonkanbah dispute. Despite Court's claim that the Yungngora people did not have genuine ties to the area, the Yungngora people were granted native title over 1,811 square kilometres (699 sq mi) of land, including Noonkanbah station, in April 2007.

=== Fremantle line closure ===
During his time as the minister for railways in the 1960s, Court was supportive of Perth's suburban passenger railways over road transport, despite advice coming in that the suburban railways should be closed to passenger transport. In the 1977 state election, Court promised to upgrade the suburban railways. In January 1979 though, Court announced plans to close the Fremantle railway line, replace it with buses, and build a road in its place. Freight was to be diverted via the Kwinana to Woodbridge railway. The decision to close the Fremantle line was highly controversial. It was claimed the decision was made without consultation with Liberal MPs. Tom Dadour, the Liberal member for Subiaco, was outspoken against the decision. A petition with about 100,000 signatures (Note: Sources have claimed the petition had 95,000 or 100,000 signatures.) was presented to parliament urging the government to reconsider. Court defended the decision by saying the buses would be more frequent, more flexible, more comfortable, and cheaper to run.

The Fremantle line closed to passenger traffic on 2 September 1979; freight traffic continued until the southern route was possible for narrow-gauge trains. Unions placed a ban on contractors dismantling the railway. The line was reopened after the 1983 state election on 29 July 1983 by the Burke government. Court said later that "I never regretted what we did, but I realise it brought a lot of pain with it from a political point of view because it's so easy to stir up the emotions. Most of the people that signed the petition had probably never been on the train".

=== 1980 state election ===
Court had hoped that Des O'Neil would succeed him as premier, however after a period as acting premier, O'Neil decided against ever becoming premier. Court tried to convince him otherwise, but O'Neil retired at the February 1980 state election. Court announced the date of that election only a day before the rolls closed, stopping people from being able to enrol via post, which mainly impacted people living in rural areas, and in particular, Aboriginal voters. The election campaign ran for over six weeks. Court promoted the North West Shelf Project, the Wagerup and Worsley alumina projects, and the potential for mining uranium and diamonds. Opponents campaigned on environmental issues and industrial disputes.

The election resulted in the Liberal Party losing one seat to Labor: Ernie Bridge defeated Alan Ridge to win the electoral district of Kimberley. Three seats also changed hands from the National Country Party to the National Party.

The Liberal Party caucus selected Ray O'Connor as deputy leader, to the disappointment of Court, who thought O'Connor only won by "lobbying and ingratiating himself to members". Court believed O'Connor was not able to handle portfolios with large budgets, but thought he did "reasonably well with railways" and thought that his personality would help him deal with people. The vacancies in the ministry caused by the departures of Alan Ridge, Des O'Neil and Graham MacKinnon were filled by Gordon Masters, Bill Hassell and Bill Grayden. The ministry was expanded by two with the addition of two honorary ministers: Ian Laurance and Barry MacKinnon. Court's one major error when allocating portfolios was taking industrial development from Andrew Mensaros and giving it to National Country MP Peter Jones as Mensaros was retiring soon and Court wanted to ensure someone else understood the portfolio. Mensaros took this as a demotion and some Liberal MPs were concerned with giving such an important portfolio to a National Country member. Jones nonetheless performed well in the portfolio.

=== Retirement ===
Court wanted to retire from politics before turning 70, but he chose to delay his retirement to try and resolve the issues with commonwealth–state finances. By the end of 1981 though, having recently turned 70 years old, Court had decided to retire in January 1982. His wife had wanted him to retire, and by that point, there was a minority of Liberal MPs who wanted to replace Court as leader as they considered him too old. These MPs knew they would not be able to defeat Court in a leadership spill, so they aimed to cause instability in the party to change public opinion. Court announced his retirement on 18 December 1981. The Liberal Party elected Ray O'Connor to succeed him and Cyril Rushton as deputy. Court officially resigned as premier and as a member of parliament on 25 January 1982. He was succeeded as the member for Nedlands by his son Richard Court.

The Liberal Party lost the 1983 state election. Court believed he could have won it, and regretted retiring before it. Ian Thompson, a Liberal MP, criticised Court in 1991, saying that he did not allow "people to grow under his leadership" and that he created "a vacuum behind him". Court said that his failure to develop a successor was his worst political mistake, blaming it on the assumption that Des O'Neil would succeed him. He said the role of premier was "beyond O'Connor's ability and integrity".

== After politics ==
In April 1982, Court opened an office in the Perpetual Trustees Building on St George's Terrace to provide advice to small and large businesses. Court said that he did not charge any fees, and he detested other former politicians who charged high fees for consulting. The Western Mail reported that Court's advice was in high demand. During O'Connor's time as premier, Court offered advice and tried to influence the government, particularly regarding Aboriginal land rights and unions.

Court had an interest in increasing trade with Taiwan alongside Ken Court, and in July 1984, he became an inaugural co-chairman of the Taiwan Trade Association (now known as the Australia–Taiwan Business Council). Court helped with the licencing of Westpac and ANZ banks in Taiwan.

== Family ==
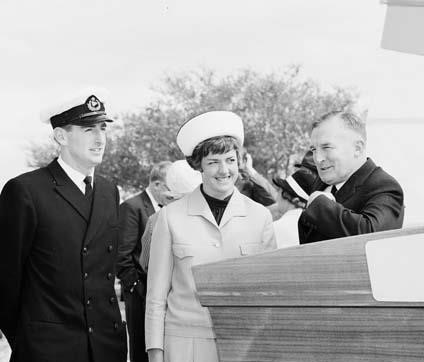
From left to right: Barry Court, Margaret Court, and Charles Court, in 1967

Court's wife Rita died on 18 October 1992. He remarried on 22 June 1997 to Judith Mildred Butt, a nurse. The wedding took place at St Stephen's Anglican Church in Serpentine.

Richard Court served as premier of Western Australia from February 1993 to February 2001. Victor Court attempted to enter politics by contesting the 1990 senate vacancy caused by the resignation of Fred Chaney, but was beat in Liberal preselection by Ian Campbell. Ken Court attempted to enter politics several times. He sought Liberal preselection for the Division of Curtin for the 1987 federal election, but was defeated by the incumbent MP Allan Rocher. He sought preselection for Curtin again for the 1996 federal election and won, but was defeated in the election by Rocher, who was now an independent. Barry Court was president of the Western Australian Liberal Party from March 2008 to August 2011. He is married to Margaret Court, former world number one tennis player.

== Death ==
In April 2007, Court was hospitalised due to a stroke. He moved into a nursing home in Cottesloe and had another stroke later that year. Court died aged 96 on 22 December 2007 in the nursing home. He was survived by his wife Judy, five sons, 16 grandchildren and 19 great-grandchildren. A private service was held and the state funeral was held on 4 January 2008 at Winthrop Hall at the University of Western Australia. Governor of Western Australia Ken Michael and Governor-General Michael Jeffery spoke at the funeral. Also in attendance were former prime ministers John Howard and Malcolm Fraser.

== Honours ==
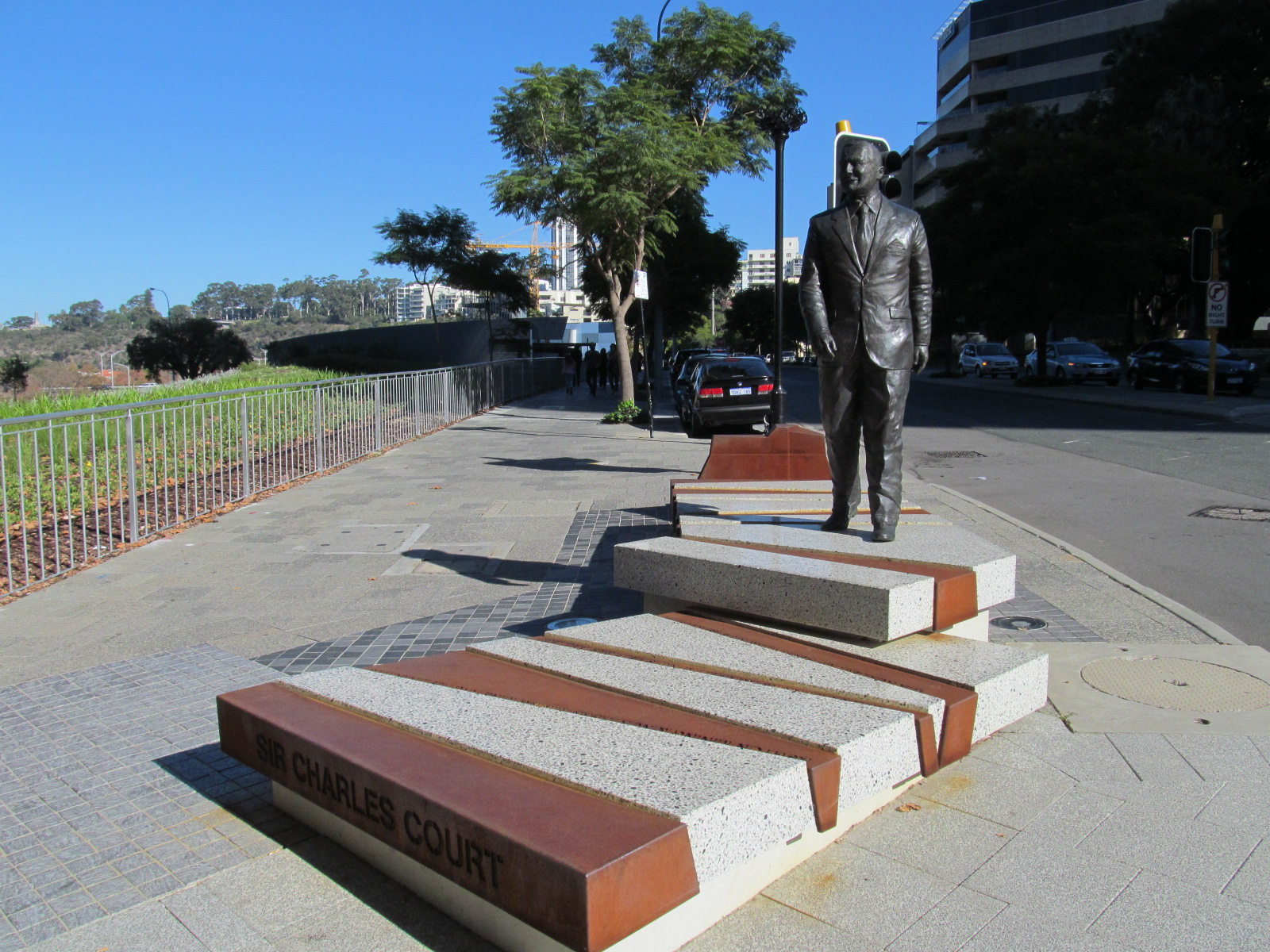
Statue of Court by Tony Jones on the corner of St Georges Terrace and Mount Street in the Perth central business district

British honours and Australian honours and awards received by Charles Court:

- 1947: Order of the British Empire, for distinguished service in the South West Pacific
- 1972: Knight Bachelor, in recognition of service to the government of Western Australia
- 1979: Knight Commander of the Order of St Michael and St George
- 1982: Knight of the Order of Australia, in recognition of service to politics and local government
- 2001: Centenary Medal

A statue of Court outside St George's House on the corner of St Georges Terrace and Mount Street in the Perth central business district was unveiled by Governor Malcolm McCusker on 29 September 2011, 100 years since Court was born. The location is near Parliament House, Woodside Plaza, and the offices of other mining companies to symbolise Court's support of the mining industry. The statue was commissioned by Labor premier Alan Carpenter in 2008 after Court died; It cost $483,000 to build and was designed by artist Tony Jones.

In 2019, Serpentine–Jarrahdale Grammar School, a private school in Mundijong, was renamed to Court Grammar School in honour of the Court family. Charles Court's son Ken had been involved in the school since it opened in 2006 and was on the school's board at the time.

== See also ==
- Electoral results for the district of Nedlands

== Notes ==
Parliament of Western Australia
| Preceded by David Grayden | Member for Nedlands; 14 February 1953 – 25 January 1982 | Succeeded by Richard Court |
Political offices
| Preceded by Frank Wise | Minister for Industrial Development; 2 April 1959 – 3 March 1971 | Succeeded by Herb Graham |
| Preceded by Harry Strickland | Minister for Railways; 2 April 1959 – 16 February 1967 | Succeeded by Ray O'Connor |
| Preceded by Harry Strickland | Minister for the North-West; 2 April 1959 – 3 March 1971 | Succeeded by Herb Graham |
| Preceded by James Craig | Minister for Transport; 16 March 1965 – 17 August 1965 | Succeeded by Ray O'Connor |
| Preceded by Sir David Brand | Leader of the Opposition; 5 June 1972 – 8 April 1974 | Succeeded by John Tonkin |
| Preceded by John Tonkin | Premier of Western Australia; 8 April 1974 – 25 January 1982 | Succeeded by Ray O'Connor |
| Preceded by John Tonkin | Treasurer of Western Australia; 8 April 1974 – 25 January 1982 | Succeeded by Ray O'Connor |
| New title | Minister for Federal Affairs; 18 June 1975 – 22 December 1975 | Succeeded by Ian Medcalf |
Party political offices
| Preceded by Sir David Brand | Deputy Leader of the Western Australian Liberal Party; 1 March 1957 – 5 June 1972 | Succeeded by Sir Des O'Neil |
| Preceded by Sir David Brand | Leader of the Western Australian Liberal Party; 5 June 1972 – 25 January 1982 | Succeeded by Ray O'Connor |
