= Jonathan Huston =

Western Australian politician

Jonathan Huston MLA

Member of the Western Australian Legislative Assembly for Nedlands
- Incumbent
- Assumed office 8 March 2025
- Preceded by: Katrina Stratton

Personal details
- Party: Independent (since 2026)
- Other political affiliations: Liberal (Note: Huston's membership of the Liberal Party was intermittent, but he remained a member throughout the 2025 state election campaign and until 25 June 2026.)
- Military service
- Allegiance: Australia
- Branch: Australian Army
- Service years: 1980–1996
- Rank: Major
- Unit: Australian Intelligence Corps

Jonathan Huston is an Australian politician who is member of the Western Australian Legislative Assembly for the electoral district of Nedlands. He won his seat at the 2025 state election. He was elected as a Liberal Party candidate, but left the party in June 2026.

== Biography ==
Huston attended Aquinas College and the Royal Military College Duntroon. He served in the Australian Army Intelligence Corps, rising to the rank of major. He completed a Bachelor of Arts and a Master of Business. After leaving the military, Huston worked in the private sector including ventures such as the Tint A Car, Parkside Towbars, and Croissant Express chains.

== Political career and views ==
Huston has stated he was an "on and off" member of the Liberals before his candidacy. He previously left the Liberal Party in protest of rising debt levels under the government of Colin Barnett, and identifies as economically dry. Following his election, Huston was assigned to be opposition spokesman on deregulation, small business, public sector reform, and veterans.

Huston departed the parliamentary Liberal Party on 25 June 2026 to sit as an independent. He stated his departure was motivated by a desire to pursue increased mining royalties to fund a sovereign wealth fund and the abolition of payroll tax for the state.

Huston has opposed the Matilda Bay ferry terminal. He claimed that despite his opposition to the ferry terminal, he is not a NIMBY. He opposes the AUKUS security partnership, arguing that stationing nuclear submarines at HMAS Stirling would make the area an appealing military target.

Huston describes himself as a "soft Catholic".

== Notes ==
Western Australian Legislative Assembly
Preceded by Katrina Stratton	Member for Nedlands; 2025–present	Incumbent
