= Electoral district of Nedlands =

State electoral district of Western Australia

Nedlands Western Australia—Legislative Assembly
- Interactive map of electoral district boundaries from the 2025 state election
- State: Western Australia
- Dates current: 1930–present
- MP: Jonathan Huston
- Party: Independent
- Namesake: Nedlands
- Electors: 32,690 (2025)
- Area: 24 km^{2} (9.3 sq mi)
- Demographic: Metropolitan
- Coordinates: 31.97°S 115.81°E
Electorates around Nedlands:
Churchlands	Cottesloe	Perth
Cottesloe	Nedlands	South Perth
Bicton	Bicton	Bateman

Nedlands is a Legislative Assembly electorate in the state of Western Australia. Nedlands is named for the inner western Perth suburb of Nedlands, which falls within its borders.

== History ==
Nedlands was created at the 1929 redistribution, at which five new metropolitan electorates were created to replace former Goldfields seats in Parliament. Its first member was elected at the 1930 election, and for most of its first eight decades it was a safe seat for the Liberal Party and its predecessors. As such, it was held by a succession of senior non-Labor figures.

From 1953 to 2001, the seat was held by the Court family. Hon. Sir Charles Court won the seat in 1953, handing it to his son, Hon. Richard Court, in 1983. Charles served as Premier from 1974 to 1982, and Richard became Premier from 1993 to 2001. They are one of only three father-son combinations in Australia to have served as state premiers (including the Butlers in South Australia and the Cains in Victoria).

Its first member, Hon. Sir Norbert Keenan, was an Attorney-General, and five of its first six non-Labor members were promoted to cabinet or the opposition front bench.

=== Recent history ===
For many years, Labor usually ran dead in Perth's wealthy beachside suburbs. However, Nedlands had long been especially hostile territory for Labor. For example, at the 2001 state, won government on the second-largest swing against a sitting government in the state's history at the time. However, Labor was pushed into third place in Nedlands, though Court's own margin was cut to 4.93% by Independent candidate Liz Davenport, a prominent fashion designer and member of the Liberals for Forests party. In a "traditional" contest with Labor, Court would have easily retained his seat with a margin of 10.2 percent.

In the days after the election, Court was attempting to organise a succession whereby he and his deputy leader, Colin Barnett, the MLA for neighbouring Cottesloe, would both resign their seats. Federal Curtin MP Julie Bishop would resign her seat and hand it to Barnett, then run in the ensuing by-election to replace Court in Nedlands or Barnett in Cottesloe. Court would then hand the Liberal leadership to Bishop as soon as she was safely in the legislature. The aim was to prevent Barnett from succeeding Court. However, the plan ended up on the front page of The West Australian, Bishop decided against a switch to State politics, and Court retired from politics shortly afterward. At the resulting by-election in 2001, Sue Walker, a DPP lawyer, won the seat for the Liberals against the unrelated Steve Walker, a Greens candidate, who overtook the ALP on preferences.

Walker served in the Shadow Ministry in a variety of roles, most prominently as Shadow Attorney-General. Matt Birney attempted to remove her from the Ministry in March 2006, only to lose a leadership challenge by Paul Omodei, who immediately reinstated her. Walker resigned from the Liberal party on 8 February 2008 after Troy Buswell attained the leadership, sitting as an independent thereafter. She contested the 2008 state election, claiming significant local support in doing so. However, at the 2008 state election, Bill Marmion won the seat for the Liberal Party, defeating Walker by 10,266 to 9,280 on the two-candidate-preferred vote.

At the 2017 state election, Marmion suffered a two-party-preferred swing of almost 11 percent, dropping the Liberals' margin over Labor to 8.3 percent, the lowest since 1933.

The Labor Party won Nedlands for the first time at the landslide 2021 state election, with Katrina Stratton defeating Marmion on a swing almost as large as the one the Liberals suffered in 2017. Marmion lost over 16 percent of his primary vote from 2017, and Stratton defeated him after Green preferences flowed overwhelmingly to her.

== Geography ==
Nedlands is bounded by the Swan River to the south and southeast, Thomas Street and Kings Park to the east, Loch Street and Brockway Road to the west, and Cambridge Street to the north. Its boundaries include the suburbs of Crawley, Daglish, Dalkeith, Jolimont, Nedlands, Shenton Park, Subiaco, West Leederville, along with parts of Floreat and Wembley. Major features within the electorate include Subiaco Oval, Karrakatta Cemetery, Sir Charles Gairdner Hospital, University of Western Australia and Parliament House.

The 2007 redistribution, which took effect at the 2008 election, resulted in the seat losing most of Wembley and all of West Leederville while gaining part of Floreat and a non-residential section of Shenton Park north of the railway.

== Demographics ==
Nedlands and the neighbouring electorates of Churchlands to the north and Cottesloe to the west comprise the affluent western suburbs of Perth—the Australian Bureau of Statistics's SEIFA index (2001) ranked them as the highest three electorates by socio-economic status in Western Australia, with high scores on educational and employment opportunity. At the 2006 census, the median individual income in the Nedlands electorate, based on its 2005 boundaries, was $666 per week compared to $513 in the Perth metropolitan area, and the median weekly household income was $1,392 compared to $1,086 across Perth. 58.7% of the population were professionals or managers.

All three seats are traditionally safe Liberal seats, and are located almost entirely within the blue-ribbon federal Liberal seat of Curtin.

== Members for Nedlands ==
Member	Party	Term
Sir Norbert Keenan	Nationalist	1930–1945
Sir Norbert Keenan	Liberal	1945–1949
Sir Norbert Keenan	Liberal Country League	1949–1950
David Grayden	Independent Liberal	1950–1953
Sir Charles Court	Liberal Country League	1953–1968
Sir Charles Court	Liberal	1968–1982
Richard Court	Liberal	1982–2001
Sue Walker	Liberal	2001–2008
Sue Walker	Independent	2008
Bill Marmion	Liberal	2008–2021
Katrina Stratton	Labor	2021–2025
Jonathan Huston	Liberal	2025–2026
Jonathan Huston	Independent	2026–present

== Results ==
2025 Western Australian state election: Nedlands
Party	Candidate	Votes	%	±%
Liberal	Jonathan Huston	12,533	44.5	+9.6
Labor	Mary Monkhouse	6,977	24.8	−11.2
Greens	Viv Glance	4,065	14.4	+0.8
Independent	Rosemarie de Vries	2,524	9.0	+9.0
Independent	Cilla de Lacy	908	3.2	+3.2
One Nation	Alex Ironside	429	1.5	+1.5
Christians	Laura Yow	427	1.5	+1.5
Independent	Jonathan Hippisley	181	0.6	+0.6
Independent	Peter D. Dunne	129	0.5	+0.5
Total formal votes		28,173	97.4	−0.2
Informal votes		752	2.6	+0.2
Turnout		28,925	88.5	+4.1
Two-party-preferred result
Liberal	Jonathan Huston	14,845	52.7	+5.8
Labor	Mary Monkhouse	13,314	47.3	−5.8
Liberal gain from Labor		Swing	+5.8	
