= Sue Walker (politician) =

Australian politician

Member of the Western Australian Parliament for Nedlands
- In office 9 June 2001 – 23 September 2008
- Preceded by: Richard Court
- Succeeded by: Bill Marmion

Personal details
- Born: 14 September 1951 (age 75) Plymouth, England, United Kingdom
- Citizenship: Australian
- Party: Liberal Party (1978–2008); Independent (2008)
- Profession: Lawyer

Susan Elizabeth Walker (born 14 September 1951) is a British-born Australian politician. She represented the electorate of Nedlands in the Legislative Assembly of Western Australia between June 2001 and September 2008. Walker was originally elected as a Liberal member but turned independent in 2008.

== Early life ==
Walker was born in Plymouth, England and arrived in Western Australia in 1967. She was a Bachelor of Jurisprudence and Bachelor of Laws graduate at the University of Western Australia.

== Politics ==
A member of the Liberal Party since 1978, Walker entered parliament at the 2001 Nedlands by-election, replacing a former premier, Richard Court. She served as a shadow attorney-general under Paul Omodei, but resigned from the party in February 2008 following Troy Buswell's successful challenge for the party's leadership. Her stated reasons for leaving the party were the continued influence of both Brian Burke and Noel Crichton-Browne on State politics, as well as her party's support of a government decision to close a facility within her electorate. Walker remained in parliament as an independent until her defeat at the September 2008 State election by her replacement as Liberal candidate, Bill Marmion.
