= David Grayden =

Australian politician (1924–2003)

Member of the Legislative Assembly of Western Australia
- In office 25 March 1950 – 14 February 1953
- Preceded by: Sir Norbert Keenan
- Succeeded by: Charles Court
- Constituency: Nedlands

Personal details
- Born: David Ives; 25 May 1924 Perth, Western Australia
- Died: 9 June 2003 (aged 79) Sydney, New South Wales, Australia
- Party: Liberal
- Relatives: Bill Grayden (brother)
- Education: University of Western Australia; University of New England

David Grayden (né Ives; 25 May 1924 – 9 June 2003) was an Australian politician who was a member of the Legislative Assembly of Western Australia from 1950 to 1953, representing the seat of Nedlands.

Grayden was born in Perth to Ethel May (née Harper) and Aubrey Leonard Ives. His older brother was Bill Grayden, an MP at both state and federal level, while the brothers' maternal grandfather was businessman Nat Harper, who was also involved in politics. Their mother remarried in the 1930s, changing the brothers' surname to that of their step-father. Grayden spent part of his early childhood in the United Kingdom, but eventually returned to Perth, where he attended Wesley College. He went on to the University of Western Australia, graduating with a Bachelor of Arts degree. During World War II, Grayden enlisted in the Australian Army, serving in the Middle East and New Guinea. On his return to Australia, he became a director of the Winterbottom Motor Company, a prominent local motor vehicle distributor.

A state president of the Young Liberals, Grayden stood for parliament for the first time in 1948, contesting a by-election for the seat of Guildford-Midland as an endorsed Liberal candidate. At the 1950 state election, he failed to gain official endorsement, but won the seat of Nedlands as an "independent Liberal" candidate. His time in parliament was short-lived however, as he was defeated by Charles Court (a future Liberal premier) at the 1953 election. Grayden contested Nedlands for a third time at the 1956 election, but lost by an increased margin. After leaving politics, he worked as a company director in Perth for a period, before moving to New South Wales in the late 1950s. There, Grayden retrained as a schoolteacher, studying at the University of New England. He worked as a high school teacher until his retirement in 1984, and spent the rest of his life on the New South Wales Central Coast.
