= Norbert Keenan =

Lawyer and politician of Western Australia

The Honourable Sir Norbert Keenan QC
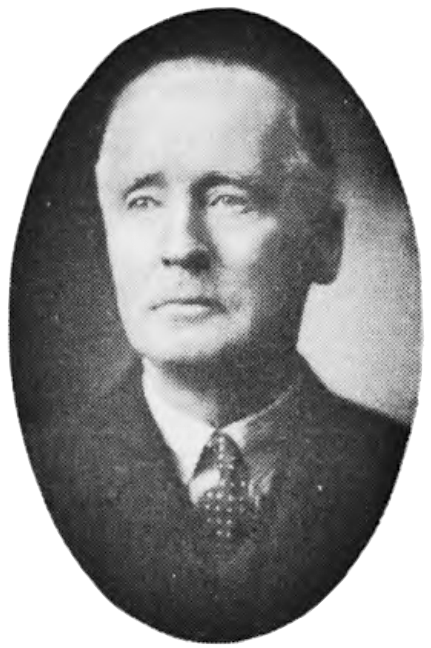

Leader of the Nationalist Party in Western Australia
- In office April 1933 – April 1938
- Preceded by: Sir James Mitchell
- Succeeded by: Ross McDonald

Member of the Legislative Assembly of Western Australia
- In office 27 October 1905 – 3 October 1911
- Preceded by: William Johnson
- Succeeded by: Albert Green
- Constituency: Kalgoorlie
- In office 12 April 1930 – 25 March 1950
- Preceded by: None (new creation)
- Succeeded by: David Grayden
- Constituency: Nedlands

Personal details
- Born: 30 January 1864 Glasnevin, County Dublin, Ireland
- Died: 24 April 1954 (aged 90) Subiaco, Western Australia
- Party: Nationalist (1930–1945); Liberal (after 1945)
- Other political affiliations: Independent (1904)
- Education: Trinity College Dublin

Sir Norbert Michael Keenan QC (30 January 1864 – 24 April 1954) was an Australian lawyer and politician who was a member of the Legislative Assembly of Western Australia from 1905 to 1911 and again from 1930 to 1950. He was the leader of the Nationalist Party from 1933 to 1938, during the time when it was the junior partner in the coalition with the Country Party. Keenan had earlier served as a minister in the government of Newton Moore (as attorney-general) and the second government of Sir James Mitchell.

== Early life ==
Keenan was born in Glasnevin, County Dublin, Ireland, to Elizabeth Agnes (née Quin) and Sir Patrick Joseph Keenan. His father was an educationalist and a member of the Privy Council of Ireland. Keenan was sent to Downside School (in Somerset, England) for his secondary schooling, and then studied law at Trinity College Dublin. He was admitted to King's Inns in 1890, allowing him to practise as a barrister in Ireland, and was later also admitted to the Middle Temple, allowing him to practise as a barrister in England and Wales. Keenan emigrated to Western Australia in April 1895, and settled in Kalgoorlie, where he represented the interests of British investors on the Eastern Goldfields. In June 1901, he was elected Mayor of Kalgoorlie, replacing Staniforth Smith. He served in the position until December 1905, resigning to concentrate on state politics.

== Political career ==
At the 1904 state election, Keenan unsuccessfully contested the seat of Kalgoorlie as an independent, losing to the sitting Labor member, William Dartnell Johnson. He reversed the result at the 1905 election, standing as a Ministerialist (a supporter of the government of Hector Rason). When Newton Moore replaced Rason as premier in May 1906, he chose Keenan to be his attorney-general. While in office, he chaired a Legislative Assembly select committee into Western Australia's electoral system, which recommended that the state adopt preferential voting and make various other changes. Credit for the resulting piece of legislation, the Electoral Act 1907, was largely given to Keenan, and the act is still in force. As a senior member of the government, Keenan also represented Western Australia at the 1907 Premiers' Conference. He resigned as attorney-general in May 1909, due to disagreements with the government's financial policies.

Keenan did not contest the 1911 state election, with his seat being lost to Albert Green of the Labor Party. He concentrated on his law practice, having been made King's Counsel (KC) in 1908, and also served on the senate of the University of Western Australia (UWA) from 1912 to 1918. After a gap of over 18 years, Keenan re-entered parliament at the 1930 state election, winning the newly created seat of Nedlands for the Nationalist Party. Just eleven days after being elected, he was included in the new ministry formed by Sir James Mitchell, taking the positions of Chief Secretary and Minister for Education. While in charge of the Education Department, Keenan made the unpopular decision to close Claremont Teachers College indefinitely, to save money during the Great Depression. He resigned from cabinet in September 1931, due to a dispute over government policy.

At the 1933 state election, the Mitchell government was defeated, with Mitchell and the two other Nationalist ministers (John Scaddan and Hubert Parker) losing their seats. (Note: At the time of the 1933 election, the Mitchell ministry had seven members, three from the Nationalist Party and four from the Country Party. All three Nationalist ministers lost their seats, as did John Lindsay of the Country Party. However, two of the Country Party ministers were members of the Legislative Council, and thus not up for re-election at that time.) As he was the only remaining Nationalist in parliament with ministerial experience, a post-election party-room meeting elected Keenan as the new leader. The Nationalists had lost so many seats that they became the junior partners in the coalition with the Country Party, with the Country Party's leader, Charles Latham, serving as Leader of the Opposition. Keenan's party failed to make any improvement at the 1936 election, and he resigned as leader in April 1938 in favour of Ross McDonald. His age (74) and health were factors in his resignation.

Keenan was opposed by Dorothy Tangney, a future Labor senator, at the 1936 and 1939 elections, but retained his seat easily on both occasions. At the 1943 and 1947 elections, he did likewise, facing only independents as opponents. He had affiliated with the new Liberal Party upon its creation in 1945. Aged 86 at the time of the 1950 election, Keenan was opposed in Nedlands by three other candidates. He and one other candidate were endorsed by the Liberal Party, while the two others ran as unendorsed Liberals. Keenan polled only 23.3 percent of the first-preference vote, which was not enough to make the final two-candidate-preferred count, and the eventual victor was David Grayden, a 25-year-old leader of the party's youth wing.

== Personal life ==
Keenan died in Perth in April 1954, aged 90. He had married Rose Elizabeth Parker in 1900, with whom he had two children. Her father was Sir Stephen Henry Parker, who was Chief Justice of Western Australia from 1906 to 1914, and her uncle was George Leake, who was Premier of Western Australia on two occasions. One of Keenan's brothers-in-law was Thomas Percy Draper (attorney-general from 1919 to 1921), who married his wife's sister. Keenan was a Catholic.

== Notes ==
Parliament of Western Australia
Preceded by William Johnson	Member for Kalgoorlie; 1905–1911	Succeeded by Albert Green
New seat	Member for Nedlands; 1930–1950	Succeeded by David Grayden
Political offices
Preceded by Hector Rason	Attorney-General; 1906–1909	Succeeded by Newton Moore
Preceded by John Drew	Chief Secretary; 1930–1931	Succeeded by Charles Baxter
Preceded by John Drew	Minister for Education; 1930–1931	Succeeded by Thomas Davy
