= Richard Court =

Australian politician and diplomat (born 1947)

The Honourable Richard Court AC
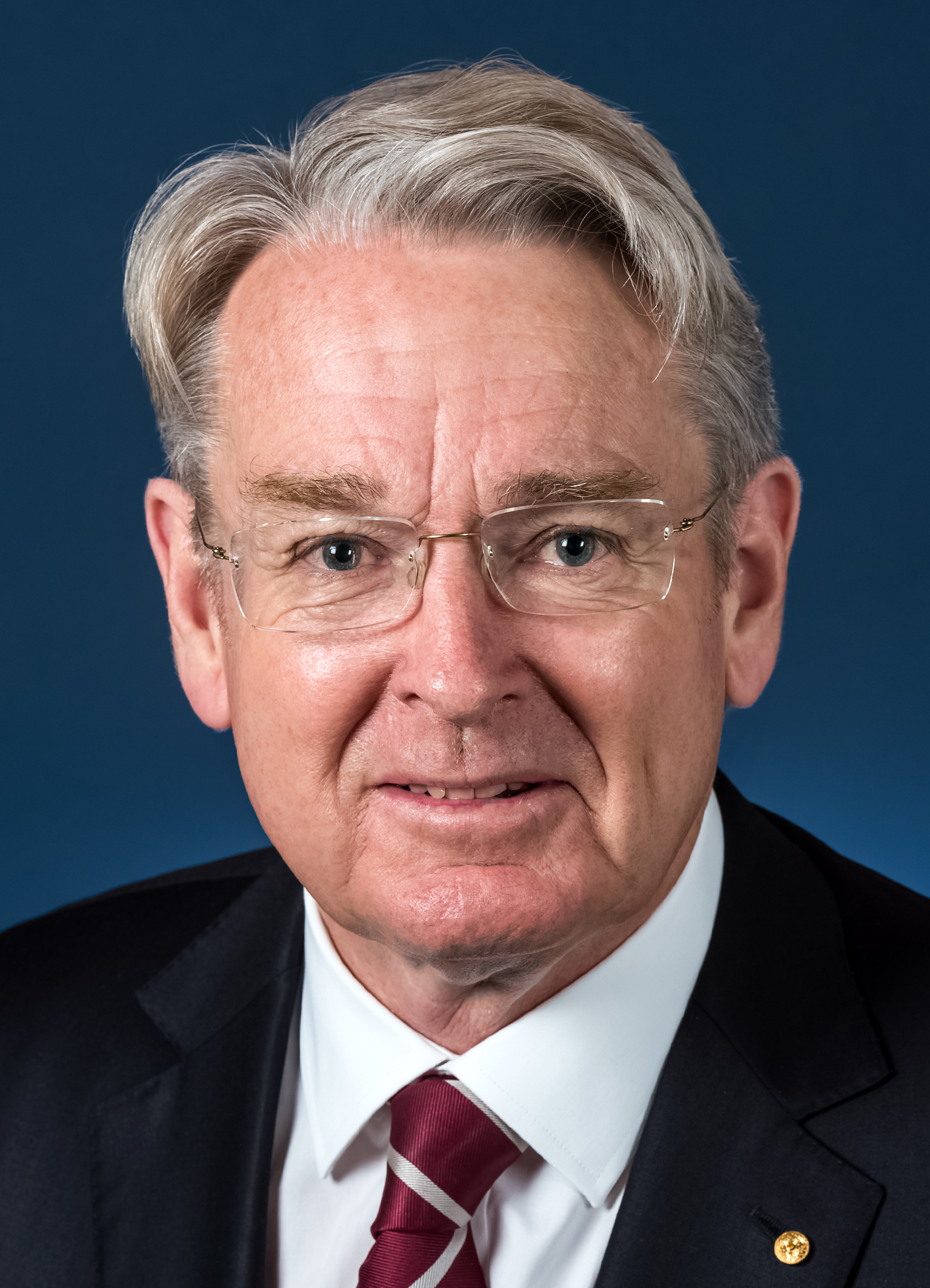

Australian Ambassador to Japan
- In office 11 April 2017 – 2020
- Preceded by: Bruce Miller
- Succeeded by: Jan Adams

26th Premier of Western Australia
- In office 16 February 1993 – 10 February 2001
- Monarch: Elizabeth II
- Governor: Sir Francis Burt; Michael Jeffery; John Sanderson
- Deputy: Hendy Cowan
- Preceded by: Carmen Lawrence
- Succeeded by: Geoff Gallop

Leader of the Opposition in Western Australia
- In office 12 May 1992 – 16 February 1993
- Premier: Carmen Lawrence
- Deputy: Colin Barnett
- Preceded by: Barry MacKinnon
- Succeeded by: Carmen Lawrence

Member of the Western Australian Parliament for Nedlands
- In office 13 March 1982 – 27 April 2001
- Preceded by: Sir Charles Court
- Succeeded by: Sue Walker

Personal details
- Born: Richard Fairfax Court; 27 September 1947 (age 79) Nedlands, Western Australia, Australia
- Party: Liberal Party
- Spouse: Jo Court
- Relations: Sir Charles Court (father)

Richard Fairfax Court AC (born 27 September 1947) is an Australian former politician and diplomat. He served as Premier of Western Australia from 1993 to 2001 and as Australian Ambassador to Japan from 2017 to 2020. A member of the Liberal Party, he represented the Perth-area electorate of Nedlands in the Western Australian Legislative Assembly from 1982 to 2001. His father, Sir Charles Court, also served as state premier.

== Early life ==
Court was born into a political family. His father, Sir Charles Court, was the previous member for Nedlands (1953–1982) and served as Premier from 1974 to 1982. His older brother Barry Court was president of the Pastoralists' and Graziers' Association, married Margaret Court, and became President of the Liberal Party of Western Australia in March 2008.

Richard Court was educated at Hale School and graduated from the University of Western Australia with a Bachelor of Commerce degree in 1968. He subsequently spent a year as a management trainee at Ford Motor Company in the United States, and on his return to Western Australia, operated a number of businesses including food retailing and the manufacture, wholesale and retail of marine and boating equipment.

In April 1970, Court married Helen Margaret Dewar. The couple had two children but divorced in 1977. In January 1989, he married Joanne Frances Moffat (Jo), with whom he has one daughter, born in 1994.

As an 18 Foot Skiff sailor in the mid 1970s, he combined the concepts of trapezing with the sliding plank (as he had used previously when sailing Skates) into a sliding rack. This feature increased righting moment, sail carrying power, and ultimately boat speed. The concept was simplified into fixed wings, rapidly adopted by the rest of the 18 ft skiff fleet, and now ubiquitous in sailing skiffs.

== Political career ==
In March 1982, at a by-election upon the retirement of his father from politics, Court was elected to represent his father's seat of Nedlands, located in Perth's wealthy beachside suburbs, in the state legislature. His time as a government backbencher was short-lived, however, as the opposition Labor Party and its charismatic leader, Brian Burke, won the 1983 state election. Court was elevated to the shadow frontbench in 1984, serving as the opposition spokesman for Resources and Industrial Development, Mines and Aboriginal Affairs. He became deputy leader of the Liberal Party in September 1987, serving under Barry MacKinnon.

By 1992, the Labor government was reeling from the WA Inc scandal. With a state election due the following year, the Liberals should have been unbackable favourites, but MacKinnon was unable to capitalise. With this in mind, Court challenged MacKinnon's leadership and won, ousting MacKinnon by 20 votes to 12.

In February 1993, a state election brought the Liberal Party and their coalition partner, the Nationals, to power with a stable majority following revelations from the WA Inc royal commission examining deals made with businessmen such as Alan Bond and Laurie Connell by Labor governments during the 1980s.

The Court government was comfortably re-elected in the 1996 WA State election. The Liberals actually won a majority in their own right (29 seats out of 57) for the first time ever, but Court opted to retain the coalition with the Nationals. However, Court's popularity suffered in his second term as Premier due to scandals, including deals made between the government and the Premier's brother, Ken Court, as well as the finance broking scandal, where many elderly investors lost their savings and an inquiry found the Government ineffective and inefficient in managing the industry. Also important was the continued logging of old growth forests in the South West of Western Australia. A rejuvenated Labor Party, led since 1996 by Dr Geoff Gallop, won the state election on 10 February 2001 on a 13-seat, 7-point swing—a shift in voter sympathies not seen since the 1911 state election.

=== Departure from politics ===
On 14 February 2001, a few days after losing the election, Court refused to resign and endorse his long-serving deputy leader and factional rival Colin Barnett as Leader of the Opposition—defying media predictions by announcing he would stay for up to eight years. Court was from the conservative wing of the WA Liberals, while Barnett was from the moderate wing. He said he intended to continue in the role as other well-known contenders for party leadership had lost their seats at the election. Political commentator Matt Price described the decision to stay on as "insanity", although allowed for the possibility Court's main reason for staying on was to thwart the plans of his "barely tolerated deputy" by buying time for another contender. Initially, Barnett did not nominate for any position ahead of 21 February party room ballot, but on 19 February, announced he would stand against Court for the leadership, saying that party renewal was necessary.

On the morning of the ballot, Liberal MPs and the public learned of a reported "backroom deal" brokered by Western Australian party president David Johnston to install federal MP Julie Bishop as state Liberal leader. Under this plan, Barnett and Court would both resign their seats. Barnett would have been offered Bishop's seat of Curtin, the safest federal seat in the Perth area. Bishop would contest the resulting by-election in either Nedlands or Barnett's seat of Cottesloe (both of which were within Curtin's boundaries, and are reckoned as comfortably safe Liberal seats). Court would hand over the party leadership to Bishop once she was safely in state parliament. The plan was announced on the front page of The West Australian in a story by editor Brian Rogers, which reported that Barnett had been "sounded out about the plan". However, Barnett stated he "choked on his Weet-Bix" as he read details of the plan in the newspaper, describing it as "an act of treachery". Many other Liberal MPs had also not heard of the plan before the story. Despite this, Court won the ballot 17–13 against Barnett during a four-hour party-room meeting, with Dan Sullivan being elected as his deputy. By 23 February, the plan had to be scrapped when Bishop, who had never formally committed to the plan, rejected it. Court was now in an untenable position, and was forced to retire from politics the next day, with Barnett taking the leadership in the ensuing party room ballot in which he defeated Rod Sweetman. Court had disputes with the Keating Government over Mabo.

== Post-political life ==
On 9 June 2003, Richard Court was appointed a Companion of the Order of Australia (AC). The award cited "[his] service to the Western Australian Parliament and to the community, particularly the Indigenous community, and in the areas of child health research and cultural heritage and to economic development through negotiating major resource projects including the export of gas to China furthering the interests of the nation as a whole."

In November 2016, Minister for Foreign Affairs Julie Bishop announced that Court would be appointed as Australian Ambassador to Japan in "early 2017". On 11 April 2017, he presented credentials to Emperor Akihito at Imperial Palace in Tokyo. In October 2020 it was announced that Jan Adams would replace Court as Ambassador to Japan.

== See also ==
- Court–Cowan Ministry

Political offices
Preceded by Barry MacKinnon	Opposition Leader; 1992–1993	Succeeded by Dr Carmen Lawrence
Preceded by Dr Carmen Lawrence	Premier of Western Australia; 1993–2001	Succeeded by Dr Geoff Gallop
Preceded by Colin Barnett	Minister for Tourism; 1994–1995	Succeeded by Norman Moore
Preceded by Dr Geoff Gallop	Opposition Leader; 2001	Succeeded by Colin Barnett
Party political offices
Preceded by Barry MacKinnon	Leader of the Liberal Party in Western Australia; 1992–2001	Succeeded by Colin Barnett
Diplomatic posts
Preceded by Bruce Miller	Australian Ambassador to Japan; 2017–2020	Succeeded by Jan Adams
