= 2020 Western Australian Liberal Party leadership election =

- 24 November 2020
- Leadership election
Nominee	Zak Kirkup
Caucus vote	Unopposed
Percentage	100%
Seat	Dawesville
Leader before election
Liza Harvey
Elected Leader
Zak Kirkup
- Deputy leadership election
Nominee	Libby Mettam
Caucus vote	Unopposed
Percentage	100%
Seat	Vasse
Deputy Leader before election
Bill Marmion
Elected Deputy Leader
Libby Mettam

The Western Australian Division of the Liberal Party of Australia held a leadership vote on 24 November 2020 to determine its leader. The election was conducted among Liberal Party members of the Parliament of Western Australia. It came after its previous leader, Liza Harvey, resigned following poor opinion polling. Deputy leader Bill Marmion also resigned on the same day. The main candidates touted ahead of the election were Dean Nalder, a member of parliament since 2013 and a minister in the Barnett Ministry, and Zak Kirkup, a member of parliament since 2017. Nalder declined to nominate for the leadership after it became clear he did not have the full support of the Liberal Party caucus. As a result, Kirkup won the leadership unopposed, becoming the state's leader of the opposition. Libby Mettam was elected unopposed as the deputy leader.

== Background ==
The Liberal Party, led by Colin Barnett, lost the 2017 Western Australian state election in a landslide victory by Labor. From Barnett's resignation on 21 March 2017 to the 2020 leadership vote, the party has had two leaders: Mike Nahan, who resigned in June 2019, and Liza Harvey.

In May 2020, during the COVID-19 pandemic, Harvey called for Premier Mark McGowan to relax Western Australia's border restrictions with the rest of the country. At that point, Western Australia was almost virus free with only a few restrictions in place, one of which was the strict border controls. She proposed that Western Australia first open up to South Australia and the Northern Territory, which McGowan said would be unconstitutional as it would be discriminating between states/territories. Harvey's comments were heavily criticised, and a poll published by The West Australian showed that nine in ten Western Australians supported the government border.

On 11 June, The West Australian published an opinion poll by Painted Dog Research which gave Harvey's approval rating as 19% and disapproval rating as 37%, compared to Premier McGowan's approval rating of 87%. On 8 September, The West Australian published an opinion poll by Painted Dog Research which gave Harvey's approval rating at 10%, behind Premier McGowan's approval rating of 91%. Utting Research released an opinion poll on 1 October which gave Harvey's previously safe seat of Scarborough a two-party-preferred vote of 66–34 in favour of the Labor Party.

== Leadership vote ==
On 22 November 2020, Harvey announced her resignation as leader of the Liberal Party and leader of the opposition. Dean Nalder and Zak Kirkup both stated their intention to nominate for the party's leadership. David Honey stated he would not nominate himself. Deputy leader Bill Marmion also resigned that day. A special partyroom meeting was called for 24 November for the voting to happen.

Nalder was a 54-year old MP who had been in the Legislative Assembly since 2013, first for the seat of Alfred Cove and later for the seat of Bateman. He had been the minister for transport, minister for finance and minister for agriculture and food in the Barnett Government. Kirkup was a 33-year MP who had been in the Legislative Assembly since 2017, representing the marginal seat of Dawesville, which he won in 2017 by a margin of 0.9%.

Ahead of the vote, Kirkup was favoured as he had the support of key powerbrokers Peter Collier and Nick Goiran, who helped him gain at least 12 votes. Nalder held support from the business community. The West Australian newspaper reported on 24 November that Kirkup had the support of Harvey, Marmion, Collier, Steve Thomas, Libby Mettam, Goiran, Peter Katsambanis, Jim Chown, Tony Krsticevic, Tjorn Sibma and Michael Mischin; Nalder had the support of Kyran O'Donnell, John McGrath, Sean L'Estrange, Simon O'Brien, Nahan, Honey and Ken Baston; and Alyssa Hayden and Donna Faragher were undecided.

At 9:00 am on 24 November, Nalder withdrew his nomination after it became apparent that he would not win. Kirkup won the leadership later that day unopposed. Mettam won the deputy leadership unopposed as well. At 33 years of age, Kirkup became the youngest person to lead the Liberal Party in Western Australia, and the second youngest person to ever be the leader of the opposition in Western Australia.

== Aftermath ==
On 1 December 2020, Nalder announced he would retire and not contest the 2021 state election. In his statement, he criticised the factional forces within the Liberal Party, who backed Kirkup over himself. He said that he could never become leader in the future as he did not have the backing of Collier and Goiran. Days later, he quit his shadow cabinet roles, including shadow treasurer. It was revealed in August 2021 that Collier and Goiran were using a group called "The Clan" to influence the election.

At the 2021 state election on 13 March, the Liberal Party was left with just two seats in the Legislative Assembly. Kirkup's seat of Dawesville, Nalder's seat of Bateman, and Harvey's seat of Scarborough were won by the Labor Party. A leadership vote occurred after that election to determine who should succeed Kirkup as leader, which Honey won.
