= 2023 Western Australian Liberal Party leadership spill =

- 30 January 2023
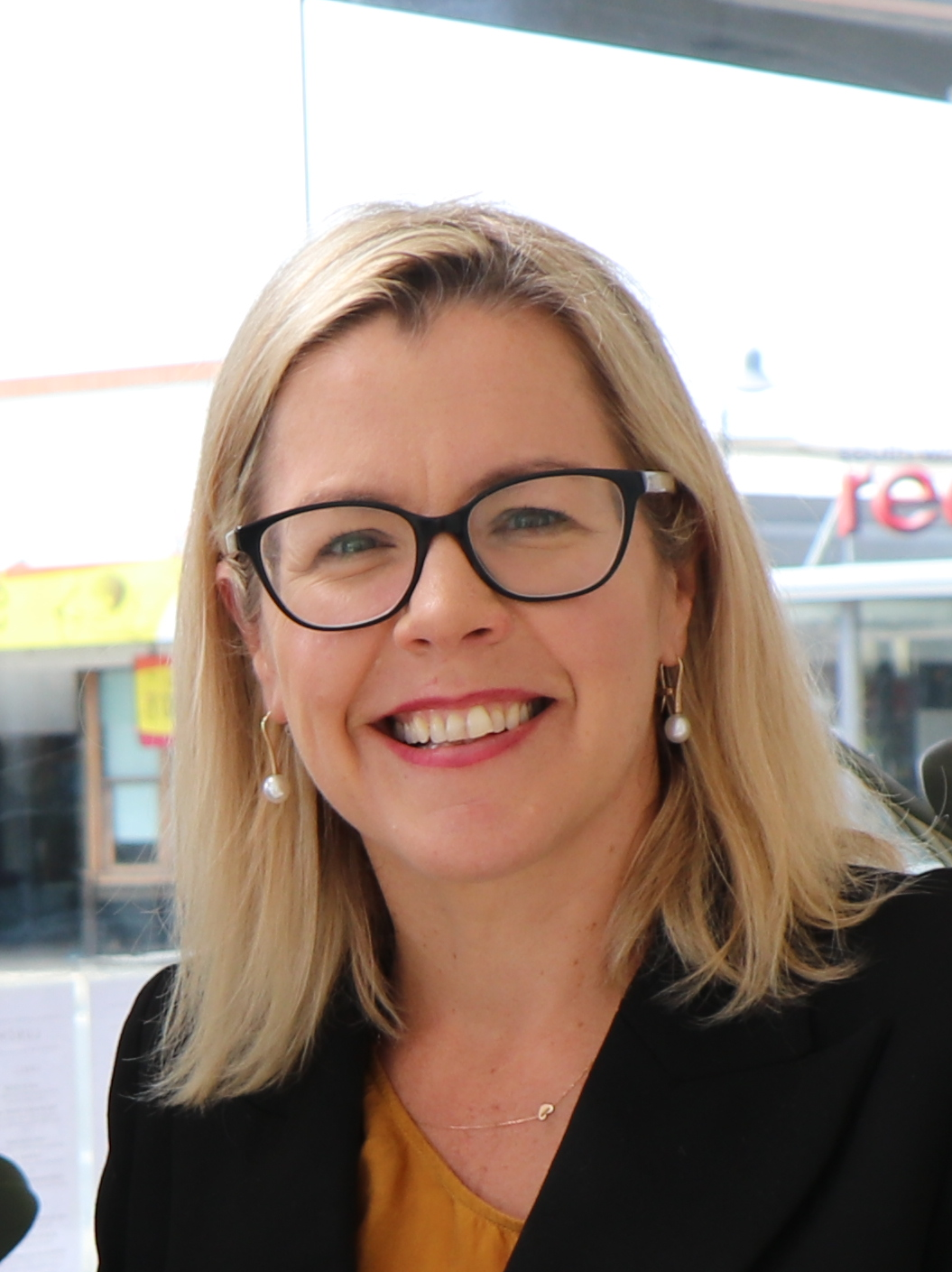
Nominee	Libby Mettam
Caucus vote	Unopposed
Percentage	100%
Seat	Vasse
Leader before election
David Honey
Elected Leader
Libby Mettam

The Western Australian Division of the Liberal Party of Australia had a leadership spill on 30 January 2023. Libby Mettam defeated David Honey to become the leader of the Liberal Party in Western Australia.

== Background ==
The March 2021 Western Australian state election saw the Liberal Party win just two seats in the lower house and seven seats in the upper house, a record loss. In the aftermath of the election, David Honey was elected leader of the party and Libby Mettam, the only other lower house Liberal member, was elected deputy leader. As the Liberal Party had fewer lower house seats than the National Party, Honey did not become the leader of the opposition, but the two parties did form an alliance, whereby Liberal MPs would be part of the shadow cabinet.

Over the two years following the 2021 election, it became viewed as increasingly likely that Honey would be replaced as leader by Mettam. According to an anonymous Liberal MP, the party had been discussing making Mettam the leader for the entire duration of Honey's leadership. An opinion poll by Painted Dog Research and published in The West Australian in October 2022 showed that nine percent of respondents were satisfied with Honey's performance, 31 percent were dissatisfied, and 60 percent did not know. Another poll by Painted Dog Research done on 5 January 2023 showed that ten percent of respondents believed that Honey was the right person to lead the Liberal Party, 29 percent of respondents believed that Mettam was the right person to lead the party, and 55 percent of respondents did not know. Mettam had gained a higher profile than Honey through her position as shadow minister for health, in which she was outspoken on weaknesses in the state's health system.

== Leadership spill ==
On Friday, 27 January 2023, Mettam revealed her intention to challenge Honey for the leadership at a special partyroom meeting the following week. The move came the same day that Nationals leader Mia Davies announced her resignation from the position. The meeting occurred on 30 January. Honey initially said that he would contest the leadership spill, but pulled out on the morning of the partyroom meeting, allowing Mettam to be voted in unopposed. Upper house MP Steve Thomas was elected deputy Liberal leader.

According to ABC News and The West Australian, Honey was supported only by Nick Goiran and Neil Thomson, with Peter Collier, Donna Faragher, Steve Martin, Tjorn Sibma, and Thomas supporting Mettam, although Sibma and Thomas were the only people to publicly declare where their support lay.

== Aftermath ==
Upon being voted in as leader, Mettam said she would "draw a line in the sand" against the Clan, a controversial group of powerbrokers within the party including Peter Collier and Goiran. She removed Goiran from the shadow cabinet soon after becoming leader, but allowed Collier to stay as he had apologised for language used in the Clan. She also tried to removed Goiran as the Liberal Party parliamentary secretary but a majority of Liberal MPs voted against that motion. Three days later, Goiran resigned as the parliamentary secretary.

Although some thought that Honey would resign from parliament if defeated in a leadership spill, he said that he would continue on in parliament.

The first opinion poll following the leadership spill, a Painted Dog Research poll done in March 2023, showed that Mettam's approval rating was 24 percent and disapproval at 18 percent.
