= Nick Goiran =

Australian politician

The Honourable Nick Goiran MLC
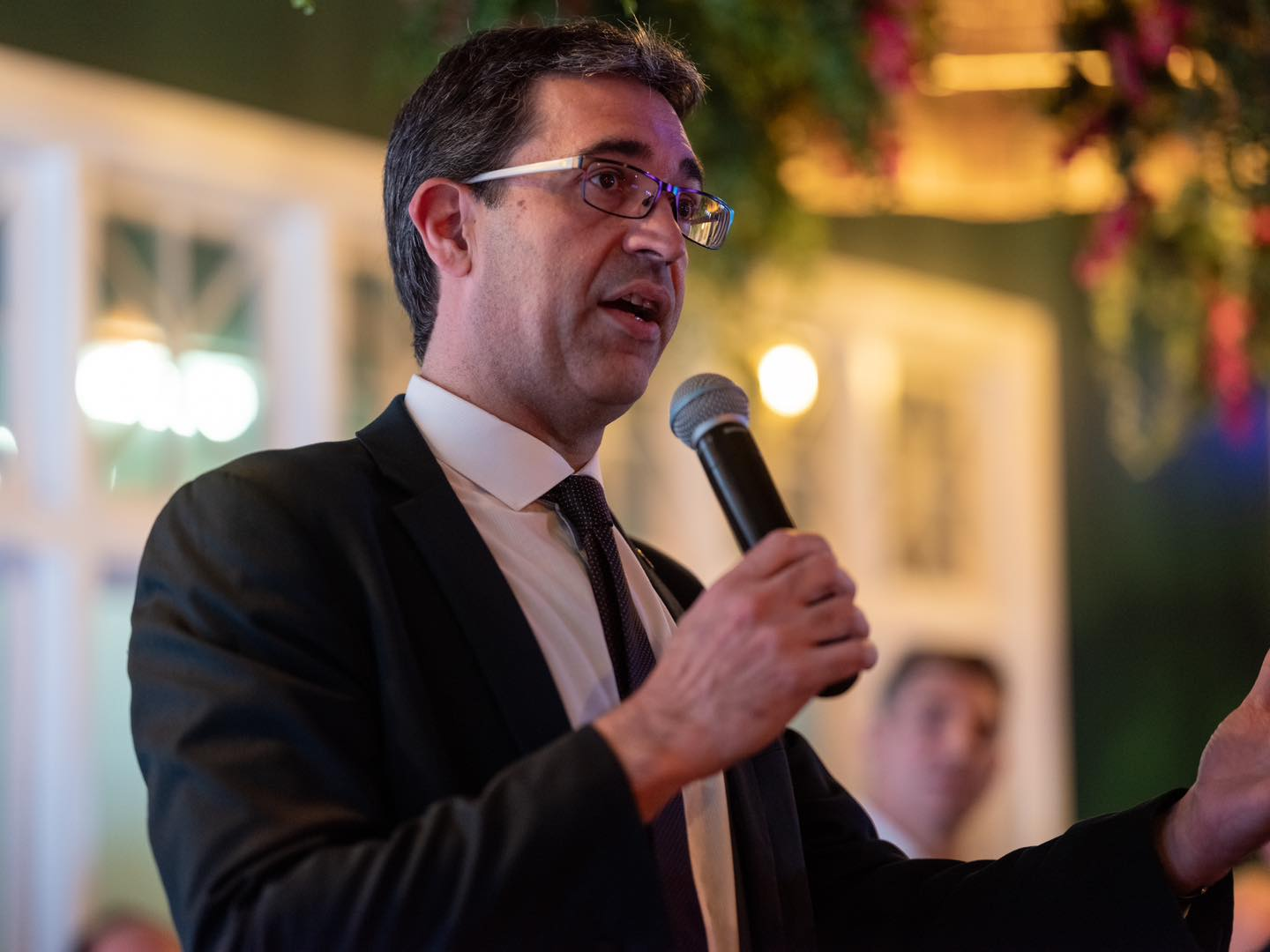
- Goiran in 2024

Leader of the Opposition in the Legislative Council
- Incumbent
- Assumed office 22 May 2025
- Preceded by: Peter Collier

Member of the Western Australian Legislative Council
- Incumbent
- Assumed office 22 May 2025
- Constituency: State-wide
- In office 22 May 2009 – 21 May 2025
- Constituency: South Metropolitan Region

Personal details
- Born: Nicolas Pierre Goiran; 15 October 1977 (age 48) Sydney, New South Wales, Australia
- Party: Liberal (c. 2006–present)
- Other political affiliations: Christian Democratic Party (before 2006)
- Spouse: Jody
- Education: Murdoch University
- Occupation: Lawyer
- Website: www.nickgoiran.com.au

Nicolas Pierre Goiran (born 15 October 1977) is an Australian politician who has been a member of the Western Australian Legislative Council (MLC), the upper house of the Parliament of Western Australia, since 22 May 2009. A member of the Liberal Party, Goiran has been the leader of the opposition in the Legislative Council since May 2025.

Goiran is a conservative Christian. He is pro-life, and opposes same-sex marriage, euthanasia and surrogacy. He has been outspoken on the issue of elder abuse and has opposed COVID-19 vaccine mandates. Goiran has twice been accused of filibustering: he spoke for over 22 hours in total on a surrogacy bill in 2019, delaying it; and he proposed 357 amendments to a voluntary assisted dying bill and spoke on every clause of the bill.

Goiran, alongside fellow MLC Peter Collier, is a Liberal Party power broker. After the March 2021 election, ABC News said that it was unrealistic to achieve preselection in the Perth metropolitan area for the Liberal Party without the support of Goiran or Collier. In August 2021, it was revealed that Goiran was part of a WhatsApp group called "The Clan", whose purpose was to discuss branch stacking and the preselection of candidates. Following the reveal of that group, Goiran was removed from the shadow cabinet. He was readmitted to the shadow cabinet in December 2024, and was elected by his party to be leader of the opposition in the Legislative Council in May 2025.

== Early life and career ==
Nicolas Pierre Goiran was born on 15 October 1977 in Sydney, New South Wales, Australia. He is the son of French immigrants Gerard and Madeleine Goiran; his father worked in the finance industry and his mother as a French teacher. His parents were both officeholders and parliamentary candidates for the Christian Democratic Party. Goiran attended Rehoboth Christian Primary School and Rehoboth Christian High School in the southern suburbs of Perth, Western Australia, where he graduated as dux.

Goiran studied at Murdoch University, graduating with a Bachelor of Law and Bachelor of Commerce double degree, majoring in banking and finance. From 1998 to 2009, Goiran worked for several different law firms, and in December 2000, he was admitted to the Supreme Court of Western Australia as a barrister and solicitor. He eventually rose to equity partner at Bruce Havilah & Associates, where he specialised in civil litigation. He was a board member of the Association for Christian Education (the operator of the Rehoboth schools) from October 2001 to March 2007 and from March 2009 onwards, serving as president from April 2005 to March 2007. From November 2005, he was a director of Christian Education National Ltd. From October 2008, he was a board member of the Citizens Advice Bureau.

He met his wife Jody working as a basketball umpire while in law school. They married on 6 January 2001 in Bull Creek. They have five children.

== Political career ==
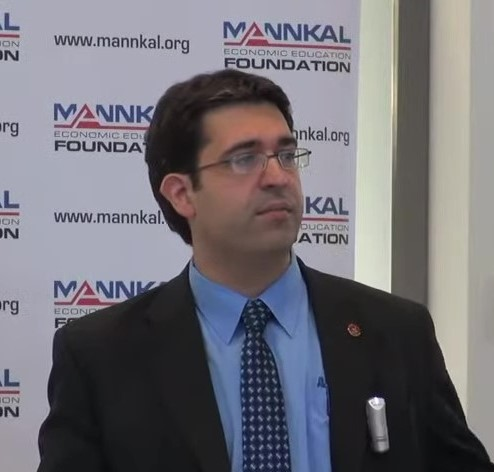
Goiran in 2012

Prior to entering the Parliament of Western Australia, Goiran was a member of the Christian Democratic Party. By 2006, Goiran had joined the Liberal Party with the goal of being elected to parliament. He unsuccessfully sought preselection for the safe Labor seat of Peel for the 2007 Peel state by-election. In February 2008, the Liberal Party preselected him as the second candidate on their ticket for the South Metropolitan Region of the Western Australian Legislative Council, the parliament's upper house, replacing the retiring Barbara Scott. At the 2008 state election, he was elected as a member of the Legislative Council (MLC), with his term commencing on 22 May 2009. In February 2016, Goiran replaced Simon O'Brien as the top candidate on the Liberal's South Metropolitan Region ticket for the 2017 election.

On 23 September 2016, Goiran became the first parliamentary secretary to the minister for mental health and minister for child protection. From March 2017 to February 2023, he was the secretary of the parliamentary Liberal Party. In March 2017 he obtained three roles: the secretary of the parliamentary Liberal Party, shadow minister for child protection, and shadow minister for the prevention of family and domestic violence. From February 2020, Goiran was also the shadow minister for commerce. From April 2021 to February 2023, Goiran was the shadow attorney general, shadow minister for child protection, and shadow minister for industrial relations.

In 2014 Goiran began to gain power within the Liberal Party by building support within the southern suburbs of Perth. By 2016, he had become a key powerbroker alongside fellow MLC Peter Collier and Senator Mathias Cormann, and he had become the leader of the "evangelical right" of the WA Liberal Party. Following the resignation of Liberal Party leader Liza Harvey on 22 November 2020, Goiran and Collier backed Zak Kirkup over Dean Nalder to replace Harvey as leader. As a result, Kirkup won the resulting leadership vote. Following this, Nalder criticised Goiran and Collier, saying they are not good for the party. After the March 2021 election, ABC News said that it was unrealistic to achieve preselection in the Perth metropolitan area for the Liberal Party without the support of Goiran or Collier.

At the March 2021 election, the Labor Party won a majority in the Legislative Council for the first time ever. In May 2021, before the new Legislative Council was sworn in, Goiran introduced a motion to establish a select committee into the transparency and accountability of government. The committee was to be composed mostly of non-Labor MLCs and have a member of the opposition as its chair. Instead, the government and the opposition reached a compromise: two existing committees were to be chaired by Liberal MLCs and one existing committee was to be composed of mostly non-Labor MLCs.

=== The Clan ===
In August 2021, Goiran was revealed to be part of a WhatsApp group called "The Clan", alongside Collier, Cormann and other Liberal Party members. Leaked messages showed that the group discussed branch stacking and the preselection of candidates. Several Liberal Party branches in the southern suburbs of Perth requested that the party send Goiran to the party's appeals and disciplinary committee, which has the power to censure, suspend or expel any member of the party. The Liberal Reform Coalition, a group formed to improve the public image of the party, called for Goiran and Collier's resignation from the party at the group's inaugural meeting in December 2021.

In an addendum to a Liberal Party report which reviewed the party's 2021 election loss, the members of The Clan were described as exhibiting "odious behaviour". Goiran threatened legal action against the Liberal Party's state director and the authors of the report, with his lawyer saying that allegations in the report were "totally false, without basis and constitute serious defamation of him". Goiran and the Liberal Party reached a non-financial settlement in February 2022, with the party agreeing to withdraw the report. Additionally, in January 2022, an investigation into Goiran was launched by the party’s appeals and disciplinary committee. The investigation ruled in August 2022 that Goiran would not face any disciplinary action regarding his conduct shown in the leaked WhatsApp messages due to a lack of evidence that he broke any of the party's rules or procedures.

Following Libby Mettam's election as Liberal Party leader in a leadership spill in January 2023, Mettam requested that Goiran apologise for messages he wrote in the WhatsApp group. Goiran refused to apologise, resulting in his removal from the shadow cabinet, making him the only member of the opposition not in the shadow cabinet. She also tried to remove Goiran as the Liberal Party parliamentary secretary. A majority of Liberal MPs voted against her motion, but three days later, Goiran resigned from the role. When asked whether she would ever let Goiran back into the shadow cabinet, Mettam said "probably not", but after Neil Thomson resigned from shadow cabinet in November 2024 following his failed motion to make Basil Zempilas the Liberal Party's campaign leader, Mettam let Goiran back into the shadow cabinet due to the party's small number of members in parliament. Since December 2024, Goiran has been the shadow attorney general and the shadow minister for child protection.

Due to electoral reforms, the six regions of the Legislative Council were abolished and replaced by a single state-wide region for the 2025 state election. Goiran was preselected in the second position of the Liberal Party's state-wide Legislative Council ticket, guaranteeing him re-election. At the start of the new Legislative Council term, he was appointed the leader of the opposition in the Legislative Council, succeeding Peter Collier, who retired from politics.

== Political views ==
Goiran identifies as a conservative, saying that human life should be protected "from conception until natural death, and that lifelong marriage between a man and a woman guarantees children their biological birthright of a mother and a father". ABC News and The West Australian have described him as a "vocal conservative Christian". In his maiden speech to parliament, he said that Labor's plans to decriminalise and regulate prostitution (similar to the existing laws in New South Wales, Victoria and the territories) were what prompted him to leave the legal profession and run for parliament. He put forward the "Swedish model", which makes prostitution legal but buying sex and brothel ownership illegal. In August 2013, Goiran spoke out against same-sex marriage in parliament, saying that it could lead to an increase in incest and polygamy. Premier and Liberal Party leader Colin Barnett said that Goiran's comments were inappropriate. In May 2017, Goiran moved a motion for a parliamentary inquiry into elder abuse. He wanted the inquiry to consider whether elder abuse should be made into a specific offense. In 2025, he spoke out against efforts by the Labor Party to raise the age of criminal responsibility from 10 to 12 or 14.

=== Gender ===
In 2019, during a debate on a gender reassignment amendment bill, Goiran said that people considering a sex change should receive "psychological treatment". In March 2023, he voiced his support for Victorian Liberal MP Moira Deeming after she attended the anti-transgender "Let Women Speak" rally, organised by British activist Kellie-Jay Keen-Minshull and attended by neo-Nazis.

=== Abortion ===
WAtoday has described Goiran as "one of the staunchest pro-life campaigners in WA parliament". He has campaigned for parliament to inquire into the deaths of 27 babies born alive after attempted abortions since 1999. In 2017, Goiran tabled in parliament a petition calling for the inquiry signed by 7,243 people. In 2021, Goiran was one of three Legislative Council members that opposed a bill to criminalise protesting within 150 metres (490 ft) of abortion clinics. Goiran opposed a 2023 bill that liberalised Western Australia's abortion laws by removing abortion from the criminal code, removing a requirement for mandatory counselling, removing the need for women to be referred for an abortion by a doctor, and increasing the gestational limit at which additional restrictions apply to abortions from 20 weeks to 23 weeks. In December 2024, Goiran spoke at the National Life Summit, sparking concern within the Liberal Party that it could cause abortion to become a talking point in the 2025 election campaign.

=== Surrogacy ===
In April 2019, Goiran delayed a surrogacy bill by delivering a speech lasting over 22 hours in total over two months, in what was one of the Western Australia Parliament's longest filibuster speeches. On seven different occasions, Goiran spoke for over two hours uninterrupted, and on one occasion, he spoke for five hours straight. The bill was going to allow single men and same-sex couples access to surrogacy. Upon the completion of the speech, the Legislative Council agreed to send the bill to be examined by a parliamentary committee. The Labor Party accused Goiran of wasting time and being undemocratic. The parliamentary committee found that provisions in the bill would discriminate against women due to the existing requirement that women have a medical reason for surrogacy.

=== Euthanasia ===
Goiran has opposed legalising euthanasia or voluntary assisted dying (VAD). He was the only member of the Joint Select Committee on End of Life Choices to oppose recommending for the government to legalise voluntary euthanasia for patients suffering from terminal illnesses, saying that it is "a recipe for elder abuse", and that it would have a negative impact on efforts to prevent suicide. When the bill for voluntary assisted dying (VAD) was in the Legislative Council in 2019, Goiran spoke on every clause of the bill, causing the council's sitting hours to be extended. He proposed 357 amendments to the bill, including that a psychiatric assessment be required for VAD patients. Supporters of the bill said that Goiran was attempting to delay voting on it. Premier Mark McGowan said that Goiran's behaviour was "disgraceful" and "worse than filibustering", but Goiran denied that he was trying to filibuster. In the end, the bill had 55 amendments, 25 of which were Goiran's. After the bill was passed in December 2019, Goiran called it the "most dangerous piece of euthanasia legislation in Australian history".

=== COVID-19 ===
Goiran has attracted criticism for being one of only two members of the Parliament of Western Australia that refuses to reveal their COVID-19 vaccination status, alongside Legalise Cannabis WA MLC Sophia Moermond. In October 2021, he criticised and questioned the lawfulness of the Western Australian Government's requirement that certain occupations get vaccinated against COVID-19. In parliament, he has said that "I support vaccinations. I also support the right of individuals to medical privacy". When Parliament passed a motion that MPs must have three doses of COVID-19 vaccines or provide a valid exemption to be in the chamber, Goiran did not exit, showing that he has met those conditions.
