= The Clan (Liberal Party of Australia) =

Faction of the Western Australian Liberal Party

The Clan was a WhatsApp chat group involving members of the Western Australian division of the Liberal Party, which was active between 2016 and 2021 and was used to coordinate activities within the Liberal Party. The group was revealed in 2021 after its contents were leaked to the media. Prominent members included former Western Australian senator Mathias Cormann and Legislative Council members Peter Collier and Nick Goiran.

== Members ==
Members in the chat group included:

- Senator Mathias Cormann
- Legislative Council member Peter Collier
- Legislative Council member Nick Goiran
- House of Representatives member Ian Goodenough
- Senator Slade Brockman
- Legislative Assembly member Tony Krsticevic
- Liberal Party State Treasurer Aiden Depiazzi
- Liberal Party State President Fay Duda

== WhatsApp messages leak ==
The chat was revealed with a leak of 700 pages of messages in August 2021. Amongst these pages, some members of the chat group discussed or joked about branch stacking. The leaked messages show that the group was primarily used to coordinate voting at internal party meetings within the organisational wing of the WA Liberal Party.

== Influence ==
Australia's longest-serving Finance Minister, Mathias Cormann, was a member of the chat group. Liberal Party State President Fay Duda was also in the group.

Ahead of the 2017 state election, Goiran's preferred candidate for the re-drawn seat of Bateman, backbench MP Matt Taylor, lost the preselection to then-minister Dean Nalder in a 69 to 50 vote of State Council. Nalder then went on to launch an unsuccessful leadership challenge against then-Premier and leader of the Liberal Party, Colin Barnett.

Brockman received support from members of the group when he stood for preselection to the Senate in 2017.

During preselection for the 2018 Cottesloe state by-election, Collier, a member of the WhatsApp group, unsuccessfully backed BHP lawyer Emma Roberts over David Honey, who eventually won preselection.

The 2020 Western Australian Liberal Party leadership election was influenced by two of the chat group's members, Collier and Goiran, who backed Zak Kirkup over Dean Nalder. In a statement made by Nalder upon his retirement announcement a week later, he criticised the factional forces within the Liberal Party, who backed Kirkup over himself. He said that he could never become leader in the future as he could not secure the majority support of the party room without Collier and Goiran. Days later, he quit his shadow cabinet roles, including shadow treasurer.

== Fallout ==
Duda initially maintained that she would renominate for her fourth year as president, due to begin in October 2021, but announced on 27 August that she would not renominate.

The Liberal Reform Coalition, a group formed after the leak of the WhatsApp messages by longstanding factional enemies of Collier and Goiran such as Norman Moore, called for their resignation from the party at their inaugural meeting in December 2021.

Several Liberal Party branches in the southern suburbs of Perth requested that the party send Goiran to the party's appeals and disciplinary committee, which has the power to censure, suspend or expel any member of the party. In January 2022, an investigation into Goiran was launched by the committee. On 31 August 2022, media reports indicated that Goiran had been cleared of the charges due to a lack of evidence he had breached any party rules or procedures.

An addendum to a Liberal Party report into the 2021 election loss, written by two party members, Danielle Blain and Mark Trowell, described some members of the chat group as exhibiting "odious behaviour". Goiran threatened legal action against the Liberal Party's state director and the authors of the report, with his lawyer saying that allegations in the report were "totally false, without basis and constitute serious defamation of him". Goiran and the Liberal Party reached a non-financial settlement in February 2022, with the party agreeing to withdraw the addendum.

Following Libby Mettam's election as Liberal Party leader in a leadership spill in January 2023, Collier issued an apology for the "inappropriate" language he used in the WhatsApp group. Mettam soon removed Goiran from the shadow cabinet, making him the only member of the opposition not in the shadow cabinet. According to WAtoday, Goiran would have likely not been removed from shadow cabinet if he had apologised like Collier did. Mettam also tried to removed Goiran as the Liberal Party parliamentary secretary but a majority of Liberal MPs voted against that motion. Three days later, Goiran resigned as the parliamentary secretary.

== See also ==
- National Right (Liberal Party of Australia)
