= 1990 Cottesloe state by-election =

The 1990 Cottesloe state by-election was a by-election for the seat of Cottesloe in the Legislative Assembly of Western Australia held on 11 August 1990. It was triggered by the resignation of Bill Hassell (the sitting Liberal member and former leader of the opposition) on 28 June 1990. The Liberal Party retained Cottesloe at the election with an increased majority, with Colin Barnett (an economist) securing 70.26 percent of the two-party-preferred vote. The Labor Party did not field a candidate.

== Background ==
Bill Hassell had held Cottesloe for the Liberal Party since the 1977 state election. He replaced Ray O'Connor as leader of the Liberal Party (and thus as leader of the opposition) in February 1984, but was replaced as leader by Barry MacKinnon in November 1986, having lost the 1986 election earlier in the year. He remained in the shadow ministry until shortly before his resignation from parliament, which occurred on 28 June 1990. The writ for the by-election was issued on 10 July, with the close of nominations on 18 July. Polling day was on 11 August, with the writ returned on 22 August.

== Results ==
Cottesloe state by-election, 1990
Party	Candidate	Votes	%	±%
Liberal	Colin Barnett	7,708	52.5	–6.9
Greens	Mary Salter	2,031	13.8	+13.8
Independent	Ross Hutchinson	1,884	12.8	+12.8
	Peter Weygers	1,747	11.9	+11.9
Democrats	Richard Jeffreys	777	5.3	–1.9
Grey Power	Douglas Ratcliffe	278	1.9	–5.0
Independent	William Hunt	204	1.4	+1.4
	Tony Bozich	63	0.4	+0.4
Total formal votes		14,692	96.7	+1.8
Informal votes		493	3.3	–1.8
Turnout		15,185	69.6	–19.2
Two-candidate-preferred result
Liberal	Colin Barnett	10,323	70.3	+3.5
Greens	Mary Salter	4,369	29.7	+29.7
Liberal hold		Swing	N/A	

- Note: the Ross Hutchinson who stood as an independent at this by-election is a different person to Sir Ross Hutchinson, who held Cottesloe as a Liberal from 1950 to 1977.

== Aftermath ==
Barnett has retained Cottesloe at every state election since 1990. He was a minister in the government of Richard Court, and was deputy leader from 1993 to 2001. He led the party from 2001 to 2005 without electoral success, but was re-elected leader prior to the 2008 state election and subsequently became premier, a position which he held until 2017.

== See also ==
- List of Western Australian state by-elections
