= Libby Mettam =

Australian politician (born 1977)

Libby Mettam MLA
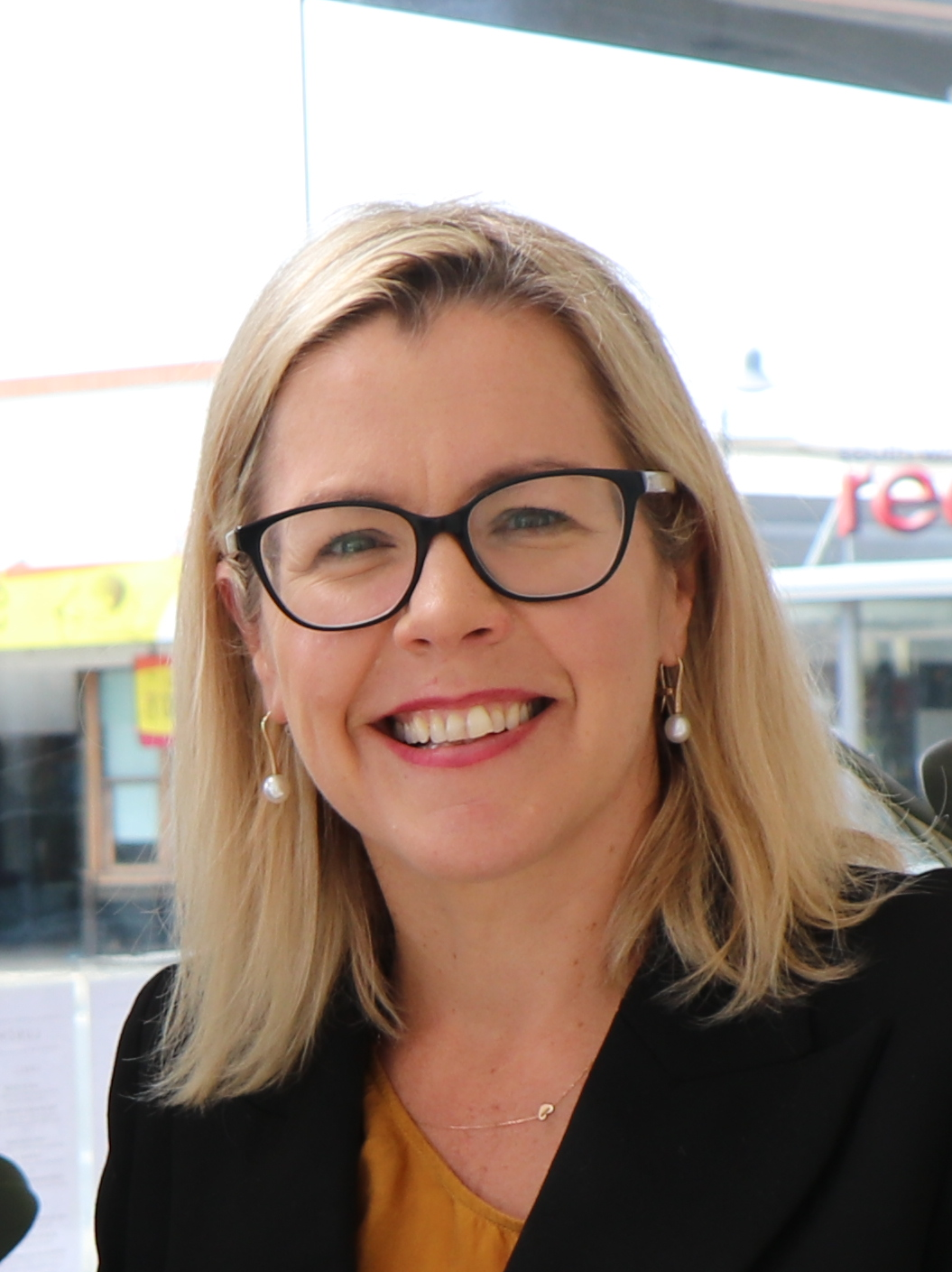
- Mettam in 2021

17th Leader of the Western Australian Liberal Party
- In office 30 January 2023 – 25 March 2025
- Deputy: Steve Thomas; Steve Martin
- Preceded by: David Honey
- Succeeded by: Basil Zempilas

Manager of Opposition Business in the Legislative Assembly
- Incumbent
- Assumed office 25 March 2025
- Preceded by: Peter Rundle

Deputy Leader of the Opposition
- Incumbent
- Assumed office 25 March 2025
- Leader: Basil Zempilas
- Preceded by: Peter Rundle
- In office 24 November 2020 – 13 March 2021
- Leader: Zak Kirkup
- Preceded by: Bill Marmion
- Succeeded by: Shane Love

Member of the Western Australian Legislative Assembly for Vasse
- Incumbent
- Assumed office 18 October 2014
- Preceded by: Troy Buswell
Party leadership positions
Deputy Leader of the Western Australian Liberal Party
Incumbent
Assumed office 25 March 2025
Leader	Basil Zempilas
Preceded by	Steve Martin
In office 24 November 2020 – 30 January 2023
Leader	Zak Kirkup; David Honey
Preceded by	Bill Marmion
Succeeded by	Steve Thomas
Government Whip
In office 23 September 2016 – 11 March 2017
Premier	Colin Barnett
Preceded by	Rob Johnson
Succeeded by	Margaret Quirk

Personal details
- Born: Elizabeth Hansen-Knarhoi; 3 May 1977 (age 49) Subiaco, Western Australia
- Party: Liberal
- Spouse: Jonathan Mettam (m. 2000)
- Children: 2
- Education: Western Australian Academy of Performing Arts (BA); Curtin Business School (MPA)
- Profession: Journalist, electorate officer, politician
- Website: libbymettam.com.au

Elizabeth Mettam (née Hansen-Knarhoi, 3 May 1977) is an Australian politician. She has been the member for Vasse in the Western Australian Legislative Assembly since 18 October 2014 and the deputy leader of the Western Australian Liberal Party since 25 March 2025, after previously holding the position from November 2020 to January 2023. She was the leader of the Western Australian Liberal Party from January 2023 to March 2025.

Mettam grew up in Kalgoorlie and Geraldton, moving to Perth to study broadcasting at the Western Australian Academy of Performing Arts. She then worked as a news producer between 1999 and 2005 for Channel 7, Channel 9 and the ABC and as an electorate officer for Liberal MP Barry House from 2005 to 2014, having moved to the town of Dunsborough in 2003. She was elected to Parliament in a 2014 by-election resulting from the resignation of Troy Buswell.

Following the Liberal Party's 2017 election loss, Mettam was elevated to the shadow cabinet, and following the resignation of Liza Harvey as Liberal leader in November 2020, Mettam became the party's deputy leader to Zak Kirkup. Following the party's landslide defeat in the 2021 state election, Mettam was one of just two remaining Liberal MPs. In January 2023, she became party leader following a leadership spill, defeating David Honey. Mettam lead her party into the 2025 Western Australian state election which had a poor result for the Liberals. She was re-elected in the election in her own constituency. Following the election, she resigned as party leader and was replaced by Basil Zempilas. She subsequently stepped down to the role of deputy leader.

== Early life ==
Elizabeth Hansen-Knarhoi was born on 3 May 1977 in Subiaco, Western Australia, to Jennifer, a real estate agent, and Peter Hansen-Knarhoi, a biochemist. Her paternal grandparents were from the United Kingdom, and met on a steamship en route from London to Perth, where her father was born. Mettam's mother and her family arrived in Western Australia from England in 1951. Mettam grew up in Kalgoorlie briefly and Geraldton for most her childhood, having to move due to her father's work as a biochemist. She attended Bluff Point Primary School from 1982 to 1989 and Geraldton Senior High School from 1990 to 1994.

Aged 17, Mettam moved to Perth to study at Edith Cowan University's Western Australian Academy of Performing Arts, majoring in broadcasting. She later said "that is something that has lingered with me. I don’t think it’s fair the only option for regional children is to go to the city to further their education." She met her future husband, Jonathan Charles Mettam, while working with him at the Albion Hotel in Cottesloe. She paused her degree to spend a year in Melbourne with him, and they soon had two daughters together. They married on 26 August 2000 and spent a year in Adelaide so that Jonathan could complete a qualification in winemaking, before moving to Dunsborough, Western Australia, in 2003. Mettam later studied at Curtin Business School, earning a masters in Public Administration. In 2007, she was awarded Best student in public administration by the state division of the Institute of Public Administration.

Prior to entering politics, Mettam worked as a news producer, which was her first exposure to politics. From 1999 to 2001, she was a researcher for Channel 7 Perth's Today Tonight; in 2001 and 2002, she was a bureau producer for Channel 9's A Current Affair in Adelaide; and from 2003 to 2005, she was a producer for ABC South West, which put her in contact with her local member of the state parliament, Troy Buswell, which led to her getting a job working as an electorate officer for Liberal MLC Barry House from 2005 to 2014. She was also a freelance journalist for Instyle Publishing from 2007 to 2010, and a seasonal publicist for CinefestOZ from 2008.

Organisations that Mettam has been a member of include the Dunsborough Yallingup Chamber of Commerce and Industry, of which she was vice president for a time; the Busselton Chamber of Commerce; the Our Lady of the Cape Primary School board, and the MacKillop Catholic College Interim School Board.

== Early political career ==
Mettam joined the Dunsborough branch of the Western Australian Liberal Party in 2006, becoming branch secretary from 2012 to 2014 and branch president in 2014. Her parents had been Liberal supporters, but were not members of the party, and Mettam herself was not interested in politics during her early 20s. She was also a committee member of the party's campaign for the electoral district of Warren-Blackwood for the 2013 state election and the secretary of the Forrest Division Women in 2014.

Troy Buswell, the Liberal member for the electoral district of Vasse in the Western Australian Legislative Assembly, resigned from his seat on 3 September 2014 due to mental health problems. Mettam soon emerged as the leading contender to be the Liberal Party's candidate for the upcoming Vasse by-election; after Liberal Party nominations closed later that month, Mettam was the sole nominee. The Labor Party declined to put up a candidate for the by-election due to Vasse being an extremely safe Liberal seat. Her main opponent was thus Nationals candidate Peter Gordon. Mettam campaigned on improvements to local health and education due to the region's growing population and protecting natural assets. She said she would be willing to cross the floor on the issue of fracking. Mettam ultimately won the by-election on 18 October 2014, albeit with a swing against the Liberal Party. Mettam received 44.3 percent of the first-preference votes and 53.0 percent on a two-party-preferred basis versus the Nationals.

== In shadow cabinet ==
After the 2017 state election, newly elected leader Mike Nahan appointed Mettam to the shadow cabinet, making her the shadow minister for tourism and shadow minister for small business. After Nahan's resignation in June 2019, Liza Harvey was elected leader unopposed. Mettam roles in the new shadow cabinet were shadow minister for transport and shadow minister assisting the leader. Mettam was described by WAtoday and The West Australian as one of the biggest winners out of the cabinet reshuffle. From February 2020, she had the portfolio of ports as well, and from July 2020, she had the portfolio of fisheries. As the shadow minister for transport, Mettam criticised time and cost blowouts on Metronet, the government's project to expand and improve Perth's rail network. She also criticised the government for safety issues during the construction of the Forrestfield–Airport Link and for the government secrecy regarding major infrastructure projects.

Harvey resigned as Liberal leader in November 2020 due to extremely poor opinion polling. Zak Kirkup and Dean Nalder contested the resulting leadership election on 24 November 2020. Mettam backed Kirkup along with a majority of Liberal MPs, resulting in the withdrawal of Nalder and the election of Kirkup to the leadership unopposed. Mettam was elected deputy leader unopposed as well, making her the deputy leader of the opposition. Kirkup and Mettam were both the first Liberal leader and deputy leader since the 2017 state election to not be former members of cabinet. She retained the portfolios of transport, ports and fisheries in Kirkup's shadow cabinet.

The March 2021 state election resulted in a landslide defeat for the Liberal Party. Mettam was one of two lower house Liberal MPs to retain their seats, the other being David Honey. The Labor Party was re-elected with 53 seats in the Legislative Assembly, while the Nationals won four seats, giving them more seats than the Liberal Party and making the Nationals leader the leader of the opposition. Mettam declined to stand for Liberal leader due to not having enough support within the party, resulting in Honey becoming leader unopposed. Mettam was given the portfolios of health, mental health, disability services, and prevention of family and domestic violence.

== As Liberal leader ==
Over the two years following the 2021 state election, it became viewed as increasingly likely that Honey would be replaced as Liberal leader by Mettam. Mettam had gained a higher profile than Honey through her position as shadow health minister. An opinion poll conducted by Painted Dog Research on 5 January 2023 showed that ten percent of respondents believed that Honey was the right person to lead the Liberal Party and that 29 percent of respondents believed that Mettam was the right person to lead the party.

On Friday, 27 January 2023, Mettam revealed her intention to challenge Honey for the leadership at a special partyroom meeting the following week. The move came the same day that Nationals leader Mia Davies announced her resignation as leader. The meeting occurred on 30 January. Honey initially said that he would contest the leadership spill, but pulled out on the morning of the partyroom meeting, allowing Mettam to be voted in unopposed. Upper house MP Steve Thomas was elected deputy leader.

=== Shadow cabinet ===
Mettam and new Nationals leader Shane Love signed a new agreement between the two parties regarding the responsibilities of each party and allocation of resources, although it made little change to the previous agreement between Davies and Honey. Mettam retained her existing portfolios and gained one new portfolio, child protection, within the new shadow cabinet. Mettam requested that Nick Goiran apologise for messages he wrote in a WhatsApp group called "The Clan". He refused to apologise, resulting in him becoming the only Liberal MP not in the shadow cabinet. Peter Collier was also a member of The Clan, but he was retained in the shadow cabinet because he had apologised. Mettam dropped the portfolios of disability services and child protection in November 2023.

In February 2024, Mettam requested the resignation of deputy Liberal leader and shadow treasurer Steve Thomas from the shadow cabinet after it was revealed he had been in contact with disgraced former premier turned lobbyist Brian Burke. Thomas had used Burke as a middleman to arrange a meeting with businessman John Poynton to talk about the Bluewaters Power Station in Collie. This was revealed after Mettam had repeatedly claimed that Labor MPs had been in contact with Burke, having declared that she was "very comfortable in saying that there is no connection between Liberal Party members and Brian Burke". Tjorn Sibma had also contacted Burke to discuss "electoral, legislative or policy" matters, but Mettam refused to demote him as well. Steve Martin was elected to replace Thomas as deputy leader. Three days later, Thomas was readmitted to the shadow cabinet with his former roles except tor treasurer and deputy leader, despite Mettam saying that any Labor minister who is in contact with Burke should be removed from the cabinet.

Since Perth Lord Mayor Basil Zempilas's preselection as the Liberal Party candidate for Churchlands in January 2024, there had been speculation that the Liberal Party would make Zempilas its leader from outside Parliament, similar to how the Liberal National Party of Queensland made Brisbane Lord Mayor Campbell Newman its leader in 2011. By November 2024, Zempilas had ruled out challenging Mettam for the leadership, but would not rule out becoming leader if Mettam were to resign. Polling published by The West Australian newspaper on 26 November 2024 claimed that the Liberal Party faced another landslide defeat in the 2025 state election and that it would fare better if it replaced Mettam as leader with Zempilas. During a party room meeting that day, Neil Thomson moved a motion that the role of campaign leader be separated from the role of parliamentary leader, but the motion failed. Zempilas denied having anything to do with the poll, but it was soon revealed that the poll was commissioned by Zempilas's campaign manager Cam Sinclair via his company Ammo Marketing. Sinclair quit as campaign manager two days later.

Following the leadership motion, Thomson resigned from the shadow cabinet. The following month, Mettam let Goiran back into the frontbench as shadow attorney-general, despite earlier saying she would "probably not" ever let Goiran in.

=== Relationship with the Nationals ===
Throughout 2023, Mettam tried to reach an agreement with Nationals leader Shane Love regarding transferring the role of leader of the opposition to Mettam. The Nationals wanted a combined Legislative Council ticket between the two parties in exchange, which would have guaranteed the Nationals more elected members in the Legislative Council than otherwise would be elected. Mettam declined to take the offer, saying that she should be opposition leader because "there are more Liberals the Nationals in the opposition now, and there will be more Liberals than Nationals after the next election". After Nationals MP Merome Beard defected to the Liberal Party in October 2023 giving each party three members in the Legislative Assembly, Speaker Michelle Roberts determined that Love would remain opposition leader unless the two parties reached an agreement.

As a result of the strained relationship between the two parties, the Nationals announced that they would run candidates for seats in Perth as well as the rural areas they usually run candidates in. The Nationals also announced they would run a candidate against Mettam in Vasse, although they have yet to select a candidate. In the end, no Nationals candidate ran against Mettam.

=== Healthcare ===
After the government selected Webuild as the contractor to build the women and babies hospital in December 2024, Mettam declared she would end negotiations with the company if she became premier.

=== Indigenous affairs ===
==== Indigenous Voice to Parliament ====
In April 2023, Mettam publicly came out in support of the proposed Indigenous Voice to Parliament being advocated by Prime Minister Anthony Albanese, which was contrary to the position of the federal Liberal Party, led by Peter Dutton.

However, by August 2023, Mettam walked back her support for the proposed Indigenous Voice to Parliament indicating her intention to vote no.

==== Aboriginal flag ====
In January 2025, Mettam declared that she would not stand in front of the Aboriginal flag at press conferences if she became premier, following federal Liberal leader Peter Dutton's stance on the Aboriginal flag. She said that "when I speak to West Australians [sic], I intend to speak for all of them and only the state flag and the national flag achieve that." Her position has been widely criticised. Former Liberal minister for Indigenous Australians Ken Wyatt said that her stance was "short-sighted" and "divisive", and pointed out the hypocrisy of Mettam being fine with standing in front of flags with the Union Jack on them. Premier Cook said that her stance was "cynical" and "desperate" and abandoned four to five decades of work on reconciliation.

=== 2025 election ===
Mettam led the Liberal party as their candidate for the 2025 Western Australian state election. She led the party to another landslide defeat by Labor and premier Roger Cook, giving the party a third consecutive four-year term, and becoming the first party to do so in WA since 1989. The party won seven seats in total, one of which was Mettam's seat for Vasse, against Labor's 46 seats and the National's 6 seats. Mettam however did lead the Liberal's to a vote increase of over six percent to 28%.

=== Resignation as leader ===
On 20 March 2025, shortly after her election loss, Mettam announced the she was stepping down as the leader of the Liberal party in Western Australia. Mettam thanked her colleagues in a statement and said that the election "has not delivered in a gain of seats" for her party as they'd hoped. She went on to say that she "takes full responsibly for the result". She was immediately tipped to be replaced by media personality and newly elected Churchlands MP Basil Zempilas after he revealed he was interested in succeeding Mettam as the leader. Zempilas was officially announced as the party's new leader on 25 March, with Mettam stepping down to deputy leader, a role which she previously held from 2020 to 2023.

Western Australian Legislative Assembly
Preceded by Troy Buswell	Member for Vasse; 2014–present	Incumbent
Political offices
Preceded by Bill Marmion	Deputy Leader of the Opposition; 2020–2021	Succeeded by Shane Love
Preceded by Peter Rundle	Deputy Leader of the Opposition; 2025–present	Incumbent
Party political offices
Preceded by Bill Marmion	Deputy Leader of the Western Australian Liberal Party; 2020–2023	Succeeded by Steve Thomas
Preceded by David Honey	Leader of the Western Australian Liberal Party; 2023–2025	Succeeded by Basil Zempilas
Preceded by Steve Martin	Deputy Leader of the Western Australian Liberal Party; 2025–present	Incumbent
