= Branch stacking =

Australian politics term for recruitment strategy

In Australian politics, branch stacking is the act of recruiting or signing up members for a local branch of a political party for the principal purpose of influencing the outcome of internal preselection of candidates for public office, or of inordinately influencing the party's policy.

Allegations of such practices have become controversial in Australia after several inquiries or contests which received mainstream media attention. Most political parties now have clauses in their constitutions to allow "head office" intervention to resolve alleged stacking or other allegations of fraud, with penalties for those who engage in it. Branch stacking itself is legal under Australian law since it is an internal party matter, but some activities like providing false information to the Australian Electoral Commission, such as the numbers of members, can be prosecuted as fraud.

There are several ways that branch stacking may influence the way in which decisions are made within political parties. For example, a party faction may enrol many members who belong to the faction or agree to vote in the manner instructed by the faction's leaders.

== By party ==
=== Labor Party ===
In the Australian Labor Party (ALP), besides membership stacking, another technique is to take advantage of the favoured position of unions within the party, especially the significant vote they have at ALP state and national conferences, which, in turn, determine party policy and elect internal office holders and the membership of committees. The committees may, in turn, determine preselections for party candidates at elections. The number of members in a union determines the number of delegates to the conferences to which it is entitled, which offers an opportunity for stacking to take place at the union level, which then flows through to other organs of the ALP. Another avenue of stacking is the Young Labor wing of the ALP, which also sends delegates to ALP conferences, and is entitled to a seat on the ALP National Executive.

Party factions and the so-called "numbers men" try to work within and sometimes outside the rules to advance their causes and to reward their supporters. Some have labelled the faction leaders and numbers men as the faceless men of the Labor Party, who have also been accused of being driving forces for the election of party leaders and cabinet ministers and the removal of prime ministers. When all factions play the system, it is not possible to tell the true views of party members on particular issues. The Hawke-Wran review of the ALP in 2002 claimed that branch stacking, largely driven by factions seeking to expand their influence, had a "cancerous" effect on the party and a "deadening" effect on branch activity, as many of the recruited members have no commitment to the party.

=== Liberal Party ===
Commentators and authors who are or were in the Liberal Party of Australia have claimed that similar activity in its branches has had a similar effect. A recent example of alleged branch stacking in the Liberal Party occurred in 2017, with Liberals in Victoria claiming that members from within the party's religious right were stacking branches with Mormons and Catholic groups in a drive to preselect more conservative candidates. A similar situation was reported in 2019, with allegations that members of the Liberal Party's hard-right faction in Sydney were attempting to engage in branch stacking to erode the support of factional rivals, which included sitting Liberal members in several safe state and federal seats.

In 2021, branch stacking within the Western Australian Liberals was presumed to be a factor in the party's defeat in the prior state election following a cache of leaked WhatsApp messages. Branch stacking by a faction called The Clan resulted in a concentration of more right-wing, conservative candidates. Among The Clan's members were Mathias Cormann, Ian Goodenough, Peter Collier and Nick Goiran. Former premier Colin Barnett believes this adversely impacted the party's election outcome and an internal review of the election defeat is forthcoming.

=== One Nation ===
In 2023, former NSW One Nation leader Mark Latham alleged that party founder and federal party leader Pauline Hanson had been involved in branch stacking in New South Wales after Hanson removed Latham as the party's state leader in New South Wales. Hanson has denied the allegations. The party's three MPs in the State Parliament (Latham, Tania Mihailuk and Rod Roberts; all members of the Legislative Council) were divided on loyalties: Mihailuk was reported to have sided with Hanson and had a "troubled relationship" with Latham, while Roberts sided with Latham. Latham and Roberts eventually left the party and sat as independents after Latham alleged that One Nation misused electoral funds and that there was a "Queensland taker of the NSW branch".

== Methods ==
Activities commonly considered to be branch stacking include the following:

- Paying others' party membership fee with or without their knowledge.
- Recruiting members on the condition of voting a particular way.
- Recruiting members for the express purpose of influencing the outcome of a ballot within the party.
- Recruiting members who do not live at the claimed address of enrolment.
- Enrolling people on the electoral roll with false information about their identity or their address of enrolment, which may either take the form of consensual false enrolment, or of forgery.
- Organising or paying concessional rate fees for those who are ineligible for concessional rates.
- "Cemetery voting", or using the names of dead people to vote in a party preselection.
- Offering inducements to younger or less powerful party members to engage in such behaviour.

== Notable instances ==
- In Queensland in 2001, the Shepherdson Inquiry examined allegations of electoral fraud within the Labor Party in that state. While it concluded that no public elections had been influenced, it found that "the practice of making consensual false enrolments to bolster the chances of specific candidates in preselections was regarded by some Party members as a legitimate campaign tactic." As a result of the Inquiry, several people, including at least three sitting MPs, either resigned or were expelled from the Labor Party.
- Allegations of branch-stacking relating to the federal seat of Division of Wentworth within the Liberal Party's New South Wales division were published in 2006 by John Hyde Page, who both detailed his own role in the process and made allegations about numerous Liberal members and figures. Some of those named took successful legal actions for defamation and the book was subsequently pulled from the shelves.
- In 2006, Michael Towke was accused of branch stacking. He was replaced as Liberal Party candidate by Scott Morrison, who went on to become Prime Minister of Australia in 2018.
- In March 2018, during the course of the 2018 Batman by-election campaign, Australian Greens candidate Alex Bhathal was accused of bullying party members and branch stacking, claims which she denied.
- In October 2018, ABC News revealed an instance of branch stacking in the NSW Young Nationals, with the alleged intention of advancing an 'alt-right' agenda within the party.
- In June 2020, 60 Minutes aired allegations against Victoria Labor MP Adem Somyurek that he was involved in branch stacking. Following the release of recordings, on 15 June 2020, Premier Andrews sacked Somyurek from his cabinet and referred Somyurek's conduct to Victoria Police and the Independent Broad-based Anti-corruption Commission for further investigation. Andrews also wrote to the National Executive of the Australian Labor Party (ALP) to seek the termination of Somyurek's party membership. Later that day, the Labor Party's national president, Wayne Swan, confirmed that Somyurek had resigned his membership, adding that Labor's National Executive Committee had taken further steps to ensure there would "never be a place for Somyurek in the ALP ever again".
- In August 2020, The Age published an article of allegations against Federal Liberal MP Michael Sukkar and power broker Marcus Bastiaan of branch stacking.
- Between 2017 and 2022, the Victorian Liberal Party branches in Gippsland and Morwell had been infiltrated by Pentecostal religious figures. One such figure was a pastor who made sermons proselytising about the creation of a religious theocracy in Australia. Internal investigations saw 150 members expelled after memberships were paid for by other people, a breach of the rules.

== See also ==
- Politics of Australia
- Canvassing
- Entryism
