= Sandra Brewer =

Australian politician

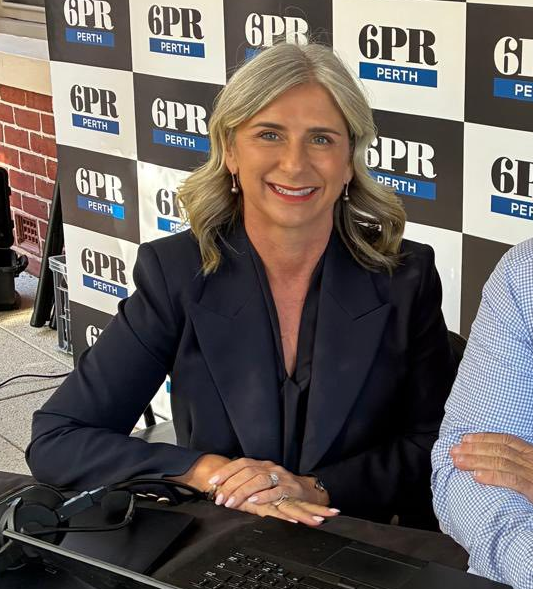

Member of the Western Australian Legislative Assembly
- Incumbent
- Assumed office 8 March 2025
- Preceded by: David Honey
- Constituency: Cottesloe

Personal details
- Party: Liberal
- Website: www.sandrabrewer.com.au

Sandra Brewer is an Australian politician who has been the member for Cottesloe in the Western Australian Legislative Assembly representing the Liberal Party since the 2025 state election. Prior to that, she was the executive director of the Western Australian division of the Property Council of Australia.

== Career ==
In February 2024, Brewer defeated incumbent Liberal MP David Honey and lawyer Richard Evans for preselection for the electoral district of Cottesloe, winning an outright majority against her two opponents. Honey criticised Brewer for being in favour of property development.

Since gaining preselection for the Liberal Party, Brewer has adopted a more anti-property development stance, including opposing a 16-storey development near Cottesloe railway station in the Cottesloe town centre.

In the 2025 state election, Brewer's main opponent was independent Rachel Horncastle, who campaigned against Brewer's links to property developers. Brewer won Cottesloe with approximately 56 percent of the two-candidate-preferred vote.
