= 2018 Cottesloe state by-election =

Western Australian state by-election

- 17 March 2018

	First party	Second party
Candidate	David Honey	Greg Boland
Party	Liberal	Greens
Popular vote	10,872	3,555
Percentage	59.9%	19.6%
Swing	▲3.2pp	▲7.5pp
TCP	70.2%	29.8%
TCP swing	▲6.9pp	▲29.8pp
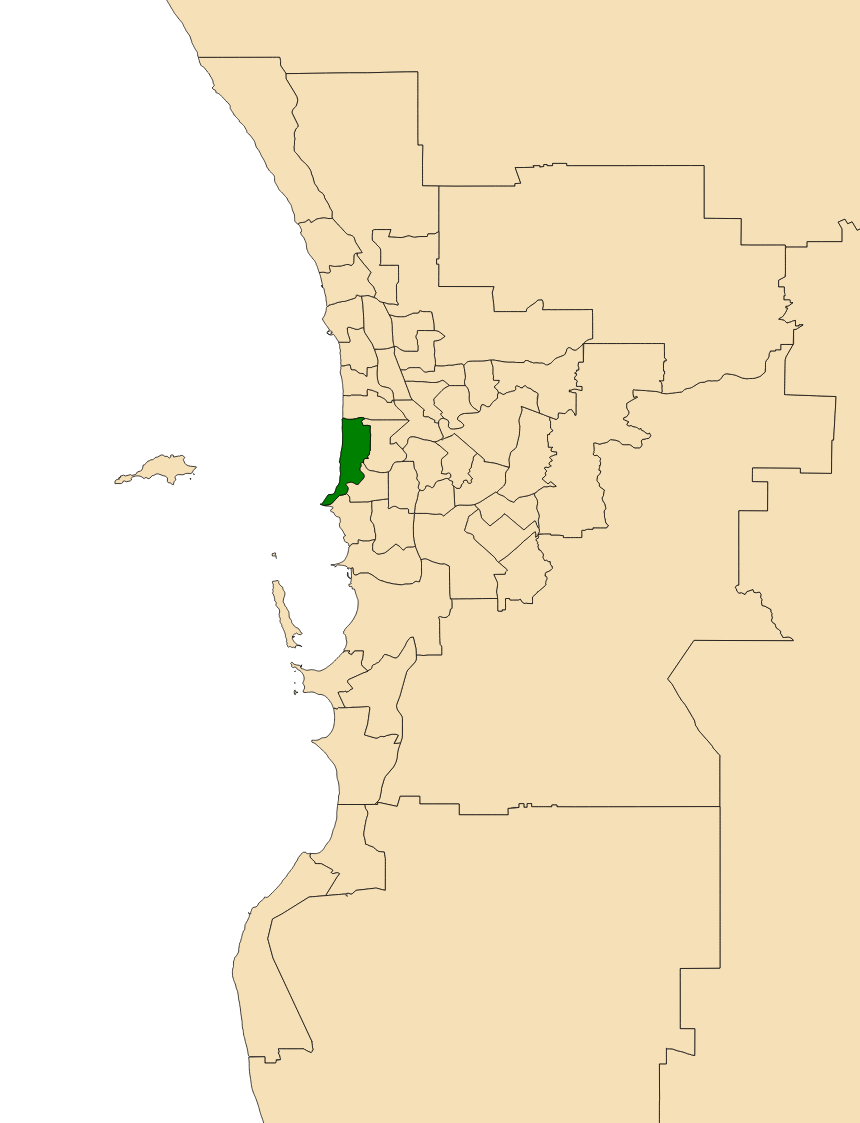
- Map showing the location of the electoral district of Cottesloe (dark green) in metropolitan Perth, Western Australia.
MP before election
Colin Barnett
Liberal
Elected MP
David Honey
Liberal

A by-election for the electoral district of Cottesloe in Western Australia took place on 17 March 2018. The by-election was triggered by the resignation of the Liberal Party member, Colin Barnett, on 5 February 2018. Barnett was the Premier of Western Australia from 23 September 2008 until 17 March 2017, when he was succeeded as Premier by Mark McGowan after the Labor Party defeated Barnett's Liberal government at the 2017 state election in March 2017. The by-election was won by the Liberal candidate David Honey.

== Dates ==
The writ for the by-election was issued by the Speaker of the Legislative Assembly, Peter Watson, on 6 February 2018.

The by-election was held on 17 March 2018, the same day as the South Australian state election and the Batman federal by-election.

== Candidates ==
The Labor Party announced it would not nominate a candidate for the by-election.

Candidates in ballot paper order
Party	Candidate	Background
Liberal	David Honey	Honey is a manager at Alcoa, president of the Kwinana Industries Council and former state president of the Liberal Party in Western Australia.
Micro Business	Cam Tinley	Contested the Legislative Council at the 2017 state election.
Independent	Michael Thomas	Running to advocate for completion of the Perth–Fremantle PSP Bike Path.
Western Australia	Ron Norris	Former mayor of Mosman Park.
Greens	Greg Boland	Previously contested Cottesloe for the Greens at three state elections.
Independent	Michael Tucak	Member of the Cottesloe Town Council. Contested the Legislative Council at the 2017 state election.
Independent	Dmitry Malov	Previously contested Cottesloe at the 2017 state election.

== Results ==
Cottesloe state by-election, 2018
Party	Candidate	Votes	%	±%
Liberal	David Honey	10,872	59.9	+3.2
Greens	Greg Boland	3,555	19.6	+7.5
Western Australia	Ron Norris	1,636	9.0	+9.0
Independent	Michael Tucak	977	5.4	+5.4
Micro Business	Cam Tinley	605	3.3	+3.3
Independent	Michael Thomas	402	2.2	+2.2
Independent	Dmitry Malov	112	0.6	+0.2
Total formal votes		18,159	98.0	+1.4
Informal votes		364	2.0	−1.4
Turnout		18,523	66.6	−21.8
Two-candidate-preferred result
Liberal	David Honey	12,738	70.2	+6.9
Greens	Greg Boland	5,416	29.8	+29.8
Liberal hold		Swing	+6.9	

== See also ==
- List of Western Australian state by-elections
- 2018 Darling Range state by-election
