= Rehoboth Christian College =

Location
- Perth, Western Australia; Australia; 32°02′01″S 115°58′46″E

Information
- Former names: Rehoboth Christian School; Rehoboth Christian Primary School; Rehoboth Christian High School
- Type: Independent Christian co-educational primary and secondary day school
- Motto: Latin: Soli Deo Gloria (For the Glory of God Alone)
- Denomination: Trans-denominational Protestant
- Established: 1966; 60 years ago
- Chairman: Frank van der Kooy
- Employees: ~149
- Enrolment: c. 805
- Campus: Wilson: Kindergarten to Year 6; Kenwick: Kindergarten to Year 12
- Colours: Blue, red and white
- Slogan: Purpose, Partnership, Preparation - Committed to Distinctly Christian Education
- Affiliations: Christian Education National; Association of Independent Schools of Western Australia
- Website: www.rehoboth.wa.edu.au

Rehoboth Christian College is a dual-campus independent trans-denominational Protestant co-educational primary and secondary day school, located in the south-eastern corridor of Perth, Western Australia. The college comprises a Year K to Year 6 campus in the suburb of Wilson, and a Year K to Year 12 campus in the suburb of Kenwick. The college currently enrols some 1000 students across its two campuses.

Rehoboth pioneered the establishment in Western Australia of a parent-directed style of school governance and a distinctive approach to curriculum which have since been adopted by a number of other schools. Rehoboth is affiliated with Christian Education National and with the Association of Independent Schools of Western Australia.

Rehoboth Christian College was formerly called Rehoboth Christian School and for many years using separate designations, was called Rehoboth Christian Primary School and Rehoboth Christian High School.

== History ==
Rehoboth is part of a Christian school movement having its origins in Europe and brought to Australia by post-World War II migrants. Its distinctive parent-governance model was innovative in an era when most Christian schools were run by churches. It was established by an association of parents, The Association for Christian Education (Perth) Inc., which was established in 1959, and was the first school of its type in Western Australia when it opened its doors in 1966. Its main distinctive by comparison with the church-operated schools was an intent to relate Christian belief to all areas of the curriculum. At the same time, teaching was focused on the mainstream curriculum, and the school consciously avoided packaged curriculum materials such as Accelerated Christian Education. The role of the parent was paramount, both in school governance and in taking final responsibility for the education of the child, of which schooling was considered only a part.

The college commenced as a primary school only, and it was another 11 years before, in 1977, a secondary campus was established in temporary premises at Kensington. Known in its first year as Rehoboth Christian Secondary School, it moved to its current location at Kenwick in 1979, becoming Rehoboth Christian High School, in keeping with conventional local nomenclature practice at the time. For many years the Primary and Secondary Campuses operated distinctly, but in 2005 Primary and Pre-Primary classes also commenced on the Kenwick site. An earlier second Primary work at the southern Perth suburb of Yangebup, commenced at that more remote location from its core population because of restrictions imposed by the Hawke-Keating Labor government in the early 1990s, had ultimately failed because of its distance from the other campuses, and closed its doors after 10 years. In 2009 the school became Rehoboth Christian College.

The philosophy of schooling represented by Rehoboth was taken up by other Christians in Western Australia in the early 1980s, as several parent associations were established in other parts of Perth leading to the establishment of similar schools, as well as in several country centres across Western Australia. In the early 21st century Rehoboth was one of the smaller schools of its type in Western Australia as it sought to maintain its distinctiveness and the integrity of its philosophy.

== House system ==
Rehoboth uses a house system through which students participate in inter-house activities and competitions. The three houses are:

- Newton (green and gold), named for 18th century pastor, hymn writer, former slave trader and anti-slavery campaigner John Newton
- Tyndale (black and white), named for 16th century church reformer and Bible translator William Tyndale
- Wycliffe (red and blue), named for 14th century church reformer and Bible translator John Wycliffe

== Notable alumni ==
- Nick Goiran – Member of the Western Australian Legislative Council representing South Metropolitan Region
- Andrew Swallow – AFL footballer
- David Swallow – AFL footballer

== See also ==
- List of schools in the Perth metropolitan area
