= Steve Thomas (politician) =

Australian politician

The Honourable Steve Thomas MLC

Deputy Leader of the Liberal Party of Western Australia
- In office 30 January 2023 – 28 February 2024
- Leader: Libby Mettam
- Preceded by: Libby Mettam
- Succeeded by: Steve Martin

Member of the Western Australian Legislative Council for South West Region
- Incumbent
- Assumed office 22 May 2017

Member of the Western Australian Legislative Assembly for Capel
- In office 26 February 2005 – 6 September 2008
- Preceded by: New seat
- Succeeded by: Seat abolished

Personal details
- Born: 3 October 1967 (age 58) Mansfield, Victoria, Australia
- Party: Liberal
- Profession: Veterinary Surgeon

Steven Caldwell Thomas (born 3 October 1967) is an Australian politician. He is a Liberal member of the Western Australian Legislative Council, having represented South West Region since 2017. He served as the party's deputy leader from 2023 to 2024. He was previously a member of the Western Australian Legislative Assembly from 2005 to 2008 representing the electorate of Capel.

== Early life ==
Thomas was born in Mansfield, Victoria. Prior to entering politics Thomas was a veterinary surgeon and has a degree in veterinary science.

== Legislative Assembly ==
On entering Parliament Thomas was appointed as acting speaker of the Legislative Assembly (lower house) in March 2005 and was a member of the Public Accounts Committee from April 2005. Thomas was appointed as the shadow minister of the Environment for most of 2006 and from January 2008 acted as the shadow treasurer.

The seat of Capel was abolished and merged with Collie-Wellington and parts of Vasse into the new seat of Collie-Preston. Thomas contested the seat in the 2008 election and lost narrowly to Labor candidate and member for Collie-Wellington, Mick Murray.

== Legislative Council ==
Thomas was elected at the 2017 election to represent South West Region in the Legislative Council (upper house), starting from 22 May 2017.

Thomas was elected as deputy party leader in the 30 January 2023 Liberal Party leadership spill. He resigned from this role on 27 February 2024 after The West Australian newspaper revealed he had been in contact with former premier Brian Burke, despite Liberal leader Libby Mettam having claimed none of her frontbenchers had been in contact with Burke.
