= Electoral district of Cottesloe =

State electoral district in Perth, Western Australia

Cottesloe Western Australia—Legislative Assembly
- Interactive map of electoral district boundaries from the 2025 state election
- State: Western Australia
- Dates current: 1950–present
- MP: Sandra Brewer
- Party: Liberal
- Namesake: Cottesloe
- Electors: 33,150 (2025)
- Area: 33 km^{2} (12.7 sq mi)
- Demographic: Metropolitan
- Coordinates: 32.00°S 115.77°E
Electorates around Cottesloe:
| Indian Ocean | Churchlands | Churchlands |
| Indian Ocean | Cottesloe | Nedlands |
| Indian Ocean | Fremantle | Bicton |

Cottesloe is a Legislative Assembly electorate in the state of Western Australia. Cottesloe is named for the western Perth suburb of Cottesloe, which falls within its borders. A previous member, Colin Barnett, was the 29th premier of Western Australia (2008–2017).

The current member, Sandra Brewer of the Liberal Party, was elected in the 2025 state election.

== History ==
Cottesloe was created at the 1948 redistribution, at which three new metropolitan electorates were created to replace former northern and agricultural seats in Parliament. Its first member was elected at the 1950 election, and it has always been held by the Liberal Party and its predecessors. For much of that time, it was a comfortably safe Liberal seat. Indeed, the Liberals have won an outright majority on the first count all but once in its existence. The Liberal hold on the seat has only been remotely threatened twice, in 1980 and 1983. While the margin dropped to marginal in those elections, the Liberals still won enough primary votes to retain the seat outright.

It has only had five members, all of whom have been promoted to Cabinet or the opposition front bench. The first, Sir Ross Hutchinson, served as a senior minister in the Brand government and was Speaker in the first term of the Charles Court government. He was succeeded in 1977 by Bill Hassell, who served as Opposition Leader against Premier Brian Burke in 1984–1986. Hassell retired in 1990, and was succeeded by economist Colin Barnett at a by-election. Barnett served as Minister for Energy and, after 1995, Education during the Richard Court government in 1993–2001, and Opposition Leader in 2001–2005. Barnett, seen as a moderate within Liberal ranks, resigned the leadership after the 2005 election. He had originally planned to retire at the 2008 election, but after the troubled seven-month leadership of Troy Buswell and generally poor opinion polls, Barnett was persuaded to reconsider (the nominated candidate for Cottesloe, Deidre Willmott, stood aside), and regained the leadership on 6 August 2008 on a unanimous party vote, one day before the 2008 election was called. At this election, Barnett became Premier of a minority Liberal-National government.

Barnett led the Liberals to a decisive victory in 2013, but was heavily defeated in 2017 and returned to the backbench. As a measure of how safe this seat has been for the Liberals, Barnett suffered a swing of 7.8 percent but still retained it with a comfortable margin of 63.3 percent, making Cottesloe the Liberals' safest metropolitan seat and the second-safest statewide. He resigned later in 2018, and businessman David Honey easily retained the seat for the Liberals with a healthy swing in his favour. At the next state election in 2021, Honey lost 10 percent of his primary vote, but retained the seat on 57 percent of the two-party vote, dropping Cottesloe to fairly safe for the first time since 1983. Cottesloe became one of only two remaining Liberal-held seats, and the only Liberal held seat in Perth. Honey became the leader of what remained of the Liberal Party. Honey therefore became the third member for Cottlesloe and in a row to serve as leader of the state Liberal Party.

Honey lost preselection in February 2024 to Sandra Brewer, who retained Cottesloe for the Liberals in the 2025 state election. Brewer was immediately promoted to the opposition front bench as shadow Treasurer.

== Geography ==
As at the 2007 redistribution, Cottesloe is bounded by Loch Street and Brockway Road to the east, Perry Lakes and Bold Park to the north, the Indian Ocean to the west, and the Swan River to the south and southeast. It includes the suburbs of Claremont, Cottesloe, Mosman Park, Mount Claremont, North Fremantle, Peppermint Grove and Swanbourne. Major features within the electorate include Campbell Barracks (Australia), The Grove Library and The Grove Community History Library, Cottesloe Beach and several private schools including Scotch College, Christ Church Grammar School, Methodist Ladies' College and Presbyterian Ladies' College.

Prior to the redistribution, it had additionally contained sections of City Beach and Floreat, which were moved north into neighbouring Churchlands.

== Demographics ==
Cottesloe and the neighbouring electorates of Churchlands to the north and Nedlands to the east comprise the affluent western suburbs of Perth—the Australian Bureau of Statistics's SEIFA index (2001) ranked them as the highest three electorates by socio-economic status in Western Australia, with high scores on educational and employment opportunity. At the 2006 census, the median individual income in the Cottesloe electorate, based on its 2005 boundaries, was $639 per week compared to $513 in the Perth metropolitan area, and the median weekly household income was $1,416 compared to $1,086 across Perth. 56.8% of the population were professionals or managers.

== Members for Cottesloe ==
| Member | Party | Term |
|---|---|---|
| Sir Ross Hutchinson | Liberal Country League | 1950–1968 |
| Sir Ross Hutchinson | Liberal | 1968–1977 |
| Bill Hassell | Liberal | 1977–1990 |
| Colin Barnett | Liberal | 1990–2018 |
| David Honey | Liberal | 2018–2025 |
| Sandra Brewer | Liberal | 2025–present |

== Election results ==
2025 Western Australian state election: Cottesloe
| Party | Candidate | Votes | % | ±% |
|---|---|---|---|---|
| Liberal | Sandra Brewer | 14,612 | 50.7 | +3.8 |
| Independent | Rachel Horncastle | 7,771 | 26.9 | +26.9 |
| Labor | Amy Astill | 3,445 | 11.9 | −16.4 |
| Greens | Heidi Hardisty | 2,376 | 8.2 | −4.4 |
| Legalise Cannabis | Jessica Yu | 636 | 2.2 | +2.2 |
| Total formal votes | | 28,840 | 97.8 | +0.4 |
| Informal votes | | 657 | 2.2 | −0.4 |
| Turnout | | 29,497 | 89.0 | +3.2 |
Two-candidate-preferred result
| Liberal | Sandra Brewer | 16,019 | 55.6 | −1.9 |
| Independent | Rachel Horncastle | 12,817 | 44.4 | +44.4 |
| Liberal hold | | | | |
