= Peter Collier (politician) =

Australian politician

The Honourable Peter Collier MLC

Member of the Western Australian Legislative Council
- In office 22 May 2005 – 22 May 2025
- Constituency: North Metropolitan Region
Ministerial positions
Minister for Energy
In office 23 September 2008 – 21 March 2013
Premier	Colin Barnett
Preceded by	Fran Logan
Succeeded by	Mike Nahan
Minister for Training and Workforce Development
In office 23 September 2008 – 29 June 2012
Premier	Colin Barnett
Preceded by	Position re-established (Note: The portfolio of Minister for Training was merged with the portfolio of Minister for Education and Training until September 2008, where Mark McGowan was the minister.)
Succeeded by	Murray Cowper
Minister for Aboriginal Affairs (Note: After March 2013, Collier's title was Minister for Aboriginal Affairs, changing from the title of Minister for Indigenous Affairs.)
In office 14 December 2010 – 17 March 2017
Premier	Colin Barnett
Preceded by	Kim Hames
Succeeded by	Ben Wyatt
Minister for Education
In office 29 June 2012 – 17 March 2017
Premier	Colin Barnett
Preceded by	Liz Constable
Succeeded by	Sue Ellery
Minister for Electoral Affairs
In office 21 March 2013 – 16 March 2017
Premier	Colin Barnett
Preceded by	Norman Moore
Succeeded by	Bill Johnston

Personal details
- Born: 25 February 1959 (age 67) Kalgoorlie, Western Australia, Australia
- Party: Liberal
- Education: University of Western Australia

Peter Charles Collier (born 25 February 1959) is an Australian former politician who was a Liberal Party member of the Western Australian Legislative Council from 2005 to 2025, representing the North Metropolitan Region. He served as a minister in the government of Colin Barnett from 2008 until its defeat at the 2017 state election.

== Early life ==
Collier was born in Kalgoorlie, Western Australia, to Beryl Lillian (née Davies) and Les Collier. He attended Eastern Goldfields Senior High School before going on to the University of Western Australia, where he studied teaching. After graduating, Collier taught at various high schools in the Perth metropolitan area, both public and private. He taught for periods at John Curtin Senior High School (1981–1983), Lesmurdie Senior High School (1985–1986), Presbyterian Ladies' College (1987–1988), and Scotch College (1990–2005). Outside of his teaching career, Collier was also a professional tennis coach. He spent a season on the WTA Tour in 1989, coaching Jenny Byrne, Jo-Anne Faull, and Dianne Van Rensburg.

== Politics ==
Collier first stood for parliament at the 2001 state election, running unsuccessfully in fourth position on the Liberal Party's ticket in North Metropolitan Region. Prior to the election, he had been accused of forging signatures on membership forms and using people's names without their consent in order to secure party preselection. He denied the allegations, and a police investigation found there was "insufficient evidence against him". At the 2005 state election, Collier was elevated to second position on the Liberal Party's ticket, and was elected to a term starting in May 2005. One of his unsuccessful opponents for preselection was Alan Cadby, a sitting member, who subsequently resigned from the Liberal Party to sit as an independent.

Collier was elevated to the Liberal shadow ministry shortly after his election, and served under four leaders of the opposition (Matt Birney, Paul Omodei, Troy Buswell, and Colin Barnett). After the Liberal Party's victory at the 2008 state election, he was made Minister for Energy and Minister for Training and Workforce Development (Note: Until November 2009, Collier's title was Minister for Training.) in the new ministry formed by Colin Barnett. In December 2010, Collier was also made Minister for Indigenous Affairs. In a ministerial reshuffle in June 2012, he replaced Liz Constable as Minister for Education, but lost the training portfolio to Murray Cowper. In a further reshuffle after the 2013 state election, Collier was made Minister for Electoral Affairs, but was replaced as energy minister by Mike Nahan.

Following the 2017 Western Australian state election, he held multiple shadow ministry portfolios such as Housing, Disability Services, Sports and Recreation, Police & Corrective Services, and Culture & the Arts.

He also became leader of the Liberal Party in the Legislative Council, where he served as the Leader of the Government in the Legislative Council from March 2013 to March 2017, and the Leader of the Opposition in the Legislative Council from March 2017 to March 2021, and again from February 2024 to May 2025.

It was revealed in the media in 2021 that Collier was part of a factional group of powerbrokers within his party known as "The Clan", alongside former federal finance minister Mathias Cormann and Nick Goiran. Leaked WhatsApp messages revealed that Collier sent sexist messages to other group members that referred to female Liberal members as "sandwich makers", "bitches" and "toxic cows".

Collier retired from politics in May 2025 and did not stand for election in the 2025 Western Australian state election.

== Notes ==
Parliament of Western Australia
Political offices
New creation	Minister for Training and Workforce Development; 2008–2012	Succeeded by Murray Cowper
Preceded by Fran Logan	Minister for Energy; 2008–2013	Succeeded by Mike Nahan
Preceded by Kim Hames	Minister for Aboriginal Affairs; 2010–2017	Succeeded by Ben Wyatt
Preceded by Liz Constable	Minister for Education; 2012–2017	Succeeded by Sue Ellery as Minister for Education and Training
Preceded by Norman Moore	Minister for Electoral Affairs; 2013–2017	Succeeded by Bill Johnston
