= Mathias Cormann =

Secretary-General of the OECD

The Honourable Mathias Cormann AC
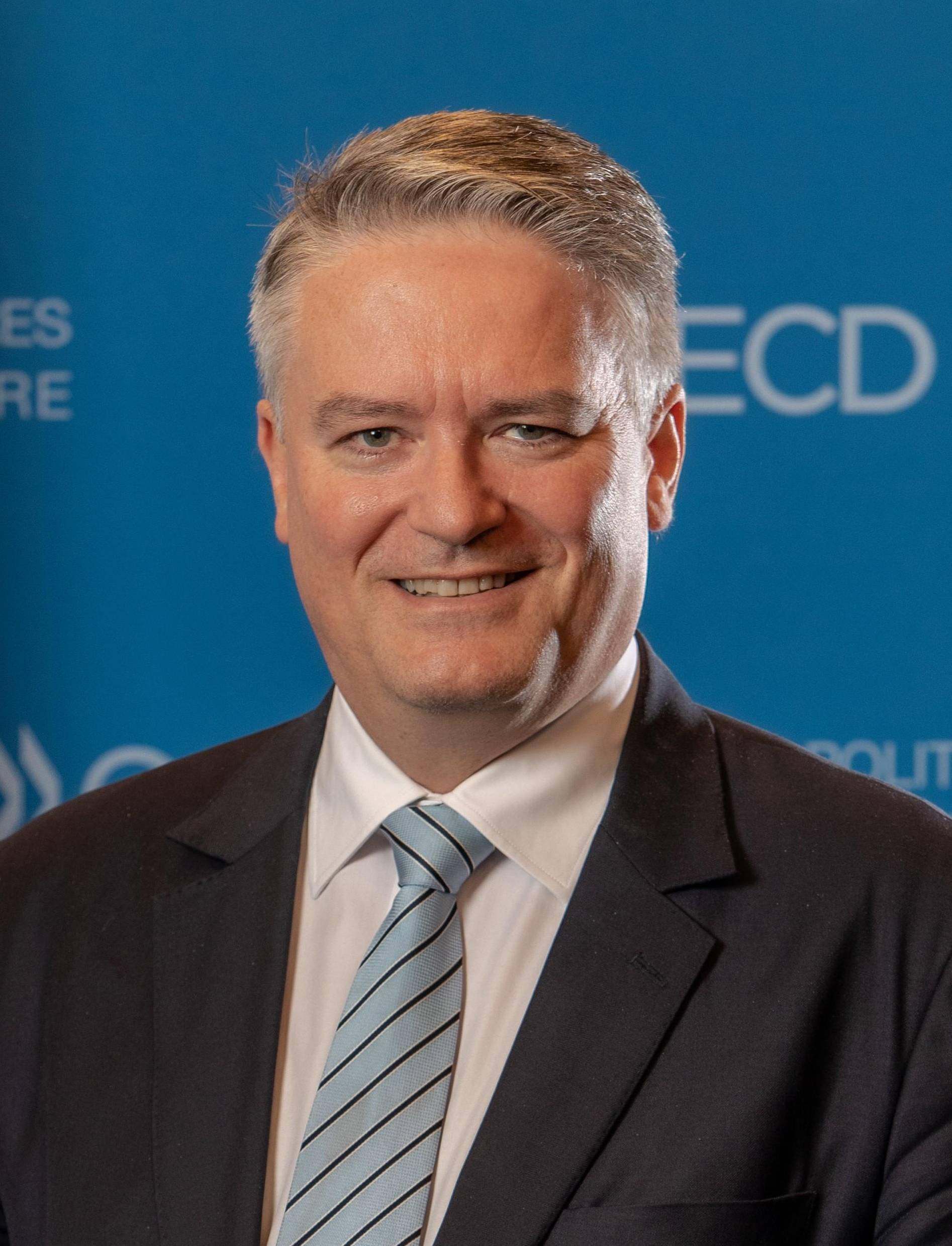
- Official portrait, 2021

6th Secretary-General of the OECD
- Incumbent
- Assumed office 1 June 2021
- Preceded by: José Ángel Gurría

Minister for Finance
- In office 18 September 2013 – 30 October 2020 Serving with Scott Morrison (2020)
- Prime Minister: Tony Abbott; Malcolm Turnbull; Scott Morrison
- Preceded by: Penny Wong
- Succeeded by: Simon Birmingham

Leader of the Government in the Senate
- In office 20 December 2017 – 30 October 2020
- Prime Minister: Malcolm Turnbull; Scott Morrison
- Preceded by: George Brandis
- Succeeded by: Simon Birmingham

Vice-President of the Executive Council
- In office 20 December 2017 – 30 October 2020
- Prime Minister: Malcolm Turnbull; Scott Morrison
- Preceded by: George Brandis
- Succeeded by: Simon Birmingham

Special Minister of State
- In office 29 May 2019 – 30 October 2020
- Prime Minister: Scott Morrison
- Preceded by: Alex Hawke
- Succeeded by: Simon Birmingham
- In office 13 November 2017 – 23 August 2018
- Prime Minister: Malcolm Turnbull
- Preceded by: Scott Ryan
- Succeeded by: Alex Hawke
- In office 29 December 2015 – 19 July 2016
- Prime Minister: Malcolm Turnbull
- Preceded by: Mal Brough
- Succeeded by: Scott Ryan

Senator for Western Australia
- In office 19 June 2007 – 6 November 2020
- Preceded by: Ian Campbell
- Succeeded by: Ben Small

Personal details
- Born: Mathias Hubert Paul Cormann; 20 September 1970 (age 56) Eupen, Liège, Belgium
- Citizenship: Australian (2000–present); Belgian (1970–2000)
- Party: Liberal
- Other political affiliations: Christian Social Party (Belgium)
- Education: Université de Namur; Katholieke Universiteit Leuven
- Profession: Lawyer
- Website: mathiascormann.com.au

Mathias Hubert Paul Cormann (/məˈtiːəs ˈkɔːrmən/; German: [maˈtiːas ˈkɔʁman]; born 20 September 1970) is a Belgian-born Australian politician and diplomat who has been the Secretary-General of the OECD since 2021.

Cormann was Australian Minister for Finance from 2013 to 2020 and a Senator from Western Australia for the Liberal Party from 2007 to 2020. His tenure of more than seven years as Minister for Finance was the longest in Australian history, spanning the Abbott, Turnbull, and Morrison governments. On 20 December 2017, Prime Minister Malcolm Turnbull promoted Cormann to be Leader of the Government in the Senate. He also served as Special Minister of State from 2015 to 2016, 2017 to 2018 and 2019 to 2020, and as Minister for the Public Service from 2018 to 2019. As leader of the government in the Senate, Cormann was also the Vice-President of the Executive Council.

Cormann retired from politics in October 2020 in order to be nominated by Prime Minister Scott Morrison as Australia's candidate for Secretary-General of the OECD. On 12 March 2021, he was elected as the next OECD Secretary-General, winning support from a majority of OECD Member States. He is the first Australian elected to this position.

== Early life ==
Cormann was born on 20 September 1970 in Eupen, Belgium, within the country's German-speaking Community. He is the oldest of four children and only son born to Hildegard and Herbert Cormann. Cormann grew up in the village of Raeren, around 5 kilometres (3 mi) from the Belgian-German border. At the time of his birth, his father worked as a turner at a factory in Germany. When he was ten years old, his father spent six months in hospital with a severe illness that left him unable to work; he subsequently became an alcoholic but recovered. The family relied on a disability pension and assistance from the local Catholic church, where Cormann served as an altar boy.

After beginning his education locally, Cormann completed his secondary schooling in Liège, where he learnt French as a second language. He went on to the University of Namur, where he attained the degree of candidate in law. In 1989, he and some university friends drove to Berlin to witness the Fall of the Berlin Wall. He has cited his experiences of the systems used in East and West Germany as influential in his political development. Cormann later undertook law graduate studies at the Katholieke Universiteit Leuven, attaining the degree of licentiate and learning Dutch. He learned English as a fourth language in 1993 while on an Erasmus Programme exchange to the University of East Anglia in Norwich, England.

== Early career and move to Australia ==
Cormann's parents were not politically active. He nonetheless joined the German-speaking Christian Social Party (CSP) at a young age and was elected to Raeren's municipal council at the age of 21. He later worked in Brussels as an assistant to Mathieu Grosch, who represented Belgium's German-speaking electoral college in the European Parliament. In 1995, he was associated with Joëlle Milquet's campaign for the presidency of the French-speaking Christian Social Party (PSC).

During his time studying in England, Cormann began a relationship with an Australian woman. He first came to Australia in June 1994 to visit her family in Perth. Their relationship did not continue, but after returning to Belgium to complete his studies he decided to move to Australia permanently. He settled in Perth in July 1996, aged 25, initially working as a gardener at Presbyterian Ladies' College as his Belgian law degrees were not recognised. Cormann then cold-called Senator Chris Ellison, the chairman of the parliamentary committee on treaties, and asked to work in his office as a volunteer. After two weeks he secured a paid position as a staffer.

Through Ellison, Cormann began to develop connections in the Liberal Party of Australia (Western Australian Division). From 1997 to 2000 he worked as chief of staff to Rhonda Parker, the state minister for family and children's services. He later worked as senior adviser to Premier Richard Court (2000–2001) before returning to work for Ellison after his appointment as federal justice minister. Cormann was elected to the Liberal Party's state council in 2000. He served as a vice-president of the party from 2003 to 2004 and as senior vice-president from 2004 to 2008.

In 2003, Cormann joined HBF as health services manager in its health insurance division. He was general manager of its Healthguard division from 2004 to 2006 before rejoining the health insurance division as acting general manager from 2006 to 2007.

== Federal politics ==
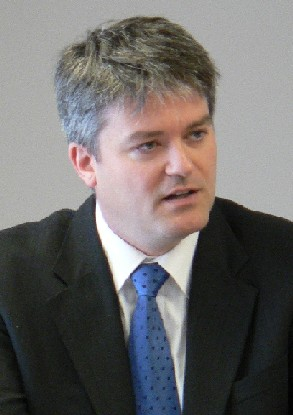
Cormann in 2007

=== Opposition (2007–2013) ===
Cormann's preselection for the coveted third position on the Liberal Senate ticket for the 2007 election was all but assured, at the expense of controversial Senator Ross Lightfoot, who withdrew from the preselection race and resigned from politics when he realised the numbers were against him. On the ABC's Stateline program on 27 April 2007, Lightfoot stated that he considered Cormann (although he stopped short of naming him) an "inappropriate person" to replace him. Lightfoot's main complaint was that there were "more appropriate people" to succeed him "who have served the party longer" and "who have been in the country longer".

When Senator Ian Campbell unexpectedly announced his planned resignation on 4 May 2007, Cormann was quickly preselected by the party to fill the resulting casual vacancy. Campbell formally resigned on 31 May 2007. Cormann was sworn in on 20 June 2007 and served the remaining four years of Ian Campbell's term until 2011. On 21 August 2010 Cormann was re-elected for a further six-year term as Senator for Western Australia and again on 2 July 2016.

In Opposition, Cormann served as Shadow Parliamentary Secretary for Health Administration (2008–09), Shadow Minister for Employment Participation, Apprenticeships and Training (2009–2010) and as Shadow Assistant Treasurer and Shadow Minister for Financial Services and Superannuation (2010–2013). In the Senate he chaired the Fuel and Energy Select Committee (2008–2010) and the Scrutiny of New Taxes Committee (2010–2011).

=== Government (2013–2020) ===
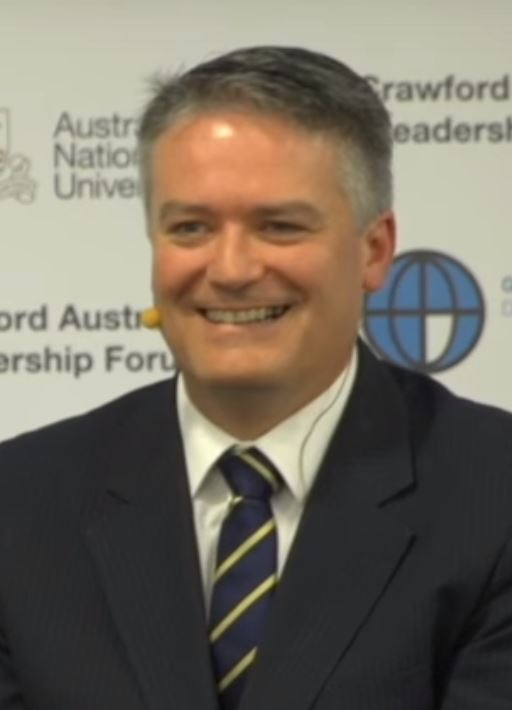
Cormann in 2016

When the Coalition won government in 2013, Cormann became the Finance Minister, a role which he held under Tony Abbott, Malcolm Turnbull and Scott Morrison. Although he publicly supported Abbott in the 2015 leadership spill, Cormann was promoted by Turnbull to take on the additional roles of Special Minister of State in 2016, and Leader of the Government in the Senate in 2017.

As government leader in the upper house, Cormann became third in line to serve as acting prime minister when necessary. He fulfilled this role for several days in February 2018, during a unique set of circumstances in which Prime Minister Turnbull made a state visit to the United States, Deputy Prime Minister Barnaby Joyce took personal leave amid scandal surrounding an affair with a staffer, and Deputy Leader of the Liberal Party Julie Bishop made official visits to Europe in her role as Foreign Minister.

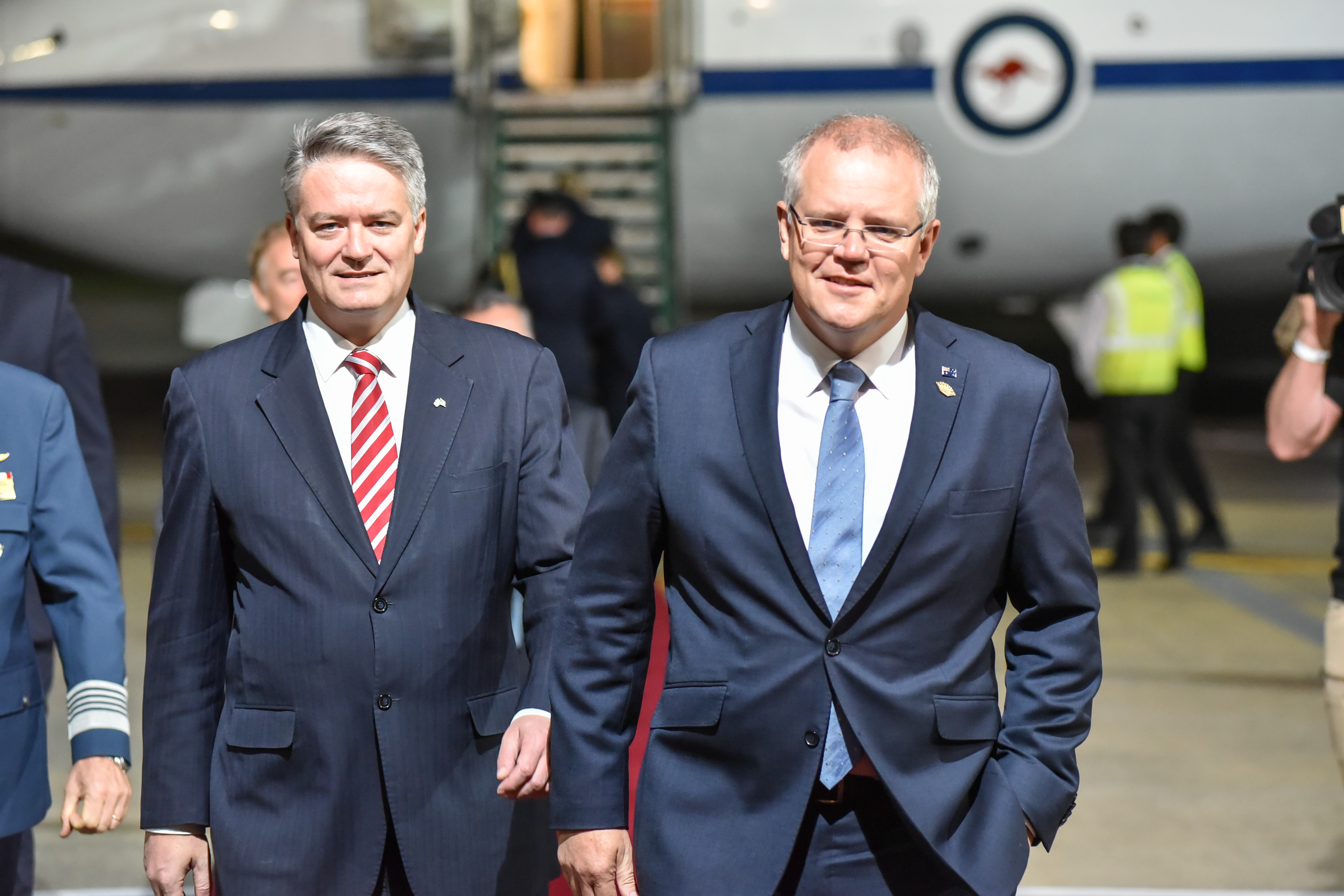
Cormann with Prime Minister Scott Morrison at the 2018 G20 Buenos Aires summit

Cormann played a key role during the Liberal Party leadership spills in August 2018. He voted for Turnbull against Peter Dutton in the first spill on 21 August, and the following day publicly pledged his support for him to remain as prime minister, stating "I will continue to serve him loyally into the future" at a press conference alongside Turnbull and Treasurer Scott Morrison. However, on 23 August Cormann issued a joint statement with Mitch Fifield and Michaelia Cash withdrawing their support, stating that "we went to see the PM yesterday afternoon to advise him that in our judgement, he no longer enjoyed the majority of support of Liberal members". They also announced that they had offered their resignations from cabinet. In the second spill on 24 August, he supported Peter Dutton against Scott Morrison and Julie Bishop.

During the leadership conflict, Cormann offered his resignation as Minister for Finance and Leader of the Government in the Senate, but resumed both roles in the first Morrison Ministry.

In October 2019, Cormann became the longest-serving Finance Minister, having surpassed the record previously held by Nick Minchin.

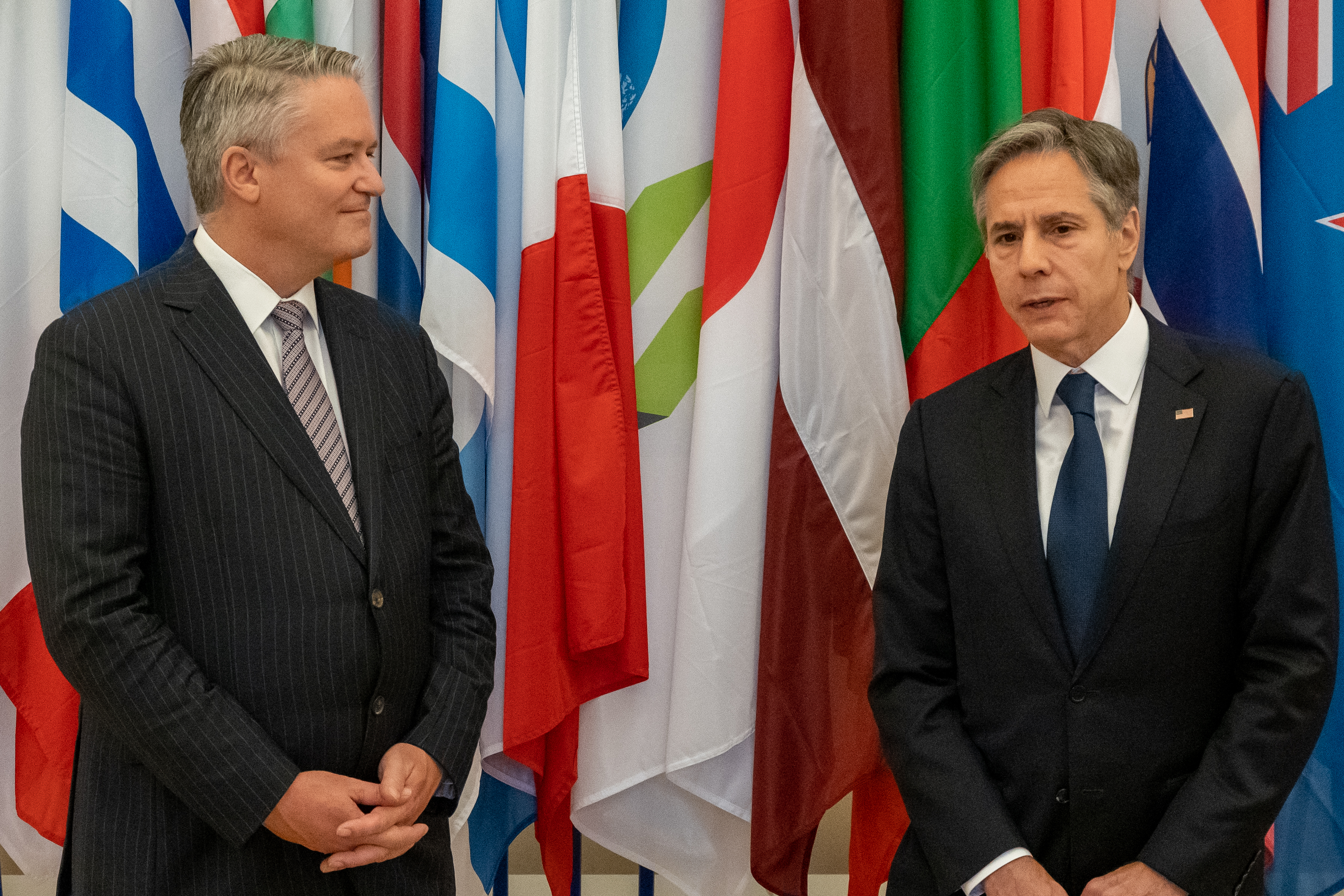
Cormann meets with U.S. Secretary of State Antony J. Blinken in Paris in June 2021

In July 2020, Cormann announced that he would step down from politics by the end of the year, but would remain as minister to finalise the government's July budget update, the 2020–21 federal budget in October and the half-yearly budget update in December. In early October 2020, Prime Minister Scott Morrison announced that Cormann would be nominated as a candidate for the next Secretary-General of the OECD. On 30 October 2020, he stepped down from his roles as Finance Minister and Leader of the Government in the Senate, which were taken over by Trade Minister Simon Birmingham.

On 2 November 2020, Cormann was officially nominated as a candidate for the next Secretary-General of the OECD. He formally resigned from the Senate a week later on 6 November 2020, with his resignation triggering a casual vacancy in the Senate. His nomination was supported both by the Liberal government and federal Labor, while the Labor Premier of Western Australia Mark McGowan provided a reference for Cormann's nomination.

== Secretary-General of OECD ==
On 12 March 2021, Cormann was elected as the next Secretary-General of the OECD, and he assumed office on 1 June 2021. On 25 June Cormann welcomed United States Secretary of State Antony Blinken. Among the issues discussed were "techno-democracy" and the COVID-19 pandemic. On 28 February 2023, Cormann visited Ukraine and met with the president of Ukraine, Volodymyr Zelenskyy. During their meeting, they discussed Ukraine's possible accession to the OECD.

== Political views ==
Cormann is a free market economic and fiscal conservative. As a Senator, in Opposition and in Government, he has been a consistent advocate for lower taxes, smaller government, open markets and free trade. Within the Liberal Party he is associated with the economic dries.

While Cormann personally opposed same-sex marriage and in 2017 argued "for a postal vote plebiscite to be held before a parliamentary vote on the issue", after that survey went ahead and found most Australians support same-sex marriage, Cormann chose to vote in favour of the bill legalising same-sex marriage.

Cormann is a constitutional monarchist. While in parliament, he was a member of the National Right.

== Personal life ==
Cormann, a Roman Catholic, has two daughters with his wife Hayley. His wife, a barrister, was appointed as a judge of the District Court of Western Australia in 2024 and previously served as president of the Law Society of Western Australia.

Cormann became an Australian citizen on Australia Day in 2000, which resulted in the automatic loss of his Belgian citizenship as per Belgian nationality law at the time. This was re-confirmed prior to nominating for preselection as a candidate for the Senate.

Cormann obtained a private pilot's licence in 2001.

== Honours ==
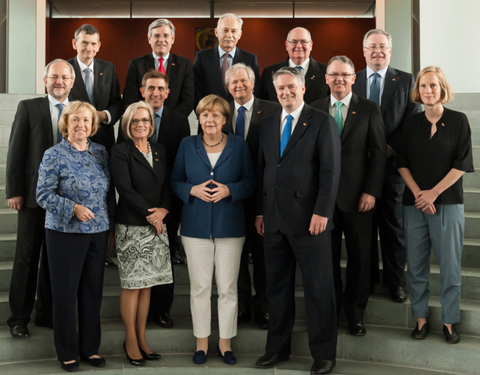
Cormann with Angela Merkel (front row) and the Australia-Germany Advisory Group in 2015

In January 2018, Cormann was awarded with the rank of Grand Cross with Star and Sash of the Order of Merit of the Federal Republic of Germany by Ambassador Anna Prinz on behalf of the Federal President of Germany Frank-Walter Steinmeier for his work "in advancing German-Australian relations".

In November 2025, Mathias Cormann was awarded the State Decoration of the Order of the White Double Cross, First Class (Civil Division), by the President of the Slovak Republic, Peter Pellegrini, in recognition of his commitment to dialogue, cooperation, and the promotion of a better world.

He was appointed a Companion of the Order of Australia in the 2026 Australia Day Honours “for eminent service to the people and Parliament of Australia, to the implementation of government reform, to multilateral affairs, and to international economic development”.

In March 2026 he was awarded the Order of Merit (Ukraine) by Foreign Minister Andrii Sybiha on behalf of Ukraine President Volodymyr Zelenskyy for his principled leadership and consistent support for Ukraine’s structural reform effort and resilience.

== Criticisms and controversies ==
During his candidacy for the position of Secretary General of the OECD, Cormann has been criticised over his record on climate change, specifically for trying to abolish Australia's renewable energy target, along with the country's Clean Energy Finance Corporation and its Renewable Energy Agency. In March 2021, 29 Australian and global humanitarian and environmental organisations wrote to the OECD, citing "grave concerns" and asking that Cormann be disqualified due to his record of "thwarting effective climate action". Among critics of his candidacy were also trade union leaders in Australia and the UK, with the UK Trade Union Council stating that Cormann's nomination as Secretary General of the OECD would set back the fight against poverty and the climate crisis.

In August 2021, it was revealed that Cormann was a member of the Clan, a WhatsApp group which was used to branchstack in Western Australia.

In January 2024, independent Australian news website The Klaxon reported that Cormann shortly after leaving parliament in late 2020 was issued equity in Sayers Group, a consultancy firm funded by Luke Sayers, former CEO of scandal-ridden firm PwC Australia. Sayers Group subsequently benefitted from a string of federal government contracts, adding up to a total of more than A$10 million between November 2020 and December 2023. When Cormann was Australia's Minister of Finance from 2013 to 2020, federal government payments to PwC Australia for "management advisory services" increased more than 17-fold – from A$5.8 million to A$101.4 million.

Parliament of Australia
Preceded by Ian Campbell	Senator for Western Australia; 2007–2020	Succeeded by Ben Small
Political offices
Preceded by Penny Wong	Minister for Finance; 2013–2020	Succeeded by Simon Birmingham
Preceded by George Brandis	Leader of the Government in the Senate; 2017–2020	Succeeded by Simon Birmingham
Preceded by Alex Hawke	Special Minister of State; 2019–2020	Succeeded by Simon Birmingham
Preceded by Scott Ryan	Special Minister of State; 2017–2018	Succeeded by Alex Hawke
Preceded by Mal Brough	Special Minister of State; 2015–2016	Succeeded by Scott Ryan
Diplomatic posts
Preceded by José Ángel Gurría	Secretary-General of the Organisation for Economic Co-operation and Development; 2021–present	Incumbent
