= David Honey =

Western Australian politician

David Honey MLA

16th Leader of the Western Australian Liberal Party
- In office 23 March 2021 – 30 January 2023
- Deputy: Libby Mettam
- Preceded by: Zak Kirkup
- Succeeded by: Libby Mettam

Member of the Western Australian Legislative Assembly for Cottesloe
- In office 17 March 2018 – 8 March 2025
- Preceded by: Colin Barnett
- Succeeded by: Sandra Brewer

18th President of the Western Australian Liberal Party
- In office 1994–1997
- Vice President: Noel Crichton-Browne
- Preceded by: Bill Hassell
- Succeeded by: David Johnston

Personal details
- Born: David John Honey; 18 April 1958 (age 68) Mount Barker, Western Australia
- Party: Liberal Party
- Education: University of Western Australia
- Website: Official website

David John Honey (born 18 April 1958) is an Australian politician who was the Liberal Party member for the electoral district of Cottesloe in the Western Australian Legislative Assembly from 2018 to 2025. He was leader of the WA Liberal Party from March 2021 until he was defeated in a leadership spill in January 2023, and was previously the Shadow Minister for Industrial Development, Water and Lands, and the Liberal Party's Legislative Assembly Policy Co-ordinator. He was defeated in preselection by Sandra Brewer, who succeeded him as the member for Cottesloe.

== Education and early career ==
Honey completed a Bachelor of Science with first-class Honours and a PhD in Chemistry at the University of Western Australia, as well as being the UWA Science Union President. He has held technical roles including as a Forensic Scientist and Environmental Scientist with the State Government, and also formed the Hydrometallurgy Research Group for Western Australian Mining Corporation.

Honey was formerly the Global Residue Manager for Alcoa's Refining operations, having overall accountability for the refining residue operations in the United States, Spain, Brazil and Australia. Prior to that role, Honey held senior management and technical roles in Alcoa. He joined Alcoa as a Senior Principal Research Scientist in the Global Refining Centre of Excellence before moving on to the positions of Clarification Manager, Pinjarra Refinery, Digestion manager, Kwinana Refinery, Production Manager, Kwinana Refinery, and Western Australian Operations Residue Manager.

From 2012 to 2018, he was the President of the Kwinana Industries Council, a lobby group representing chemical, petroleum, cement and other firms in Kwinana.

== Political career ==
From 1994 to 1997, Honey was president of WA Liberal Party. During that time, he was aligned with controversial Liberal Party power broker Noel Crichton-Browne, but when Crichton-Browne made inappropriate sexual comments to journalist Colleen Egan at a Liberal Party conference in July 1995, Honey initiated the successful motion to expel Crichton-Browne from the party. Honey later explained in March 2021, that as the party president, he had to deal with the issue of Crichton-Browne being a power broker and his "undue influence" over the party and preselections.

Honey was elected to the Western Australian Legislative Assembly in the Cottesloe by-election on 17 March 2018, following the resignation of former Premier Colin Barnett. At the 2021 state election, Honey was one of only two Liberals to hold their seats in the massive landslide victory by the Labor Party, and the only non-Labor MP from Perth. The other Liberal member, Libby Mettam, declined to contest the party leadership, leaving the position open for Honey when the party's parliamentary wing met to elect a leader on 23 March 2021. Upon his election as leader, Honey brought up his role in the expulsion of Crichton-Browne in 1995 as a reason why he should be leader of what remained of the WA Liberals, and vowed to oversee a "root and branch" analysis and restructuring of the party.

In January 2023, Honey was challenged for the leadership by Mettam. Honey pulled out of the leadership contest on 30 January and Mettam replaced him as party leader unopposed.

In February 2024, Honey lost a Liberal party preselection ballot for the seat of Cottesloe to Sandra Brewer, the head of the state's Property Council.

=== Political views ===
In his maiden speech to parliament, Honey criticised plans for higher density housing in his electorate of Cottesloe, saying that places further out from the Perth CBD should be densified instead, such as Fremantle or Rockingham. Honey said that "Cottesloe is already doing more than its fair share" and "allowing Gold Coast-style high-rise on the beachfront would substantially diminish the attractiveness of this area for residents and visitors alike, including tourists". The issue of higher-density development has come up again in late-2023 due to the preselection challenge to Honey by Sandra Brewer. Honey's opponents have labelled him a NIMBY, but he rejects the label, saying that "the term NIMBY (Not in my backyard) is an insulting slur meant to delegitimise the very real and reasonable concerns of local residents who care more about their community’s amenities and character than maximising profit for a developer".

Western Australian Legislative Assembly
Preceded by Colin Barnett	Member for Cottesloe; 2018–2025	Succeeded by Sandra Brewer
Party political offices
Preceded by Bill Hassell	President of the WA Liberal Party; 1994–1997	Succeeded by David Johnston
Preceded by Zak Kirkup	Leader of the WA Liberal Party; 2021–2023	Succeeded by Libby Mettam
