= Zak Kirkup =

Australian politician (born 1987)

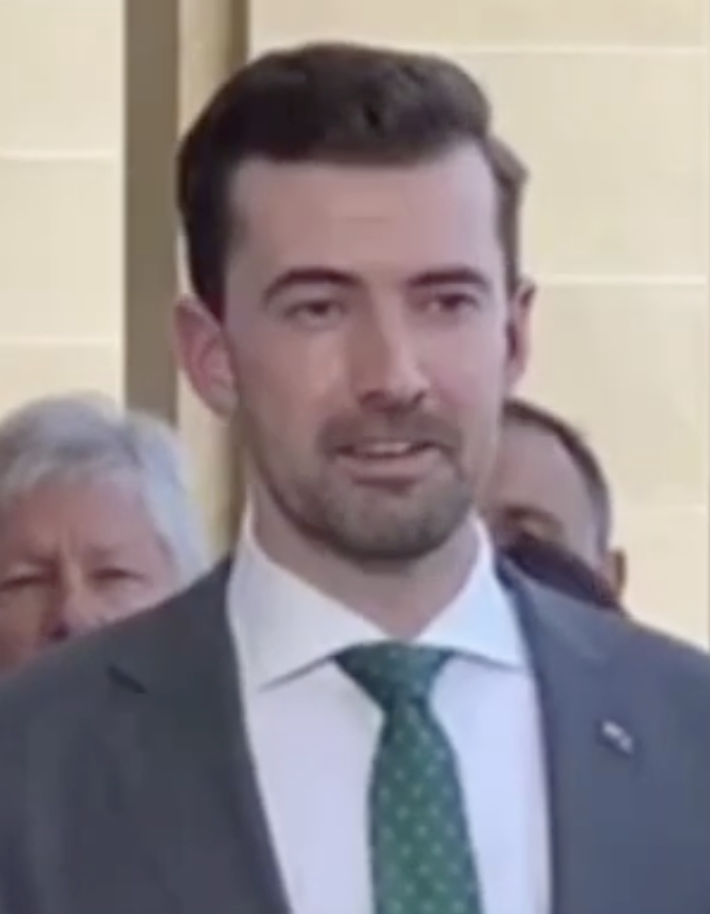

35th Leader of the Opposition in Western Australia Elections: 2021
- In office 24 November 2020 – 13 March 2021
- Premier: Mark McGowan
- Deputy: Libby Mettam
- Preceded by: Liza Harvey
- Succeeded by: Mia Davies

Leader of the Liberal Party of Western Australia
- In office 24 November 2020 – 13 March 2021
- Deputy: Libby Mettam
- Preceded by: Liza Harvey
- Succeeded by: David Honey

Member of the Western Australian Legislative Assembly for Dawesville
- In office 11 March 2017 – 13 March 2021
- Preceded by: Kim Hames
- Succeeded by: Lisa Munday
Party leadership positions
Manager of Opposition Business
In office 27 June 2019 – 24 November 2020
Leader	Liza Harvey
Preceded by	Dean Nalder
Succeeded by	Peter Katsambanis
Deputy State Director of Campaign Support
In office 2008 – 2015; Serving with Ben Morton
Leader	Colin Barnett
Succeeded by	Sam Calabrese

Personal details
- Born: 23 February 1987 (age 39) Midland, Western Australia
- Party: Liberal
- Education: Governor Stirling Senior High School
- Alma mater: Murdoch University
- Occupation: Consultant, business owner
- Profession: Policy advisor Politician

Zak Richard Francis Kirkup (born 23 February 1987) is an Australian former politician. He was a member of the Western Australian Liberal Party, and served as a member for the Western Australian Legislative Assembly for the electoral district of Dawesville from 2017 to 2021.

In November 2020, Kirkup was elected as the leader of the Western Australian Liberal Party and became Leader of the Opposition. He led the party into the 2021 state election, in which they were defeated in a wipeout loss. He made the unprecedented decision to concede defeat two weeks prior to the election taking place. He lost his own seat of Dawesville to Labor's Lisa Munday, becoming the first major party leader in Western Australia to lose his seat in 88 years. Shortly after the election, Kirkup announced his resignation from politics.

== Early life and family ==
Kirkup was born in Perth to Penni Hulston and Rob Kirkup. His mother was an immigrant from New Zealand, while his father was Australian. Zak Kirkup's paternal grandfather was Aboriginal – a member of the Yamatji people of the Mid West. He has one half-sister, who was born when his mother was 17 and given up for adoption.

He grew up in the eastern suburbs around Midland. Kirkup attended Woodlupine Primary School in Forrestfield and Governor Stirling Senior High School in Woodbridge.

== Politics ==
Kirkup worked as a research assistant to Matt Birney (the state leader of the opposition at the time). He later worked in the office of Senator Judith Adams, as a campaign officer at the 2007 federal election, as deputy state director of campaigns (under Ben Morton), and in the office of Premier Colin Barnett as an adviser on environmental issues.

In 2012, Kirkup was named and subsequently cleared in a Public Sector Commission investigation into alleged breaches of the code of ethics that binds WA ministerial staff. The investigation was triggered by an incident at a Perth pub. Kirkup was drinking with a colleague from Barnett's office who falsely informed journalists that then opposition leader Mark McGowan was at the same pub. The colleague also distributed an image of McGowan's home. Kirkup denied any knowledge of his colleague's actions, which the Commission accepted.

After the 2013 state election he switched to the private sector for a period, finding employment as a consultant with building company BGC.

In April 2016, Kirkup won Liberal preselection for the state seat of Dawesville, replacing the retiring former deputy Liberal leader Kim Hames. He won the seat by only 343 votes at the 2017 election, narrowly avoiding being swept up in the then-record statewide swing to the Labor Party. Kirkup was one of only 13 Liberals in the legislature, and one of only four from outside the metropolitan area. Dawesville had historically been a safe Liberal seat; when the writs dropped, the Liberals held it on a margin of 12.7 percent. However, it was now the party's most marginal seat, with Kirkup sitting on a paper-thin majority of 0.7 percent.

In 2020, Kirkup was criticised for his remarks on Clive Palmer's defamation suit against Premier Mark McGowan. State Government lawyers had lodged a counter claim to Palmer's action, a move intended to offset any damages awarded to Palmer. This prompted Kirkup to call McGowan "a princess" who needed to "harden up".

After Liza Harvey's resignation four months out from the 2021 Western Australian state election, Kirkup said he would run to be leader. While Kalgoorlie Liberal MLA Kyran O'Donnell publicly opposed Kirkup's tilt, citing his narrow margin in his seat of Dawesville, Kirkup said that he was "up for the fight" in the upcoming election and he stated that all Liberal policies would be under review in the lead-up to the election. At the resulting leadership election, Kirkup was elected leader of the Liberal Party unopposed.

Premier Mark McGowan criticised Kirkup and the Liberal Party of WA, stating that they remained a "big risk to the state", and that the constant leadership changes meant the party was "blowing itself up and becoming a train wreck". McGowan also took aim at Kirkup's perceived lack of experience, stating the Liberals were "inexperienced, risky and divided... We are three months from a state election and they don't have any policies. They have had four years to get policies ready and they don't have any."

By nearly all accounts, it would have been all the Liberals could do to hold onto their 13 seats, let alone pick up the 23-seat swing necessary to make Kirkup premier. Nevertheless, it came as a surprise when on 25 February 2021, 16 days prior to the election, Kirkup admitted he did not expect to win, and that all indications were that Labor would win another term. At the time, a Newspoll suggested that Labor could pick up a 12.5 percent swing. A swing that large would have potentially seen the Liberals lose all but two of their seats. Kirkup admitted the possibility that he would lose his own seat. However, he said that his main priority was ensuring the Liberals held enough seats to form a credible shadow cabinet, arguing that a Liberal party room reduced to the single digits would be in no position to stop Labor "when they go too far". The move for a leader of a major political party to concede an election before voters went to the polls was unprecedented in Australian politics.

At the election, amid a massive Labor wave that swept through Western Australia, the Liberals were reduced to only two seats. Kirkup was heavily defeated in his own seat by Labor challenger Lisa Munday, suffering a swing of over 14 percent. He was the first major-party leader in WA to be rolled in his own seat in 88 years. The last time this happened was in 1933, when Premier Sir James Mitchell was rolled by future premier Albert Hawke.

== After politics ==
Since the 2021 election, Kirkup has moved to Subiaco, Western Australia. In around May 2021, Kirkup co-founded Kolbang Pty. Ltd., an Aboriginal-operated electrical contracting business. He later became the business editor of the National Indigenous Times.

== Personal life ==
Kirkup married in February 2018, but separated from his wife in October 2019.

In December 2020, Kirkup revealed that he had been diagnosed with depression during the previous summer and had subsequently undergone treatment. Kirkup said that if people are "worried about the fact that that might make me a worse or better leader, I can promise you I understand the emotions that I've experienced, and I've got help and I've got through it."

Conflict of interests concerns were raised over Kirkup's relationship with Jenna Clarke, the assistant editor of The West Australian. Kirkup said that "those issues have been dealt with from a conflict of interest perspective now... between Jenna and her bosses over at Seven West."

== See also ==
- List of Indigenous Australian politicians

Western Australian Legislative Assembly
Preceded by Kim Hames	Member for Dawesville; 2017–2021	Succeeded by Lisa Munday
Party political offices
Preceded by Liza Harvey	Leader of the Liberal Party in Western Australia; 2020–2021	Succeeded by David Honey
