= Leader of the Opposition (Western Australia) =

Australian politician

Leader of the Opposition in Western Australia

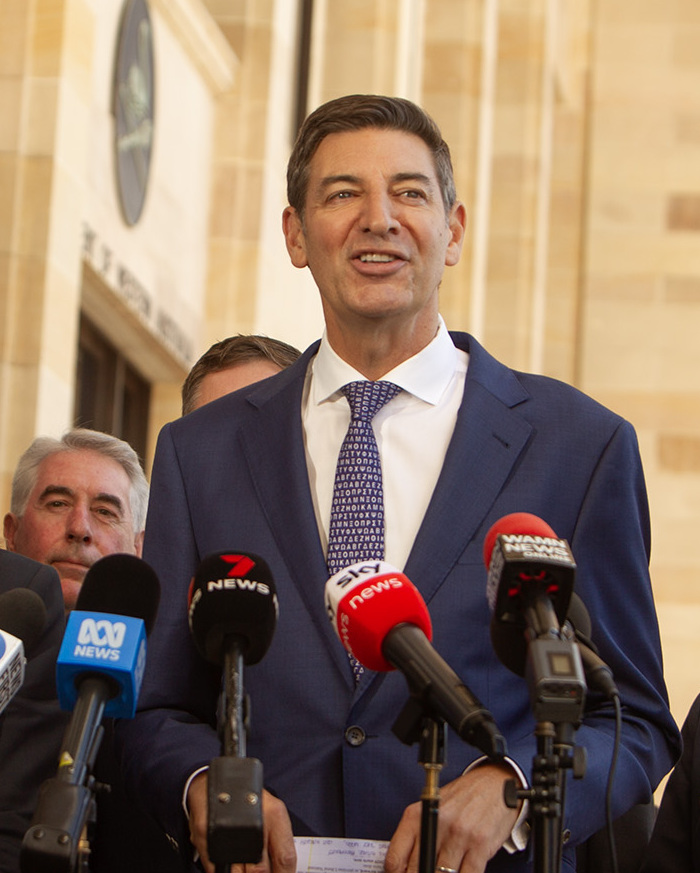
- Incumbent; Basil Zempilas since 25 March 2025
- Term length: While leader of the largest political party in the Legislative Assembly that is not in government
- Inaugural holder: Henry Daglish
- Formation: 25 August 1905
- Deputy: Peter Rundle

In the Australian state of Western Australia, the leader of the opposition is the leader of the largest minority political party or coalition of parties in the Legislative Assembly of the Parliament of Western Australia. By convention, the leader is generally a member of the Legislative Assembly.

Prior to 1911, the Western Australian political system had neither organised political parties (apart from the Labor Party) nor an organised opposition. The notion of leader of the opposition was well understood, however, and on occasions was applied to members. Maitland Brown, for example, was often referred to as "Leader of the Opposition" during his period as an outspoken critic of Governor Robinson's Government.

In the 2025 state election, the Liberal Party held seven seats against the National Party's six and became the official Opposition of the state. Accordingly, the leader of the Liberal Party, Basil Zempilas also gained the official title of Leader of the Opposition after he was elected as party leader on 25 March 2025.

== List of leaders of the opposition ==
№	Leader	Party	Constituency	Took office	Left office	Premier
1	Henry Daglish	Labor Party	Subiaco	25 August 1905	27 September 1905	Hector Rason (25 August 1905 – 7 May 1906)
2	William Johnson	Labor Party	Guildford	4 October 1905	27 October 1905	Hector Rason (25 August 1905 – 7 May 1906)
2	William Johnson	Labor Party	Guildford	4 October 1905	27 October 1905	Newton Moore (7 May 1906 – 16 September 1910)
3	Thomas Bath	Labor Party	Brown Hill	22 November 1905	3 August 1910	Newton Moore (7 May 1906 – 16 September 1910)
4	John Scaddan (I)	Labor Party	Ivanhoe	3 August 1910	7 October 1911	Newton Moore (7 May 1906 – 16 September 1910)
4	John Scaddan (I)	Labor Party	Ivanhoe	3 August 1910	7 October 1911	Frank Wilson (I) (16 September 1910 – 7 October 1911)
5	Frank Wilson	Liberal Party	Sussex	1 November 1911	27 July 1916	John Scaddan (7 October 1911 – 27 July 1916)
–	John Scaddan (II)	Labor Party	Brown Hill-Ivanhoe	27 July 1916	16 April 1917	Frank Wilson (II) (27 July 1916 – 28 June 1917)
6	Philip Collier (I)	Labor Party	Boulder	16 April 1917	16 April 1924	Frank Wilson (II) (27 July 1916 – 28 June 1917)
6	Philip Collier (I)	Labor Party	Boulder	16 April 1917	16 April 1924	Henry Lefroy (28 June 1917 – 17 April 1919)
6	Philip Collier (I)	Labor Party	Boulder	16 April 1917	16 April 1924	Hal Colebatch (17 April 1919 – 17 May 1919)
6	Philip Collier (I)	Labor Party	Boulder	16 April 1917	16 April 1924	James Mitchell (I) (17 May 1919 – 16 April 1924)
7	James Mitchell	Nationalist Party	Northam	16 April 1924	24 April 1930	Philip Collier (I) (16 April 1924 – 24 April 1930)
–	Philip Collier (II)	Labor Party	Boulder	24 April 1930	24 April 1933	James Mitchell (II) (24 April 1930 – 24 April 1933)
8	Charles Latham	Country Party	York	24 April 1933	8 October 1942	Philip Collier (II) (24 April 1933 – 20 August 1936)
8	Charles Latham	Country Party	York	24 April 1933	8 October 1942	John Willcock (20 August 1936 – 31 July 1945)
9	Arthur Watts	Country Party	Katanning	8 October 1942	1 April 1947	John Willcock (20 August 1936 – 31 July 1945)
9	Arthur Watts	Country Party	Katanning	8 October 1942	1 April 1947	Frank Wise (31 July 1945 – 1 April 1947)
10	Frank Wise	Labor Party	Gascoyne	1 April 1947	26 June 1951	Ross McLarty (1 April 1947 – 23 February 1953)
11	Bert Hawke (I)	Labor Party	Northam	26 June 1951	23 February 1953	Ross McLarty (1 April 1947 – 23 February 1953)
12	Ross McLarty	Liberal Party	Murray-Wellington	23 February 1953	1 March 1957	Bert Hawke (23 February 1953 – 2 April 1959)
13	David Brand (I)	Liberal Party	Greenough	1 March 1957	2 April 1959	Bert Hawke (23 February 1953 – 2 April 1959)
–	Bert Hawke (II)	Labor Party	Northam	2 April 1959	31 December 1966	David Brand (2 April 1959 – 3 March 1971)
14	John Tonkin (I)	Labor Party	Melville	31 December 1966	3 March 1971	David Brand (2 April 1959 – 3 March 1971)
–	David Brand (II)	Liberal Party	Greenough	3 March 1971	5 June 1972	John Tonkin (3 March 1971 – 8 April 1974)
15	Charles Court	Liberal Party	Nedlands	5 June 1972	8 April 1974	John Tonkin (3 March 1971 – 8 April 1974)
–	John Tonkin (II)	Labor Party	Melville	8 April 1974	15 April 1976	Charles Court (8 April 1974 – 25 January 1982)
16	Colin Jamieson	Labor Party	Welshpool	15 April 1976	21 February 1978	Charles Court (8 April 1974 – 25 January 1982)
17	Ron Davies	Labor Party	Victoria Park	21 February 1978	18 September 1981	Charles Court (8 April 1974 – 25 January 1982)
18	Brian Burke	Labor Party	Balcatta	18 September 1981	19 February 1983	Charles Court (8 April 1974 – 25 January 1982)
18	Brian Burke	Labor Party	Balcatta	18 September 1981	19 February 1983	Ray O'Connor (25 January 1982 – 25 February 1983)
19	Ray O'Connor	Liberal Party	Mount Lawley	19 February 1983	15 February 1984	Brian Burke (25 February 1983 – 25 February 1988)
20	Bill Hassell	Liberal Party	Cottesloe	15 February 1984	25 November 1986	Brian Burke (25 February 1983 – 25 February 1988)
21	Barry MacKinnon	Liberal Party	Murdoch (1977–89)	25 November 1986	12 May 1992	Brian Burke (25 February 1983 – 25 February 1988)
21	Barry MacKinnon	Liberal Party	Jandakot (1989–93)	25 November 1986	12 May 1992	Peter Dowding (25 February 1988 – 12 February 1990)
21	Barry MacKinnon	Liberal Party	Jandakot (1989–93)	25 November 1986	12 May 1992	Carmen Lawrence (12 February 1990 – 16 February 1993)
22	Richard Court (I)	Liberal Party	Nedlands	12 May 1992	16 February 1993	Carmen Lawrence (12 February 1990 – 16 February 1993)
23	Carmen Lawrence	Labor Party	Glendalough	16 February 1993	7 February 1994	Richard Court (16 February 1993 – 10 February 2001)
24	Ian Taylor	Labor Party	Kalgoorlie	7 February 1994	12 October 1994	Richard Court (16 February 1993 – 10 February 2001)
25	Jim McGinty	Labor Party	Fremantle	12 October 1994	15 October 1996	Richard Court (16 February 1993 – 10 February 2001)
26	Geoff Gallop	Labor Party	Victoria Park	15 October 1996	10 February 2001	Richard Court (16 February 1993 – 10 February 2001)
–	Richard Court (II)	Liberal Party	Nedlands	10 February 2001	26 February 2001	Geoff Gallop (10 February 2001 – 25 January 2006)
27	Colin Barnett (I)	Liberal Party	Cottesloe	26 February 2001	9 March 2005	Geoff Gallop (10 February 2001 – 25 January 2006)
28	Matt Birney	Liberal Party	Kalgoorlie	9 March 2005	24 March 2006	Geoff Gallop (10 February 2001 – 25 January 2006)
28	Matt Birney	Liberal Party	Kalgoorlie	9 March 2005	24 March 2006	Alan Carpenter (25 January 2006 – 23 September 2008)
29	Paul Omodei	Liberal Party	Warren-Blackwood	24 March 2006	17 January 2008	Alan Carpenter (25 January 2006 – 23 September 2008)
30	Troy Buswell	Liberal Party	Vasse	17 January 2008	4 August 2008	Alan Carpenter (25 January 2006 – 23 September 2008)
–	Colin Barnett (II)	Liberal Party	Cottesloe	4 August 2008	23 September 2008	Alan Carpenter (25 January 2006 – 23 September 2008)
31	Eric Ripper	Labor Party	Belmont	23 September 2008	23 January 2012	Colin Barnett (23 September 2008 – 17 March 2017)
32	Mark McGowan	Labor Party	Rockingham	23 January 2012	17 March 2017	Colin Barnett (23 September 2008 – 17 March 2017)
–	Colin Barnett (III)	Liberal Party	Cottesloe	17 March 2017	21 March 2017	Mark McGowan (17 March 2017 – 8 June 2023)
33	Mike Nahan	Liberal Party	Riverton	21 March 2017	13 June 2019	Mark McGowan (17 March 2017 – 8 June 2023)
34	Liza Harvey	Liberal Party	Scarborough	13 June 2019	22 November 2020	Mark McGowan (17 March 2017 – 8 June 2023)
35	Zak Kirkup	Liberal Party	Dawesville	24 November 2020	13 March 2021	Mark McGowan (17 March 2017 – 8 June 2023)
36	Mia Davies	National Party	Central Wheatbelt	14 April 2021	30 January 2023	Mark McGowan (17 March 2017 – 8 June 2023)
37	Shane Love	National Party	Moore	30 January 2023	25 March 2025	Mark McGowan (17 March 2017 – 8 June 2023)
37	Shane Love	National Party	Moore	30 January 2023	25 March 2025	Roger Cook (8 June 2023 – present)
38	Basil Zempilas	Liberal Party	Churchlands	25 March 2025	Incumbent	Roger Cook (8 June 2023 – present)

== See also ==
- Premier of Western Australia
