= Western Australian Liberal Party =

Political party in Western Australia

Western Australian Liberal Party Liberal Party of Australia (Western Australian Division)
- President: Caroline Di Russo
- Leader: Basil Zempilas
- Deputy Leader: Libby Mettam
- Founded: 1945 (old WA Division); 1949 (as Liberal and Country League)
- Youth wing: Young Liberals
- Women's wing: Liberal Women's Council
- Ideology: Conservatism; Liberalism (Australian); Liberal conservatism
- Political position: Centre-right
- National affiliation: Liberal Party of Australia
- Colours: Blue
- Legislative Assembly: 6 / 59
- Legislative Council: 10 / 36
- House of Representatives: 5 / 15 (Western Australian seats)
- Senate: 5 / 12 (Western Australian seats)

Website
- www.waliberal.org.au

The Western Australian Liberal Party, officially known as the Liberal Party of Australia (Western Australian Division), is the division of the Liberal Party of Australia in Western Australia. Founded in March 1949 as the Liberal and Country League of Western Australia (LCL), it simplified its name to the Liberal Party in 1968.

There was a previous Western Australian division of the Liberal Party when the Liberal Party was formed in 1945. However, it ceased to exist and merged into the LCL in May 1949.

The Liberal Party has held power in Western Australia for five separate periods in coalition with the National Party (previously the Country Party), with the longest period between 1959 and 1971.

The party was the sole opposition in the state from 2017 until the 2021 election, where the party lost eleven seats, thus losing opposition status to the National Party, marking the first time the party had failed to form either a coalition government or opposition on its own. Following the election, the Liberal Party and National Party formed an alliance opposition, with the Liberal Party being the junior party in the alliance, and each party maintaining their independence. The party regained opposition status in 2025 with Basil Zempilas the current leader.

== History ==
=== Background ===
Under the leadership of James Mitchell, the major non-Labor party in Western Australia had retained the Nationalist Party name even after the formation of the federal United Australia Party in 1931. After Mitchell's government was defeated at the 1933 election, the Nationalists had fewer seats than the Country Party and so became the junior partner in a conservative Coalition opposing the Labor government. That remained the case until 1947.

On 27 November 1944, a special conference of the National Party voted to co-operate in the formation of the new Liberal Party of Australia and nominated its parliamentary leader Ross McDonald and state president Jim Paton as delegates to the Albury conference. On 30 January 1945, McDonald announced that the parliamentary Nationalist Party would be known as the Liberal Party going forward.

Following 14 years in opposition, the non-Labor Coalition narrowly defeated the Wise Labor government at the 1947 election, winning 25 seats to Labor's 23 in the 50 seat Legislative Assembly. The coalition strengthened its majority by gaining the support of Independent MPs Harry Shearn and William Read. With the Liberal Party having won 13 seats and the Country Party 12 seats, the Liberals narrowly became the senior party of the coalition again, McDonald's successor as Liberal leader, Ross McLarty, became Premier.

The Country Party had undergone significant structural change after the Primary Producers' Association decided in 1944 to cease funding the party, forcing it to set up its own support structure. It renamed itself the Country and Democratic League (CDL) and retained a significant amount of support at the 1947 election, winning 16.2% of the vote and 12 seats (up 2 from 1943).

With difference in the number of seats held by the two coalition parties being so narrow, the Liberal Party sought to gain a larger number to ensure that it remained the senior coalition partner. This was made easier by the defection of the MLA for Beverley, James Mann, who left the Country Party to sit as an Independent, reducing the Country Party-held seats to 11.

=== Liberal and Country League ===
==== Formation ====
Wanting to follow the Liberal and Country League in South Australia, there had been intentions to merge the Liberal Party and CDL in Western Australia, and the idea was supported by many supporters of both parties. However, this was repeatedly refused by senior figures of the CDL.

On 30 March 1949, local branches of the Liberal Party and CDL met together in Beverley and formed the Liberal and Country League of Western Australia (LCL), in opposition to the merger decisions of their parent parties. About a month later, on 3 May 1949, the Liberal Party saw merit in the new organisation, dissolved itself and merged into the new organisation, in the hope to unite "all anti-socialist forces in Western Australia". Mann and his breakaway CDL faction also joined the new party, making the party numbers in the coalition 14-11 in favour of the LCL. The new organisation continued to desire a merger with the CDL, however, this never eventuated. Les Barrett-Lennard, the president of the CDL Beverley branch, was appointed as the provisional Chairman, and was officially appointed as the President of the LCL during the league's inaugural conference in July 1949.

By June 1949, thousands throughout the state have joined the new organisation.

Earlier in March in Victoria, the Liberals had also unsuccessfully attempted a Liberal-Country merge by forming the Liberal and Country Party with six Victorian Country Party MPs. In both WA and Victoria, the state Country Party refused to join the new organisations. However, unlike in Victoria, the LCL and Country (CDL) parties in WA continued to run as a coalition throughout the LCL's existence. The LCL in Western Australia was also different to the Liberal and Country League in South Australia, in which a merger between the conservative parties (Liberal Federation and SA Country Party) actually took place.

At the time, the LCL was not affiliated with any federal party. However, its party constitution allowed LCL candidates elected to the federal parliament to choose whether to sit with the federal Liberal Party or Country Party. In the December 1949 federal election, the LCL and CDL agreed to campaign together as a united front against Labor, with a joint Senate team and a full exchange of preferences in three seats where each party had candidates. The federal Liberal/Country coalition led by Robert Menzies won the election, winning 5 out of the 8 lower house seats in Western Australia.

==== 1950s–1960s ====
At the 1950 state election, the LCL made further gains from its coalition partner, taking another seat from the Country Party (already renamed from CDL) to take its total to 15. The Country Party lost 2 other seats to finish with a total of 9. However, the coalition was not able to form a majority in its own right, and still required the support of independents.

The coalition was defeated by the Albert Hawke-led Labor Party at the 1953 election, but the LCL remained the senior coalition partner, retaining 15 seats to the Country Party's 9. The Hawke government was elected to second term in 1956, winning a larger majority and reducing the coalition to 19 seats (11 LCL and 8 CP). Ross McLarty retired as LCL leader in 1957 and was replaced by David Brand.

The LCL-CP coalition returned to government at the 1959 election, albeit narrowly. The LCL won a net 6 seats from Labor, with the coalition holding 25 of 50 seats and the Labor Party 23, the remaining 2 seats being won by Independents. However, the LCL still had a clear lead over the Country Party, with 17 seat to 8. The coalition formed a majority with the support of Independent Bill Grayden, who joined the LCL in 1960 to give the government a majority in its own right, while the other independent, Edward Oldfield, joined the Labor Party.

The Brand coalition government remained in power continuously until 1971, with the LCL remaining the senior coalition partner during that time.

In 1968, after the election, the LCL renamed itself the Liberal Party of Australia (Western Australian Division), bringing it in line with other Australian states, apart from South Australia.

=== 1970s onwards ===
Under Charles Court’s leadership (1972–82) the Liberals returned to government at the 1974 election and were re-elected in 1977 and 1980 in coalition with the National Country Party. Court’s governments were closely associated with resource development, most notably progress on the North West Shelf gas project, and a firm approach to industrial relations and Aboriginal land disputes, including the 1980 Noonkanbah standoff.

Court retired in 1982 and was succeeded by Ray O’Connor, whose government was defeated at the 1983 election. The party then spent a decade in opposition during the Labor governments later scrutinised by the WA Inc Royal Commission.

The Liberals returned to office in 1993 under Richard Court, forming government with the Nationals. The Court ministry pursued budget consolidation and micro-economic reform, including corporatisation measures and the privatisation of AlintaGas (legislated in 1999 and completed in 2000), before losing office in 2001.

=== 21st century ===
After a further period in opposition, Colin Barnett led the party back to government in 2008 through an agreement with the Nationals, and was re-elected in 2013. The Liberals were defeated in 2017, and suffered historic losses in 2021 before rebuilding their lower-house representation in 2025.

Two leadership changes happened before the 2021 election. Mike Nahan resigned as party leader in June 2019, and was replaced by Liza Harvey unopposed, the first female leader of the WA Liberal Party.

However, Harvey resigned a year later and was replaced by first-term MP Zak Kirkup in November 2020. The Liberal Party went on to suffer its worst ever defeat in the March 2021 election, winning only two seats in the Legislative Assembly and six seats in the Legislative Council. Harvey and Kirkup lost their seats, with Kirkup being the first major party leader to lose his seat in 88 years. The two lower house seats were retained by David Honey and deputy party leader Libby Mettam. Mettam became acting party leader but declined to run for party leadership. On 23 March 2021, Honey became leader of the Liberal Party and Mettam remained as deputy leader.

This disastrous result left the Liberal Party with fewer seats than the National Party, who would become the official opposition, and it marked the first time the party had failed to form either a coalition government or opposition on its own. Under the Public Sector Management Act, the Liberal Party would not have qualified for important Parliamentary resources as a result of losing opposition status. However, on 19 April 2021, the Liberal Party and Nationals Party entered into a formal alliance to form opposition, with Liberal Party being the junior party in the alliance, and parliamentary members of both parties holding shadow ministerial positions. This was similar to the agreements between both parties when they were in government following the 2008 and 2013 elections. Unlike traditional coalition agreements, Honey did not become deputy opposition leader, with the position held by National Party deputy leader Shane Love instead. Under the alliance, each party maintained their independence, and could speak out on issues when there was a disagreement with their partner.

In January 2023, Mettam announced she would challenge Honey for party leadership. On 30 January 2023, she was elected as leader unopposed after Honey pulled out of the contest. After election, Mettam said she would curtail the influence of "The Clan", a group of factional powerbrokers within the party.

In late March 2025, following the 2025 Western Australian state election, former athlete, Perth mayor and media personality Basil Zempilas was unanimously elected party leader. As the Liberals outperformed the National Party, Zempilas succeeded Shane Love as Leader of the Opposition. In the same party room election, Mettam was elected deputy leader and became Deputy Leader of the Opposition.

== Leadership ==
=== Leaders ===
#	Leader	Date started	Date finished	Electorate	Premier
1	Ross McDonald	1945	14 December 1946	West Perth	
2	Ross McLarty	14 December 1946	1 March 1957	Murray-Wellington	1947–1953
3	David Brand	1 March 1957	5 June 1972	Greenough	1959–1971
4	Charles Court	5 June 1972	25 January 1982	Nedlands	1974–1982
5	Ray O'Connor	25 January 1982	15 February 1984	Mount Lawley	1982–1983
6	Bill Hassell	15 February 1984	25 November 1986	Cottesloe	
7	Barry MacKinnon	25 November 1986	12 May 1992	Murdoch	
8	Richard Court	12 May 1992	26 February 2001	Nedlands	1993–2001
9	Colin Barnett	26 February 2001	9 March 2005	Cottesloe	
10	Matt Birney	9 March 2005	24 March 2006	Kalgoorie	
11	Paul Omodei	24 March 2006	17 January 2008	Warren-Blackwood	
12	Troy Buswell	17 January 2008	4 August 2008	Vasse	
13	Colin Barnett	4 August 2008	21 March 2017	Cottesloe	2008–2017
14	Mike Nahan	21 March 2017	12 June 2019	Riverton	
15	Liza Harvey	13 June 2019	24 November 2020	Scarborough	
16	Zak Kirkup	24 November 2020	13 March 2021	Dawesville	
17	David Honey	23 March 2021	30 January 2023	Cottesloe	
18	Libby Mettam	30 January 2023	25 March 2025	Vasse	
19	Basil Zempilas	25 March 2025	Incumbent	Churchlands	

== Electoral performance ==
=== Liberal Party (1945–1949) ===
Election	Leader	Votes	%	Seats	+/–	Position	Status
1947	Ross McLarty	57,621	35.24	13 / 50	▲6	▲2nd	Coalition

=== Liberal and Country League (1949–1968) & Liberal Party (post–1968) ===
Election	Leader	Votes	%	Seats	+/–	Position	Status
1950	Ross McLarty	90,089	40.08	15 / 50	▲2	2nd	Coalition
1953	Ross McLarty	71,042	37.95	15 / 50	0	2nd	Opposition
1956	Ross McLarty	98,335	33.13	11 / 50	▼4	2nd	Opposition
1959	David Brand	98,335	37.48	17 / 50	▲6	2nd	Coalition
1962	David Brand	120,267	41.16	18 / 50	▲1	2nd	Coalition
1965	David Brand	144,178	48.02	21 / 50	▲3	▲1st	Coalition
1968	David Brand	141,271	44.00	19 / 51	▼2	▼2nd	Coalition
1971	David Brand	139,865	29.66	17 / 51	▼2	2nd	Opposition
1974	Charles Court	208,288	40.33	23 / 51	▲6	▲1st	Coalition
1977	Charles Court	287,651	49.35	27 / 55	▲4	1st	Coalition
1980	Charles Court	257,218	43.75	26 / 55	▼1	1st	Coalition
1983	Ray O'Connor	256,846	39.86	20 / 57	▼6	▼2nd	Opposition
1986	Bill Hassell	324,961	41.32	19 / 57	▼1	2nd	Opposition
1989	Barry MacKinnon	344,524	42.79	20 / 57	▲1	2nd	Opposition
1993	Richard Court	402,402	44.15	26 / 57	▲6	▲1st	Coalition
1996	Richard Court	384,518	39.90	29 / 57	▲3	1st	Coalition
2001	Richard Court	319,927	31.16	16 / 57	▼13	▼2nd	Opposition
2005	Colin Barnett	382,014	35.64	18 / 57	▲2	2nd	Opposition
2008	Colin Barnett	418,208	38.39	24 / 59	▲6	2nd	Coalition
2013	Colin Barnett	583,500	47.62	31 / 59	▲7	▲1st	Coalition
2017	Colin Barnett	412,710	31.23	13 / 59	▼18	▼2nd	Opposition
2021	Zak Kirkup	300,796	21.30	2 / 59	▼11	▼3rd	Crossbench
2025	Libby Mettam	428,105	28.02	7 / 59	▲5	▲2nd	Opposition

== See also ==
- Coalition (Australia)
- National Party of Australia (WA)
- Category:Liberal Party of Australia members of the Parliament of Western Australia
