= Results of the 2023 Western Australian local elections =

This is a list of local government area results for the 2023 Western Australian local elections.

== Albany ==
2023 Western Australian local elections: Albany
Party	Candidate	Votes	%	±%
Independent	Paul Terry (elected)	1,582	14.18	
Independent	Mario Lionetti (elected)	1,422	12.74	
Independent	Craig McKinley (elected)	1,268	11.36	
Independent	Chris Thomson	1,108	9.93	
Independent National	Rod Pfeiffer	1,101	9.87	
Independent Greens	Lynn MacLaren (elected)	1,099	9.85	
Independent Labor	Matt Benson-Lidholm	999	8.95	
Independent	Jennifer McRae	970	8.69	
Independent	Lindsay Dean	598	5.36	
Independent	John Shanhun	552	4.95	
Independent	Jon Doust	460	4.12	
Total formal votes		11,159	99.20	
Informal votes		90	0.80	
Turnout		11,249	38.65	

=== Mayoral election ===
2023 Western Australian mayoral elections: Albany
Party	Candidate	Votes	%	±%
Independent	Greg Stocks	3,878	34.51	
Independent	Scott Leary	2,263	20.13	
Independent Greens	Lynn MacLaren	1,765	15.71	
Independent	Chris Thomson	1,402	12.48	
Independent	Ken Kelly	862	7.67	
Independent Labor	Matt Benson-Lidholm	836	7.44	
Independent	Cheryl Kneebone	231	2.06	
Total formal votes		11,237	99.47	
Informal votes		60	0.53	
Turnout		11,297	38.81	
Two-candidate-preferred result
Independent	Greg Stocks	4,889	58.71	
Independent	Scott Leary	3,438	41.29	
Independent gain from Independent		Swing		

== Augusta–Margaret River ==
2023 Western Australian local elections: Augusta–Margaret River
Party	Candidate	Votes	%	±%
Independent	Kylie Kennaugh (elected)	1,137	26.04	
Independent	Nikki Jones (elected)	858	19.65	
Independent	Paula Cristoffanini (elected)	732	16.76	
Independent	Greg Boland	672	15.39	
Independent	Melissa Rose D'Ath	580	13.28	
Independent	Reg Gillard	275	6.30	
Independent	Diane Fisher	113	2.59	
Total formal votes		4,367	99.57	
Informal votes		19	0.43	
Turnout		4,386	34.69	

=== Mayoral election ===
2023 Western Australian presidential elections: Augusta–Margaret River
Party	Candidate	Votes	%	±%
Independent	Julia Meldrum	1,713	38.83	+38.83
Independent	Kylie Kennaugh	1,619	36.70	+36.70
Independent	Paula Cristoffanini	1,079	24.46	+24.46
Total formal votes		4,411	99.60	N/A
Informal votes		18	0.40	N/A
Turnout		4,429	35.03	N/A
Two-candidate-preferred result
Independent	Julia Meldrum	2,092	52.41	+52.41
Independent	Kylie Kennaugh	1,900	47.59	+47.59
Independent win		Swing	N/A	

- This was the first time the position of president of Augusta–Margaret River was directly elected instead of appointed by councillors

== Bassendean ==
2023 Western Australian local elections: Bassendean
Party	Candidate	Votes	%	±%
Independent	Tallan Ames (elected)	813	23.40	
Independent	Jamayne Burke (elected)	624	17.96	
Independent Labor	Ken John (elected)	600	17.27	
Independent	Hilary MacWilliam	530	15.26	
Independent	Bill Busby	515	14.82	
Independent	Jess McCarthy	202	5.81	
Independent	Patrick Eijkenboom	190	5.47	
Total formal votes		3,474	99.03	
Informal votes		34	0.97	
Turnout		3,508	29.88	

== Beverley ==
2023 Western Australian local elections: Beverley
Party	Candidate	Votes	%	±%
Independent	Dee Ridgway (elected)	484	72.89	
Independent	Darryl Brown (elected)	79	11.90	
Independent	Chris Lawlor (elected)	68	10.24	
Independent	Barry Shardlow	33	4.97	
Total formal votes		664	99.25	
Informal votes		5	0.75	
Turnout		669	47.28	

== Boddington ==
Three vacancies were not filled and a by-election was held in 2024.

2023 Western Australian local elections: Boddington
Party	Candidate	Votes	%	±%
Independent	Eugene Smalberger (elected)	unopposed		
Registered electors		1,247		

== Boyup Brook ==
2023 Western Australian local elections: Boyup Brook
Party	Candidate	Votes	%	±%
Independent	David Inglis (elected)	270	43.13	
Independent	Darren King (elected)	169	27.00	
Independent	Michael King (elected)	120	19.17	
Independent	Lachlan Chilwell	67	10.70	
Total formal votes		626	99.84	
Informal votes		1	0.16	
Turnout		627	47.75	

== Bridgetown–Greenbushes ==
2023 Western Australian local elections: Bridgetown–Greenbushes
Party	Candidate	Votes	%	±%
Independent	Jenny Mountford (elected)	467	27.12	
Independent	Mike Fletcher (elected)	335	19.45	
Independent	Tony Pratico (elected)	286	16.61	
Independent	Lyndon Pearce (elected)	280	16.26	
Independent	Trevor Stallard	130	7.55	
Independent	Rebecca Redman (elected)	117	6.79	
Independent	Elke Browne	57	3.31	
Independent	Leigh Carroll	50	2.90	
Total formal votes		1,722	99.42	
Informal votes		10	0.58	
Turnout		1,732	44.55	

== Brookton ==
Two vacancies were not filled and a by-election was held in 2024.

2023 Western Australian local elections: Brookton
Party	Candidate	Votes	%	±%
Independent	Tamara Lilly (elected)	unopposed		
Independent	Lachlan McCabe (elected)	unopposed		
Registered electors		684		

== Broome ==
2023 Western Australian local elections: Broome
Party	Candidate	Votes	%	±%
Independent	Melanie Virgo (elected)	389	21.43	
Labor	Ellen Smith (elected)	288	15.87	
Independent	Jan Lewis (elected)	200	11.02	
Independent	Elsta Foy	162	8.93	
Independent	Edward Fleming	155	8.54	
Independent	James Carpenter	134	7.38	
Independent	Gwen Knox	131	7.22	
Independent	Johani Mamid (elected)	127	7.00	
Independent	Brendan Renkin	118	6.50	
Independent	Mala Haji-Ali	81	4.46	
Independent	Jerome Herveux	30	1.65	
Total formal votes		1,815	98.64	
Informal votes		25	1.36	
Turnout		1,840	20.48	

== Cambridge ==
=== Coast ===
2023 Western Australian local elections: Coast Ward
Party	Candidate	Votes	%	±%
Independent	Georgie Randklev (elected)	819	27.98	
Independent	Michael Thomas Le Page (elected)	785	26.82	
Independent	Meg Anklesaria	499	17.05	
Independent	Anita McSweeney	499	17.05	
Western Australia	Anthony Fels	325	11.10	
Total formal votes		2,927	97.37	
Informal votes		79	2.63	
Turnout		3,006	29.36	

=== Wembley ===
2023 Western Australian local elections: Wembley Ward
Party	Candidate	Votes	%	±%
Independent	Susan Kennerly (elected)	1,126	49.96	
Independent	Kate Barlow (elected)	707	31.37	
Independent	Gavin Foley	421	18.68	
Total formal votes		2,254	97.66	
Informal votes		54	2.34	
Turnout		2,308	22.29	

== Cocos (Keeling) Islands ==
2023 Western Australian local elections: Cocos (Keeling) Islands
Party	Candidate	Votes	%	±%
Independent	Mohammed Isa Minkom (elected)	66	44.00	
Independent	Azah Badlu (elected)	49	32.67	
Independent	Osman Sloan (elected)	13	8.67	
Independent	Chloe Sykes	9	6.00	
Independent	Singa Knight (elected)	8	5.33	
Independent	Lofty Raptikan	5	3.33	
Total formal votes		150	93.17	
Informal votes		11	6.83	
Turnout		161	40.55	

== Perth ==
2023 Western Australian local elections: Perth
Party	Candidate	Votes	%	±%
Independent	Catherine Lezer (elected)	911	16.57	
Independent Liberal	Bruce Reynolds (elected)	827	15.04	
Independent Labor	David Goncalves (elected)	547	9.95	
Independent	Crawford Yorke	519	9.44	
Independent	Raj Doshi (elected)	442	8.04	
Independent	Glennys Marsdon	420	7.64	
Independent	Bronte Macmillan	365	6.64	
Independent	Will Leyland	361	6.57	
Independent	Naijiao (Jason) Bo	330	6.00	
Green	Isabella Tripp	304	5.53	
Independent	Dave Lee	244	4.44	
Independent	Shirley Vine	227	4.13	
Total formal votes		5,497	98.76	
Informal votes		69	1.24	
Turnout		5,566	33.00	

=== Mayoral election ===
2023 Western Australian mayoral elections: Perth
Party	Candidate	Votes	%	±%
Independent	Basil Zempilas	3,264	56.50	+27.06
Independent	Sandy Anghie	2,108	36.49	+26.92
Independent	Will Leyland	405	7.01	+7.01
Total formal votes		5,777	99.26	
Informal votes		43	0.74	
Turnout		5,820	34.51	−6.78
Independent hold		Swing	+27.06	

== Rockingham ==
=== Baldivis ===
2023 Western Australian local elections: Baldivis Ward
Party	Candidate	Votes	%	±%
Christians	Mike Crichton (elected)	1,777	24.43	+24.43
Independent	Kelly Middlecoat (elected)	1,770	24.33	
Labor	Lucas Martin	1,058	14.54	
Independent	Dylan Mbano	819	11.26	
Independent	Sally Davies	680	9.35	
Independent	Rebecca Privilege	674	9.26	
Turnout		7,362	30.57	
Christians gain from Independent		Swing	N/A	
Independent hold		Swing	N/A	

=== Comet Bay ===
2023 Western Australian local elections: Comet Bay Ward
Party	Candidate	Votes	%	±%
Independent	Lorna Buchan (elected)	3,333	64.68	
Independent	David Rudman	1,051	20.40	
Independent	Nic Nolan	769	14.92	
Turnout		5,198	32.18	
Independent hold		Swing	N/A	

=== Rockingham/Safety Bay ===
2023 Western Australian local elections: Rockingham/Safety Bay Ward
Party	Candidate	Votes	%	±%
Independent Liberal	Mark Jones (elected)	3,048	19.48	
Independent Liberal	Peter Hudson (elected)	2,815	18.00	
Legalise Cannabis	Craig Buchanan (elected)	1,924	12.30	
Legalise Cannabis	Rae Cottam	1,714	10.96	
Independent	Adelle Hemingway	1,450	9.27	
Independent	Kingsley Klau	1,170	7.48	
Independent	Jason Davies	976	6.24	
Independent	Davina Reid	754	4.82	
Independent	Dawn Palmer	655	4.19	
Independent	Dean Bradley	627	4.01	
Independent	Brett Garner	510	3.26	
Turnout		15,643	29.98	
Independent Liberal win		Swing	N/A	
Independent Liberal gain from Legalise Cannabis		Swing	N/A	
Legalise Cannabis hold		Swing	N/A	

== South Perth ==
=== Como ===
2023 Western Australian local elections: Como Ward
Party	Candidate	Votes	%	±%
Independent Liberal	Bronwyn Waugh (elected)	unopposed		
Registered electors		7,436		
Independent Liberal hold		Swing		

=== Manning ===
2023 Western Australian local elections: Manning Ward
Party	Candidate	Votes	%	±%
Independent	André Brender-A-Brandis (elected)	1,415	51.59	
Independent	George Watts	1,127	41.09	
Independent	Warren Thorne	201	7.33	
Total formal votes		2,743	99.17	
Informal votes		23	0.83	
Turnout		2,766	35.35	
Independent win		Swing		

=== Mill Point ===
2023 Western Australian local elections: Mill Point Ward
Party	Candidate	Votes	%	±%
Independent Liberal	Nic Coveney (elected)	1,820	63.70	
No Mandatory Vaccination	Cam Tinley	1,037	36.30	
Total formal votes		2,857	99.24	
Informal votes		22	0.76	
Turnout		2,879	37.18	
Independent Liberal win		Swing		

=== Moresby ===
2023 Western Australian local elections: Moresby Ward
Party	Candidate	Votes	%	±%
Independent	Hayley Prendiville (elected)	1,272	51.39	
Independent	Stephen Russell	1,094	44.20	
Independent	Krissy McGavin	109	4.40	
Total formal votes		2,475	99.32	
Informal votes		17	0.68	
Turnout		2,492	33.40	
Independent win		Swing		
