= Electoral results for the district of Churchlands =

Western Australian district election results

This is a list of electoral results for the electoral district of Churchlands in Western Australian state elections.

== Members for Churchlands ==
Member	Party	Term
Liz Constable	Independent	1996–2013
Sean L'Estrange	Liberal	2013–2021
Christine Tonkin	Labor	2021–2025
Basil Zempilas	Liberal	2025–present

== Election results ==
=== Elections in the 2020s ===
==== 2025 ====
2025 Western Australian state election: Churchlands
Party	Candidate	Votes	%	±%
Liberal	Basil Zempilas	12,199	43.7	+0.5
Labor	Christine Tonkin	8,049	28.8	−11.4
Independent	Lisa Thornton	3,912	14.0	+14.0
Greens	Caroline McLean	2,838	10.2	−0.2
Christians	James Rai	477	1.7	+0.2
	Anthony Fels	268	1.0	+1.0
	Tian Carrie-Wilson	169	0.6	+0.6
Total formal votes		27,912	97.1	−0.3
Informal votes		823	2.9	+0.3
Turnout		28,735	90.2	+3.5
Two-party-preferred result
Liberal	Basil Zempilas	14,153	50.7	+2.2
Labor	Christine Tonkin	13,777	49.3	−2.2
Liberal gain from Labor		Swing	+2.2	

Results are not final. Last updated on 24 March 2025 at 6:00 PM AWST

==== 2021 ====
2021 Western Australian state election: Churchlands
Party	Candidate	Votes	%	±%
Liberal	Sean L'Estrange	11,087	43.9	−9.2
Labor	Christine Tonkin	9,938	39.4	+15.8
Greens	Mark Twiss	2,640	10.5	−3.6
Independent	Jim Bivoltsis	714	2.8	−1.3
Christians	Ray Moran	394	1.6	−0.5
No Mandatory Vaccination	L. Pearce	320	1.3	+1.3
WAxit	Alexandra Farsalas	146	0.6	−0.9
Total formal votes		25,239	97.5	+0.7
Informal votes		650	2.5	−0.7
Turnout		25,889	89.0	+0.1
Two-party-preferred result
Labor	Christine Tonkin	12,821	50.8	+12.5
Liberal	Sean L'Estrange	12,413	49.2	−12.5
Labor gain from Liberal		Swing	+12.5	

=== Elections in the 2010s ===
==== 2017 ====
2017 Western Australian state election: Churchlands
Party	Candidate	Votes	%	±%
Liberal	Sean L'Estrange	12,841	54.9	−3.9
Labor	Paul Lilburne	5,310	22.7	+6.9
Greens	Joanna Gurak	3,103	13.3	+5.6
Independent	Jim Bivoltsis	1,056	4.5	+1.1
Christians	Paul Phillips	481	2.1	+0.6
Micro Business	Daljeet Gill	348	1.5	+1.5
Matheson for WA	Jack Garber	245	1.0	+1.0
Total formal votes		23,384	96.7	+0.3
Informal votes		787	3.3	−0.3
Turnout		24,171	90.0	+1.3
Two-party-preferred result
Liberal	Sean L'Estrange	14,778	63.2	−6.7
Labor	Paul Lilburne	8,599	36.8	+6.7
Liberal hold		Swing	−6.7	

==== 2013 ====
2013 Western Australian state election: Churchlands
Party	Candidate	Votes	%	±%
Liberal	Sean L'Estrange	13,366	58.99	+58.99
Labor	Patrick Ashforth	3,543	15.64	−2.26
Independent	Wayne Monks	1,828	8.07	+8.07
Greens	Cameron Pidgeon	1,740	7.68	−7.12
Independent	Elizabeth Re	1,072	4.73	+4.73
Independent	Jim Bivoltsis	783	3.46	+3.46
Christians	Pat Seymour	327	1.44	+1.44
Total formal votes		22,659	96.47	
Informal votes		829	3.53	
Turnout		23,488	91.39	
Two-party-preferred result
Liberal	Sean L'Estrange	15,887	70.16	+70.16
Labor	Patrick Ashforth	6,756	29.84	+3.31
Liberal gain from Independent		Swing	+70.16	

=== Elections in the 2000s ===
==== 2008 ====
2008 Western Australian state election: Churchlands
Party	Candidate	Votes	%	±%
Independent	Liz Constable	13,326	67.30	+36.2
Labor	Sinisa Krstic	3,545	17.90	−4.9
Greens	George Crisp	2,931	14.80	+5.0
Total formal votes		19,802	96.70	
Informal votes		676	3.30	
Turnout		20,478	87.52	
Two-candidate-preferred result
Independent	Liz Constable	14,549	73.47	+4.7
Labor	Sinisa Krstic	5,253	26.53	−4.7
Independent hold		Swing	+4.7	

==== 2005 ====
2005 Western Australian state election: Churchlands
Party	Candidate	Votes	%	±%
Independent	Liz Constable	10,612	43.7	+10.7
Liberal	Greg Preston	5,817	23.9	−5.7
Labor	Tony Walker	5,335	22.0	−0.7
Greens	Sonja Lundie-Jenkins	1,851	7.6	+0.9
Christian Democrats	Jennifer Whately	684	2.8	+0.8
Total formal votes		24,299	96.9	+0.1
Informal votes		780	3.1	−0.1
Turnout		25,079	89.90	
Two-candidate-preferred result
Independent	Liz Constable	17,387	71.6	+0.7
Labor	Tony Walker	6,903	28.4	+28.4
Independent hold		Swing	+0.7	

==== 2001 ====
2001 Western Australian state election: Churchlands
Party	Candidate	Votes	%	±%
Independent	Liz Constable	9,814	46.6	−36.6
Liberal	Marlene Anderton	5,583	26.5	+26.5
Labor	David Michael	3,437	16.3	−0.5
Greens	Candice Heedes	1,229	5.8	+5.8
Christian Democrats	Mary Minorgan	594	2.8	+2.8
Democrats	Christine Emerson	411	2.0	+2.0
Total formal votes		21,068	97.2	−0.5
Informal votes		602	2.8	+0.5
Turnout		21,670	91.1	
Two-candidate-preferred result
Independent	Liz Constable	14,557	69.2	−14.0
Liberal	Marlene Anderton	6,470	30.8	+30.8
Independent hold		Swing	−14.0	

=== Elections in the 1990s ===
==== 1996 ====
1996 Western Australian state election: Churchlands
Party	Candidate	Votes	%	±%
Independent	Liz Constable	17,254	83.2	+35.6
Labor	Geoffrey Baker	3,478	16.8	+10.0
Total formal votes		20,732	97.7	+0.0
Informal votes		492	2.3	−0.0
Turnout		21,224	89.7	
Independent hold		Swing	+5.1	
