= Electoral results for the district of Floreat =

This is a list of electoral results for the Electoral district of Floreat in Western Australian elections.

== Members for Floreat ==
Member	Party	Term
Andrew Mensaros	Liberal	1968–1991
Liz Constable	Independent	1991–1996

== Election results ==
=== Elections in the 1990s ===
1993 Western Australian state election: Floreat
Party	Candidate	Votes	%	±%
Independent	Liz Constable	11,298	57.9	+57.9
Liberal	Douglas Jecks	7,127	36.5	−26.8
Greens	Geoffrey Dodson	786	4.0	+4.0
Democrats	Noreen O'Connor	300	1.5	−4.4
Total formal votes		19,511	98.0	+2.0
Informal votes		399	2.0	−2.0
Turnout		19,910	95.1	+3.5
Two-candidate-preferred result
Independent	Liz Constable	12,251	62.8	+62.8
Liberal	Douglas Jecks	7,260	37.2	−33.1
Independent hold		Swing	+62.8	

1991 Floreat state by-election
Party	Candidate	Votes	%	±%
Independent	Liz Constable	8,358	49.0	+49.0
Liberal	Michael Huston	6,302	37.0	−26.3
Greens	John White	932	5.5	+5.5
Independent	Barbara Churchward	663	3.9	+3.9
Independent	Geoffrey McPhee	323	1.9	+1.9
Independent	Paul Cribbon	292	1.7	+1.7
Independent	Alfred Bussell	95	0.6	+0.6
Grey Power	Jane King	86	0.5	−7.6
Total formal votes		17,050	97.5	+1.5
Informal votes		436	2.5	−1.5
Turnout		17,486	82.9	−8.7
Two-candidate-preferred result
Independent	Liz Constable	10,049	58.9	+58.9
Liberal	Michael Huston	7,001	41.1	−29.2
Independent gain from Liberal		Swing	N/A	

=== Elections in the 1980s ===
1989 Western Australian state election: Floreat
Party	Candidate	Votes	%	±%
Liberal	Andrew Mensaros	11,840	63.3	−1.6
Labor	Clyde Bevan	4,242	22.7	−12.0
Grey Power	Jane King	1,520	8.1	+8.1
Democrats	Georgina Beaumont	1,110	5.9	+5.9
Total formal votes		18,712	96.0	
Informal votes		783	4.0	
Turnout		19,495	91.6	
Two-party-preferred result
Liberal	Andrew Mensaros	13,150	70.3	+5.2
Labor	Clyde Bevan	5,562	29.7	−5.2
Liberal hold		Swing	+5.2	

1986 Western Australian state election: Floreat
Party	Candidate	Votes	%	±%
Liberal	Andrew Mensaros	11,473	64.6	+10.0
Labor	Ian Bacon	6,289	35.4	−0.1
Total formal votes		17,762	97.8	−0.4
Informal votes		399	2.2	+0.4
Turnout		18,161	91.9	+2.8
Liberal hold		Swing	+5.0	

1983 Western Australian state election: Floreat
Party	Candidate	Votes	%	±%
Liberal	Andrew Mensaros	8,894	54.6	
Labor	Peter Keating	5,772	35.5	
Independent	Robert Ward	1,608	9.9	
Total formal votes		16,274	98.2	
Informal votes		298	1.8	
Turnout		16,572	89.1	
Two-party-preferred result
Liberal	Andrew Mensaros	9,699	59.6	
Labor	Peter Keating	6,575	40.4	
Liberal hold		Swing		

1980 Western Australian state election: Floreat
Party	Candidate	Votes	%	±%
Liberal	Andrew Mensaros	9,188	64.4	−6.8
Labor	Dorothy Anderson	3,658	25.6	+1.6
Democrats	Desmond Wooding	1,422	10.0	+10.0
Total formal votes		14,268	98.1	−0.3
Informal votes		276	1.9	+0.3
Turnout		14,544	91.0	−1.7
Two-party-preferred result
Liberal	Andrew Mensaros	9,899	69.4	−4.2
Labor	Dorothy Anderson	4,369	30.6	+4.2
Liberal hold		Swing	−4.2	

=== Elections in the 1970s ===
1977 Western Australian state election: Floreat
Party	Candidate	Votes	%	±%
Liberal	Andrew Mensaros	10,101	71.2	
Labor	Hilary Snell	3,404	24.0	
Independent	Frank Parry	675	4.8	
Total formal votes		14,180	98.4	
Informal votes		228	1.6	
Turnout		14,408	92.7	
Two-party-preferred result
Liberal	Andrew Mensaros	10,439	73.6	+9.8
Labor	Hilary Snell	3,741	26.4	−9.8
Liberal hold		Swing	+9.8	

1974 Western Australian state election: Floreat
Party	Candidate	Votes	%	±%
Liberal	Andrew Mensaros	8,407	56.6	
Labor	Peter Coyle	5,012	33.8	
National Alliance	Peter McGowan	1,421	9.6	
Total formal votes		14,840	97.6	
Informal votes		366	2.4	
Turnout		15,206	91.4	
Two-party-preferred result
Liberal	Andrew Mensaros	9,615	64.8	
Labor	Peter Coyle	5,225	35.2	
Liberal hold		Swing		

1971 Western Australian state election: Floreat
Party	Candidate	Votes	%	±%
Liberal	Andrew Mensaros	5,786	47.7	+2.0
Labor	Leslie Park	3,326	27.4	−4.8
Independent	Joan Watters	2,056	17.0	+17.0
Democratic Labor	Bernard Flanagan	954	7.9	+0.1
Total formal votes		12,122	97.8	−0.4
Informal votes		273	2.2	+0.4
Turnout		12,395	90.6	−1.5
Two-party-preferred result
Liberal	Andrew Mensaros	7,574	62.5	−2.1
Labor	Leslie Park	4,548	37.5	+2.1
Liberal hold		Swing	−2.1	

=== Elections in the 1960s ===
1968 Western Australian state election: Floreat
Party	Candidate	Votes	%	±%
Liberal and Country	Andrew Mensaros	4,938	45.7	
Labor	Lyla Elliott	3,474	32.2	
Country	George Gummow	1,546	14.3	
Democratic Labor	Bernard Flanagan	839	7.8	
Total formal votes		10,797	98.2	
Informal votes		199	1.8	
Turnout		10,996	92.1	
Two-party-preferred result
Liberal and Country	Andrew Mensaros	6,977	64.6	
Labor	Lyla Elliott	3,820	35.4	
Liberal and Country hold		Swing		
