= 2021 Perth City Council election =

2021 local elections in Perth, Australia

← 2020	16 October 2021	2023 →
- Turnout: 28.55%

The 2021 Perth City Council election was held on 16 October 2021 to elect four councillors to the City of Perth. The election was held as part of the statewide local elections in Western Australia.

No election for lord mayor was held, as the term of incumbent Basil Zempilas did not expire until 2023. Four other councillors were also not up for election.

This was the final Perth City Council election to use first-past-the-post.

== Results ==
2021 Western Australian local elections: Perth
Party	Candidate	Votes	%	±%
Independent	Liam Gobbert (elected)	1,793	10.82	
Independent Labor	Clyde Bevan (elected)	1,705	10.29	
Independent Liberal	Brent Fleeton (elected)	1,654	9.98	
Independent Labor	Viktor Andrew Ko (elected)	1,303	7.87	
Independent	Raj Doshi	1,291	7.79	
Independent	Steve Hasluck	1,179	7.12	
Independent Liberal	Bruce Reynolds	1,030	6.22	
Independent Liberal	Kylee Veskovich	954	5.76	
Independent	Deni Symonds	948	5.72	
Independent	Jeff Broun	873	5.27	
Independent	Cath Hewitt	728	4.39	
Independent	Gloria Zhang	720	4.35	
Independent	Andrew Toulalan	648	3.91	
Independent	Daniel Ortlepp	635	3.83	
Independent	Michelle Rosenberg	621	3.75	
Independent	Jackie McKay	483	2.92	
Total formal votes		4,629	99.32	
Informal votes		32	0.68	
Turnout		4,661	28.55	
