= 2020 Perth City Council election =

- 17 October 2020
- Turnout: 41.29%
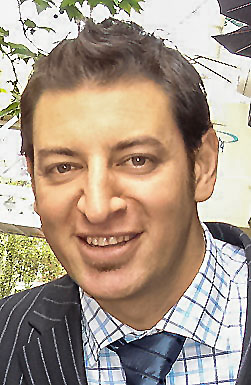
| | First party | Second party | Third party |
|---|---|---|---|
| | | IND | IND |
| Candidate | Basil Zempilas | Di Bain | Brodie McCulloch |
| Party | Independent | Independent | Independent |
| Popular vote | 1,855 | 1,571 | 786 |
| Percentage | 29.44% | 24.94% | 12.48% |
| Swing | ▲29.44 | ▲24.94 | ▲12.48 |
Lord Mayor before election
Lisa Scaffidi
Independent
Subsequent Lord Mayor
Basil Zempilas
Independent

The 2020 Perth City Council election was held on 17 October 2020 to elect a lord mayor and eight councillors to the City of Perth, a local government area of Western Australia.

These were the first elections for the council in over two years, after it was suspended in March 2018 due to issues arising from the behaviour of councillors.

Media personality Basil Zempilas was elected lord mayor for a three-year term. Four of the eight councillors were elected for a one-year term until the 2021 election, while the other four were elected until 2023.

== Background ==
Beginning on 2 March 2018, the council was managed by a panel of three Commissioners appointed by the Government of Western Australia, pending the results of a thrice-extended two-year inquiry into the activities of the suspended council. The report containing 250 findings and 341 recommendations, including suspected criminal behavior involving 23 individuals was released to the West Australian Parliament in August 2020. However, no single prosecution resulted. Police charged a councillor and his family with various offences but the charges were subsequently dropped. No apology or retraction was ever issued by authorities, despite the signal failure of the widely publicised "referrals" to result in further action.

The elected City of Perth comprises eight councillors elected proportionally, with no divisions into wards. Excepting the 2020 election, usually councillors are elected for a fixed four-year term of office. Elections are held every two years on the third Saturday in October, with (usually) four councillors elected for a four-year term at each election. The Lord Mayor is (usually) directly elected for a four-year term, with the Deputy Lord Mayor elected for two years by the councillors at the first meeting of the council.

=== Council composition (at time of suspension) ===
The Lord Mayor was elected in October 2015 and, pending the results of the public inquiry, all Councillors' terms expired in October 2019. The makeup of the council at the time of its suspension, in order of election and term, is as follows:

| Seat | Councillor | Party | Notes |
|---|---|---|---|
| Lord Mayor | Lisa Scaffidi | Independent | First female Lord Mayor of Perth |
| 2015–2019 | Janet Davidson | Independent | |
| 2015–2019 | Jim Adamos | Independent | |
| 2015–2019 | Jemma Green | Independent | Deputy Lord Mayor 2017– |
| 2015–2019 | Lily Chen | Independent | |
| 2017–2021 | Steve Hasluck | Independent | |
| 2017–2021 | James Limnios | Independent | Deputy Lord Mayor 2015–2017 |
| 2017–2021 | Lexi Barton | Independent | |
| 2017–2021 | Reece Harley | Independent | |

=== Commissioner-led council ===
| Commissioner | | Term | Notes |
|---|---|---|---|
| Chair Commissioner | Eric Lumsden | 2 March 2018 – 9 August 2019 | Chairperson of the Western Australian Planning Commission. |
| Chair Commissioner | Andrew Hammond | 9 August 2019 – 19 October 2020 | Commissioner 2018–2019. Former chief executive officer, City of Rockingham. |
| Deputy Chair Commissioner | Gaye McMath | 2 March 2018 – 19 October 2020 | Former executive director, Perth Education City. |
| Commissioner | Len Kosova | 9 August 2019 – 19 October 2020 | Former chief executive officer, City of Vincent. |
| CEO | | Term | Notes |
| Martin Mileham | | 1 September 2016 – 29 October 2018 | |
| Murray Jorgensen OAM JP (acting) | | 13 November 2018 – 4 August 2020 | |
| Michelle Reynolds | | 4 August 2020 – 19 October 2020 | |

== Campaign ==
Six candidates nominated for the position of Lord Mayor. They were media personality Basil Zempilas, retired magistrate Tim Schwass, former Australian Broadcasting Corporation journalist Di Bain, TV reporter Mark Gibson, startup community entrepreneur Brodie McCulloch and architect Sandy Anghie. Two candidates for the position of Lord Mayor also nominated as Council Candidates, Di Bain and Sandy Angie.

Homelessness, governance, reinvigorating retail spaces and creating a sustainable city are key platforms on which candidates are campaigning on.

Zempilas has faced public scrutiny over his potential conflicts of interests after radio interviews by Russell Woolf on ABC Radio and Gareth Parker on Radio 6PR. Bain released a list of potential conflicts in the City of Perth connected to her or her husband amounting to $95.75 million, including a private equity firm that owns a suite of buildings in the CBD. McCulloch's company Spacecubed has refused a $15,000 City of Perth economic development grant awarded before his campaign announcement citing it as an example of strong governance and decision making.

Zempilas was elected Lord Mayor with 29.44% of the popular vote with 41% turnout.
