= Thomas Wardle =

Australian politician

Sir Thomas Edward Wardle (born 1912 in West Leederville, Western Australia, died in 1997) was a businessman and supermarket proprietor from Western Australia. He was best known for his "Tom the Cheap" supermarket chain as well as revolutionising grocery shopping in the state.

Wardle was a popular Lord Mayor of Perth from 1967 to 1972.

== Early years ==
Wardle's father, Walter Wardle, was born in Auckland New Zealand and arrived in Western Australia in 1890. Walter worked as a valuer and later as a branch manager at the Rural and Industries Bank of Western Australia. Tom was one of five children of Walter and his wife and the family lived in a number of towns in the south-west of WA. He attended schools at Albany, Katanning and Tambellup, and in Perth at Thomas Street School and Perth Boys School.

His mother died while he was in high school. In 1927 at the age of 15, Wardle started his working career at the National Bank. In February 1941, aged 28, he was charged with stealing £162/8/- from the bank's Merredin branch. He made full restitution of the money, which influenced a judge to impose a suspended sentence on a bond of £100. About the time of the theft, he was engaged in a romance with his sister's Swedish-born friend Hulda Olson, whom he married on 31 August 1940.

Wardle joined the Citizens Military Force and in 1942 enlisted for overseas service, leaving his wife and newly born daughter Dianne behind with his parents-in-law. He was discharged from the army in early 1946 as a staff sergeant, having seen action against the Japanese in an anti-aircraft unit in New Guinea and Malaya.

Their second child, Geoffrey, was born in October 1946, the same year Tom and Hulda opened a corner-store grocery in rented premises in Fitzgerald Street, North Perth steadily building the business and good will. They purchased the property in 1952.

While holidaying in Sweden with his wife in 1955, Wardle observed developments in northern European supermarket retailing. They were moving away from shop-counter service to a system that allowed shoppers to browse aisles of produce at their leisure. He saw greater competition between retailers, unlike the resale price maintenance regime which seemed to exist in Australia. He later spoke of the mark-ups from local supermarket chains such as Freecorns, Charlie Carters and Tom Wills:

There's no doubt that their [the grocery groups'] mark-ups were exorbitant and bloody greedy ... they averaged 25 to 30 per cent and in some cases were as high as 100 per cent. The shopper was held to ransom.

== Tom the Cheap ==
In early 1956 he sold the Fitzgerald Street shop and rented larger premises on Charles Street. After fitting it out himself with a self-service supermarket layout, he soon opened under a red on white sign displaying "Tom the Cheap". His business model was essentially discounted trading margins and a no-frills service— he applied a 10% markup as opposed to the standard 25% from his competitors. Old and new customers soon flocked to the store, attracted by his shop-wide discounts, which undercut his opposition.

High turnover returned good profits and soon Wardle embarked on a dramatic and highly successful expansion programme. In late 1957 he opened his second store in Wembley and others in Scarborough, Bedford Park, Osborne Park and Mount Lawley in 1958. In 1960, he opened country stores in Geraldton and Kalgoorlie.

The rapidly expanding chain was initially boycotted by the supplier and large grocery cartels, and he often had to bring produce from interstate and purchase from other grocers. Despite the difficulties, the innovative marketing proved highly successful and the expansion continued at a phenomenal rate. By December 1961 there were 39 metropolitan Perth stores and seven country stores. He had a staff of 300 and a turnover of £3,500,000 per annum, equivalent to $113,880,000 in 2022. Soon after, four stores in South Australia opened and one in Mentone, Victoria. The South Australian stores were a joint venture with Frederick Fairthorne who owned 49% of the chain in SA.

In June 1965, he had 90 Western Australian stores, 24 in South Australia, 14 in Melbourne and 2 in Sydney. Total annual turnover exceeded £14,500,000, equivalent to $442,120,000 in 2022. Net profit in Western Australia was more than £325,000 per annum, equivalent to $9,910,000 in 2022.

He operated six "Tom's Other Stores", which sold electrical appliances, drapery, clothing and furniture. Wardle was now the fourth largest grocery retailer in Australia, behind Woolworths, Coles and Moran & Cato. Unlike many of the larger chains, most of Tom the Cheap stores, with the exception of the South Australian company, were owned by the family company T. E. Wardle Pty Ltd. Until 1963, all stores were rented rather than in purchased premises.

By 1969, he had 185 stores across Australia and turnover was in excess of £200 million per annum, equivalent to $2.69418×10^{9} in 2022. In 1971 he acquired the John Cade stores, making a 208 store-strong retail empire that was barely 15 years old.

Between October 1962 and May 1974, Wardle published Tom's Weekly in Perth, a free Saturday newspaper with light local news stories interspersed with advertising specials from his stores. Between 20 January 1973 and 11 May 1974 it was distributed with the Weekend News. Geoffrey Wardle was the editor in later editions.

== Other activities ==
From the mid-1960s, Wardle began to dabble in property development. In 1965, he bought the Sandovers site in central Hay Street for £500,000, which he opened as a "Tom's Other Store", together with other sites in South Perth and Mount Hawthorn. In 1966, he bought the Capitol Theatre at 10 William Street, which was the main live concert venue in Perth and home of the West Australian Symphony Orchestra.

In 1967, he ran for election as Lord Mayor of Perth following the sudden death of Charles Veryard. Wardle stated that he "... wanted to give the people something in return for what they have done for me in business". A complete newcomer to public office, he won the election comfortably with 28,068 votes against his main rival Sir Frank Ledger's 19,339 votes. His campaign cost $25,000 and was run by the flamboyant Joan Watters. Wardle's mayoral reign happened during a period of transformation in Perth, with WA's booming resource industries feeding city property development. Wardle is said to have liaised well with premiers from both sides of politics in David Brand and John Tonkin.

In 1968, he sold the Capitol to make way for its demolition and construction of a car park and office block. He gave the profit from the sale to the City of Perth to assist in the construction of the city's long-awaited Perth Concert Hall—this was constructed with great encouragement from Wardle, between 1971 and 1973. The Wardle Room in the Concert Hall is named in his honour. In 1967, he was an inaugural board member of the Western Australian Opera Company and generously provided the company with a Hay Street office suite.

In 1968, the government of Sir Charles Court sold Dirk Hartog Island, which had until then been operated under a pastoral lease for sheep and wool production. Wardle argued that the island should be kept by the government as a nature reserve. The suggestion was declined, so the now immensely wealthy Wardle bought it for his own use as a private retreat for his family, substantially de-stocking the large sheep flock over several years.

Wardle was the state's best known philanthropist. He gave away $200,000 in 1969–70, and Stannage (1979) suggests he made bequests in excess of $1,000,000 during his lifetime, all from his personal account. Some of these included:

- He established two organisations for working mothers in Perth, and paid $500 per week for their upkeep.
- He paid the salaries of three University of Western Australia chaplains. He sponsored a medical student at UWA and he paid $44,000 to the University's Department of Music between 1966 and 1974 to assist young composers.
- He maintained a cottage at Parkerville Children's Home.
- He sponsored the annual Sir Thomas Wardle Art Prize, worth $500, and paid rent for the Contemporary Art Society.

He made countless other gifts, to schools, hospitals, women's organisations and sporting bodies.

His appointments were numerous. These included a lay directorship of the Australian Neurological Foundation, chairmanship of the Keep Australia Beautiful Council, chairmanship of the Festival of Perth Committee for 1974, chairmanship of the Aboriginal Cultural Material Committee, trusteeship of the Western Australian Museum, governorship of the Western Australia Opera Company, membership of the Australian National Airlines Commission and membership of the Australian government's Aboriginal Loans Commission.

In June 1970, Wardle was made a Knight Bachelor for "Service to Commerce and the Community". Also in 1970 the Italian Government made him a Knight Commander of the Order of Merit, the first Western Australian to have been granted this.

In 1973, he was given an Honorary Doctorate of Law at the University of Western Australia and became a foundation senator at Murdoch University.

== Later years ==
In 1972, Wardle acquired a 55% share in property investment company Westhaven Securities Limited. Westhaven raised a Swiss Franc loan valued at $1,034,000 through the Rural and Industries Bank of Western Australia to finance property purchases and in early 1977 defaulted, triggering a financial collapse of the Tom the Cheap family companies. Receivers were appointed. By mid-1978 a dividend of five cents in the dollar was declared on debts, which had ballooned to more than $9 million.

Wardle was forced to walk away from the business and with his wife became a recluse on Dirk Hartog Island. He died in 1997. Lady Wardle died in 2005.

In 2006, the island returned to government ownership – with the exception of 40 hectares (100 acres), including the original pastoral homestead – and is part of the Shark Bay Marine Park. It is run as an eco-tourism resort and maintained by Wardle's grandson, Kieran Wardle.
