= Chas Hopkins =

Australian politician and businessman

Charles Hopkins is an Australian politician and businessman. He was the Lord Mayor of Perth from 1988 to 1991.

Hopkins was elected to the City of Perth council in 1975 at the age of 26, making him the youngest Perth councillor ever elected. He served as Deputy Lord Mayor from 1980 to 1981. Hopkins was elected Lord Mayor in 1988, defeating two-term incumbent Mick Michael, and also becoming the youngest Lord Mayor. He ran for re-election in 1991, but was defeated by former Liberal Senator Reg Withers.

Hopkins again ran for Lord Mayor in 2003, his first bid for council since his 1991 loss, but was defeated by incumbent mayor Peter Nattrass. He contested councillor positions for the City of Perth at both the 2009 and 2011 elections, but was unsuccessful on both occasions. Hopkins was the Labor candidate for the federal seat of Cowan at the 2010 election, a late replacement after initial candidate and then Wanneroo mayor Jon Kelly resigned from the race. He attracted attention during the campaign for criticising the Labor government's mining tax as too tough on the resources sector, and promised to lobby for changes. He was defeated by incumbent Liberal MP Luke Simpkins.

Hopkins is a long-time office furniture and design retailer outside politics, and is a former auctioneer. He has also been involved with a number of proposed developments, including an unsuccessful attempt to purchase Raine Square in 2002, a proposed resort in Rockingham, and a housing estate in Sydney. He is the uncle of state Labor MP and former Police Minister Michelle Roberts. Hopkins was made a "Freeman of the City [of Perth]" in 2008.

He contested the 2019 Australian federal election for Clive Palmer's United Australia Party.

Civic offices
Preceded by Mick Michael	Lord Mayor of Perth; 1988–1991	Succeeded by Reg Withers
