= Harry Howard (mayor) =

Australian politician

Sir Harry Howard

Lord Mayor of Perth
- In office 1955–1964
- Preceded by: James Murray
- Succeeded by: Charles Veryard

Personal details
- Born: 20 April 1890 Manchester, England
- Died: 11 August 1970 (aged 80) West Perth, Western Australia
- Spouse: Beatrice Thelma May Tilburn (m. 1920)
- Occupation: Businessman
- Awards: Knight Commander of the Order of the British Empire; Knight Bachelor

Sir Henry Rudolph Howard, KBE (20 April 1890 – 11 August 1970) was an Australian businessman, retailer, and the Lord Mayor of the City of Perth from 1955 to 1964.

== Early life ==
Howard was born in Manchester, England, on 20 April 1890.

== City of Light ==
During his time as mayor, Howard encouraged the people of Perth to switch on their lights as astronaut John Glenn passed overhead in an orbiting spacecraft so that he was able to see the city; Perth was subsequently known world-wide as the City of Light.
