= Capitol Theatre, Perth =

Former theatre and cinema in Perth, Western Australia

Coordinates: 31°57′20″S 115°51′23″E

Capitol Theatre
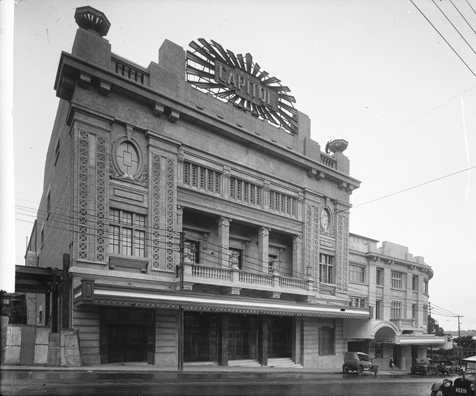
- Capitol Theatre, c. 1930
- Interactive map of Capitol Theatre
- Address: 10 William Street; Perth; Australia
- Owner: Temple Court Buildings Limited
- Capacity: 2,250 seats

Construction
- Opened: 4 May 1929
- Demolished: 1968
- Architects: George Temple-Poole; C. Mouritzen
- Builder: E. Allwood

Capitol Theatre was a George Temple-Poole designed theatre and cinema located at 10 William Street Perth.

The theatre was officially opened on 4 May 1929 by the Mayor of Perth, James T. Franklin. The opening night included a screening of Gene Stratton-Porter's Freckles and performances by the Capitol Theatre orchestra, Leah Miller's Beauty Ballet and a vaudeville act by Syd Roy's Lyricals. The theatre featured a 12.2-by-6.1-metre (40 by 20 ft) illuminated sign above its roof on the William Street facade, Art Nouveau stencil work in the lounge foyer and the upper crush area, a bust of the late Rudolph Valentino in the foyer and a 4.9-by-3.7-metre (16 by 12 ft) chandelier, containing 300 lights. Reportedly the lips on Valentino's bust were constantly red with the adoring kisses of his Perth fans. The bust is currently part of the Western Australian Performing Arts Museum collection at His Majesty's Theatre.

In the 1930s it was a popular cinema destination.

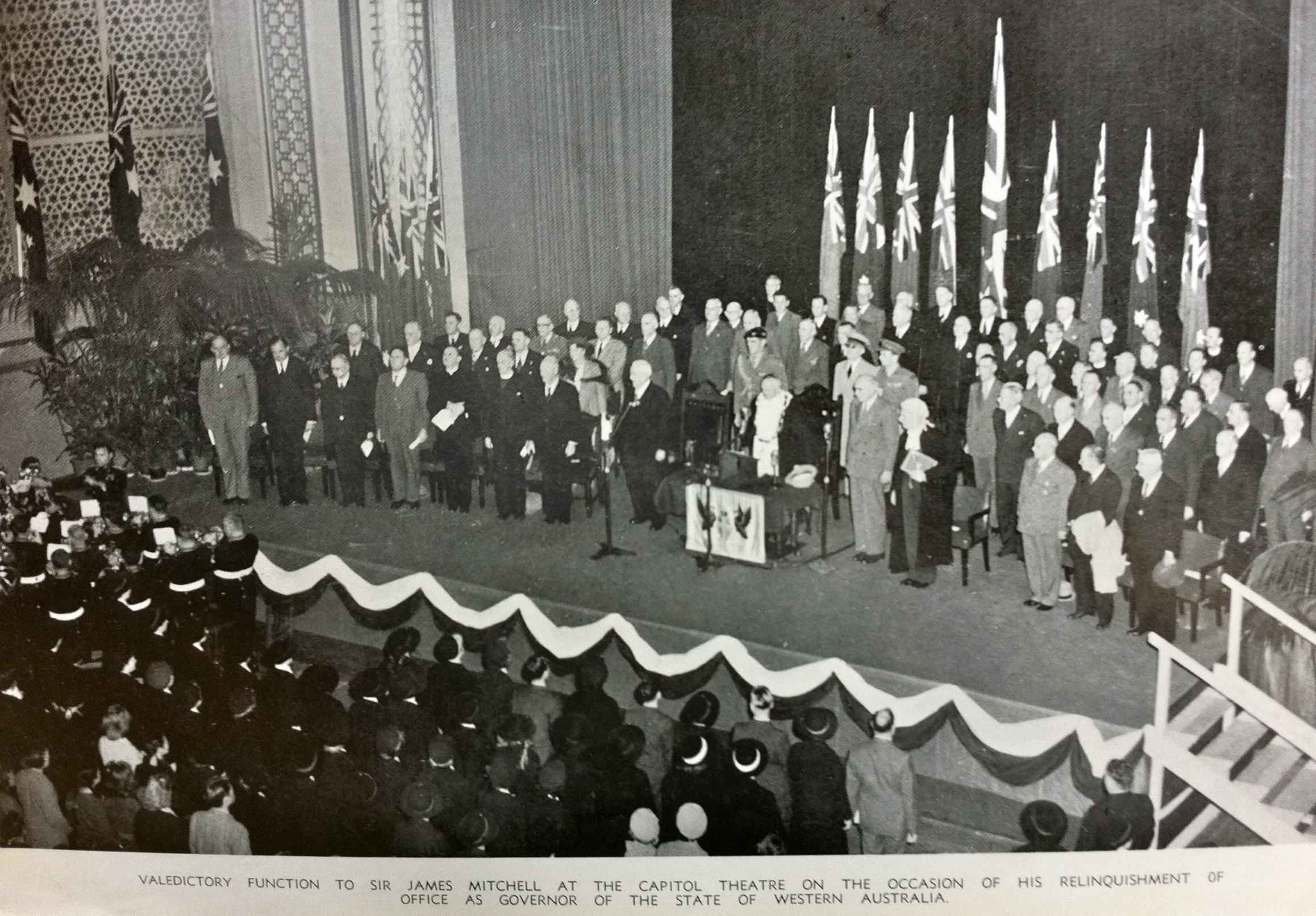
1950's government event at Capitol theatre

In the 1940s and 1950s the theatre was regularly used for formal functions relating to the state of Western Australia, and the city.

Lonnie Donegan, the UK King of Skiffle opened his first tour of Australia on 28 and 29 October 1960 at this theatre. On the bill were also Miki and Griff a UK country duo.

Entrepreneur and later Lord Mayor, Thomas Wardle bought the theatre in 1966, as a theatre and Bob Dylan performed in it on his first visit to Perth in that year. Wardle sold it in 1968 and it was demolished soon after to make way for an office building. The chandelier from the theatre now hangs in Melbourne's Princess Theatre.

Similar to the nearby Esplanade Hotel and Barracks Arch, the Capitol Theatre was demolished prior to the city or state of Western Australia having any effective heritage legislation.
