= Christine Tonkin =

Australian politician

Member of the Western Australian Legislative Assembly for Churchlands
- In office 13 March 2021 – 8 March 2025
- Preceded by: Sean L'Estrange
- Succeeded by: Basil Zempilas

Personal details
- Born: 15 March 1956 (age 70) Subiaco, Western Australia
- Party: Labor

Christine Maelisa Tonkin (born 15 March 1956) is an Australian politician, who was elected as a Labor member for Churchlands in the Western Australian Legislative Assembly at the 2021 state election. She defeated Sean L'Estrange, who had held the seat since 2013, to become the first Labor member to win the seat.

== Early life and education ==
Christine Tonkin was born on 15 March 1956 in Subiaco, Western Australia, to Haydn Joseph Tonkin, an electrical draftsman, and Irene May Tonkin (née Jones). She attended Our Lady Help of Christians Primary School, in East Victoria Park, St Joachim High School, in Victoria Park, and Kent Street Senior High School, in East Victoria Park. She studied for a Bachelor of Arts at Monash University in Melbourne, a Master of Business Administration at the Queensland University of Technology, and a Graduate Diploma of Procurement Management, at Griffith University.

== Career ==
Tonkin is an expert in public procurement reform, having worked in it for 25 years, including for the United Nations in places such as Denmark, Sudan, Papua New Guinea, Austria and Bangladesh.

She joined the WA Labor Party on 13 July 2015.

At the 2021 Western Australian state election, she was elected to the electoral district of Churchlands in the Western Australian Legislative Assembly, defeating Liberal Party member Sean L'Estrange, who had held the seat since 2013. She was the first Labor member to win this seat. Churchlands and its predecessor, Floreat (as the seat was called from its creation in 1966 until 1996) had historically been blue-ribbon Liberal territory, but was swept up in the massive Labor wave that left the Liberals with only one seat in Perth.

Western Australian Legislative Assembly
Preceded by Sean L'Estrange	Member for Churchlands; 2021–2025	Succeeded by Basil Zempilas
