= Mick Michael =

Australian politician (1922–2016)

Mick Michael OAM

Lord Mayor of Perth
- In office 1982–1988
- Preceded by: Fred Chaney, Sr.
- Succeeded by: Chas Hopkins

Personal details
- Born: Michael Agapitos Michael; 19 September 1922
- Died: 6 May 2016 (aged 93)
- Citizenship: Australian

Military service
- Branch/service: RAAF
- Years of service: 1942–1946
- Rank: Corporal

Michael Agapitos Michael (22 September 1922 – 6 May 2016) was an Australian local government politician. He was Lord Mayor of the City of Perth in the 1980s. He died aged 93 on 6 May 2016.

== Early life ==
He was born in Perth, Western Australia to Jack Michael and Ourania Zempilas, Greek immigrants. His father was a World War I veteran, having served in the Australian Army before becoming a fruit barrow owner and later a grocery shop. He attended Highgate Primary School and later Perth Boys' but left to work in the family business when he was fourteen. One of his brothers is Ken Michael, ex-Governor of Western Australia.

In 1940, Michael enlisted in the Royal Australian Air Force, serving until 1946. He was a member of 77 Squadron, and was posted to Darwin and saw the Japanese air-raids. He was trained in the RAAF as an electrical fitter.

== Business career ==
He owned M.A. Michael Pty Ltd, supplying electrical equipment to businesses in Western Australia and Victoria.

== Political career ==
He became a councilor in 1967 with the Perth City council. Michael became Lord Mayor of Perth between 1982 and 1988.

== Marriage ==
He was married twice, first to Shirley Smith in 1946 but ended in divorce in 1951 but produced a son. He remarried Adel Wallace in 1958 having a further three sons.

== Honours ==
Michael was award the Medal of the Order of Australia in 1982 for services to local government. Other honours included being made a Freeman of the City of London and the City of Perth.

The Mick Michael Reserve, on the corner of Vincent and Charles Streets in West Perth is named after him.
