= Sean L'Estrange =

Former Australian politician (born 1967)

Member of the Western Australian Legislative Assembly for Churchlands
- In office 9 March 2013 – 13 March 2021
- Preceded by: Liz Constable
- Succeeded by: Christine Tonkin

Minister for Mines and Petroleum
- In office 31 March 2016 – 17 March 2017
- Preceded by: Bill Marmion
- Succeeded by: Peter Tinley

Minister for Small Business
- In office 31 March 2016 – 17 March 2017
- Preceded by: Joe Francis
- Succeeded by: Paul Papalia

Minister for Finance
- In office 23 September 2016 – 17 March 2017
- Preceded by: Bill Marmion
- Succeeded by: Ben Wyatt

Personal details
- Born: Sean Kimberley L'Estrange; 19 September 1967 (age 58) Perth, Western Australia
- Party: Liberal Party
- Spouse: Alyson
- Profession: Army officer, secondary teacher, management consultant

Sean Kimberley L'Estrange (born 19 September 1967) is a former Australian politician. He was the Member for the Western Australian Legislative Assembly seat of Churchlands from 2013 until 2021. He was the Minister for Finance; Minister for Mines and Petroleum; and Minister for Small Business in the Barnett-Liberal Government of Western Australia. In opposition he was the Shadow Treasurer and Shadow Minister for Emergency Services; Corrective Services; Defence Issues. He has also held the role of Manager of Opposition Business and other senior Shadow Ministerial portfolios such as Health, Mental Health, and Economic Development. His career background includes being a Senior Infantry Army Officer (Colonel) and Afghanistan veteran; a business leadership and management consultant; and Senior School Economics teacher and Head of Department.

== Early life ==
L'Estrange was born in Perth and he completed his schooling at Aquinas College, Perth. In his final year he was awarded the College prize for Leadership and Service.

L'Estrange represented Western Australia at the National All Schools Cross Country Championships three times. He was also a silver medalist in the WA Debating League State grand final.

L'Estrange completed a Master's Degree of Educational Leadership; Graduate Diploma of Management; and is a graduate of the Australian Defence Force Joint Command and Staff College.

== Career ==
=== Politics and parliament ===
L'Estrange joined the Liberal Party of Western Australia in 2002 and held various pre-parliamentary service positions in the party.

In 2013 L'Estrange was elected to the seat of Churchlands in the 39th Parliament of Western Australia. The seat had been held by conservative independent Liz Constable since 1991, dating to its time as Floreat. However, it was located in the Liberals' heartland of the southwest beachside suburbs of Perth, and it was a foregone conclusion that it would revert to the Liberals once Constable retired. As expected, L'Estrange won comfortably, with 59 percent of the primary vote and 70.2 percent of the two-party vote.

L'Estrange was a member of the Joint Parliamentary Standing Committee on the Corruption and Crime Commission, Chairman of the Public Accounts Committee, Deputy Chairman of the Joint Standing Committee on Audit, and a member of the Parliamentary Liberal Party's Finance, Commerce & Development Committee. In March 2016, he was appointed Minister for Mines and Petroleum and Minister for Small Business. In September 2016 he was also appointed as Minister for Finance and to the Government's Economic and Expenditure Reform Committee.

In 2017, L'Estrange was re-elected to the seat of Churchlands in the 40th Parliament of Western Australia. The Liberal Party suffered a primary vote swing of 16 percent but L’Estrange kept his swing to 4 percent, securing a comfortable TPP majority of 63.2 percent, the second-safest Liberal seat in Perth. Following the Liberal Government's defeat, he was appointed Manager of Opposition Business in the Legislative Assembly and Shadow Minister for Mines and Petroleum; Economic Development; Defence Issues; Innovation and ICT; Science. He was also elected as Deputy Chairman of the Parliament's Economic and Industry Standing Committee. In January 2018, he was made Shadow Minister for Health and Mental Health. In June 2019 he was appointed Shadow Minister for Corrective Services and Housing and elected to the Parliament's Community and Justice Standing Committee. In February 2020, he took on the role as Shadow Minister for Corrective Services; Emergency Services; Defence Issues; and Racing and Gaming. In December 2020, he was made Shadow Treasurer.

At the 2021 election, L'Estrange was caught up in the Liberal Party landslide defeat set amongst the backdrop of COVID-19; however, it was to be a significant boundary change - removing the blue-Liberal area of central City Beach and replacing it with the Labor-red area of Scarborough-Doubleview that saw 205 voters preference flows defeat him. The seat of Churchlands remained the second best performing Liberal seat in metropolitan Perth with a winning primary vote of 44%; however, the final TPP result was 49.19% to Labor 50.81%. Only the seat of Cottesloe was retained by the Liberal Party in metropolitan Perth.

Western Australian Legislative Assembly
| Preceded by Liz Constable | Member for Churchlands; 2013–2021 | Succeeded by Christine Tonkin |
Political offices
| Preceded by Bill Marmion | Minister for Mines and Petroleum; 2016–2017 | Succeeded by Bill Johnston |
| Preceded by Joe Francis | Minister for Small Business; 2016–2017 | Succeeded by Paul Papalia |
| Preceded by Bill Marmion | Minister for Finance; 2016–2017 | Succeeded by Ben Wyatt |
