= Bruce Reynolds (politician) =

Lord Mayor of Perth, Australia

Lord Mayor of Perth
- Incumbent
- Assumed office 21 October 2025
- Preceded by: Basil Zempilas

Deputy Lord Mayor of Perth
- In office October 2024 – October 2025
- Preceded by: Clyde Bevan
- Succeeded by: David Goncalves

Councillor of the City of Perth
- Incumbent
- Assumed office October 2023

Personal details
- Party: Independent (since 2025)
- Other political affiliations: Liberal Party (before 2025)
- Website: bruceforperth.com.au

Bruce Reynolds is an Australian businessman and politician who has served as the Lord Mayor of Perth since 2025. He is formerly a member of the Liberal Party, having been an Independent since 2025.

== Local government career ==
Reynolds unsuccessfully stood for the position of Lord Mayor of Perth in the 2020 Perth City Council election, and for a position on the City of Perth council in 2020 and 2021. Reynolds was elected to the City of Perth council for a four-year term in the 2023 Perth City Council election. In October 2024, Reynolds was elected by the council as the deputy mayor of Perth, succeeding Clyde Bevan. Formerly a member of the Liberal Party and a president of the party's Perth branch, Reynolds resigned from the party upon becoming the deputy mayor as he believed the role should be apolitical.

After Lord Mayor Basil Zempilas was elected to the Western Australian Legislative Assembly in the 2025 state election, Reynolds became the acting mayor. In July 2025, Reynolds announced his candidacy for lord mayor. Reynolds was elected to a two-year term as Lord Mayor in the October 2025 local government election, beating fellow councillor Catherine Lezer. Following his election, Reynolds said his priorities were making Perth the safest city in Australia, and rebuilding trust in the City of Perth, including improving the city's relationship with the state government, which was poor when Zempilas was Mayor.

In November 2025, at the first ordinary council meeting following his election as lord mayor, Reynolds moved a motion for an independent workplace culture review, in response to 10 behavioural complaints being made to the city so far in 2025.

Civic offices
Preceded by Basil Zempilas	Lord Mayor of Perth; 2025–present	Incumbent
