= Lisa Scaffidi =

Australian mayor

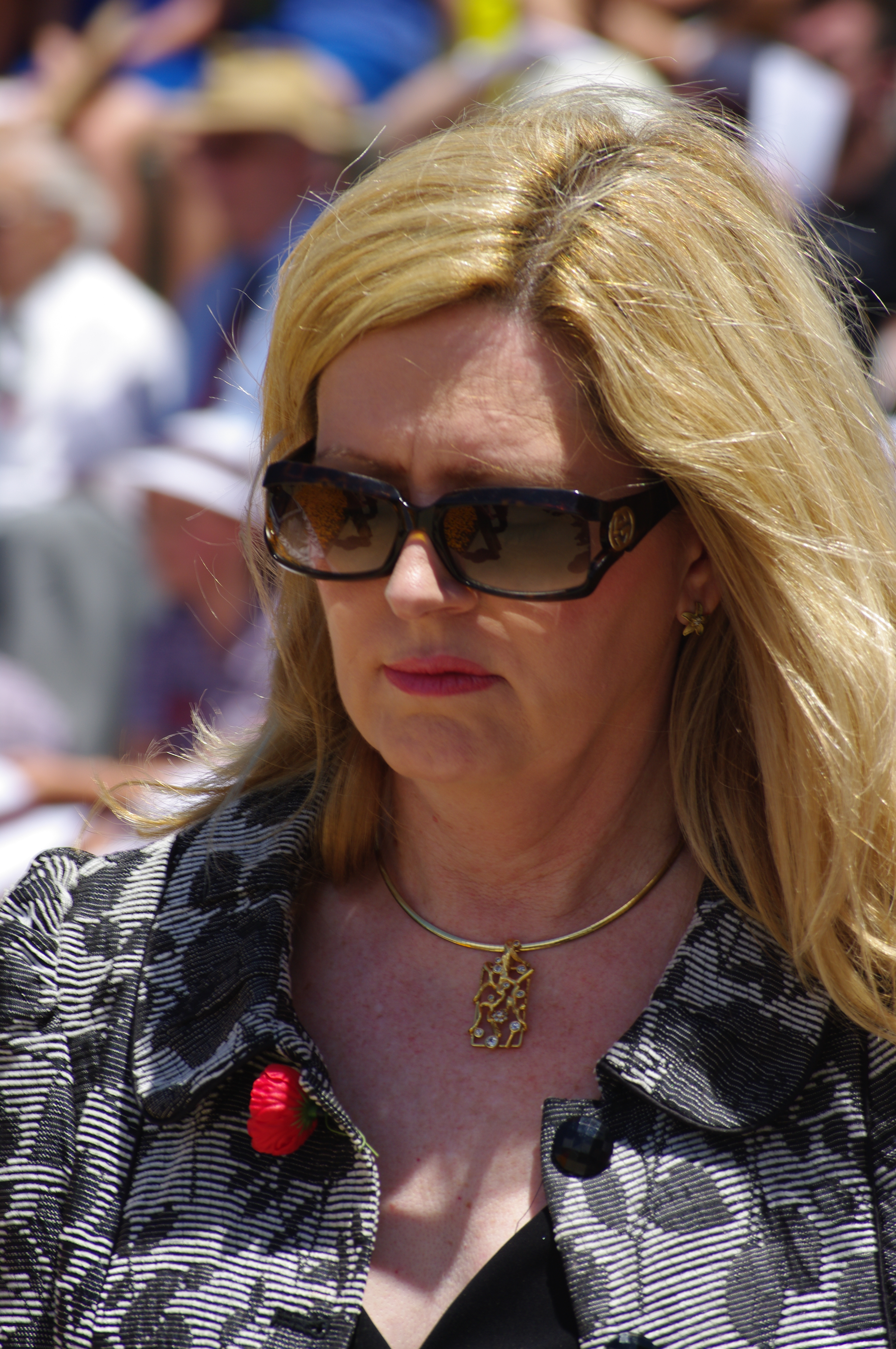

55th Lord Mayor of Perth
- In office 20 October 2007 – 19 October 2019; Acting 8 September 2017 – 2 March 2018; Suspended 2 March 2018 – 19 October 2019
- Deputy: Janet Davidson; Rob Butler; Reece Harley; James Limnios; Jemma Green
- Preceded by: Peter Nattrass
- Succeeded by: Basil Zempilas

Personal details
- Born: Lisa-Michelle Sanders; 12 February 1960 (age 66) Perth, Western Australia
- Spouse: Joe Scaffidi

Lisa-Michelle Scaffidi (née Sanders; born 12 February 1960) is a former Lord Mayor of Perth, Western Australia. The first female Lord Mayor of Perth, Scaffidi became mayor following the October 2007 council elections, after the retirement of her predecessor, Peter Nattrass, who served a record twelve years in the position. Scaffidi and the rest of the City of Perth council were suspended on 2 March 2018, while the state government investigated the council's operations regarding "serious breaches" of local laws.

== Early life ==
Scaffidi was educated at Churchlands Primary School and Methodist Ladies' College after which she graduated as a dental therapist from the Western Australian Institute of Technology (now Curtin University). She served as an air hostess with TAA in 1980, worked in the hospitality industry in a marketing capacity and, in the 1990s, helped to promote export of semi-precious stones. She was the WA State Director of the Committee for Economic Development of Australia (CEDA) for over ten years.

She served two terms as a councillor before successfully contesting the lord-mayoralty.

== Corruption and Crime Commission ==
In October 2015, the Corruption and Crime Commission of Western Australia found that Scaffidi had "signally failed in her duties" as lord mayor by accepting and failing to declare a $31,000 travel package to the 2008 Beijing Olympics from BHP, and other gifts from private companies that have dealings with the City of Perth. The commission found that Scaffidi had committed acts of "serious misconduct" but believed she had not acted corruptly.

In 2016, Scaffidi insulted journalist Liam Bartlett on social media by referring to his "bad breath and Botox" and was criticised by journalists for refusing to answer his questions about the undeclared travel and gifts while the matter was before the State Administrative Tribunal. Bartlett had earlier "gatecrashed" the opening of the A$60m City of Perth Library, a Scaffidi Mayoral project and at which Scaffidi was speaking, and had followed her with a microphone, across traffic on St Georges Tce. to Council House.

== Further investigation and suspension ==
In May 2017 Western Australia's State Administrative Tribunal ruled that Scaffidi had committed 45 "serious breaches" of local government laws by failing to disclose gifts and overseas travel. The tribunal had the power to disqualify her from office for up to five years. In the previous month Western Australian Premier Mark McGowan called on Scaffidi to step aside and stated that he would look at the means to sack the lord mayor if she did not resign. He also called on the City of Perth councillors to move a motion of no confidence in the lord mayor, however this did not occur and, regardless, such motions carry no penalty. A letter from the Premier to the Lord Mayor, calling on Scaffidi to resign, was provided to journalists prior to it being received by the Lord Mayor. On 8 September, Scaffidi agreed to step aside pending a court appeal into the ruling.

In early December 2017, the Court of Appeal set aside the Tribunal's orders, and Scaffidi announced that she would return to her statutory duties on 8 January 2018.

The Court subsequently dismissed 26 "serious breaches", noting the signal failure of the Tribunal to find according to law.

On 2 March 2018, the Minister for Local Government, David Templeman, indefinitely suspended the entire City of Perth council, including Scaffidi, while a government-appointed panel investigated its operation and conduct. The move came after years of infighting between factions on council, but not before the City's Administration wrote to the Director General of the Dept. Of Local Government, seeking urgent assistance to deal with the ongoing destabilisation and "incipient dysfunction" of Council. The panel was to make a recommendation as to whether the council should be permanently sacked. Government-appointed commissioners oversaw the City's operations while the investigation was underway. As the Inquiry took over 2 years to complete, rather than its estimated 9 to 12 months, the terms of all Councillors expired and new elections were held.

In October 2019, Scaffidi's term as Lord Mayor expired and the office was declared vacant until new elections were scheduled and held in October 2020. TV personality Basil Zempilas was elected Lord Mayor and, to date, no suspended Councillor has been re-elected to Council, despite their nomination.

| Preceded by Peter Nattrass | Lord Mayor of Perth; 2007–2018 | Succeeded by Basil Zempilas |
