= Electoral district of Churchlands =

State electoral district of Perth, Western Australia

Churchlands Western Australia—Legislative Assembly
- Interactive map of electoral district boundaries from the 2025 state election
- State: Western Australia
- Dates current: 1996–present
- MP: Basil Zempilas
- Party: Liberal
- Namesake: Churchlands
- Electors: 29,084 (2021)
- Area: 24 km^{2} (9.3 sq mi)
- Demographic: Metropolitan
- Coordinates: 31.93°S 115.79°E
Electorates around Churchlands:
Indian Ocean	Scarborough	Balcatta
Indian Ocean	Churchlands	Perth
Cottesloe	Nedlands	Nedlands

Churchlands is a Legislative Assembly electorate in the state of Western Australia. Churchlands is named for the western suburb of Churchlands, which falls within its borders, and was created at the 1994 redistribution, replacing the seat of Floreat which had existed since 1968.

It was held for most of its history by Liz Constable, the independent former member for Floreat who had won the predecessor seat in a 1991 by-election. However, the seat's demographics suggested it was a strongly Liberal seat on paper, as Floreat had been for most of its existence. It was taken for granted Constable would be succeeded by a Liberal once she retired. Constable retired at the 2013 election, and was succeeded as expected by Liberal Sean L'Estrange. L'Estrange held the seat until his unexpected defeat by Christine Tonkin in 2021, amid the Liberals losing all but one seat in Perth.

== Demographics ==
Churchlands and the neighbouring electorates of Nedlands to the southeast and Cottesloe to the southwest comprise the affluent western suburbs of Perth—the Australian Bureau of Statistics's SEIFA index (2001) ranked them as the highest three electorates by socio-economic status in Western Australia, with high scores on educational and employment opportunity. At the 2006 census, the median individual income in the Churchlands electorate, based on its 2005 boundaries, was $607 per week compared to $513 in the Perth metropolitan area, and the median weekly household income was $1,115 compared to $1,086 across Perth. 45.4% of the population were professionals or managers.

All three seats were considered comfortably safe Liberal seats, until the 2021 state election, and they are almost entirely within the federal seat of Curtin, which was safe Liberal as well until teal independent Kate Chaney won it in 2022.

== Members for Churchlands ==
Image	Member	Party	Term	Notes
	Liz Constable (1943–)	Independent	14 December 1996 – 9 March 2013	Transferred from the electoral district of Floreat. Retired
	Sean L'Estrange (1967–)	Liberal	9 March 2013 – 13 March 2021	Lost seat
	Christine Tonkin (1956–)	Labor	13 March 2021 – 8 March 2025	Lost seat
	Basil Zempilas (1971–)	Liberal	8 March 2025 – present	Incumbent

== Election results ==
2025 Western Australian state election: Churchlands
Party	Candidate	Votes	%	±%
Liberal	Basil Zempilas	12,199	43.7	+0.5
Labor	Christine Tonkin	8,049	28.8	−11.4
Independent	Lisa Thornton	3,912	14.0	+14.0
Greens	Caroline McLean	2,838	10.2	−0.2
Christians	James Rai	477	1.7	+0.2
Independent	Anthony Fels	268	1.0	+1.0
Fusion	Tian Carrie-Wilson	169	0.6	+0.6
Total formal votes		27,912	97.1	−0.3
Informal votes		823	2.9	+0.3
Turnout		28,735	90.2	+3.5
Two-party-preferred result
Liberal	Basil Zempilas	14,271	51.1	+2.7
Labor	Christine Tonkin	13,635	48.9	−2.7
Liberal gain from Labor		Swing	+2.7	
