= Peter Nattrass =

Australian mayor

Lord Mayor of Perth
- In office 1995–2007
- Deputy: Michael Sutherland; Bert Tudori; Janet Davidson
- Preceded by: Reg Withers
- Succeeded by: Lisa Scaffidi

Personal details
- Born: Peter Christopher Roland Nattrass; 15 October 1941 (age 84) Perth, Western Australia
- Spouse: Margot (former)
- Profession: Gynaecologist

Peter Christopher Roland Nattrass (born 15 October 1941) is an Australian gynaecologist, businessman, and politician. He was the lord mayor of the City of Perth from 1995 to 2007.

== Biography ==
Peter was born to Joyce Nattrass and Roland Nattrass, a consultant gynaecologist in Perth's public hospitals. He attended Hale School, the University of Western Australia (UWA) and the Royal College of Obstetricians and Gynaecologists (RCOG) in London. He began private practice in 1975.

== Public life ==
Nattrass was elected to the City of Perth council in 1977. His political career culminated in his election as Lord Mayor of Perth in 1995 succeeding Reg Withers. He was re-elected Lord Mayor in 1999 and again in 2003. His term in the office of Lord Mayor is the longest held for the City of Perth.

As lord mayor, Nattrass was opposed to Perth's Pride Parade, and attempted to ban it from the City of Perth multiple times. Nattrass was also opposed to the initial plans for the William Street tunnel, to be constructed as part of the Mandurah line, claiming it would be an eyesore. He said it "is one of the worst planning decisions this city has seen." He became supportive of it after it was changed from a cut-and-cover tunnel to a bored tunnel.

Nattrass was succeeded as Lord Mayor by Lisa Scaffidi on 21 October 2007.

Nattrass is a member of civic and planning commissions, Rotary, the Western Australian Trotting Association and the Royal King's Park Tennis Club and the Royal Perth Yacht Club. His family owns the Crawley Edge Boatshed.

Preceded by Reg Withers	Lord Mayor of Perth; 1995–2007	Succeeded by Lisa Scaffidi
