= 2023 Western Australian local elections =

- 21 October 2023

The 2023 Western Australian local elections were held on 21 October 2023 to elect the councils of 124 of the 137 local government areas (LGAs) in Western Australia. Many councils also held mayoral and deputy mayoral elections.

Electoral reform saw optional preferential voting introduced, and council representation changed to align with the population of the district.

Local elections in WA are held periodically, meaning around half of all councillors were not up for election until 2025.

== Electoral system ==
Significant electoral reform was introduced into the state parliament by the McGowan government in February 2023. It saw optional preferential voting (used for local and state elections in New South Wales) introduced, replacing first-past-the-post. Up until 2021 in multi-member wards, a voter would get to vote for as many candidates as there are vacancies (known as plurality voting).

Council representation was also changed to align with the population of the district, with council wards abolished for smaller councils. For all larger councils, the mayor or president will now be popularly elected, rather than appointed by councillors.

Almost all local elections were conducted via post. Eight councils held in-person elections:

- Broome
- Cambridge
- Cocos (Keeling) Islands
- Cranbrook
- Derby–West Kimberley
- East Pilbara
- Menzies
- Serpentine–Jarrahdale

== Political parties ==
Local elections in WA are officially non-partisan, and the vast majority of candidates and councillors are not members of any political party. The Labor Party confirmed at least 43 of its members were running for council, while the Greens endorsed two candidates.

Members of the Animal Justice Party, Australian Christians, Legalise Cannabis Party, No Mandatory Vaccination Party and Western Australia Party also all contested the elections. Liberal Party members ran without endorsement from their party.

== Campaign ==
The election campaigns in a number of LGAs saw controversies. In Busselton, candidate Stephen Wells was reported to have made racist and anti-semitic comments. In Swan, candidate Mani Singh had his election corflutes stolen and vandalised by a "rogue individual".

== Aftermath ==
The Australian Christians had their first ever electoral victory, with WA branch president Mike Crichton elected in Rockingham. The Animal Justice Party had their first electoral victory in WA, with state party committee member Amanda Dorn elected in Swan.

There were 47 instances of an uncontested race, while 17 vacancies were left unfilled.

== See also ==
- 2023 Perth City Council election
