= 1991 Floreat state by-election =

The 1991 Floreat state by-election was a by-election for the seat of Floreat in the Legislative Assembly of Western Australia held on 20 July 1991. It was triggered by the resignation of Andrew Mensaros (the sitting Liberal member) on 16 May 1991, due to ill health. He died before the by-election was held. The election was won by an independent candidate, Liz Constable, who finished with 58.94 percent of the two-candidate-preferred vote. Constable became the first woman to win election to the Parliament of Western Australia as an independent (although not the first to sit as an independent – Pam Buchanan had resigned from the Labor Party earlier in the year), and only the third woman overall to win a by-election (after May Holman in 1925 and Judy Edwards in 1990).

== Background ==
Andrew Mensaros, a Hungarian immigrant, had held Floreat for the Liberal Party since the seat's creation at the 1968 state election. He served as a minister in the governments of Sir Charles Court and Ray O'Connor. Mensaros resigned from parliament on 16 May 1991, due to ill health, and died of cancer thirteen days later. The writ for the by-election was issued on 14 June, with the close of nominations on 27 June. Polling day was on 20 July, with the writ returned on 31 July.

The Labor Party chose not to contest the by-election, as Floreat was regarded as a Liberal safe seat. Michael Huston won preselection for the Liberal Party, with the endorsement of Senator Noel Crichton-Browne (a powerbroker). Liz Constable had initially contested Liberal preselection, but withdrew from the process amid claims of branch stacking. She subsequently resigned from the party and chose to contest the election as an independent. She was supported by a former Liberal MP, Dick Old, who also resigned from the party in solidarity.

== Results ==
Floreat state by-election, 1991
Party	Candidate	Votes	%	±%
Independent	Liz Constable	8,358	49.0	+49.0
Liberal	Michael Huston	6,302	37.0	–26.3
Greens	John White	932	5.5	+5.5
Independent	Barbara Churchward	663	3.9	+3.9
Independent	Geoffrey McPhee	323	1.9	+1.9
Independent	Paul Cribbon	292	1.7	+1.7
Independent	Alfred Bussell	95	0.6	+0.6
Grey Power	Jane King	86	0.5	–7.6
Total formal votes		17,050	97.5	+1.5
Informal votes		436	2.5	–1.5
Turnout		17,486	82.9	–8.7
Two-candidate-preferred result
Independent	Liz Constable	10,049	58.9	+58.9
Liberal	Michael Huston	7,001	41.1	–29.2
Independent gain from Liberal		Swing	N/A	

== Aftermath ==
Constable retained Floreat with an increased majority at the 1993 state election. The seat was abolished at the 1996 election, but she transferred to the new seat of Churchlands, which she held until her retirement at the 2013 election. Her chief opponent at the by-election, Michael Huston, contested the Senate at the 1996 federal election, but was placed in the unwinnable fourth position on the Liberal ticket.

== See also ==
- 1991 Geraldton state by-election, held on the same day
- List of Western Australian state by-elections
- Women in the Western Australian Legislative Assembly
