= 2023 Perth City Council election =

Local election in Western Australia

- 21 October 2023
- Turnout: 34.51%
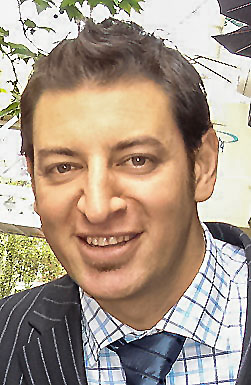
	First party	Second party	Third party
		IND	IND
Candidate	Basil Zempilas	Sandy Anghie	Will Leyland
Party	Independent	Independent	Independent
Popular vote	3,264	2,108	405
Percentage	56.50%	36.49%	7.01%
Swing	▲27.06	▲26.92	▲7.01
Lord Mayor before election
Basil Zempilas
Independent
Subsequent Lord Mayor
Basil Zempilas
Independent

The 2023 Perth City Council election was held on was held on 21 October 2023 to elect a lord mayor and 4 councillors to the City of Perth. The election was held as part of the statewide local elections in Western Australia.

== Background ==
The previous mayoral election was held in October 2020, following the council's suspension by the Western Australian state government in 2018. Four of the eight councillors elected in 2020 faced another election in 2021, while the remaining four had their terms expire in 2023.

Three candidates contended the position of Lord Mayor − incumbent Basil Zempilas, councillor Sandy Anghie (who also contested the 2020 election) and Will Leyland.

The campaign was surrounded by claims that Zempilas would join the Western Australian Liberal Party and contest the 2025 state election. On 6 September 2023, Zempilas confirmed he would seek re-election. Anghie campaigned on "serving full time for a full term," and said she did not have ambitions for state or federal politics.

The Greens endorsed one candidate − Isabella Tripp − who also ran in Cowan at the 2022 federal election.

Electoral reform introduced into the state parliament by the McGowan government in February 2023 saw optional preferential voting (used for state and some local elections in New South Wales) introduced, replacing first-past-the-post.

== Results ==
2023 Western Australian local elections: Perth
Party	Candidate	Votes	%	±%
Independent	Catherine Lezer (elected)	911	16.57	
Independent Liberal	Bruce Reynolds (elected)	827	15.04	
Independent Labor	David Goncalves (elected)	547	9.95	
Independent	Crawford Yorke	519	9.44	
Independent	Raj Doshi (elected)	442	8.04	
Independent	Glennys Marsdon	420	7.64	
Independent	Bronte Macmillan	365	6.64	
Independent	Will Leyland	361	6.57	
Independent	Naijiao (Jason) Bo	330	6.00	
Green	Isabella Tripp	304	5.53	
Independent	Dave Lee	244	4.44	
Independent	Shirley Vine	227	4.13	
Total formal votes		5,497	98.76	
Informal votes		69	1.24	
Turnout		5,566	33.00	

=== Mayoral election ===
2023 Western Australian mayoral elections: Perth
Party	Candidate	Votes	%	±%
Independent	Basil Zempilas	3,264	56.50	+27.06
Independent	Sandy Anghie	2,108	36.49	+26.92
Independent	Will Leyland	405	7.01	+7.01
Total formal votes		5,777	99.26	
Informal votes		43	0.74	
Turnout		5,820	34.51	−6.78
Independent hold		Swing	+27.06	
