= Liz Constable =

Australian politician

Elizabeth Constable AM

Member of the Western Australian Legislative Assembly for Churchlands
- In office 14 December 1996 – 9 March 2013
- Preceded by: Division created
- Succeeded by: Sean L'Estrange

Member of the Western Australian Legislative Assembly for Floreat
- In office 20 July 1991 – 14 December 1996
- Preceded by: Andrew Mensaros
- Succeeded by: Division abolished

Personal details
- Born: 2 December 1943 (age 82) Sydney, New South Wales
- Party: Independent
- Education: PhD
- Profession: Lecturer

Elizabeth Constable (born 2 December 1943) is an Australian former politician who was an independent member of the Western Australian Legislative Assembly, first representing the electorate Floreat after winning it at a 1991 by-election following the resignation of Andrew Mensaros. After the abolition of Floreat in a redistribution in 1994, Constable was elected to the electorate of Churchlands in 1996 then re-elected in 2001 and 2005. In September 2011 she became the longest-serving female State Parliamentarian in WA, breaking the record set by Florence Cardell-Oliver who served from February 1936 to April 1956. Constable retired at the 2013 state election and was appointed a Member of the Order of Australia in 2019.

== Background ==
Constable was once a member of the Liberal Party before becoming an independent. She left the Liberal Party when it became clear that the favoured candidate of power-broker Noel Crichton-Browne would be given preselection for the safe seat of Floreat at a 1991 by-election at her expense. Constable contested the seat as a conservative independent and won easily with 49% of the primary vote.

Constable followed most of her constituents into Churchlands in 1996, and was comfortably reelected at every election since then. She held the seat with a majority of 23 percent, making it the safest seat in the state.

== Minister in the Barnett Government ==
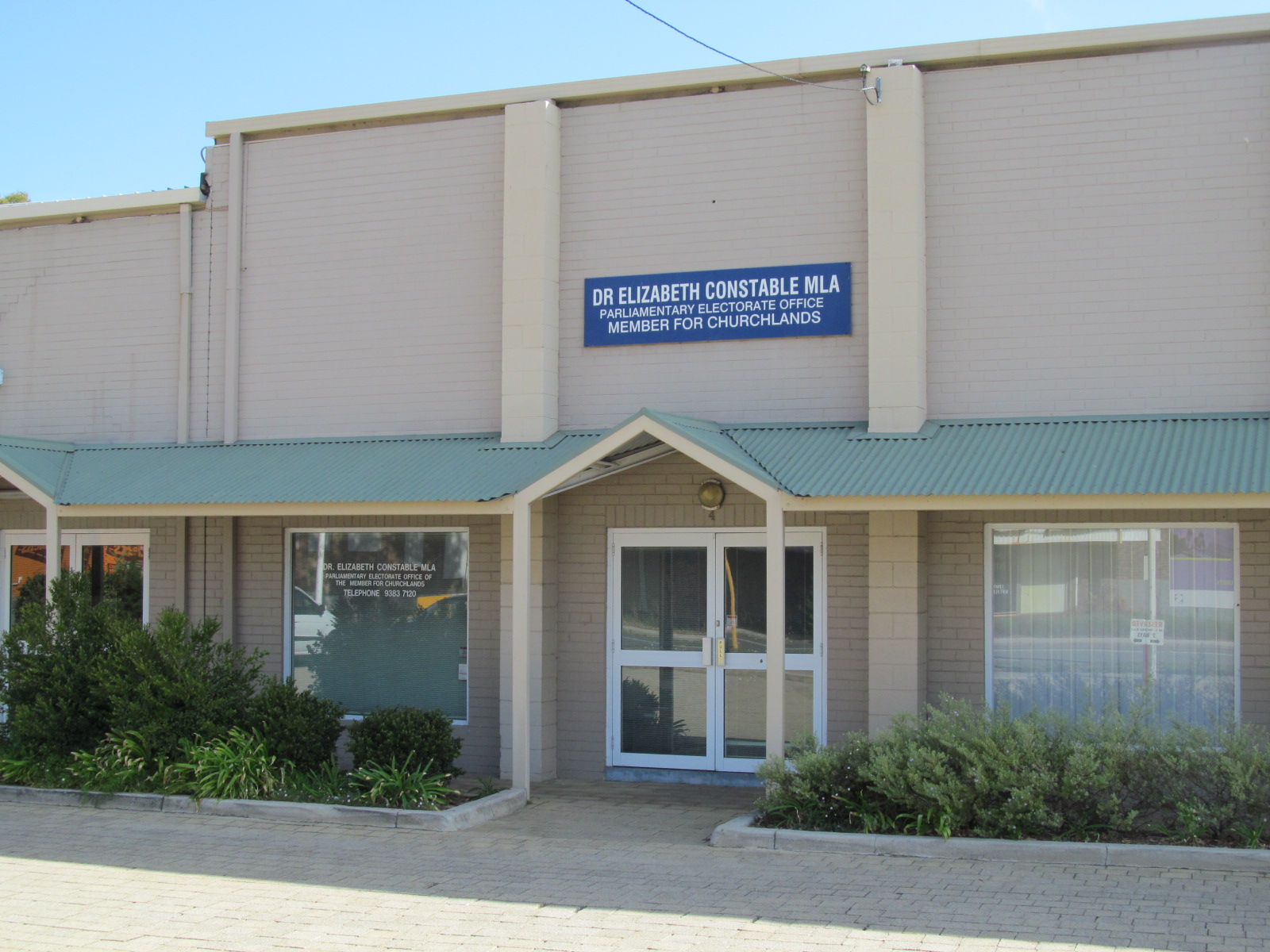
Constable's electorate office

In November 2008, Constable was appointed Minister for Education, Tourism and Women's Interests in the Barnett Ministry, thereby becoming the first Independent to be appointed as a Minister of the Crown in Western Australia. She was removed from the tourism portfolio in December 2010, three months after she was the subject of a critical motion.

In early 2011, Constable was criticised in regard to a Government policy which left children with no air-conditioning for new buildings outside the "air cooling zone" established by the state Government and so regularly subject to internal temperatures of heat above 35 degrees in more than 300 schools. Despite the Commonwealth providing the funding for the air-conditioning, the WA State Government, and Constable's department, did not allow schools to install the funded air conditioning in new building. Constable had said if schools arranged for independent contractors to install air-conditioning within 12 months of construction, it would void the building warranty.

On 1 March 2011 when the problem became public, Constable said she would wait until a policy review was completed mid-year before deciding her position. However, on 2 March 2011, when it became known that Constable had been aware of the problem for over one year, she decided that Parents and Citizens' Association committees could install air-conditioners should they wish to purchase them themselves.

== Government accountability and ministerial conduct ==
Constable has long been a vocal public proponent of open, accountable government and ministerial accountability, believing they are fundamental to good government. Prior to the 2008 Western Australian state election, Constable said that "open and accountable government is fundamental to good government. In recent times the signs have not always been good." Constable has also highlighted a reluctance of government ministers to respect the spirit of Freedom of Information Legislation. In particular Constable has discussed in the WA Parliament the failings of ministers to abide by high standards of conduct.

In both 2003 and 2007 Constable introduced to the Western Australian Parliament the Lobbying Disclosure and Accountability Bill. The Bill had the intent of introducing measures to "ensure openness and accountability of professional lobbying activities directed at Members of Parliament, ministerial staff and other public officials in Western Australia."

Western Australian Legislative Assembly
| Preceded by Andrew Mensaros | Member for Floreat; 1991–1996 | Succeeded by Seat abolished |
| Preceded by New seat | Member for Churchlands; 1996–2013 | Succeeded by Sean L'Estrange |
