= Charles Veryard =

Australian politician

How to Vote card for 1964 Lord mayoral election

Charles John Besley Veryard (1900–7 September 1967) was a City of Perth Councillor from 1927 until 1964 and Lord Mayor of Perth from 1964 to his death in 1967.

Veryard was also a manager and director of West Cycles. He attended Hale School and played three seasons of football with West Perth Football Club between 1917 and 1920.

The Charles Veryard Reserve in Bourke Street, North Perth is named in his honour.

In August 1951, Veryard was convicted and fined for tax fraud after understating his income.

His grandfather, John Veryard, was a member of state parliament in Western Australia and a mayor of the Municipality of Leederville.
