= Basil Zempilas =

Australian politician and media personality

Basil Zempilas MLA
- Zempilas in 2025

38th Leader of the Opposition in Western Australia
- Incumbent
- Assumed office 25 March 2025
- Premier: Roger Cook
- Deputy: Libby Mettam
- Preceded by: Shane Love

Leader of the Western Australian Liberal Party
- Incumbent
- Assumed office 25 March 2025
- Deputy: Libby Mettam
- Preceded by: Libby Mettam

Member of the Western Australian Legislative Assembly for Churchlands
- Incumbent
- Assumed office 8 March 2025
- Preceded by: Christine Tonkin

56th Lord Mayor of Perth
- In office 19 October 2020 – 7 March 2025
- Deputy: Bruce Reynolds (2024–25); Clyde Bevan (2023–24); Liam Gobbert (2022–23); Di Bain (2021–22); Sandy Anghie (2020–21)
- Preceded by: Lisa Scaffidi
- Succeeded by: Bruce Reynolds

Personal details
- Born: Basil Anthony Zempilas; 30 July 1971 (age 55) Perth, Western Australia, Australia
- Party: Liberal (2024−present)
- Other political affiliations: Independent (until 2024)
- Spouse: Amy Zempilas (m. 2009)
- Children: 3
- Education: Hale School
- Alma mater: Murdoch University (BA)
- Occupation: Sports commentator; Radio personality; News presenter; Politician
Australian rules football career
Personal information
- Original team: West Perth Football Club (WAFL)
- Positions: Ruck, forward
Playing career
Years	Club	Games (Goals)
1990–1994	West Perth (WAFL); Perth Football League	24 (25)
Total		9-15-0

Basil Anthony Zempilas (Greek: Βασίλειος Αντώνης Ζεμπίλας, romanized: Vasílios Antónis Zempílas; born 30 July 1971) is an Australian politician who is the leader of the Western Australian Liberal Party and the member for Churchlands in the Western Australian Legislative Assembly, serving in both roles since March 2025. He previously served as the Lord Mayor of Perth from 2020 until 2025.

Zempilas is a former footballer, television and radio presenter, sports commentator and columnist. He presented sport on Seven News Perth Monday to Thursday until 2022. In 2018 he became a co-host of Weekend Sunrise. He was also a member of the Seven Network's AFL commentary team. He has co-hosted Perth radio station breakfast programs on 92.9, 6PR and Triple M Perth.

== Early life ==
Zempilas is of Greek descent – his mother Jessie was born on the island of Kastellorizo and his father Anthony's family also originates from the island. He attended Floreat Park Primary School and Hale School in Perth; he attended Hale along with Liberal Party politician and lawyer Christian Porter. Zempilas graduated from Perth's Murdoch University in 1992 with a degree in Media Studies and Mass Communications.

Zempilas played for the West Perth Football Club playing as a ruckman and forward, but retired due to injury. Zempilas played 24 games in the West Australian Football League between 1990 and 1994, kicking 25 goals including kicking 5 in a semi final in 1993.

== Media career ==
Zempilas began his career at the Seven Network in February 1994 as a cadet sports reporter. He was awarded "Best News Story" at the annual Western Australia Football Commission media awards for his coverage of the Melbourne Football Club being thrown out of a West Coast Eagles closed training session. In 1996, he was named the "Best Television Personality" at the same awards.

In 1996 Zempilas was promoted to weekend sports anchor on Seven News, a position he held until the end of 2001, when Seven lost the rights to broadcast AFL. In 1997 he commenced hosting a locally produced football show, Basil's Footy Show. He hosted the 1998 World Aquatics Championships in Perth and co-hosted the local television program Perth at Five with Yvette Mooney.

Zempilas has been involved with the Seven Network's coverage of the Olympic Games since the 2000 Sydney Olympics, where he co-hosted Tonight at the Games with Bruce Abernethy for the Western Australia and South Australia markets. At the 2002 Winter Olympics, Zempilas called Steven Bradbury's win in the 1000 m speed skating; Australia's first Winter Olympic Gold medal. Zempilas provided rowing and basketball commentary at the 2004 Athens Olympic Games and represented Seven News at the 2005 World Aquatics Championships. In 2006 he began presenting the AFL segment on the Seven Network program Sportsworld with David Schwarz. He called the speed skating event at the 2006 Winter Olympics with Bradbury and also commentated on Rowing, Canoe/Kayak and Basketball at the 2008 Summer Olympics.

Zempilas is the senior sports presenter on Seven News Perth, and in the past has provided AFL commentary on radio station 1116 SEN in Melbourne. He was a co-host of the Lisa, Paul & Baz show on Perth's 92.9 but left in November 2013. He joined Steve Mills to host the 6PR breakfast radio show in January 2014.

Since 2012, Zempilas has been part of the Seven Network's expanded AFL broadcast team. Between 2012 and 2016, he mainly called Saturday afternoon matches and occasionally some Friday night (if the match in this timeslot is played in Perth) and Sunday afternoon matches; in 2017, he called Saturday night matches and continued to call Thursday and Friday night matches played in Perth. In 2018, due to his Weekend Sunrise commitments, his football duties were reduced to calling only Friday and Saturday night matches played in Sydney, and some matches in Perth.

He was also a commentator for Seven's Australian Open tennis coverage and is the host of the annual Channel Seven Perth Telethon.

In March 2018, Zempilas was appointed co-host of Weekend Sunrise replacing Andrew O'Keefe after previously filling in as host of the show. In September 2019, Zempilas stepped down as regular host of Weekend Sunrise, citing a desire to spend more time with his family, however he still appears on the show intermittently as a summer and fill-in presenter whenever required. In October 2019, it was announced that Matt Doran would replace Zempilas on the show from October 12.

In October 2020, it was announced Zempilas and 6PR would part ways at the end of his contract in November, due to 6PR being owned by Nine Entertainment Co.

In December 2020, Zempilas finished up at 6PR, but the following week he was announced as host of Triple M Perth's breakfast program with Jenna Clarke and Xavier Ellis.

In February 2022, it was announced that Zempilas would scale back his duties with the Seven Network, stepping down from his role as sports presenter on Seven News Perth.

== Political career ==
In January 2020, Zempilas announced that he was running to be the Lord Mayor of the City of Perth. Zempilas said if successful in the election, he would step down from his role on 6PR, but continue working with Seven News. He has been criticised for using his media presence to promote himself as a candidate, and for his support by The West Australian, who is his employer. The Western Australian Electoral Commission warned Zempilas that his columns in The West Australian which he uses to promote himself for lord mayor must be authorised.

=== Lord Mayor of Perth (2020–2025) ===
On 17 October 2020, Zempilas won the election, defeating six other candidates. Zempilas received 1,855 votes, or 29.44% of the vote with 41% turnout (thus polling 12.07% of eligible voters). Zempilas defeated his nearest rival, former ABC journalist Di Bain, by 284 votes.

On 19 October 2020, Zempilas was sworn in as Lord Mayor of Perth, stating, "It is a significant honour to be sworn-in as the 18th Lord Mayor of this great city. It is also a great responsibility and immensely humbling. It is with genuine anticipation I pledge to lead a collaborative, consultative approach to high quality government."

In December 2021, Zempilas indicated he will run for Perth mayor again in the next election, stating, "My intention right now is to run again in 2023... So three years – I feel a little short-changed, having won an election, typically that means four years... My intention is absolutely to run again. I love the role and I'd like to see a lot of the things that we've got started, I'd like to see them finished off."

In 2021, Zempilas was "mentioned as a potential Liberal party option for a Campbell Newman-like tilt at the next [Western Australia] state election in four years."

In 2023, Zempilas was re-elected as Lord Mayor. Zempilas received 3,264 votes, or 56.50% of the vote.

The West Australian announced Zempilas' intention to join the Liberal Party and seek preselection for the electoral district of Churchlands on its front page on 27 January 2024. He said he intends to remain as lord mayor unless he is elected to parliament, only taking a leave of absence during the election campaign in 2025, citing the precedent set by former Wanneroo mayor Tracey Roberts, who was elected to the federal parliament in 2022.

=== Liberal leader ===
In the 2025 Western Australian state election campaign, Zempilas was announced as the Liberal candidate for the electorate of Churchlands which he won from sitting Labor MP Christine Tonkin. Two weeks after his electoral victory he was elected unopposed as the new Leader of the WA Liberal Party and hence, the state's Opposition Leader.

== Controversies ==
In January 2007, Zempilas received a fine and a three-month suspension of his driver's licence after pleading guilty to drink driving.

In November 2019, Zempilas used his column in The West Australian to make comments about the homeless situation in Perth, vowing that if elected Lord Mayor of Perth, he would "clean up" the city from rough sleepers, stating, "I make no apologies for this, the homeless need to be moved out of the Hay and Murray street malls and the surrounding areas... Forcibly, if that's what it takes. I'm sick of being told by people who don't live and work in the city like I do that it's not that bad — actually, it's worse... The look, the smell, the language, the fights — it's disgusting. A blight on our city." These comments were considered to have displayed a lack of empathy and later became the subject of a guerilla artist installation in the city.

In March 2020, Zempilas conducted a television interview with former West Coast Eagles captain Ben Cousins, whose highly publicised post-football life was characterised by struggles with drug addiction and various run-ins with the law. The interview, which was broadcast by Channel 7 amid much publicity, was widely condemned. Veteran journalist Caroline Wilson described Zempilas as "beyond grubby" and "beyond demeaning" for his line of questioning of Cousins. Zempilas and Channel 7 defended the broadcast against accusations that it was exploitative of Cousins and the revelation that Cousins was paid for the interview.

Zempilas was criticised in 2020 for using his media presence to promote himself as a candidate during the Perth mayoral election campaign. After Zempilas revealed plans to rally a team of like-minded council hopefuls, including his cousin Gary Mitchell, for the City of Perth, he was accused by rival candidate Mark Gibson of "stacking" the council with friends and family to snatch a voting majority. Zempilas was also criticised for announcing a plan to raise council rates for landlords with vacant retail space; the Property Council of Perth responded by saying rent increases for struggling owners were "poor policy" and "hardly an incentive."

Following his appointment as Lord Mayor of Perth, Zempilas has been criticised for having a "very strong conflict of interest" with his ongoing media commitments.

In October 2020, less than two weeks after being sworn in as Lord Mayor of Perth, Zempilas made comments on his radio show that some considered transphobic. He said "If you've got a penis mate, you're a bloke. If you've got a vagina, you're a woman. Game over." The comments were widely denounced, and Zempilas apologised the next day. A subsequent online petition called upon West Australian Premier Mark McGowan to sack Zempilas; the petition received 11,500 signatures. In the wake of Zempilas' controversial comments, the electronics retailer Retravision withdrew its advertising from 6PR, the radio station Zempilas was affiliated with at the time, and a public protest against Zempilas was held in Perth. Zempilas was also confronted by Perth LGBTQ groups during his first council meeting as Lord Mayor. A joint open letter from TransFolk of WA and Pride WA stated,

The Trans community and greater LGBTQI+ community in WA has weathered a cruel storm in the past week. It has been painful not only to hear the comments made by Mr Zempilas during his radio broadcast, but to hear them repeated endlessly in the media and the wider community, compounds the harm being done. We understand many within the community are angry, hurt, disappointed and feel betrayed. We know first-hand how such comments can be dangerous not only to individuals, but also to the health of our society, and therefore have no place in it."

Zempilas' comments also caused a push to move Western Australia's annual Pride parade, PrideFest, from Perth to the nearby City of Vincent.

In March 2021, Zempilas was publicly criticised on Twitter by ABC journalist Emma Wynne for comments he made towards Triple M co-host Jenna Clarke during their breakfast radio show. Zempilas defended his comments, which he said were taken out of context.

In September 2021, Zempilas was the master of ceremonies of the 2021 AFL Grand Final at Perth's Optus Stadium, the first AFL grand final played in Perth and the second consecutive grand final to be played outside Victoria. In the days leading up to the grand final, Zempilas suggested via Twitter that the crowd at the game should stand and applaud for one minute in recognition of the rest of the country's ongoing struggle against the COVID-19 pandemic. This suggestion drew widespread criticism online, with accusations of it being "tone deaf," "cringeworthy," and "patronising." In response to the backlash against his suggestion, Zempilas stated, "I realise it's been received in a mixed way, but let me tell you the intention is pure."

Zempilas drew public criticism for the manner in which he conducted the post-game ceremony. Zempilas did not allow Simon Goodwin, the coach of the Melbourne Demons, to make a customary victory speech during the post-game ceremony. Goodwin walked onto the stage to receive his Jock McHale Medal from John Worsfold, embraced Demons captain Max Gawn, and looked to make his way to the microphone, but before he could speak, Zempilas invited Garry Lyon to the stage to present the premiership cup to Goodwin and Gawn. The other Melbourne Demons swarmed the stage after Goodwin and Gawn held the cup aloft. The following day, Goodwin admitted he had a speech prepared. Zempilas later apologised for denying Goodwin the chance to make his speech, describing the situation as "regrettable" and "disappointing." The CEO of the AFL, Gillon McLachlan, said, "It was a mistake. Mistakes happen; it was disappointing for Simon, but it was a mistake."

In January 2024, Zempilas was captured on a hot mic apparently referring to the Australian Open women's final as a "reserve game", prior to a press conference announcing he was joining the Liberal Party. Zempilas later said that he was taken out of context, and that he was referring to a "derby" between the reporter Michael Genovese and his partner hosting the news on different channels, which Genovese later confirmed.

On 8 June 2026, Zempilas said the One Nation party deserved "respect" and said he had an "open mind about" working with the party in the next state election.

== Personal life ==
In March 2004, a portrait of Zempilas by Perth artist Melinda Mackay was entered in the Archibald Prize, and in the same year he featured in Cleo's 50 Most Eligible Bachelors.

On 6 September 2009, Zempilas married his longtime girlfriend Amy Graham on the island of Kastellorizo, Greece. They have two daughters Chloe and Ava and a son.

Zempilas owns three properties. His primary residence is a house in Floreat he bought in 2019 for nearly $2 million. He also owns a mansion in North Coogee which he bought in 2007 for $1.6 million and an apartment in Northbridge which he bought in the mid-1990s, his only property within the City of Perth. In 2023, he sold an apartment on Mount Street in West Perth for $1.9 million.

Civic offices
Preceded by Lisa Scaffidi	Lord Mayor of Perth; 2020–2025	Succeeded by Bruce Reynolds
Western Australian Legislative Assembly
Preceded by Christine Tonkin	Member for Churchlands; 2025–present	Incumbent
Party political offices
Preceded by Libby Mettam	Leader of the Western Australian Liberal Party; 2025–present	Incumbent
Political offices
Preceded by Shane Love	Leader of the Opposition in Western Australia; 2025–present	Incumbent
