= Electoral district of Floreat =

Former electoral district in Western Australia

Floreat Western Australia—Legislative Assembly
- State: Western Australia
- Dates current: 1968–1996
- Namesake: Floreat

Floreat was an electoral district of the Legislative Assembly in the Australian state of Western Australia from 1968 to 1996.

The district was based in the inner northwestern suburbs of Perth and was created in the 1966 redistribution. First contested at the 1968 state election, it was won by Liberal candidate Andrew Mensaros, who served as a minister in a number of portfolios under Sir Charles Court and Ray O'Connor from 1974 to 1983, and as shadow attorney-general amongst other responsibilities thereafter.

Mensaros resigned the seat on 16 May 1991 due to ill health, triggering a by-election won by independent candidate Liz Constable. Constable had originally intended to seek Liberal endorsement, but ran as an independent once it became clear that she would not win party preselection. Constable remained the member for Floreat until the seat's abolition ahead of the 1996 state election. She then successfully contested the new seat of Churchlands, which largely replaced Floreat.

== Members for Floreat ==
Member	Party	Term
Andrew Mensaros	Liberal	1968–1991
Liz Constable	Independent	1991–1996
