= List of mayors and lord mayors of Perth =

Lord Mayor of Perth
- Incumbent; Bruce Reynolds since October 2025
- Style: The Right Honourable Lord Mayor
- Inaugural holder: James T. Franklin (Note: James T. Franklin was the first to serve as Lord Mayor. The first Chairman was George Leake and the first Mayor was George Shenton.)
- Formation: 1929 (Note: The position was titled "Chairman" from 1838 to 1879, "Mayor" from 1879 to 1929 and "Lord Mayor" since 1929.)

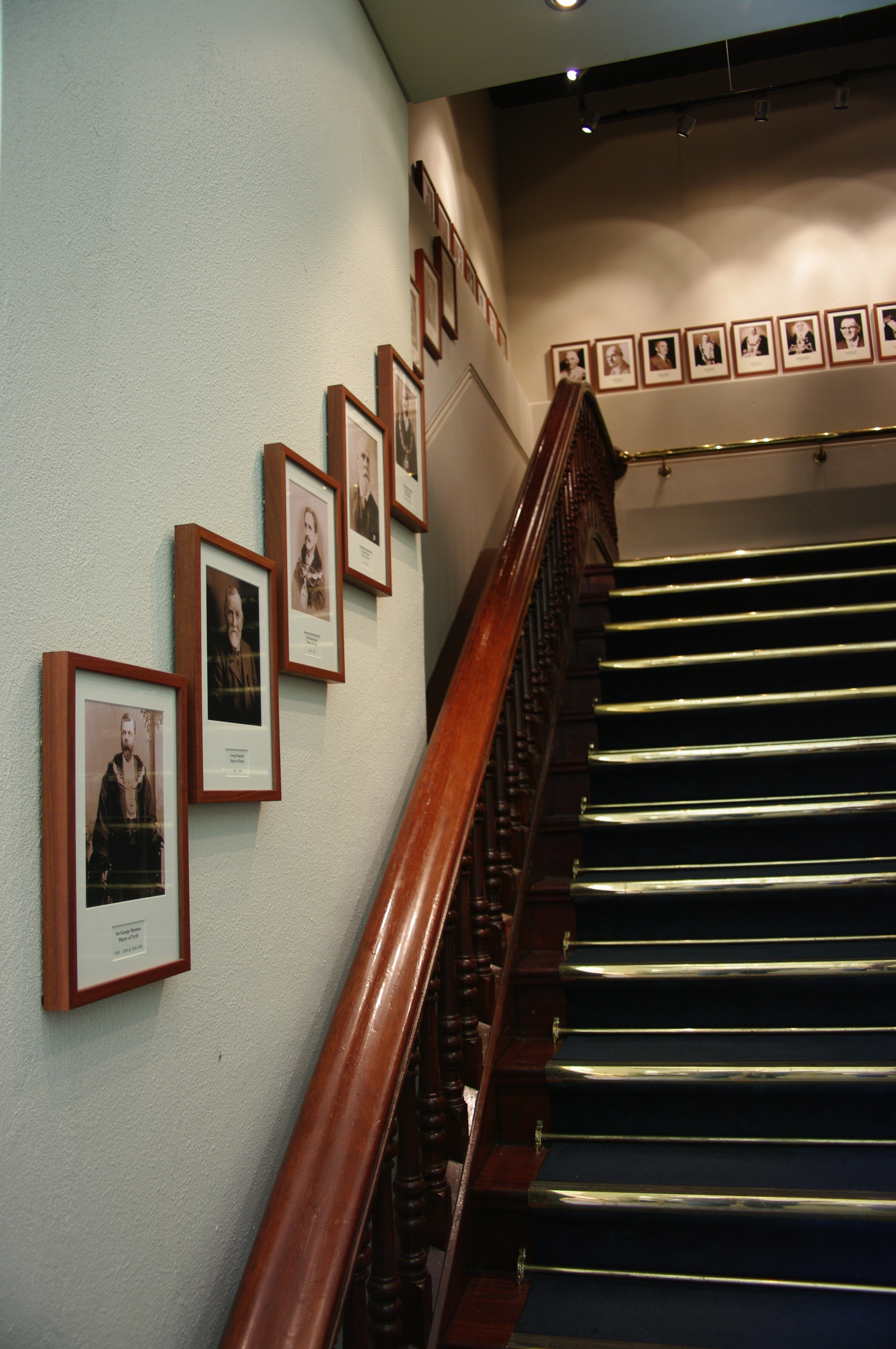
Photographs of all mayors and lord mayors start from George Shenton on the staircase of the Perth Town Hall

The lord mayor of Perth is the head of the City of Perth, the capital city of Western Australia. The position originated as chairman of the Perth Town Trust, which governed the settlement from 1838 to 1858. With the establishment of the Perth City Council in 1858, the leadership title continued to be chairman, becoming mayor in 1880. In 1929, the title was elevated to lord mayor to mark the centenary of the city's founding. This article lists all individuals who have served as chairman, mayor, and lord mayor of Perth.

The history of the City of Perth, a local government area of Western Australia is defined over three distinct periods:

- From 1829 to 1838 — controlled by the Governor of Western Australia
- From 1838 to 1858 — controlled by the Perth Town Trust
- From 1858 to present — controlled by the Perth City Council, later renamed City of Perth

== Origins ==
On 15 June 1837, an Act was proclaimed to ..provide for the management of roads, streets and other internal communications within the settlement of Western Australia. The management and control was vested in a body of trustees consisting of the Justices of the Peace resident in the town; and the proprietors of allotments held in fee simple. The act was repealed in September 1842 and authority was conferred on elected representatives. The first elected Chairman and committee took office on 8 February 1842 and comprised:

- Walter Boyd Andrews (Chairman)
- George Leake, James Purkis, Peter Broun, W. H. Drake, Richard Jones (committee members)
- James Purkis was appointed treasurer

On 23 February 1856 (two years before the dissolution of the Trust), Perth was constituted a city upon the foundation of the Bishopric of Perth through the consecration of the first Anglican Bishop of Perth, Matthew Blagden Hale.

From 1858 to 1880, the President of the Council was styled "Chairman", from 1880 until 1929, the Chairman was termed the "Mayor" and from 1929 the mayor was elevated to the title of "Lord Mayor".

== Chairman, Perth Town Trust (1838–1858) ==
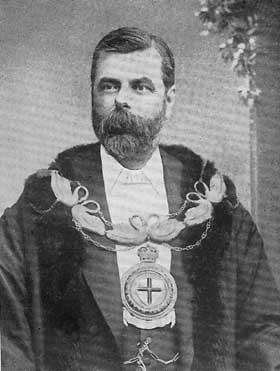
George Shenton (Jr.) in his mayoral robes. Chairman of Perth City Council from 1876–77; and mayor in 1880–84 and 1886–88. He became Sir George Shenton in 1893.

Officeholder	Term
George Leake	1838–1840
Richard Hinds	1841
Walter Boyd Andrews	1842
Thomas Helms	1843–1845
James Purkis	1846–1848
Thomas Helms	1849
Henry Laroche Cole	1853
George Shenton Sr	1854–1855
George Shenton Sr; Sir Luke Leake	1856
George Shenton Sr	1857–1858

== Chairman, Perth City Council (1858–1879) ==
Officeholder	Term
Henry Laroche Cole	1858–1860
Julian Carr	1861–1863
Julian Carr; Alfred Hillman; George Haysom	1864
Julian Carr	1865–1868
Julian Carr; George Glyde	1869
George Glyde	1870–1873
George Randell	1874–1875
George Shenton	1876–1877
Sir Stephen Henry Parker	1877–1879

== Mayor, Perth City Council (1880–1929) ==
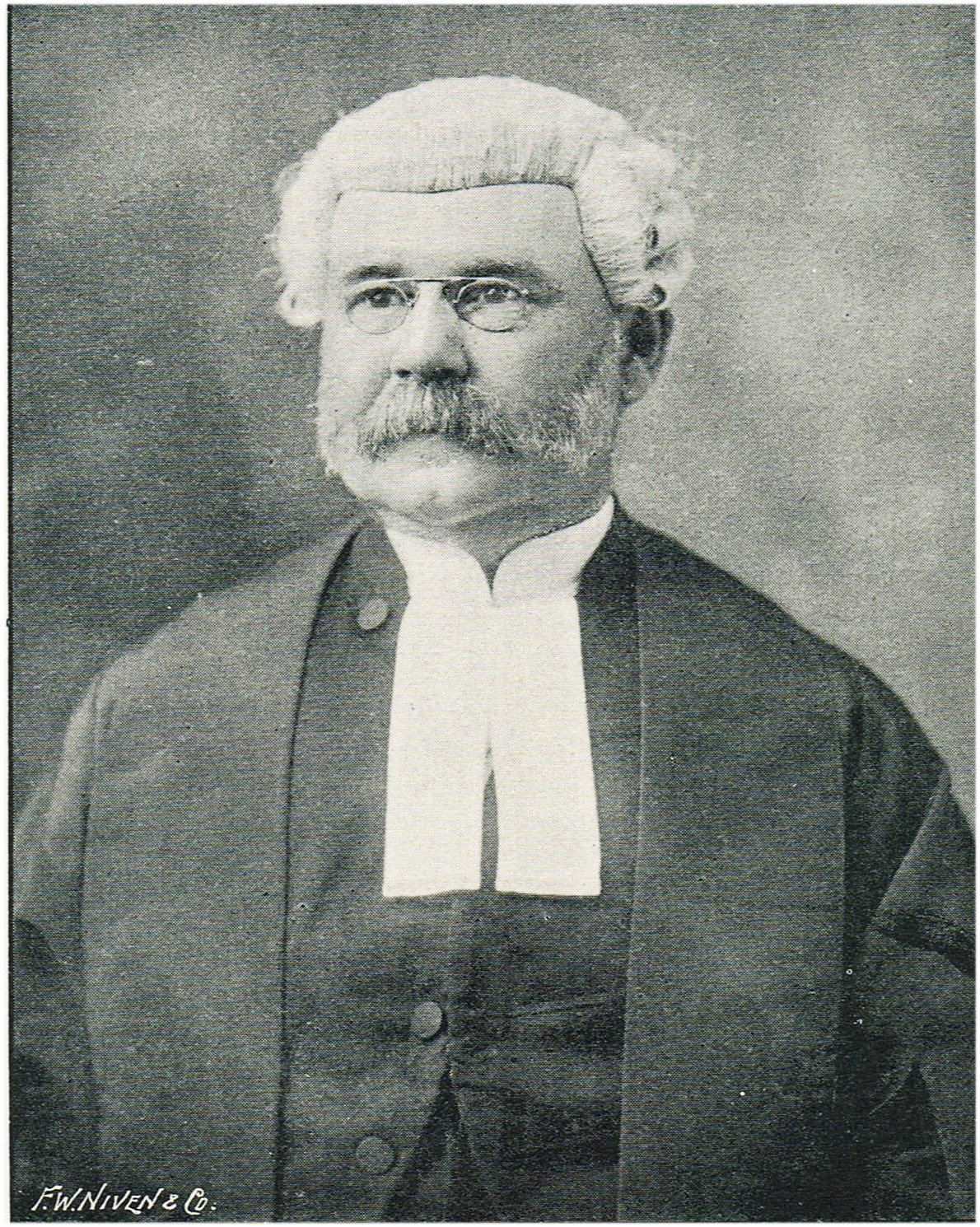
Stephen Henry Parker who had four separate terms of office

Officeholder	Term
George Shenton	1880
Stephen Henry Parker; George Shenton	1881
George Shenton	1882–1884
George Randell	1885
George Shenton	1886–1888
Dr Edward Scott	1889–1891
Edward Keane	1891–1892
Sir Stephen Henry Parker	1892
Alexander Forrest	1893–1895
Henry Saunders	1895–1898
Alexander Forrest	1898–1900
William Brookman	1900–1901
Sir Stephen Henry Parker	1901
William Loton	1901–1902
Harry Brown	1902–1905
Sydney Stubbs	1905–1907
Thomas Molloy	1908–1909
Richard Paul Vincent	1909–1911
Thomas Molloy	1911–1912
John Prowse (Note: The Australian Dictionary of Biography states Charles Nathan served as mayor in 1914, but contemporary sources state that Prowse was succeeded directly by Nicholson.)	1913–1914
John Nicholson	1914–1915
Frank Rea	1916–1917
Sir William Lathlain	1918–1923
James Franklin	1923–1929

== Lord Mayor, Perth City Council (since 1929) ==
Officeholder	Term
Hon James T Franklin	1929–1930
Hon Sir William Lathlain	1930–1932
Hon James T Franklin	1932–1934
Joseph J. Poynton	1934–1937
Charles Harper	1937–1939
Sir Thomas William Meagher	1940–1945
Sir Joseph Totterdell	1946–1953
James Murray	1953–1955
Sir Harry Howard	1955–1964
Charles J. B. Veryard	1964–1967
Sir Thomas Wardle	1967–1972
Ernest Henry Lee-Steere	1972–1978
Sir Fred Chaney	1978–1982
Mick Michael	1982–1988
Chas Hopkins	1988–1991
Rt Hon Reg Withers	1991–1994
Dr Peter Nattrass	1995–2007
Lisa Scaffidi	20 October 2007 – 2 March 2018
None (Note: The City of Perth was run by appointed commissioners from 2 March 2018 to 18 October 2020.)	2 March 2018 – 18 October 2020
Basil Zempilas	19 October 2020 – March 2025
None	March 2025 – October 2025
Bruce Reynolds	October 2025 – present

== Electoral results ==
=== 2023 ===
2023 Western Australian mayoral elections: Perth
Party	Candidate	Votes	%	±%
Independent	Basil Zempilas	3,264	56.50	+27.06
Independent	Sandy Anghie	2,108	36.49	+26.92
Independent	Will Leyland	405	7.01	+7.01
Total formal votes		5,777	99.26	
Informal votes		43	0.74	
Turnout		5,820	34.51	−6.78
Independent hold		Swing	+27.06	

== Sources ==
- W.E. Bold, (Town Clerk) (October 1939). "The Story of the Municipal Development Of Our City". Early Days. II: 29–41.
- Perry, Philippa (25 June 2007). "Perth "lost" history found in old safe". The West Australian. p. 11.
