= Electoral results for the district of Warren-Blackwood =

Western Australian district election results

This is a list of electoral results for the electoral district of Warren-Blackwood in Western Australian state elections.

== Members for Warren-Blackwood ==
Warren (1950–1996)
Member	Party	Term
Ernest Hoar	Labor	1950–1957
Joseph Rowberry	Labor	1958–1968
David Evans	Labor	1968–1989
Paul Omodei	Liberal	1989–1996
Warren-Blackwood (1996–2008)
Member	Party	Term
Paul Omodei	Liberal	1996–2008
Paul Omodei	Independent	2008
Warren-Blackwood (2013–present)
Member	Party	Term
Terry Redman	National	2013–2021
Jane Kelsbie	Labor	2021–2025
Bevan Eatts	National	2025-present

== Election results ==
=== Elections in the 2020s ===
2025 Western Australian state election: Warren-Blackwood
Party	Candidate	Votes	%	±%
Labor	Jane Kelsbie	7,184	27.2	−5.0
National	Bevan Eatts	5,757	21.8	−7.2
Liberal	Wade De Campo	5,721	21.6	+8.9
Greens	Julie Marsh	4,407	16.7	+1.9
Legalise Cannabis	Aaron Peet	1,276	4.8	+2.4
One Nation	Stephen James O'Connor	1,144	4.3	+2.8
Christians	Martin Hartigan	525	2.0	+2.0
Shooters, Fishers, Farmers	Paul John Da Silva	428	1.6	−2.3
Total formal votes		26,442	95.9	−0.4
Informal votes		1,141	4.1	+0.4
Turnout		27,583	88.0	+6.5
Two-candidate-preferred result
National	Bevan Eatts	13,683	51.8	+4.0
Labor	Jane Kelsbie	12,733	48.2	−4.0
National gain from Labor		Swing	+4.0	

2021 Western Australian state election: Warren-Blackwood
Party	Candidate	Votes	%	±%
National	Terry Redman	8,219	32.6	−3.6
Labor	Jane Kelsbie	8,197	32.6	+11.7
Greens	Jeff Pow	3,362	13.4	−1.2
Liberal	Marie O'Dea	2,513	10.0	−5.8
Shooters, Fishers, Farmers	Paul Da Silva	1,048	4.2	−1.5
Legalise Cannabis	Nick Lethbridge	588	2.3	+2.3
No Mandatory Vaccination	Helen Allan	526	2.1	+2.1
One Nation	Steven Regterschot	419	1.7	−5.3
Sustainable Australia	Peter Strachan	309	1.2	+1.2
Total formal votes		25,181	96.2	+0.5
Informal votes		994	3.8	−0.5
Turnout		26,175	87.6	−0.8
Two-candidate-preferred result
Labor	Jane Kelsbie	12,903	51.3	+14.1
National	Terry Redman	12,266	48.7	−14.1
Labor gain from National		Swing	+14.1	

=== Elections in the 2010s ===
2017 Western Australian state election: Warren-Blackwood
Party	Candidate	Votes	%	±%
National	Terry Redman	8,639	36.6	−1.2
Labor	Hugh Litson	4,854	20.6	+5.9
Liberal	Ross Woodhouse	3,703	15.7	−11.7
Greens	Andrew Huntley	3,391	14.4	−1.3
One Nation	Greg Moroney	1,641	7.0	+7.0
Shooters, Fishers, Farmers	Marc Deas	1,344	5.7	+5.7
Total formal votes		23,572	95.6	+1.1
Informal votes		1,080	4.4	−1.1
Turnout		24,652	89.1	+0.3
Two-candidate-preferred result
National	Terry Redman	14,942	63.4	+6.3
Labor	Hugh Litson	8,622	36.6	+36.6
National hold		Swing	+6.3	

2013 Western Australian state election: Warren-Blackwood
Party	Candidate	Votes	%	±%
National	Terry Redman	7,439	33.5	+5.7
Liberal	Ray Colyer	6,699	30.2	−3.5
Greens	Nerilee Boshammer	3,612	16.3	+1.2
Labor	John Thorpe	3,331	15.0	−3.2
Independent	Louie Scibilia	425	1.9	+1.9
Family First	Phillip Douglass	403	1.8	+0.2
	Kim Redman	273	1.2	+1.2
Total formal votes		22,182	94.4	–1.4
Informal votes		1,322	5.6	+1.4
Turnout		23,504	91.3	
Two-party-preferred result
Liberal	Ray Colyer	14,542	65.6	+4.8
Labor	John Thorpe	7,637	34.4	–4.8
Two-candidate-preferred result
National	Terry Redman	11,769	53.1	−7.0
Liberal	Ray Colyer	10,393	46.9	+7.0
National hold		Swing	−7.0	

=== Elections in the 2000s ===
2005 Western Australian state election: Warren-Blackwood
Party	Candidate	Votes	%	±%
Liberal	Paul Omodei	7,668	56.8	+9.0
Labor	Peter McKenzie	2,993	22.2	+5.7
Greens	Nick Dornan	1,760	13.0	−0.2
Family First	Garry Cain	385	2.8	+2.8
One Nation	Jodie Yardley	379	2.8	−8.6
New Country	Bob Marshall	207	1.5	+1.5
Christian Democrats	Matt Palmer	119	0.9	+0.9
Total formal votes		13,511	95.0	−1.9
Informal votes		704	5.0	+1.9
Turnout		14,215	91.2	
Two-party-preferred result
Liberal	Paul Omodei	8,774	65.0	+0.3
Labor	Peter McKenzie	4,722	35.0	−0.3
Liberal hold		Swing	+0.3	

2001 Western Australian state election: Warren-Blackwood
Party	Candidate	Votes	%	±%
Liberal	Paul Omodei	6,732	47.7	−14.1
Labor	Veronica Keating	2,338	16.6	−8.0
Greens	Peter Lane	1,853	13.1	+13.1
One Nation	Tony Drake	1,620	11.5	+11.5
Independent	Hayden Rice	1,210	8.6	+8.6
Liberals for Forests	Chris Davies	240	1.7	+1.7
Independent	Allan Martin	130	0.9	+0.9
Total formal votes		14,123	97.0	+0.4
Informal votes		443	3.0	−0.4
Turnout		14,566	92.5	
Two-party-preferred result
Liberal	Paul Omodei	8,955	64.4	−2.7
Labor	Veronica Keating	4,944	35.6	+2.7
Liberal hold		Swing	−2.7	

=== Elections in the 1990s ===
1996 Western Australian state election: Warren-Blackwood
Party	Candidate	Votes	%	±%
Liberal	Paul Omodei	8,033	61.8	−0.9
Labor	Nicholas Oaks	3,198	24.6	+2.2
Democrats	Sally Johnston	1,105	8.5	+8.5
Citizens Electoral Council	Tony Drake	666	5.1	+5.1
Total formal votes		13,002	96.5	−0.3
Informal votes		467	3.5	+0.3
Turnout		13,469	92.1	
Two-party-preferred result
Liberal	Paul Omodei	8,721	67.1	−2.3
Labor	Nicholas Oaks	4,276	32.9	+2.3
Liberal hold		Swing	−2.3	

1993 Western Australian state election: Warren
Party	Candidate	Votes	%	±%
Liberal	Paul Omodei	6,833	65.3	+12.1
Labor	Keith Lillie	2,363	22.6	−14.6
Greens	Peter Akerman	1,263	12.1	+12.1
Total formal votes		10,459	96.7	+1.7
Informal votes		360	3.3	−1.7
Turnout		10,819	95.4	+1.8
Two-party-preferred result
Liberal	Paul Omodei	7,310	69.9	+9.1
Labor	Keith Lillie	3,149	30.1	−9.1
Liberal hold		Swing	+9.1	

=== Elections in the 1980s ===
1989 Western Australian state election: Warren
Party	Candidate	Votes	%	±%
Liberal	Paul Omodei	5,105	53.2	+3.6
Labor	John Towie	3,568	37.2	−10.5
National	Donald Hancock	928	9.7	+9.7
Total formal votes		9,601	95.0	
Informal votes		504	5.0	
Turnout		10,105	93.6	
Two-party-preferred result
Liberal	Paul Omodei	5,838	60.8	+9.8
Labor	John Towie	3,763	39.2	−9.8
Liberal hold		Swing	+9.8	

- In the redistribution, Warren became a notional Liberal seat.

1986 Western Australian state election: Warren
Party	Candidate	Votes	%	±%
Labor	David Evans	4,140	51.2	−9.6
Liberal	Paul Omodei	3,671	45.4	+14.6
Independent	Charles Parke	272	3.4	+3.4
Total formal votes		8,083	98.0	+0.6
Informal votes		162	2.0	−0.6
Turnout		8,245	94.1	+2.8
Two-party-preferred result
Labor	David Evans	4,276	52.9	−10.5
Liberal	Paul Omodei	3,807	47.1	+10.5
Labor hold		Swing	−10.5	

1983 Western Australian state election: Warren
Party	Candidate	Votes	%	±%
Labor	David Evans	4,442	60.8	
Liberal	Ross Young	2,250	30.8	
National Country	Noel Klopper	477	6.5	
Independent	Noel Duggan	133	1.8	
Total formal votes		7,302	97.4	
Informal votes		198	2.6	
Turnout		7,500	91.3	
Two-party-preferred result
Labor	David Evans	4,629	63.4	
Liberal	Ross Young	2,673	36.6	
Labor hold		Swing		

1980 Western Australian state election: Warren
Party	Candidate	Votes	%	±%
Labor	David Evans	5,126	62.5	+8.6
Liberal	Graham Happ	3,080	37.5	−4.7
Total formal votes		8,206	97.2	−1.1
Informal votes		232	2.8	+1.1
Turnout		8,438	91.6	−1.3
Labor hold		Swing	+6.7	

=== Elections in the 1970s ===
1977 Western Australian state election: Warren
Party	Candidate	Votes	%	±%
Labor	David Evans	4,306	53.9	
Liberal	Bill King	3,374	42.2	
Independent	Noel Duggen	308	3.9	
Total formal votes		7,988	98.3	
Informal votes		137	1.7	
Turnout		8,125	92.9	
Two-party-preferred result
Labor	Hywel Evans	4,460	55.8	+3.3
Liberal	Bill King	3,528	44.2	−3.3
Labor hold		Swing	+3.3	

1974 Western Australian state election: Warren
Party	Candidate	Votes	%	±%
Labor	David Evans	3,453	52.1	
Liberal	Maurice Thompson	2,089	31.5	
National Alliance	John Dempster	1,092	16.5	
Total formal votes		6,634	96.6	
Informal votes		233	3.4	
Turnout		6,867	92.8	
Two-party-preferred result
Labor	David Evans	3,617	54.5	
Liberal	Maurice Thompson	3,017	45.5	
Labor hold		Swing		

1971 Western Australian state election: Warren
Party	Candidate	Votes	%	±%
Labor	David Evans	4,271	71.1	+15.8
Liberal	Murray Edwards	1,418	23.6	−17.0
Democratic Labor	Alfred Whiteside	321	5.3	+1.2
Total formal votes		6,010	96.9	−1.4
Informal votes		195	3.1	+1.4
Turnout		6,205	93.0	−1.5
Two-party-preferred result
Labor	David Evans	4,319	71.9	+14.5
Liberal	Murray Edwards	1,691	28.1	−14.5
Labor hold		Swing	+14.5	

=== Elections in the 1960s ===
1968 Western Australian state election: Warren
Party	Candidate	Votes	%	±%
Labor	David Evans	3,175	55.3	
Liberal and Country	Gordon Thompson	2,331	40.6	
Democratic Labor	Francis Dwyer	235	4.1	
Total formal votes		5,741	98.3	
Informal votes		97	1.7	
Turnout		5,838	94.5	
Two-party-preferred result
Labor	David Evans	6,122	58.8	
Liberal and Country	Gordon Thompson	4,289	41.2	
Labor hold		Swing		

1965 Western Australian state election: Warren
Party	Candidate	Votes	%	±%
Labor	Joseph Rowberry	2,491	52.3	−3.6
Liberal and Country	William Brockman	1,887	39.6	−4.5
Country	Gordon Errington	381	8.0	+8.0
Total formal votes		4,759	97.4	−1.6
Informal votes		126	2.6	+1.6
Turnout		4,885	94.5	+0.4
Two-party-preferred result
Labor	Joseph Rowberry	2,529	53.1	−2.8
Liberal and Country	William Brockman	2,230	46.9	+2.8
Labor hold		Swing	−2.8	

1962 Western Australian state election: Warren
Party	Candidate	Votes	%	±%
Labor	Joseph Rowberry	2,831	55.9	
Liberal and Country	Walter Muir	2,231	44.1	
Total formal votes		5,062	99.0	
Informal votes		52	1.0	
Turnout		5,114	94.1	
Labor hold		Swing		

=== Elections in the 1950s ===
1959 Western Australian state election: Warren
Party	Candidate	Votes	%	±%
Labor	Joseph Rowberry	2,684	53.4	−46.6
Liberal and Country	Walter Muir	2,025	40.3	+40.3
Democratic Labor	Paul Brennan	319	6.4	+6.4
Total formal votes		5,028	98.9	
Informal votes		55	1.1	
Turnout		5,083	96.6	
Two-party-preferred result
Labor	Joseph Rowberry		54.3	−45.7
Liberal and Country	Walter Muir		45.7	+45.7
Labor hold		Swing	N/A	

- Two party preferred vote was estimated.

1958 Warren state by-election
Party	Candidate	Votes	%	±%
Labor	Joseph Rowberry	2,107	46.6	N/A
Liberal and Country	Frederick Wiseman	1,198	26.5	+26.5
Country	Andrew Dempster	455	10.0	+10.0
Democratic Labor	David Carrier	327	7.2	+7.2
Independent	Walter Whyte	237	5.2	+5.2
Independent	Albert Halden	181	4.0	+4.0
Independent Liberal	James Collins	21	0.5	+0.5
Total formal votes		4,526	96.7	
Informal votes		156	3.3	
Turnout		4,682	92.2	
After distribution of preferences
Labor	Joseph Rowberry	2,318	51.2	
Liberal and Country	Frederick Wiseman	1,274	28.1	
Country	Andrew Dempster	528	11.7	
Democratic Labor	David Carrier	406	9.0	
Labor hold		Swing	N/A	

- Preferences were not distributed to completion.

1956 Western Australian state election: Warren
Party	Candidate	Votes	%	±%
Labor	Ernest Hoar	unopposed		
Labor hold		Swing		

1953 Western Australian state election: Warren
Party	Candidate	Votes	%	±%
Labor	Ernest Hoar	unopposed		
Labor hold		Swing		

1950 Western Australian state election: Warren
Party	Candidate	Votes	%	±%
Labor	Ernest Hoar	unopposed		
Labor hold		Swing		
