= Results of the 2008 Western Australian state election (Legislative Assembly) =

End results of political campaigns

Western Australian state election, 6 September 2008 Legislative Assembly << 2005–2013 >>
Enrolled voters	1,330,399				
Votes cast	1,150,497		Turnout	86.48%	–3.36%
Informal votes	61,200		Informal	5.32%	+0.08%
Summary of votes by party
Party	Primary votes	%	Swing	Seats	Change
Liberal	418,208	38.39	+2.76	24	+ 6
Labor	390,339	35.84	–6.05	28	– 4
Greens	129,827	11.92	+4.35	0	± 0
National	53,086	4.87	+1.18	4	– 1
Christian Democrats	28,079	2.58	–0.36	0	± 0
Family First	21,204	1.95	–0.08	0	± 0
Citizens Electoral Council	1,161	0.11	+0.02	0	± 0
Independent	47,353	4.35	+0.19	3	+ 1
Total	1,089,257			59	
Two-party-preferred
Liberal/National	564,490	51.85%	+4.13%		
Labor	524,149	48.15%	–4.13%		

This is a list of electoral district results of the 2008 Western Australian election.

== Results by electoral district ==
=== Albany ===
2008 Western Australian state election: Albany
Party	Candidate	Votes	%	±%
Labor	Peter Watson	7,709	39.14	+2.5
Liberal	Andrew Partington	6,486	32.93	−2.7
National	Sam Harma	2,628	13.34	+5.2
Greens	Diane Evers	1,492	7.58	+1.7
Christian Democrats	Justin Moseley	950	4.82	+0.8
Family First	Colin Pyle	431	2.19	−0.7
Total formal votes		19,696	97.09	+1.30
Informal votes		590	2.91	−1.30
Turnout		20,286	90.13	
Two-party-preferred result
Labor	Peter Watson	9,884	50.23	+2.5
Liberal	Andrew Partington	9,795	49.77	–2.5
Labor gain from Liberal		Swing	+2.5	

=== Alfred Cove ===
2008 Western Australian state election: Alfred Cove
Party	Candidate	Votes	%	±%
Liberal	Chris Back	8,628	43.14	+5.20
Independent	Janet Woollard	5,094	25.47	+1.51
Labor	Catherine Barratt	4,059	20.29	−2.55
Greens	Michael Bennett	1,907	9.53	+3.17
Christian Democrats	Stephen Wardell-Johnson	314	1.57	−0.54
Total formal votes		20,002	95.96	−0.54
Informal votes		843	4.04	+0.54
Turnout		20,845	88.38	−3.47
Two-candidate-preferred result
Independent	Janet Woollard	10,200	51.01	−3.56
Liberal	Chris Back	9,795	48.99	+3.56
Independent hold		Swing	−3.56	

=== Armadale ===
2008 Western Australian state election: Armadale
Party	Candidate	Votes	%	±%
Labor	Alannah MacTiernan	10,899	55.96	−0.1
Liberal	Steven Innes	5,050	25.93	+1.2
Greens	Caroline Wielinga	2,107	10.82	+6.0
Christian Democrats	Kevin Swarts	1,422	7.30	+1.5
Total formal votes		19,478	94.04	
Informal votes		1,235	5.96	
Turnout		20,713	85.88	
Two-party-preferred result
Labor	Alannah MacTiernan	12,628	64.85	+0.6
Liberal	Steven Innes	6,845	35.15	−0.6
Labor hold		Swing	+0.6	

=== Balcatta ===
2008 Western Australian state election: Balcatta
Party	Candidate	Votes	%	±%
Labor	John Kobelke	7,897	42.10	−9.7
Liberal	Chris Hatton	7,682	40.95	+6.6
Greens	Irma Lachmund	2,110	11.25	+2.6
Christian Democrats	Peter Schofield	692	3.69	−1.4
Family First	Inge George	377	2.01	+2.01
Total formal votes		18,758	93.05	
Informal votes		1,402	6.95	
Turnout		20,160	86.28	
Two-party-preferred result
Labor	John Kobelke	9,804	52.30	−6.9
Liberal	Chris Hatton	8,941	47.70	+6.9
Labor hold		Swing	−6.9	

=== Bassendean ===
2008 Western Australian state election: Bassendean
Party	Candidate	Votes	%	±%
Labor	Martin Whitely	8,973	47.80	−6.2
Liberal	Benjamin Smith	5,751	30.64	+4.1
Greens	Jennie Carter	2,999	15.98	+7.4
Christian Democrats	Paul Mewhor	1,049	5.59	+2.1
Total formal votes		18,772	92.44	−0.88
Informal votes		1,535	7.56	+0.88
Turnout		20,307	87.92	
Two-party-preferred result
Labor	Martin Whitely	11,320	60.33	−1.5
Liberal	Benjamin Smith	7,442	39.67	+1.5
Labor hold		Swing	−1.5	

=== Bateman ===
2008 Western Australian state election: Bateman
Party	Candidate	Votes	%	±%
Liberal	Christian Porter	10,541	53.40	+5.1
Labor	Tony Stokes	5,538	28.05	−5.8
Greens	Andrea Callaghan	2,562	12.98	+6.0
Christian Democrats	Ka-ren Chew	750	3.80	+0.3
Independent	Won-Sik Choi	350	1.77	+1.77
Total formal votes		19,741	95.67	
Informal votes		893	4.33	
Turnout		20,634	89.59	
Two-party-preferred result^{[1]}
Liberal	Christian Porter	12,116	61.39	+4.5
Labor	Tony Stokes	7,620	38.61	−4.5
Liberal hold		Swing	+4.5	

=== Belmont ===
2008 Western Australian state election: Belmont
Party	Candidate	Votes	%	±%
Labor	Eric Ripper	7,650	43.54	−10.6
Liberal	Edward Richards	5,953	33.88	+2.9
Greens	Louise Judge	2,143	12.20	+4.5
Family First	John Yarrow	677	3.85	+3.85
Independent	John Gleeson	603	3.43	+3.43
Christian Democrats	Tasman Gilbert	543	3.09	−1.0
Total formal votes		17,569	92.99	
Informal votes		1,325	7.01	
Turnout		18,894	85.46	
Two-party-preferred result
Labor	Eric Ripper	9,962	56.74	−5.0
Liberal	Edward Richards	7,596	43.26	+5.0
Labor hold		Swing	−5.0	

=== Blackwood-Stirling ===
2008 Western Australian state election: Blackwood-Stirling
Party	Candidate	Votes	%	±%
National	Terry Redman	8,003	44.91	+28.4
Liberal	Wade de Campo	4,518	25.35	−15.6
Labor	Raymond Phillips	2,527	14.18	−4.7
Greens	Luke Petersen	1,837	10.31	+1.1
Christian Democrats	Graham Lawn	350	1.96	+0.3
Family First	Stephen Carson	264	1.48	−1.0
Independent	Ken Gunson	176	0.99	+0.99
Independent	Keith Smith	145	0.81	+0.81
Total formal votes		17,820	96.14	
Informal votes		715	3.86	
Turnout		18,535	89.44	
Two-candidate-preferred result
National	Terry Redman	11,992	67.34	N/A
Liberal	Wade de Campo	5,816	32.66	N/A
National hold		Swing	N/A	

=== Bunbury ===
2008 Western Australian state election: Bunbury
Party	Candidate	Votes	%	±%
Liberal	John Castrilli	9,400	53.58	+12.2
Labor	Peter MacFarlane	5,192	29.60	−12.7
Greens	Peter Eckersley	1,591	9.07	+3.0
Family First	Mandy Roberts	1,009	5.75	+1.9
Christian Democrats	Edward Dabrowski	351	2.00	+0.7
Total formal votes		17,543	95.35	
Informal votes		856	4.65	
Turnout		18,399	83.87	
Two-party-preferred result
Liberal	John Castrilli	10,825	61.73	+12.6
Labor	Peter MacFarlane	6,711	38.27	−12.6
Liberal hold		Swing	+12.6	

=== Cannington ===
2008 Western Australian state election: Cannington
Party	Candidate	Votes	%	±%
Labor	Bill Johnston	8,475	45.44	−8.9
Liberal	Ryan Chorley	6,105	32.73	+3.3
Greens	Christine Cunningham	3,045	16.32	+9.3
Christian Democrats	Mark Staer	1,028	5.51	+1.6
Total formal votes		18,653	93.02	
Informal votes		1,399	6.98	
Turnout		20,052	86.44	
Two-party-preferred result^{[1]}
Labor	Bill Johnston	11,003	59.04	−4.3
Liberal	Ryan Chorley	7,633	40.96	+4.3
Labor hold		Swing	−4.3	

=== Carine ===
2008 Western Australian state election: Carine
Party	Candidate	Votes	%	±%
Liberal	Tony Krsticevic	8,733	43.83	−7.6
Labor	James Benson-Lidholm	4,383	22.00	−11.3
Independent	Bill Stewart	3,572	17.93	+17.93
Greens	Ross Copeland	2,246	11.27	+1.0
Christian Democrats	Henri Chew	380	1.91	−2.1
Independent	Wayne Thompson	316	1.59	+1.59
Family First	Peter Rose	295	1.48	+1.0
Total formal votes		19,925	95.72	
Informal votes		890	4.28	
Turnout		20,815	88.98	
Two-party-preferred result^{[1]}
Liberal	Tony Krsticevic	12,832	64.48	+6.8
Labor	James Benson-Lidholm	7,070	35.52	−6.8
Liberal hold		Swing	+6.8	

=== Central Wheatbelt ===
2008 Western Australian state election: Central Wheatbelt
Party	Candidate	Votes	%	±%
National	Brendon Grylls	8,334	47.79	−7.1
Liberal	Stephen Strange	4,471	25.64	+11.9
Labor	Gerry Sturman	2,909	16.68	+1.7
Greens	Yvonne Dols	996	5.71	+1.5
Christian Democrats	Ross Patterson	573	3.29	+0.9
Citizens Electoral Council	Judy Sudholz	155	0.89	+0.89
Total formal votes		17,438	96.01	
Informal votes		724	3.99	
Turnout		18,162	88.63	
Two-candidate-preferred result
National	Brendon Grylls	11,806	67.92	N/A
Liberal	Stephen Strange	5,577	32.08	N/A
National hold		Swing	N/A	

=== Churchlands ===
2008 Western Australian state election: Churchlands
Party	Candidate	Votes	%	±%
Independent	Liz Constable	13,326	67.30	+36.2
Labor	Sinisa Krstic	3,545	17.90	−4.9
Greens	George Crisp	2,931	14.80	+5.0
Total formal votes		19,802	96.70	
Informal votes		676	3.30	
Turnout		20,478	87.52	
Two-candidate-preferred result
Independent	Liz Constable	14,549	73.47	+4.7
Labor	Sinisa Krstic	5,253	26.53	−4.7
Independent hold		Swing	+4.7	

=== Cockburn ===
2008 Western Australian state election: Cockburn
Party	Candidate	Votes	%	±%
Labor	Fran Logan	9,620	48.70	−4.1
Liberal	Donald Barrett	6,188	31.32	+6.2
Greens	Andrew Sullivan	2,531	12.81	+5.9
Independent	Mary Jenkins	1,416	7.17	+7.2
Total formal votes		19,755	92.43	+1.3
Informal votes		1,617	7.57	−1.3
Turnout		21,372	87.45	
Two-party-preferred result
Labor	Fran Logan	11,773	59.60	−5.2
Liberal	Donald Barrett	7,982	40.40	+5.2
Labor hold		Swing	−5.2	

=== Collie-Preston ===
2008 Western Australian state election: Collie-Preston
Party	Candidate	Votes	%	±%
Labor	Mick Murray	8,439	41.00	−1.3
Liberal	Steve Thomas	8,260	40.13	+2.4
Greens	Richard Chapman	1,802	8.75	+2.7
Family First	Keith Hopper	1,534	7.45	+4.6
Christian Democrats	Wayne Barnett	548	2.66	+1.2
Total formal votes		20,583	95.46	
Informal votes		979	4.54	
Turnout		21,562	90.33	
Two-party-preferred result
Labor	Mick Murray	10,494	51.00	+0.1
Liberal	Steve Thomas	10,083	49.00	−0.1
Labor hold		Swing	+0.1	

=== Cottesloe ===
2008 Western Australian state election: Cottesloe
Party	Candidate	Votes	%	±%
Liberal	Colin Barnett	12,552	63.45	+7.8
Labor	Dave Hume	3,470	17.54	−7.0
Greens	Greg Boland	3,366	17.02	+0.1
Christian Democrats	Pat Seymour	393	1.99	−1.1
Total formal votes		19,781	95.74	
Informal votes		880	4.26	
Turnout		20.661	85.96	
Two-party-preferred result
Liberal	Colin Barnett	13,729	69.42	+7.9
Labor	Dave Hume	6,047	30.58	−7.9
Liberal hold		Swing	+7.9	

=== Darling Range ===
2008 Western Australian state election: Darling Range
Party	Candidate	Votes	%	±%
Liberal	Tony Simpson	9513	46.80	+5.9
Labor	Lisa Griffiths	6,893	33.91	−7.7
Greens	Denise Hardie	2,913	14.33	+7.3
Christian Democrats	Rachel Cabrera	1,010	4.97	+1.3
Total formal votes		20,329	94.54	−1.08
Informal votes		1,173	5.46	+1.08
Turnout		21,502	89.32	−2.95
Two-party-preferred result
Liberal	Tony Simpson	11,292	55.6	+6.3
Labor	Lisa Griffiths	9,030	44.4	−6.3
Liberal hold		Swing	+6.3	

=== Dawesville ===
2008 Western Australian state election: Dawesville
Party	Candidate	Votes	%	±%
Liberal	Kim Hames	9,836	55.74	+12.8
Labor	Marion Blair	5,832	33.05	−9.0
Greens	Rebecca Brown	1,191	6.75	+2.7
Family First	Andrew Newhouse	460	2.61	−0.1
Christian Democrats	Mike Sutton-Smith	233	1.32	+0.3
Citizens Electoral Council	Roger Blakeway	93	0.53	+0.3
Total formal votes		17,645	95.28	
Informal votes		874	4.72	
Turnout		18,519	85.49	−4.81
Two-party-preferred result
Liberal	Kim Hames	10,776	61.11	+6.96
Labor	Marion Blair	6,857	38.89	−6.96
Liberal hold		Swing	+9.4	

=== Eyre ===
2008 Western Australian state election: Eyre
Party	Candidate	Votes	%	±%
Liberal	Graham Jacobs	6,515	46.1	+0.5
National	Suzie Williams	3,754	26.6	+9.9
Labor	John Keogh	2,745	19.4	−9.0
Greens	Linda Parker	1,019	7.2	+3.6
Citizens Electoral Council	Arthur Edward Harvey	104	0.7	+0.7
Total formal votes		14,137	94.9	−0.9
Informal votes		757	5.1	+0.9
Turnout		14,894	83.7	
Two-candidate-preferred result
Liberal	Graham Jacobs	7,578	53.6	−11.2
National	Suzie Williams	6,550	46.4	+46.4
Liberal hold		Swing	−11.2	

=== Forrestfield ===
2008 Western Australian state election: Forrestfield
Party	Candidate	Votes	%	±%
Liberal	Nathan Morton	8,153	40.9	+3.4
Labor	Andrew Waddell	7,884	39.5	−6.1
Greens	Owen Davies	2,488	12.5	+5.8
Family First	Lisa Saladine	747	3.7	+1.1
Christian Democrats	Joel Hammen	672	3.4	−0.6
Total formal votes		19,944	93.5	−0.9
Informal votes		1,394	6.5	+0.9
Turnout		21,338	88.0	
Two-party-preferred result
Labor	Andrew Waddell	10,017	50.2	−4.3
Liberal	Nathan Morton	9,919	49.8	+4.3
Labor hold		Swing	−4.3	

=== Fremantle ===
2008 Western Australian state election: Fremantle
Party	Candidate	Votes	%	±%
Labor	Jim McGinty	7,286	38.7	−5.1
Liberal	Brian Christie	5,689	30.2	+3.4
Greens	Adele Carles	5,191	27.6	+10.5
Christian Democrats	Julie Hollett	350	1.9	+0.2
Family First	Andriétte Du Plessis	318	1.7	−0.1
Total formal votes		18,834	94.3	+1.9
Informal votes		1,132	5.7	−1.9
Turnout		19,966	84.4	
Two-party-preferred result
Labor	Jim McGinty	11,667	62.0	−2.1
Liberal	Brian Christie	7,147	38.0	+2.1
Labor hold		Swing	−2.1	

=== Geraldton ===
2008 Western Australian state election: Geraldton
Party	Candidate	Votes	%	±%
Liberal	Ian Blayney	6,616	36.9	−2.0
Labor	Shane Hill	5,213	29.1	−9.4
National	Andrew Short	3,460	19.3	+9.0
Family First	Jane Foreman	1,036	5.8	+5.8
Greens	Adam Volkerts	1,030	5.8	+0.8
Christian Democrats	Philip Sprigg	551	3.1	−0.4
Total formal votes		17,906	95.7	+0.4
Informal votes		812	4.3	−0.4
Turnout		18,718	87.5	
Two-party-preferred result
Liberal	Ian Blayney	10,467	58.5	+5.0
Labor	Shane Hill	7,420	41.5	−5.0
Liberal gain from Labor		Swing	+5.0	

=== Girrawheen ===
2008 Western Australian state election: Girrawheen
Party	Candidate	Votes	%	±%
Labor	Margaret Quirk	9,155	51.1	+0.8
Liberal	John Halligan	6,109	34.1	+11.5
Greens	Tamara Desiatov	2,658	14.8	+9.3
Total formal votes		17,922	91.9	−1.1
Informal votes		1,587	8.1	+1.1
Turnout		19,509	85.4	
Two-party-preferred result
Labor	Margaret Quirk	11,014	61.5	−7.6
Liberal	John Halligan	6,905	38.5	+7.6
Labor hold		Swing	−7.6	

=== Gosnells ===
2008 Western Australian state election: Gosnells
Party	Candidate	Votes	%	±%
Labor	Chris Tallentire	7,874	42.9	−9.1
Liberal	Chris Fernandez	6,453	35.2	+6.1
Greens	Luke Edmonds	2,251	12.3	+6.1
Christian Democrats	Madeleine Goiran	923	5.0	+0.7
Family First	Dave Bolt	846	4.6	+0.7
Total formal votes		18,347	93.9	+0.2
Informal votes		1,183	6.1	−0.2
Turnout		19,530	86.8	
Two-party-preferred result
Labor	Chris Tallentire	10,172	55.5	−5.9
Liberal	Chris Fernandez	8,162	44.5	+5.9
Labor hold		Swing	−5.9	

=== Hillarys ===
2008 Western Australian state election: Hillarys
Party	Candidate	Votes	%	±%
Liberal	Rob Johnson	10,471	52.9	+7.4
Labor	Kym Endersby	5,633	28.4	−8.0
Greens	Barry Redhead	2,610	13.2	+5.0
Christian Democrats	Norman Henley	572	2.9	−0.2
Family First	Moyna Rapp	522	2.6	−0.9
Total formal votes		19,808	94.9	−0.3
Informal votes		1,071	5.1	+0.3
Turnout		20,879	88.2	
Two-party-preferred result
Liberal	Rob Johnson	12,145	61.4	+7.8
Labor	Kym Endersby	7,648	38.6	−7.8
Liberal hold		Swing	+7.8	

=== Jandakot ===
2008 Western Australian state election: Jandakot
Party	Candidate	Votes	%	±%
Liberal	Joe Francis	9,176	44.5	+5.8
Labor	Anne Wood	7,630	37.0	−7.2
Greens	Serena Breadmore	2,418	11.7	+4.9
Family First	Damon Fowler	808	3.9	+0.5
Christian Democrats	Bill Heggers	585	2.8	+0.2
Total formal votes		20,617	95.2	+0.4
Informal votes		1,040	4.8	−0.4
Turnout		21,657	89.6	+0.4
Two-party-preferred result
Liberal	Joe Francis	10,680	51.8	+5.5
Labor	Anne Wood	9,920	48.2	−5.5
Liberal gain from Labor		Swing	+5.5	

=== Joondalup ===
2008 Western Australian state election: Joondalup
Party	Candidate	Votes	%	±%
Labor	Tony O'Gorman	7,788	41.8	−3.8
Liberal	Milly Zuvela	7,083	38.1	+1.0
Greens	Anibeth Desierto	2,431	13.1	+5.8
Family First	Nathan Clifford	711	3.8	+0.6
Christian Democrats	Margaret Laundy	600	3.2	+0.8
Total formal votes		18,613	94.4	−0.6
Informal votes		1,101	5.6	+0.6
Turnout		19,714	85.9	
Two-party-preferred result
Labor	Tony O'Gorman	9,950	53.5	−0.8
Liberal	Milly Zuvela	8,655	46.5	+0.8
Labor hold		Swing	−0.8	

=== Kalamunda ===
2008 Western Australian state election: Kalamunda
Party	Candidate	Votes	%	±%
Liberal	John Day	9,257	47.6	+4.5
Labor	Juliana Plummer	6,121	31.5	−8.3
Greens	Toni Warden	2,871	14.8	+6.0
Christian Democrats	Rob Merrells	806	4.1	+0.5
Family First	Ian Hopkinson	401	2.1	−0.3
Total formal votes		19,456	94.4	−0.8
Informal votes		1,158	5.6	+0.8
Turnout		20,614	87.7	
Two-party-preferred result
Liberal	John Day	10,939	56.3	+6.1
Labor	Juliana Plummer	8,508	43.8	−6.1
Liberal hold		Swing	+6.1	

=== Kalgoorlie ===
2008 Western Australian state election: Kalgoorlie
Party	Candidate	Votes	%	±%
Independent	John Bowler	3,466	34.0	+34.0
Liberal	Nat James	2,540	24.9	−26.0
National	Tony Crook	1,942	19.0	+19.0
Labor	Mathew Cuomo	1,790	17.6	−19.6
Greens	Andy Huntley	461	4.5	+0.2
Total formal votes		10,199	94.4	−1.5
Informal votes		605	5.6	+1.5
Turnout		10,804	76.4	
Two-candidate-preferred result
Independent	John Bowler	5,462	53.6	+53.6
National	Tony Crook	4,731	46.4	+46.4
Independent gain from Liberal		Swing	N/A	

=== Kimberley ===
2008 Western Australian state election: Kimberley
Party	Candidate	Votes	%	±%
Labor	Carol Martin	4,066	41.2	−1.0
Liberal	Ruth Webb-Smith	2,566	26.0	−8.9
National	John McCourt	1,809	18.3	+18.3
Greens	Annabelle Sandes	1,320	13.4	+0.1
Citizens Electoral Council	James Ockerby	100	1.0	+1.0
Total formal votes		9,861	95.5	
Informal votes		463	4.5	
Turnout		10,324	62.0	
Two-party-preferred result
Labor	Carol Martin	5,587	56.8	−0.1
Liberal	Ruth Webb-Smith	4,257	43.2	+0.1
Labor hold		Swing	−0.1	

=== Kingsley ===
2008 Western Australian state election: Kingsley
Party	Candidate	Votes	%	±%
Liberal	Andrea Mitchell	9,710	47.7	+10.1
Labor	Judy Hughes	7,230	35.5	−1.2
Greens	Diana MacTiernan	2,289	11.3	+5.3
Christian Democrats	Bronwyn Phipson	571	2.8	−0.2
Family First	Frank Hultgren	545	2.7	+0.3
Total formal votes		20,345	95.1	−0.1
Informal votes		1,052	4.9	+0.1
Turnout		21,397	90.5	
Two-party-preferred result
Liberal	Andrea Mitchell	11,085	54.5	+4.6
Labor	Judy Hughes	9,252	45.5	−4.6
Liberal gain from Labor		Swing	+4.6	

=== Kwinana ===
2008 Western Australian state election: Kwinana
Party	Candidate	Votes	%	±%
Labor	Roger Cook	7,990	42.0	−17.6
Independent	Carol Adams	4,364	23.0	+23.0
Liberal	Alexander Bellotti	3,590	18.9	−3.4
Greens	Dawn Jecks	2,030	10.7	+4.6
Family First	Malcolm George	719	3.8	−0.5
Independent	Peter Lambert	318	1.7	+1.7
Total formal votes		19,011	94.3	+0.5
Informal votes		1,149	5.7	−0.5
Turnout		20,160	85.8	
Notional two-party-preferred count
Labor	Roger Cook	12,845	67.6	−1.6
Liberal	Alexander Bellotti	6,162	32.4	+1.6
Two-candidate-preferred result
Labor	Roger Cook	9,648	50.8	−18.4
Independent	Carol Adams	9,348	49.2	+49.2
Labor hold		Swing	−18.4	

=== Mandurah ===
2008 Western Australian state election: Mandurah
Party	Candidate	Votes	%	±%
Labor	David Templeman	9,188	52.9	+0.0
Liberal	Les Atkins	5,922	34.1	−0.7
Greens	Clare Nunan	1,067	6.1	+2.5
Family First	Rhonda Hamersley	657	3.8	+1.2
Christian Democrats	Michelle Shave	437	2.5	+1.2
Citizens Electoral Council	Keith Hallam	98	0.6	+0.0
Total formal votes		17,369	94.6	+0.1
Informal votes		995	5.4	−0.1
Turnout		18,364	87.0	
Two-party-preferred result
Labor	David Templeman	10,494	60.5	+2.0
Liberal	Les Atkins	6,864	39.5	−2.0
Labor hold		Swing	+2.0	

=== Maylands ===
2008 Western Australian state election: Maylands
Party	Candidate	Votes	%	±%
Labor	Lisa Baker	8,065	43.7	−10.8
Liberal	Ainslie Gatt	6,270	33.9	+7.4
Greens	Hsien Harper	3,524	19.1	+7.2
Christian Democrats	Dunstan Hartley	614	3.3	−0.4
Total formal votes		18,473	93.7	−0.6
Informal votes		1,241	6.3	+0.6
Turnout		19,714	84.7	
Two-party-preferred result
Labor	Lisa Baker	10,899	59.0	−8.4
Liberal	Ainslie Gatt	7,572	41.0	+8.4
Labor hold		Swing	−8.4	

=== Midland ===
2008 Western Australian state election: Midland
Party	Candidate	Votes	%	±%
Labor	Michelle Roberts	8,968	46.8	−1.8
Liberal	Peter McDowell	6,645	34.7	+0.6
Greens	Caz Bowman	2,869	15.0	+4.5
Christian Democrats	Lukas Butler	687	3.6	+0.0
Total formal votes		19,169	93.6	−0.9
Informal votes		1,304	6.4	+0.9
Turnout		20,473	86.9	
Two-party-preferred result
Labor	Michelle Roberts	11,174	58.3	−1.3
Liberal	Peter McDowell	7,977	41.7	+1.3
Labor hold		Swing	−1.3	

=== Mindarie ===
2008 Western Australian state election: Mindarie
Party	Candidate	Votes	%	±%
Labor	John Quigley	9,288	48.6	−1.1
Liberal	Murray McLennan	6,839	35.8	−0.7
Greens	Johannes Herrmann	1,949	10.2	+4.2
Family First	Daniel Storey	644	3.4	+0.0
Christian Democrats	Amanda Varley	401	2.1	−0.1
Total formal votes		19,121	94.8	+0.4
Informal votes		1,052	5.2	−0.4
Turnout		20,173	85.4	
Two-party-preferred result
Labor	John Quigley	11,184	58.5	+1.6
Liberal	Murray McLennan	7,930	41.5	−1.6
Labor hold		Swing	+1.6	

=== Moore ===
2008 Western Australian state election: Moore
Party	Candidate	Votes	%	±%
Liberal	Gary Snook	7,556	40.5	−2.2
National	Grant Woodhams	6,025	32.3	+9.9
Labor	Peter Johnson	3,105	16.7	−3.4
Greens	Des Pike	1,157	6.2	+0.8
Family First	Boyd Davey	389	2.1	+2.1
Christian Democrats	Bernie Wallace	317	1.7	−0.2
	David Shier	49	0.3	+0.3
Citizens Electoral Council	Norman Gay	45	0.2	+0.2
Total formal votes		18,643	95.3	+0.4
Informal votes		918	4.7	−0.4
Turnout		19,561	87.8	
Two-candidate-preferred result
National	Grant Woodhams	9,884	53.1	+5.9
Liberal	Gary Snook	8,742	46.9	−5.9
National gain from Liberal		Swing	+5.9	

=== Morley ===
2008 Western Australian state election: Morley
Party	Candidate	Votes	%	±%
Labor	Reece Whitby	7,010	35.7	−15.9
Liberal	Ian Britza	6,797	34.7	+1.1
Independent	John D'Orazio	3,145	16.0	+16.0
Greens	Sally Palmer	1,687	8.6	+2.6
Christian Democrats	Andrew Partington	635	3.2	−0.7
Independent	Azeem Shah	337	1.7	+1.7
Total formal votes		19,611	93.6	+0.3
Informal votes		1,340	6.4	−0.3
Turnout		20,951	89.2	
Two-party-preferred result
Liberal	Ian Britza	9,969	50.9	+10.8
Labor	Reece Whitby	9,629	49.1	−10.8
Liberal gain from Labor		Swing	+10.8	

=== Mount Lawley ===
2008 Western Australian state election: Mount Lawley
Party	Candidate	Votes	%	±%
Liberal	Michael Sutherland	8,607	46.4	+8.1
Labor	Karen Brown	6,487	35.0	−10.5
Greens	Chris Dickinson	2,639	14.2	+4.9
Christian Democrats	Paul Connelly	516	2.8	+0.0
Family First	Kay Warwick	305	1.6	+0.1
Total formal votes		18,554	94.6	
Informal votes		1,049	5.4	
Turnout		19,603	85.7	
Two-party-preferred result
Liberal	Michael Sutherland	9,680	52.2	+8.1
Labor	Karen Brown	8,865	47.8	−8.1
Liberal gain from Labor		Swing	+8.1	

=== Murray-Wellington ===
2008 Western Australian state election: Murray-Wellington
Party	Candidate	Votes	%	±%
Liberal	Murray Cowper	8,713	44.4	+1.1
Labor	Anthony Marinovich	5,824	29.6	−5.7
National	Michael Rose	1,643	8.4	+0.8
Greens	Deni Fuller	1,374	7.0	+2.5
Family First	David Bolt	1,232	6.3	+4.7
Christian Democrats	Vivian Hill	415	2.1	+0.2
Independent	Alycia Bermingham	216	1.1	+1.1
Independent	Kevin Cloghan	143	0.7	+0.7
Citizens Electoral Council	Brian McCarthy	85	0.4	+0.2
Total formal votes		19,645	94.1	−0.4
Informal votes		1,234	5.9	+0.4
Turnout		20,879	87.8	
Two-party-preferred result
Liberal	Murray Cowper	11,467	58.4	+2.4
Labor	Anthony Marinovich	8,154	41.6	−2.4
Liberal hold		Swing	+2.4	

=== Nedlands ===
2008 Western Australian state election: Nedlands
Party	Candidate	Votes	%	±%
Liberal	Bill Marmion	8,889	45.5	−8.3
Independent	Sue Walker	4,449	22.8	+22.8
Labor	Colin Cochrane	3,098	15.8	−10.2
Greens	Lee Hemsley	2,754	14.1	−1.8
Christian Democrats	Gail Forder	233	1.2	−1.3
Family First	Brian Langenberg	131	0.7	−1.0
Total formal votes		19,554	96.8	+0.3
Informal votes		656	3.2	−0.3
Turnout		20,210	85.51	−3.7
Two-candidate-preferred result
Liberal	Bill Marmion	14,533	52.5	−7.6
Independent	Sue Walker	10,388	47.5	+47.5
Liberal hold		Swing	N/A	

=== Nollamara ===
2008 Western Australian state election: Nollamara
Party	Candidate	Votes	%	±%
Labor	Janine Freeman	9,427	51.2	−4.4
Liberal	Trent Charlton-Maughan	5,678	30.8	+7.0
Greens	Glen George	2,459	13.3	+7.9
Christian Democrats	Marty Firth	863	4.7	+1.6
Total formal votes		18,427	92.1	+0.9
Informal votes		1,587	7.9	−0.9
Turnout		20,014	84.9	
Two-party-preferred result
Labor	Janine Freeman	11,552	62.7	−6.5
Liberal	Trent Charlton-Maughan	6,860	37.3	+6.5
Labor hold		Swing	−6.5	

=== North West ===
2008 Western Australian state election: North West
Party	Candidate	Votes	%	±%
Labor	Vince Catania	4,161	36.2	−7.4
Liberal	Rod Sweetman	3,071	26.7	−10.4
National	Tom Day	2,609	22.7	+22.7
Greens	Peter Shaw	840	7.3	+2.4
Independent	Lex Fullarton	828	7.2	−3.0
Total formal votes		11,509	95.7	+0.4
Informal votes		520	4.3	−0.4
Turnout		12,029	75.4	
Two-party-preferred result
Labor	Vince Catania	6,103	53.1	+0.0
Liberal	Rod Sweetman	5,384	46.9	+0.0
Labor hold		Swing	+0.0	

=== Ocean Reef ===
2008 Western Australian state election: Ocean Reef
Party	Candidate	Votes	%	±%
Liberal	Albert Jacob	9,163	47.7	+5.8
Labor	Louise Durack	7,056	36.7	−7.9
Greens	Justin Wood	2,001	10.4	+3.7
Family First	Frederick Hay	543	2.8	−0.6
Christian Democrats	Kevin Mullen	438	2.3	+0.2
Total formal votes		19,201	95.0	−0.2
Informal votes		1,020	5.0	+0.2
Turnout		20,221	87.7	
Two-party-preferred result
Liberal	Albert Jacob	10,445	54.4	+6.0
Labor	Louise Durack	8,747	45.6	−6.0
Liberal gain from Labor		Swing	+6.0	

=== Perth ===
2008 Western Australian state election: Perth
Party	Candidate	Votes	%	±%
Labor	John Hyde	7,724	41.00	–7.01
Liberal	Chris Edwards	6,907	36.67	+2.82
Greens	Jonathan Hallett	3,631	19.28	+6.47
Christian Democrats	Guennadi Moukine	576	3.06	+0.49
Total formal votes		18,837	94.90	+0.01
Informal votes		1,013	5.10	–0.01
Turnout		19,850	81.42	–6.36
Two-party-preferred result
Labor	John Hyde	10,899	57.84	–2.96
Liberal	Chris Edwards	7,937	42.16	+2.96
Labor hold		Swing	–2.96	

=== Pilbara ===
2008 Western Australian state election: Pilbara
Party	Candidate	Votes	%	±%
Labor	Tom Stephens	3,336	44.4	−4.4
National	Alan Cochrane	1,724	22.9	+22.9
Liberal	Rosie Vrancic	1,321	17.6	−14.2
Greens	Kelly Howlett	724	9.6	+0.3
Family First	Joan Foley	412	5.5	+5.5
Total formal votes		7,517	94.8	−0.2
Informal votes		409	5.2	+0.2
Turnout		7,926	69.2	
Two-party-preferred result
Labor	Tom Stephens	4,024	53.6	−6.9
National	Alan Cochrane	3,490	46.4	+46.4
Labor hold		Swing	−6.9	

=== Riverton ===
2008 Western Australian state election: Riverton
Party	Candidate	Votes	%	±%
Liberal	Mike Nahan	8,002	41.3	+1.4
Labor	Tony McRae	7,722	39.9	−4.3
Greens	Sol Hanna	2,037	10.5	+4.6
Christian Democrats	Daniel Ossevoort	652	3.4	+0.4
Family First	Joy Drennan	548	2.8	+0.3
Independent	Christopher Boots	403	2.1	+2.1
Total formal votes		19,364	95.1	+0.3
Informal votes		1,004	4.9	−0.3
Turnout		20,368	89.6	
Two-party-preferred result
Liberal	Mike Nahan	9,708	50.2	+2.2
Labor	Tony McRae	9,644	49.8	−2.2
Liberal gain from Labor		Swing	+2.2	

=== Rockingham ===
2008 Western Australian state election: Rockingham
Party	Candidate	Votes	%	±%
Labor	Mark McGowan	9,559	51.2	−4.1
Liberal	David Simpson	6,371	34.1	+1.3
Greens	James Mumme	2,432	13.0	+8.3
Citizens Electoral Council	Rob Totten	318	1.7	+1.3
Total formal votes		18,680	94.5	−0.1
Informal votes		1,097	5.5	+0.1
Turnout		19,777	86.4	
Two-party-preferred result
Labor	Mark McGowan	11,321	60.6	−0.7
Liberal	David Simpson	7,355	39.4	+0.7
Labor hold		Swing	−0.7	

=== Scarborough ===
2008 Western Australian state election: Scarborough
Party	Candidate	Votes	%	±%
Liberal	Liza Harvey	8,374	44.9	+14.2
Labor	Scott Blackwell	5,622	30.1	−2.3
Greens	Sonja Lundie-Jenkins	2,338	12.5	+1.9
Independent	Elizabeth Re	1,707	9.1	+9.1
Christian Democrats	Jennifer Whately	400	2.1	−1.4
Family First	Jim McCourt	223	1.2	+1.2
Total formal votes		18,664	95.0	−0.6
Informal votes		972	5.0	+0.6
Turnout		19,636	83.8	
Two-party-preferred result
Liberal	Liza Harvey	10,290	55.2	+2.6
Labor	Scott Blackwell	8,360	44.8	−2.6
Liberal hold		Swing	+2.6	

=== South Perth ===
2008 Western Australian state election: South Perth
Party	Candidate	Votes	%	±%
Liberal	John McGrath	10,136	52.9	+7.5
Labor	Leena Michael	4,594	24.0	−8.5
Greens	Ros Harman	2,016	10.5	+2.1
Independent	Jim Grayden	1,767	9.2	−1.7
Family First	Karen McDonald	473	2.5	+2.5
Independent	Frank Hough	184	1.0	+1.0
Total formal votes		19,170	95.7	−0.9
Informal votes		858	4.3	+0.9
Turnout		20,028	85.1	
Two-party-preferred result
Liberal	John McGrath	12,310	64.3	+6.9
Labor	Leena Michael	6,845	35.7	−6.9
Liberal hold		Swing	+6.9	

=== Southern River ===
2008 Western Australian state election: Southern River
Party	Candidate	Votes	%	±%
Liberal	Peter Abetz	9,382	45.0	+7.4
Labor	Paul Andrews	8,119	39.0	−8.4
Greens	Nicola Wiseman	2,149	10.3	+5.5
Family First	Renise Judge	648	3.1	−0.7
Christian Democrats	Scott Kuipers	534	2.6	−0.4
Total formal votes		20,832	94.1	−0.7
Informal votes		1,299	5.9	+0.7
Turnout		22,131	89.8	
Two-party-preferred result
Liberal	Peter Abetz	10,759	51.6	+6.8
Labor	Paul Andrews	10,073	48.4	−6.8
Liberal gain from Labor		Swing	+6.8	

=== Swan Hills ===
2008 Western Australian state election: Swan Hills
Party	Candidate	Votes	%	±%
Liberal	Frank Alban	9,589	45.5	+6.3
Labor	Graham Giffard	7,183	34.1	−11.1
Greens	Jenni Bowman	3,009	14.3	+7.3
Family First	Craig Watson	734	3.5	+1.9
Christian Democrats	Keith Blok	540	2.6	+0.1
Total formal votes		21,055	94.8	−0.6
Informal votes		1,158	5.2	+0.6
Turnout		22,213	89.6	
Two-party-preferred result
Liberal	Frank Alban	11,268	53.5	+7.1
Labor	Graham Giffard	9,777	46.5	−7.1
Liberal gain from Labor		Swing	+7.1	

=== Vasse ===
2008 Western Australian state election: Vasse
Party	Candidate	Votes	%	±%
Liberal	Troy Buswell	11,306	55.5	+14.9
Labor	Marilyn Elson	4,427	21.8	−0.8
Greens	Mitchella Hutchins	3,653	17.9	+8.3
Christian Democrats	Gail Gifford	967	4.8	+3.6
Total formal votes		20,653	95.6	+0.1
Informal votes		947	4.4	−0.1
Turnout		21,300	87.8	
Two-party-preferred result
Liberal	Troy Buswell	12,913	63.5	+3.9
Labor	Marilyn Elson	7,423	36.5	−3.9
Liberal hold		Swing	+3.9	

=== Victoria Park ===
2008 Western Australian state election: Victoria Park
Party	Candidate	Votes	%	±%
Labor	Ben Wyatt	9,137	46.8	−2.3
Liberal	Ben Travia	6,723	34.4	+4.6
Greens	Kim Lisson	2,726	13.9	+4.6
Christian Democrats	Saskia Matthews	490	2.5	−0.4
Family First	James Olsen	468	2.4	+2.4
Total formal votes		19,544	95.2	+0.1
Informal votes		979	4.8	−0.1
Turnout		20,523	84.8	
Two-party-preferred result
Labor	Ben Wyatt	11,523	59.0	−4.7
Liberal	Ben Travia	8,012	41.0	+4.7
Labor hold		Swing	−4.7	

=== Wagin ===
2008 Western Australian state election: Wagin
Party	Candidate	Votes	%	±%
National	Terry Waldron	11,155	63.0	−1.0
Liberal	Steve Martin	3,254	18.4	+9.8
Labor	Douglas Melville	1,839	10.4	−4.2
Christian Democrats	Jacky Young	677	3.8	+0.4
Greens	Adrian Price	615	3.5	−0.1
Citizens Electoral Council	Jean Robinson	163	0.9	−0.7
Total formal votes		17,703	96.8	+1.1
Informal votes		593	3.2	−1.1
Turnout		18,296	89.8	
Two-candidate-preferred result
National	Terry Waldron	13,640	77.1	−2.6
Liberal	Steve Martin	4,045	22.9	+22.9
National hold		Swing	−2.6	

=== Wanneroo ===
2008 Western Australian state election: Wanneroo
Party	Candidate	Votes	%	±%
Liberal	Paul Miles	9,849	43.7	+7.7
Labor	Dianne Guise	8,990	39.9	−9.7
Greens	Heather Aquilina	1,974	8.8	+4.1
Family First	Rod Grasso	640	2.8	−1.2
Christian Democrats	Mary Birch	599	2.7	+0.4
Independent	Russell Sewell	496	2.2	+2.2
Total formal votes		22,548	94.9	+0.2
Informal votes		1,223	5.1	−0.2
Turnout		23,771	88.9	
Two-party-preferred result
Liberal	Paul Miles	11,429	50.7	+6.9
Labor	Dianne Guise	11,107	49.3	−6.9
Liberal gain from Labor		Swing	+6.9	

=== Warnbro ===
2008 Western Australian state election: Warnbro
Party	Candidate	Votes	%	±%
Labor	Paul Papalia	9,666	48.5	−4.4
Liberal	Shane Bathgate	6,412	32.1	+0.7
Greens	Colin Booth	2,414	12.1	+5.7
Family First	Matt Pollock	1,457	7.3	+4.3
Total formal votes		19,949	94.9	−0.1
Informal votes		1,066	5.1	+0.1
Turnout		21,015	86.3	
Two-party-preferred result
Labor	Paul Papalia	11,907	59.7	−1.5
Liberal	Shane Bathgate	8,039	40.3	+1.5
Labor hold		Swing	−1.5	

=== West Swan ===
2008 Western Australian state election: West Swan
Party	Candidate	Votes	%	±%
Labor	Rita Saffioti	8,612	46.2	−7.1
Liberal	Rod Henderson	7,017	37.6	+5.9
Greens	Michael Boswell	1,676	9.0	+3.9
Christian Democrats	Barbara Butler	872	4.7	+0.9
Independent	Chris Fayle	483	2.6	+2.6
Total formal votes		18,660	93.7	−0.7
Informal votes		1,246	6.3	+0.7
Turnout		19,906	89.0	
Two-party-preferred result
Labor	Rita Saffioti	10,156	54.4	−6.2
Liberal	Rod Henderson	8,497	45.6	+6.2
Labor hold		Swing	−6.2	

=== Willagee ===
2008 Western Australian state election: Willagee
Party	Candidate	Votes	%	±%
Labor	Alan Carpenter	9,718	51.7	+3.6
Liberal	Matt Taylor	5,820	30.9	+5.6
Greens	Robert Delves	3,277	17.4	+8.4
Total formal votes		18,815	93.3	+0.6
Informal votes		1,350	6.7	−0.6
Turnout		20,165	86.1	
Two-party-preferred result
Labor	Alan Carpenter	12,150	64.6	+0.9
Liberal	Matt Taylor	6,664	35.4	−0.9
Labor hold		Swing	+0.9	

== See also ==
- Results of the Western Australian state election, 2008 (Legislative Council)
- 2008 Western Australian state election
- Candidates of the Western Australian state election, 2008
- Members of the Western Australian Legislative Assembly, 2008–2013
