= Electoral results for the district of Cannington =

Western Australian district election results

This is a list of electoral results for the electoral district of Cannington in Western Australian state elections.

== Members for Cannington ==
Member	Party	Term
Bill Johnston	Labor	2008–2025
Ron Sao	Labor	2025–present

== Election results ==
=== Elections in the 2020s ===
2025 Western Australian state election: Cannington
Party	Candidate	Votes	%	±%
Labor	Ron Sao	13,178	54.2	−17.7
Liberal	Bruce Henderson	5,882	24.2	+11.3
Greens	Eric Hayward	3,730	15.4	+8.9
Christians	Mark Staer	1,507	6.2	+1.9
Total formal votes		24,297	94.3	−1.7
Informal votes		1,465	5.7	+1.7
Turnout		25,762	82.3	+2.4
Two-party-preferred result
Labor	Ron Sao	16,490	67.9	−12.8
Liberal	Bruce Henderson	7,798	32.1	+12.8
Labor hold		Swing	−12.8	

Results are not final. Last updated on 26 March 2025 at 1:30 PM AWST

2021 Western Australian state election: Cannington
Party	Candidate	Votes	%	±%
Labor	Bill Johnston	16,884	71.8	+17.3
Liberal	Bruce Henderson	3,059	13.0	−11.1
Greens	River Clarke	1,476	6.3	−2.8
Christians	Mark Staer	1,092	4.6	+0.9
One Nation	Gabrielle Iriks	385	1.6	−4.5
Liberal Democrats	Eric Ondra	304	1.3	+1.3
No Mandatory Vaccination	June Cahill	302	1.3	+1.3
Total formal votes		23,502	96.2	+1.1
Informal votes		927	3.8	−1.1
Turnout		24,429	83.9	+0.8
Two-party-preferred result
Labor	Bill Johnston	18,899	80.4	+12.9
Liberal	Bruce Henderson	4,596	19.6	−12.9
Labor hold		Swing	+12.9	

=== Elections in the 2010s ===
2017 Western Australian state election: Cannington
Party	Candidate	Votes	%	±%
Labor	Bill Johnston	11,474	55.0	+10.8
Liberal	Jesse Jacobs	4,970	23.8	−19.4
Greens	Elliot Thompson	1,850	8.9	−0.3
One Nation	Rozane Bezuidenhout	1,372	6.6	+6.6
Christians	Gary Smith	692	3.3	+3.3
Micro Business	Zena Rihani	303	1.5	+1.5
	Mohsin Virk	210	1.0	+1.0
Total formal votes		20,871	95.1	+2.3
Informal votes		1,086	4.9	−2.3
Turnout		21,957	85.3	−0.1
Two-party-preferred result
Labor	Bill Johnston	14,190	68.1	+16.0
Liberal	Jesse Jacobs	6,662	31.9	−16.0
Labor hold		Swing	+16.0	

2013 Western Australian state election: Cannington
Party	Candidate	Votes	%	±%
Labor	Bill Johnston	8,457	43.8	–1.7
Liberal	Jesse Jacobs	8,310	43.0	+10.2
Greens	Christine Cunningham	1,850	9.6	–6.7
Independent	Mark Harrington	702	3.6	+3.6
Total formal votes		19,319	92.6	−0.4
Informal votes		1,536	7.4	+0.4
Turnout		20,855	87.8	
Two-party-preferred result
Labor	Bill Johnston	10,054	52.1	–7.0
Liberal	Jesse Jacobs	9,259	47.9	+7.0
Labor hold		Swing	–7.0	

=== Elections in the 2000s ===
2008 Western Australian state election: Cannington
Party	Candidate	Votes	%	±%
Labor	Bill Johnston	8,475	45.44	−8.9
Liberal	Ryan Chorley	6,105	32.73	+3.3
Greens	Christine Cunningham	3,045	16.32	+9.3
Christian Democrats	Mark Staer	1,028	5.51	+1.6
Total formal votes		18,653	93.02	
Informal votes		1,399	6.98	
Turnout		20,052	86.44	
Two-party-preferred result^{[1]}
Labor	Bill Johnston	11,003	59.04	−4.3
Liberal	Ryan Chorley	7,633	40.96	+4.3
Labor hold		Swing	−4.3	
