= Electoral results for the district of Blackwood-Stirling =

Western Australian district election results

This is a list of electoral results for the electoral district of Blackwood-Stirling in Western Australian state elections.

== Members for Blackwood-Stirling ==
| Member | Party | Term |
|---|---|---|
| Terry Redman | National | 2008–2013 |

== Election results ==
=== Elections in the 2000s ===
2008 Western Australian state election: Blackwood-Stirling
| Party | Candidate | Votes | % | ±% |
|---|---|---|---|---|
| National | Terry Redman | 8,003 | 44.91 | +28.4 |
| Liberal | Wade de Campo | 4,518 | 25.35 | −15.6 |
| Labor | Raymond Phillips | 2,527 | 14.18 | −4.7 |
| Greens | Luke Petersen | 1,837 | 10.31 | +1.1 |
| Christian Democrats | Graham Lawn | 350 | 1.96 | +0.3 |
| Family First | Stephen Carson | 264 | 1.48 | −1.0 |
| Independent | Ken Gunson | 176 | 0.99 | +0.99 |
| Independent | Keith Smith | 145 | 0.81 | +0.81 |
| Total formal votes | | 17,820 | 96.14 | |
| Informal votes | | 715 | 3.86 | |
| Turnout | | 18,535 | 89.44 | |
Two-candidate-preferred result
| National | Terry Redman | 11,992 | 67.34 | N/A |
| Liberal | Wade de Campo | 5,816 | 32.66 | N/A |
| National hold | | Swing | N/A | |
