= St Norbert College, Queens Park =

Private school in Queens Park, Western Australia

Coordinates: 32°00′15″S 115°56′24″E

St. Norbert College

Location
- 135 Treasure Road Saint Norbert College (Perth) Queens Park,, Western Australia, 6107; Australia

Information
- Type: Private
- Motto: Latin: Ad Omnia Paratus ('prepared for all good works')
- Denomination: Catholic Church
- Established: 1965
- Principal: Sharon Rainford
- Staff: 111
- Gender: Co-educational
- Enrolment: ~921
- Campus: Queens Park
- Colors: Blue and gold
- Affiliation: Norbertine (Catholic Church)
- Website: www.norbert.wa.edu.au

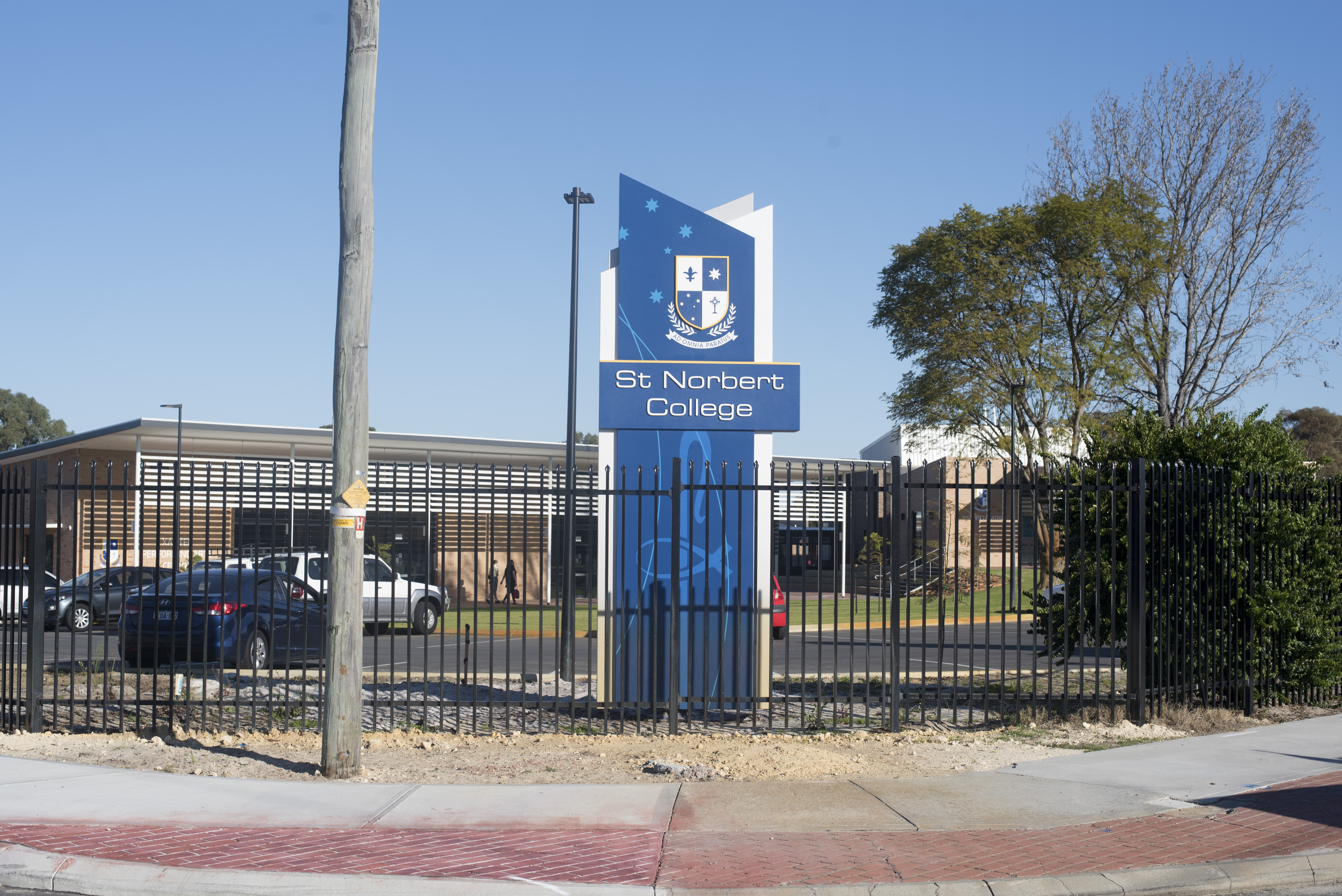
St Norbert College viewed from the corner of Treasure Road and Centre Street

St Norbert College (SNC) is a private Catholic secondary school in Queens Park, Perth, Western Australia. Founded in 1965 by Peter O'Reilly O Praem and John Reynolds O Praem, both Norbertine priests and educators, the school was named after Saint Norbert of Xanten. In 1976, the college became co-educational and currently enrols about 890 students.

== History ==
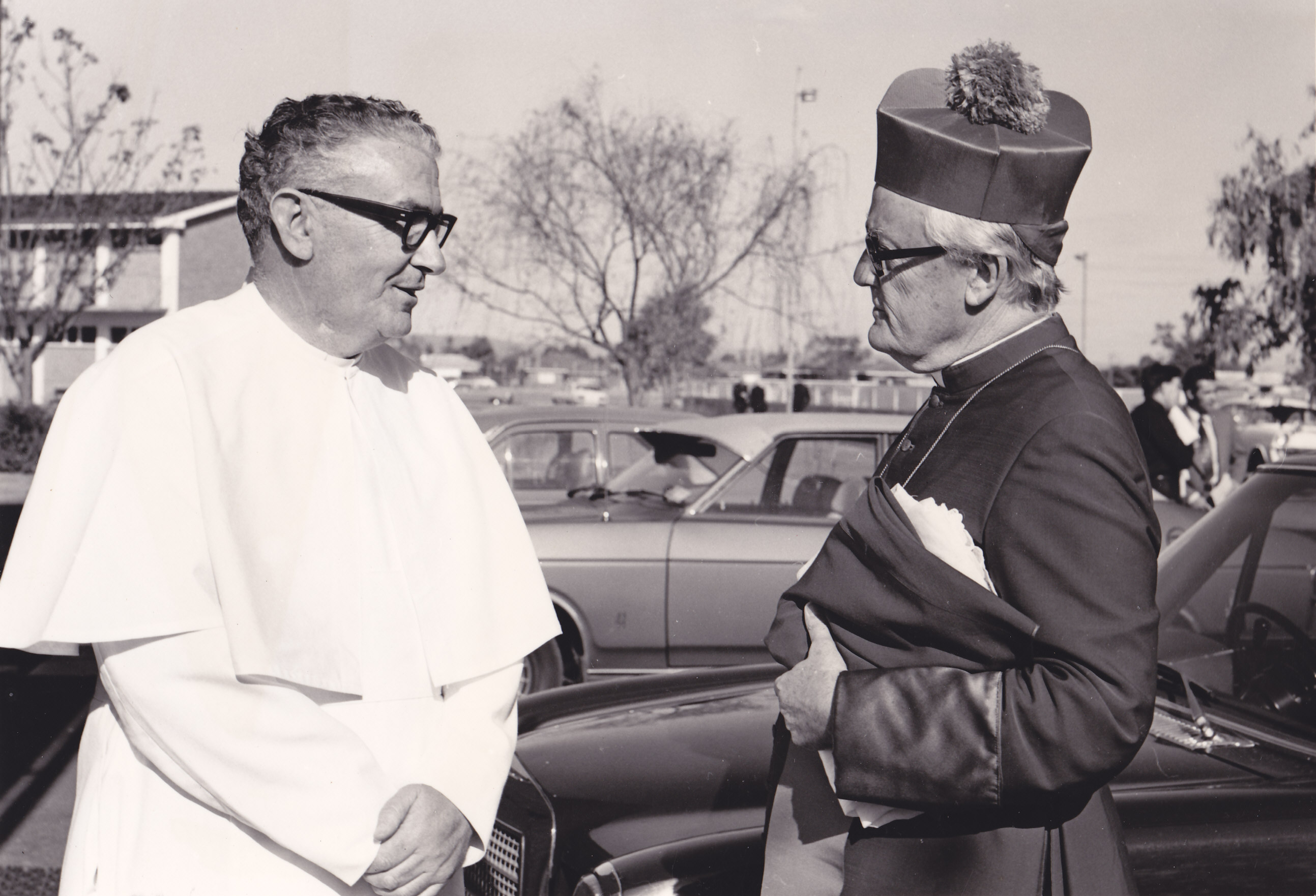
Peter O'Reilly O Praem with Archbishop Goody in the 1970s

In 1959, Peter O'Reilly O Praem, John Reynolds O Praem and Stephen Cooney O Praem travelled to Western Australia from Kilnacrott in Ireland. The original intention was to establish a boys' boarding school in York. This did not eventuate but the Norbertines have maintained a presence in the York parish.

In 1964, Archbishop Prendiville invited the Norbertine Canons to establish a boys' school in Queens Park. St Norbert College was officially blessed by F C Colwell O Praem, Abbot of Kilnacrott, on 7 February 1965.

In 1966, two Norbertines formed the staff, with Fr. Laurence Anderson O Praem as Headmaster.

The college expanded by one class each year until 1971 when the first students entered for the Leaving Certificate examinations. The school practiced single-sex education until 1976, when girls could enrol in Year 8.

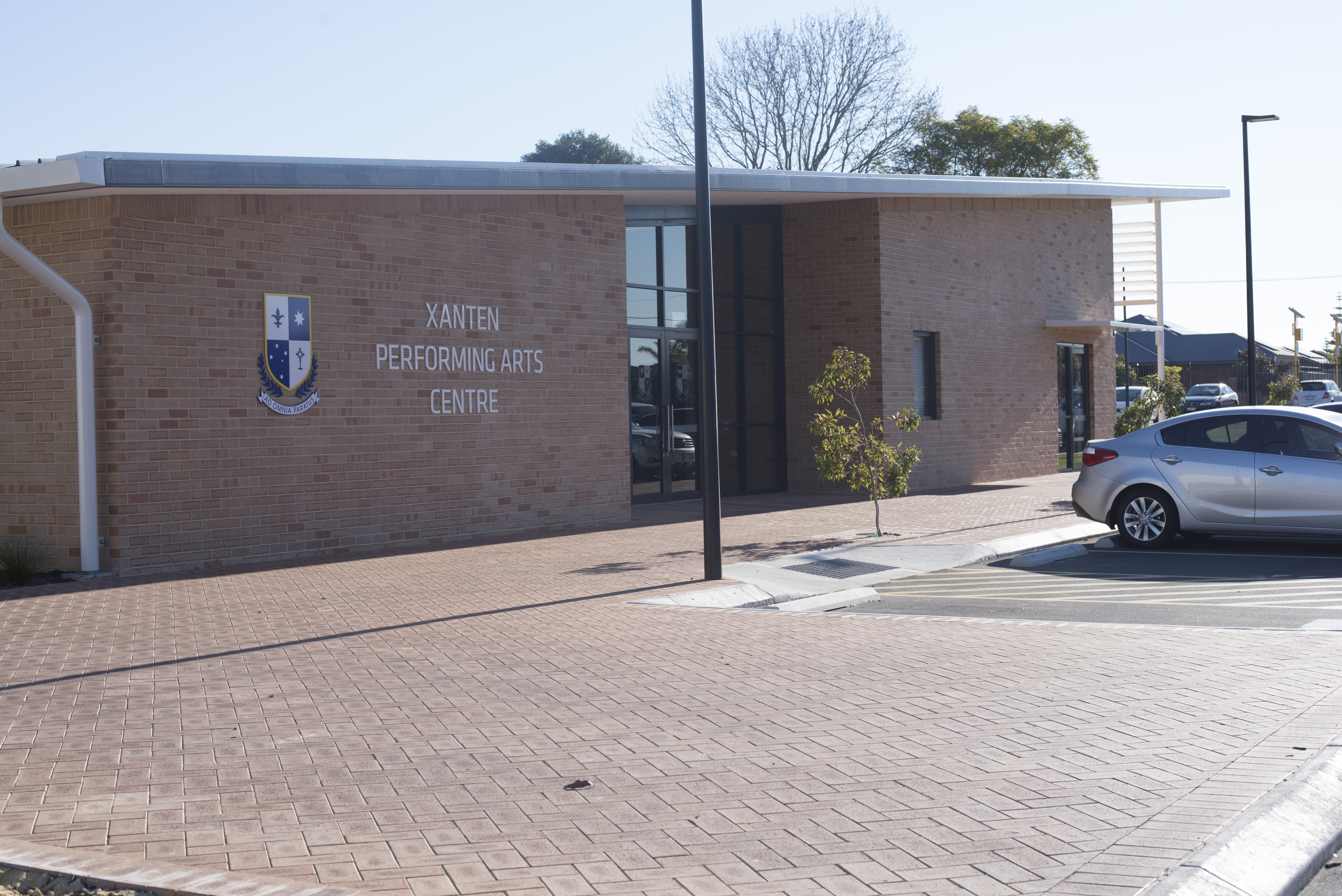
The new Xanten Performing Arts Centre, opened in 2017

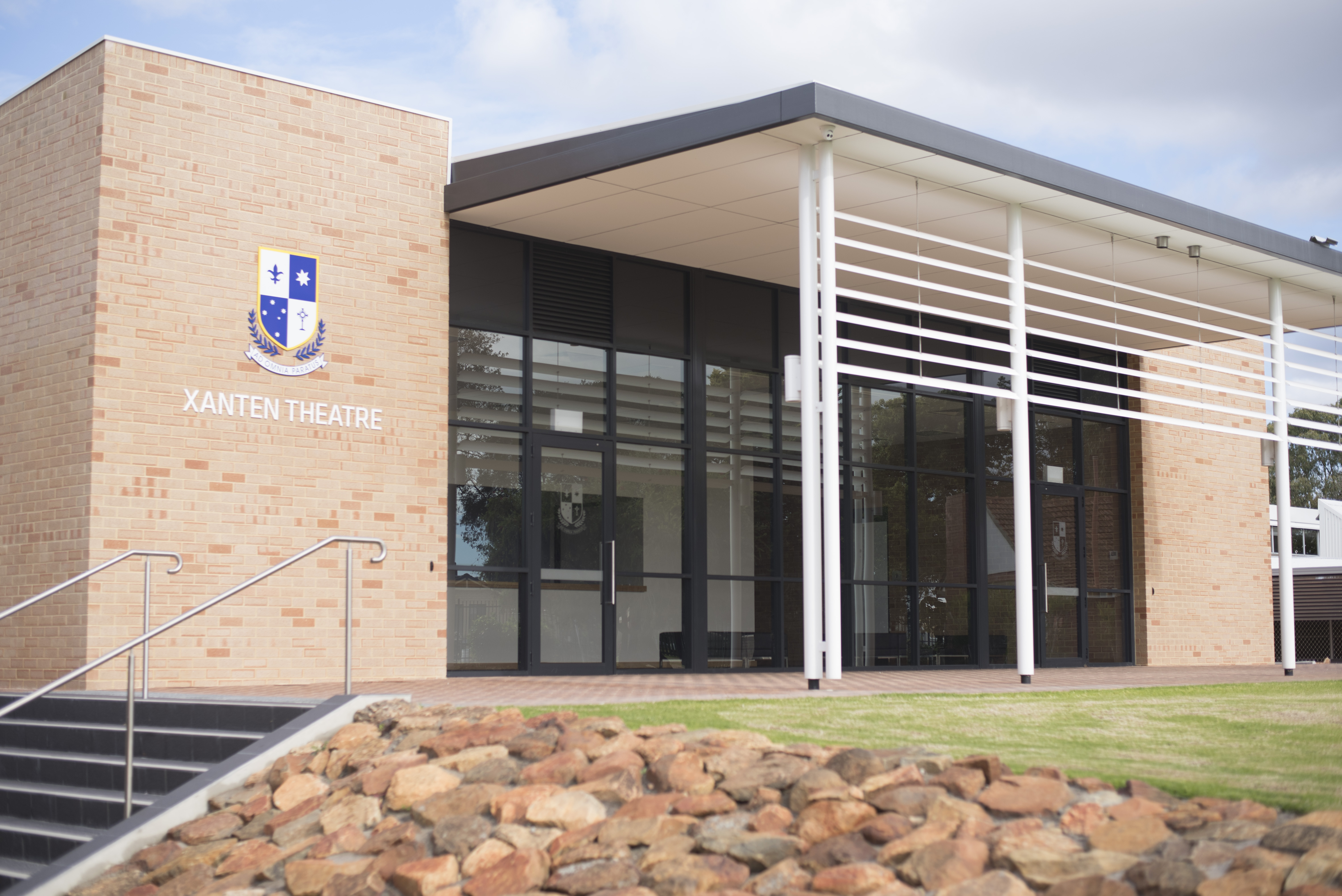
The Xanten Theatre

In 2010, the college began enrolling students in Year 7, in accordance with the Catholic Education Commission of Western Australia's expanded enrolment parameters. A new building, the Cappenburg Centre, was also blessed and opened in 2010. In 2016, the school celebrated being founded for 50 years.

== Principals ==
Position	Years	Name
Headmaster	1965–1971	Laurence Anderson O Praem
Headmaster	1971–1974	Joseph O'Donohoe O Praem
Headmaster	1975–1985	Des O'Sullivan
Principal	1985–1994	Tom Corcoran
Principal	1995–1996	Carole Hayes
Principal	1997–2007	Peter Hayes
Principal	2008–2011	Desirée Grzenda-Day
Principal	2012–2017	Annette Morey
Principal	2017–2022	Simon Harvey
Principal	2023–	Sharon Rainford

== Campus ==
The first expansion of facilities took place in four stages until 1976. Improvements in the science, and English department were made, and the school began courses in the Manual Arts and Home economics.

A building named the Connell Centre was built in 1978, and in 1980, the O'Sullivan-Devine Centre became operational.

In the early to mid 2000s, improvements to modernise the teaching facilities were held. The Administration area was also extended and refurbished to extend the Student Services area.

In 2009, with the introduction of Year 7 students planned for 2010, the Br Patrick Doolan Learning Centre was built, and established a canteen named Cafe 135@Treasure.

In 2010 the Cappenburg and the Floreffe Trade Training Centre were completed.

A Capital Development Plan was launched in 2015, and the following year a new Performing Arts Centre was built. The work included an extension of the Xanten Theatre, completing in 2017.

In 2022, construction began on a new building, replacing the current year 7 area with a two-storey building, adding three new classrooms a total capacity of approximately 135 extra students, as well as a staff room on the second floor with a walkway bridge connecting the building to the Fr O'Reilly centre, with construction finishing in 2023.

== Education ==
The School has a house system, where the names originate from significant places related to the Norbertine order, or the school itself.

In 2023, the School was among the top high performing students for Religion and Life ATAR and psychology ATAR.

House	Significance	Motto	Emblem
Xanten	Birthplace of St Norbert	–	Tiger
Prémontré	Where St Norbert established his first community of canons and canonesses	–	Penguin
Magdeburg	City in Germany where St Norbert was made Archbishop.	–	Magpie
Tongerlo	Town in Belgium with a Norbertine Abbey which is the 'grandmother' of the Queens Park community	'Veritas Vincit'	Kangaroo
Kilnacrott	Where Tongerlo Abbey established a community of canons in 1924.	'Glorificare et Sanctificare'	Crocodile

=== Sport ===
Teams representing St Norbert College compete in a range of interschool competitions throughout the year. The school participates in team sporting competitions as part of the Southern Associated Schools (SAS) competition. In 2018, teams representing St Norbert College competed in cricket, touch rugby, netball, soccer, Australian Rules football and basketball.

St. Norbert college participates in swimming competitions, such as the Associated and Catholic Colleges (ACC).

=== Philanthrophy ===
Each year, the school hosts 'immersion' programs to areas such as the Kimberley region of Western Australia, or to other countries such as Cambodia.

== Notable alumni ==
- Peter Bol, Olympic middle-distance runner.
- Pete Curulli, MIX 94.5FM radio host.
- Robyn van Nus, Olympic shooter.
- Gabriella Rogers, reporter for Nine News.
- Scott Walker, Olympic bobsleigh team member.
- Ron Sao, MLA for Cannington
