= Results of the 2008 Western Australian state election (Legislative Council) =

2008 Western Australian state election (Legislative Council)
- 6 September 2008

All 36 seats in the Legislative Council 18 seats needed for a majority

	First party	Second party
Leader	Norman Moore	Kim Chance
Party	Liberal	Labor
Leader's seat	Mining and Pastoral	Agricultural
Seats before	15	16
Seats won	16	11
Seat change	▲1	▼5
Popular vote	443,064	404,389
Percentage	39.60%	36.14%
Swing	▲2.48pp	▼7.21pp
	Third party	Fourth party
Leader	None	None
Party	National	Greens
Seats before	1	2
Seats won	5	4
Seat change	▲4	▲2
Popular vote	59,505	123,942
Percentage	5.32%	11.08%
Swing	▲3.13pp	▲3.56pp

This is a list of electoral region results for the Western Australian Legislative Council in the 2008 Western Australian state election.

== Results by electoral region ==
=== Agricultural ===
2008 Western Australian state election: Agricultural
Party	Candidate	Votes	%	±%
Quota		10,432		
National	1. Max Trenorden (elected 1); 2. Philip Gardiner (elected 4); 3. Mia Davies (elected 6); 4. Martin Aldridge; 5. Cathy Wood	24,420	33.44	+14.1
Liberal	1. Brian Ellis (elected 2); 2. Jim Chown (elected 5); 3. Chris Wilkins; 4. Jane Mouritz; 5. Jamie Falls	23,830	32.63	−5.9
Labor	1. Matt Benson-Lidholm (elected 3); 2. Darren West; 3. Vickie Petersen; 4. Alan McCallum	15,772	21.60	−6.0
Greens	1. Dee Margetts; 2. Paul Connolly	3,721	5.10	+0.9
Family First	1. Anthony Fels; 2. Felly Chandra	2,080	2.85	+1.4
Christian Democrats	1. Mac Forsyth; 2. Lachlan Dunjey	1,692	2.32	+0.3
One Nation	Ross Paravicini	624	0.85	−2.2
Independent	1. Shelly Posey; 2. Valerie Tan	493	0.68	+0.7
Citizens Electoral Council	1. Stuart Smith; 2. Chris Pepper	215	0.29	0.0
New Country	Chris Dodoff	175	0.24	−2.1
Total formal votes		73,022	97.66	+0.5
Informal votes		1,746	2.34	−0.5
Turnout		74,768	88.43	−2.9

=== East Metropolitan ===
2008 Western Australian state election: East Metropolitan
Party	Candidate	Votes	%	±%
Quota		39,514		
Labor	1. Jock Ferguson (elected 1); 2. Ljiljanna Ravlich (elected 3); 3. Linda Savage; 4. Gary Carson; 5. Carolyn Burton; 6. Craig Comrie	113,686	41.10	−9.3
Liberal	1. Helen Morton (elected 2); 2. Donna Faragher (elected 4); 3. Alyssa Hayden (elected 5); 4. Steve Blizard; 5. Darryl Trease; 6. Guy Simpson	104,385	37.74	+5.5
Greens	1. Alison Xamon (elected 6); 2. Steve Wolff; 3. Damian Douglas-Meyer	32,228	11.65	+4.6
Family First	1. Stephen Bolt; 2. Symia Hopkinson	8,839	3.20	+1.0
Christian Democrats	1. Dwight Randall; 2. Gerard Goiran	8,094	2.93	0.0
National	1. Sean Wood; 2. Kevin Mangini	2,690	0.97	+1.0
One Nation	James Hopkinson	2,051	0.74	−1.1
Independent	Tom Hoyer	1,724	0.62	+0.6
Daylight Savings	Conor Day	1,665	0.60	+0.60
Independent	Richard Nash	514	0.19	+0.2
Citizens Electoral Council	1. Neil Vincent; 2. Theresa Passmore	417	0.15	0.0
Independent	John Tucak	298	0.11	−0.6
Total formal votes		276,591	96.74	+0.2
Informal votes		9,319	3.26	−0.2
Turnout		285,910	87.29	−4.0

=== Mining and Pastoral ===
2008 Western Australian state election: Mining and Pastoral
Party	Candidate	Votes	%	±%
Quota		7,773		
Labor	1. Jon Ford (elected 1); 2. Helen Bullock (elected 4); 3. Jim Murie; 4. Jodie Lynch; 5. Mike Anderton; 6. Terry Healy	18,554	34.10	−6.4
Liberal	1. Norman Moore (elected 2); 2. Ken Baston (elected 5); 3. Mark Lewis; 4. Isabella Scott; 5. Ross Wood; 6. Alan Dungey	16,227	29.82	−7.5
National	1. Wendy Duncan (elected 3); 2. Dave Grills; 3. Alan Keeling; 4. Garry McGlinn	11,656	21.42	+18.6
Greens	1. Robin Chapple (elected 6); 2. Kate Davis	4,869	8.95	+1.7
Christian Democrats	1. Roger Mansell; 2. Peter Watt	1,018	1.87	+0.3
Family First	David Kidd	896	1.65	+1.4
One Nation	Gavin Ness	528	0.97	−1.1
Daylight Savings	Pat Cunneen	392	0.72	+0.72
New Country	David Larsen	160	0.29	+0.3
Citizens Electoral Council	1. Lorraine Thomas; 2. Orm Girvan	109	0.20	0.0
Total formal votes		54,409	97.04	0.0
Informal votes		1,661	2.96	0.0
Turnout		56,070	73.77	−1.9

=== North Metropolitan ===
2008 Western Australian state election: North Metropolitan
Party	Candidate	Votes	%	±%
Quota		40,034		
Liberal	1. Peter Collier (elected 1); 2. Michael Mischin (elected 3); 3. Liz Behjat (elected 5); 4. Colin Edwardes; 5. Judith Dowson	129,709	46.29	+4.2
Labor	1. Ken Travers (elected 2); 2. Ed Dermer (elected 4); 3. Tim Daly; 4. Kelly Shay; 5. Iqbal Samnakay; 6. Bill Leadbetter	91,512	32.66	−7.8
Greens	1. Giz Watson (elected 6); 2. Cameron Poustie; 3. Brenda Roy	36,413	12.99	+4.1
Christian Democrats	1. Ruth Nicholls; 2. David Kingston	6,302	2.25	−0.1
Family First	1. Trona Young; 2. Doug Croker	4,329	1.54	−0.3
Independent	1. Brian Peachey; 2. Joseph Nardizzi	3,936	1.40	+1.4
National	1. Joanne Burges; 2. Cheryl Fahey	2,181	0.78	+0.8
Daylight Savings	Ben MacKinnon	2,062	0.74	+0.74
Independent	1. John Eyden; 2. Paul Young	1,112	0.40	+0.4
One Nation	George Gault	1,098	0.39	−0.5
Independent	Julie Gray	576	0.21	+0.2
Citizens Electoral Council	1. Ron McLean; 2. Paul Augustson	432	0.15	+0.2
Independent	Eugene Hands	203	0.07	+0.1
	Douglas Greypower	172	0.06	+0.1
Independent	Wally Morris	143	0.05	+0.1
	Christopher King	55	0.02	+0.0
Total formal votes		280,235	97.42	+0.3
Informal votes		7,428	2.58	−0.3
Turnout		287,663	86.61	−3.9

=== South Metropolitan ===
2008 Western Australian state election: South Metropolitan
Party	Candidate	Votes	%	±%
Quota		40,084		
Labor	1. Sue Ellery (elected 1); 2. Kate Doust (elected 3); 3. Fiona Henderson; 4. Batong Pham; 5. Jack de Groot; 6. Andrew Vitolins	113,957	40.61	−6.6
Liberal	1. Simon O'Brien (elected 2); 2. Nick Goiran (elected 4); 3. Phil Edman (elected 5); 4. Donna Gordin; 5. John Jamieson; 6. Michelle Verkerk	108,229	38.57	+3.0
Greens	1. Lynn MacLaren (elected 6); 2. Scott Ryan	33,426	11.91	+4.5
Family First	1. Frank Lindsey; 2. Bev Custers	5,981	2.13	+0.1
Christian Democrats	1. Brent Tremain; 2. Linda Brewer	5,605	2.00	−0.2
Independent	1. Christopher Oughton; 2. Huw Grossmith	2,679	0.95	+1.0
Daylight Savings	Jeffrey Gidman	2,061	0.73	+0.73
National	1. Hilary Wheater; 2. Peter Wahlsten	1,966	0.70	+0.7
Independent	Steve Walker	1,782	0.64	+0.6
One Nation	Neil Gilmour	1,716	0.61	−0.6
Citizens Electoral Council	1. Paul Ellison; 2. Barry Bushen	1,597	0.57	+0.6
Independent	1. Eric Miller; 2. Yolanda Nardizzi	1,584	0.56	+0.6
Total formal votes		280,583	97.11	+0.5
Informal votes		8,339	2.89	−0.5
Turnout		288,922	87.20	−3.3

=== South West ===
2008 Western Australian state election: South West
Party	Candidate	Votes	%	±%
Quota		17,908		
Liberal	1. Robyn McSweeney (elected 1); 2. Nigel Hallett (elected 3); 3. Barry House (elected 6); 4. Paul Fitzpatrick; 5. Dennis Wellington; 6. Ross Ryan	60,684	39.41	+0.3
Labor	1. Sally Talbot (elected 2); 2. Adele Farina (elected 4); 3. John Mondy; 4. Wendy Perdon; 5. Christopher Hossen; 6. Elizabeth Nedela	50,908	33.06	−4.4
National	1. Colin Holt (elected 5); 2. Patricia Hughes	16,592	10.77	+5.2
Greens	1. Paul Llewellyn; 2. Rae McPherson	13,285	8.63	+1.0
Family First	1. Dan Sullivan; 2. Linda Rose	6,024	3.91	+0.9
Christian Democrats	1. John Lewis; 2. Ray Moran	3,251	2.11	+0.4
One Nation	Brian Burns	995	0.65	−1.5
Independent	1. Elaine Green; 2. Terry O'Leary	881	0.57	+0.6
Daylight Savings	Kara Pascoe	626	0.41	+0.41
Independent	Filip Guglielmana	328	0.21	+0.2
New Country	Judy Pearce	220	0.14	−0.5
Citizens Electoral Council	1. Ian Tuffnell; 2. Allan Dilley	205	0.13	+0.1
Total formal votes		153,999	97.38	+0.7
Informal votes		4,150	2.62	−0.7
Turnout		158,149	88.45	−2.7

== See also ==
- Results of the Western Australian state election, 2008 (Legislative Assembly A-L)
- Results of the Western Australian state election, 2008 (Legislative Assembly M-Z)
- 2008 Western Australian state election
- Candidates of the Western Australian state election, 2008
- Members of the Western Australian Legislative Council, 2009–2013
