= Zempilas shadow ministry =

The Zempilas shadow ministry includes members of the current shadow ministry of Basil Zempilas as leader of the opposition in Western Australia.

== Current arrangement ==
Shadow Minister	Portfolio	Image
Basil Zempilas MLA	Leader of the Opposition; Shadow Minister for: State Development; Citizenship and Multicultural Interests; Leader of the WA Liberal Party	
Libby Mettam MLA	Deputy Leader of the Opposition; Shadow Minister for: Health; Mental Health; Prevention of Family & Domestic Violence; Defence Industries and AUKUS; Deputy Leader of the WA Liberal Party	
Shane Love MLA	Shadow Minister for: Regional Development; Mines and Petroleum; Electoral Affairs; Leader of the National Party	
Peter Rundle MLA	Shadow Minister for: Water; Sport and Recreation; Deputy Leader of the National Party	
Sandra Brewer MLA	Shadow Treasurer; Shadow Minister for Women's Interests	
David Bolt MLA	Shadow Minister for: Housing and Homelessness; Environment and Climate; Science and Innovation; Deputy Leader of the National Party	
Bevan Eatts MLA	Shadow Minister for: Forestry; Aged Care	
Hon. Nick Goiran MLC	Shadow Attorney General; Shadow Minister for Child Protection	
Adam Hort MLA	Shadow Minister for: Police; Corrective Services; Youth	
Lachlan Hunter MLA	Shadow Minister for: Agriculture and Food; Racing and Gaming	
Jonathan Huston MLA	Shadow Minister for: Deregulation; Small Business; Public Sector Reform; Veterans	
Scott Leary MLA	Shadow Minister for: Commerce; Tourism	
Hon. Steven Martin MLC	Shadow Minister for: Transport; Ports; Communities	
Hon. Tjorn Sibma MLC	Shadow Minister for: Finance; Training and Workforce Development; Major Infrastructure	
Liam Staltari MLA	Shadow Minister for: Education; Early Childhood; Disability Services; Heritage	
Hon. Steve Thomas MLC	Shadow Minister for: Energy; Industrial Relations	
Hon. Neil Thomson MLC	Shadow Minister for: Planning and Lands; Aboriginal Affairs; Seniors	
Kirrilee Warr MLA	Shadow Minister for: Local Government; Fisheries	

== See also ==
- Opposition (Western Australia)
- Leader of the Opposition (Western Australia)
