= Bevan Eatts =

Australian politician

Bevan Eatts MLA

Member of the Western Australian Legislative Assembly for Warren-Blackwood
- Incumbent
- Assumed office 8 March 2025
- Preceded by: Jane Kelsbie

Personal details
- Born: Western Australia
- Party: National
- Website: www.bevaneatts.com.au

Bevan Eatts is an Australian politician of the National Party who is the member of the Western Australian Legislative Assembly for the electoral district of Warren-Blackwood. He won his seat at the 2025 Western Australian state election. He succeeded Jane Kelsbie of the Labor Party, whom he defeated.

Eatts serves as Shadow Minister for Forestry and Aged Care in the Zempilas shadow ministry.

Western Australian Legislative Assembly
Preceded by Jane Kelsbie	Member for Warren-Blackwood; 2025–present	Incumbent
