= Jane Kelsbie =

Western Australian politician (born 1966)

Member of the Western Australian Legislative Assembly for Warren-Blackwood
- In office 13 March 2021 – 8 March 2025
- Preceded by: Terry Redman
- Succeeded by: Bevan Eatts

Personal details
- Born: 4 October 1966 (age 59) Subiaco, Western Australia
- Party: Labor

Elizabeth Jane Kelsbie (born 4 October 1966) is an Australian politician. She has been an Australian Labor Party member of the Western Australian Legislative Assembly for the electoral district of Warren-Blackwood from 2021 to 2025.

Prior to entering politics, Kelsbie was the chief executive of employment organisation Worklink WA, the first female president of the Denmark Surf Livesaving Club between 2016 and 2019 and a board member of the Denmark Chamber of Commerce.

She won her seat at the 2021 Western Australian state election with a 14.3% swing against the incumbent National Party candidate. Kelsbie defeated the former leader of the WA Nationals, Terry Redman.

In September 2021, Kelsbie declared her support in parliament for the McGowan Government's decision to bring an end to the native timber forestry industry.

In the 2025 Western Australian state election, she was unseated by Nationals candidate Bevan Eatts.

Western Australian Legislative Assembly
Preceded by Terry Redman	Member for Warren-Blackwood; 2021–2025	Succeeded by Bevan Eatts
