= Ron Sao =

Western Australian politician

Ron Sao MLA

Member of the Western Australian Legislative Assembly for Cannington
- Incumbent
- Assumed office 8 March 2025
- Preceded by: Bill Johnston

Personal details
- Party: Labor
- Website: ronsao.com.au

Ronald Sao is an Australian politician from the Labor Party who is member of the Western Australian Legislative Assembly for the electoral district of Cannington. He won his seat at the 2025 Western Australian state election.

Sao was raised in Beckenham and educated at St Norbert College. Sao served as chief of staff for his predecessor Bill Johnston from March 2021 to December 2025.

In 2021, he survived an emergency incident at Smiths Beach.

== See also ==
- List of Asian Australian politicians

Western Australian Legislative Assembly
Preceded by Bill Johnston	Member for Cannington; 2025–present	Incumbent
