= Electoral district of Warren-Blackwood =

State electoral district of Western Australia

Warren-Blackwood Western Australia—Legislative Assembly
- Interactive map of electoral district boundaries from the 2025 state election
- State: Western Australia
- Dates current: 1950–2008^{1}, 2013–present
- MP: Bevan Eatts
- Party: National
- Namesake: Warren region; Blackwood River
- Electors: 31,351 (2025)
- Area: 18,230 km^{2} (7,038.6 sq mi)
- Demographic: Rural
- Coordinates: 34.21°S 116.31°E
Electorates around Warren-Blackwood:
Collie-Preston; Vasse	Roe	Roe
Indian Ocean	Warren-Blackwood	Warren-Blackwood
Great Australian Bight	Great Australian Bight	Great Australian Bight

Footnotes
- ^{1} known as Warren 1950–1996 and Blackwood-Stirling 2008-2013

Warren-Blackwood is an electoral district of the Legislative Assembly in the Australian state of Western Australia from 1950 to 2008, and from 2013 onwards.

Known as Warren until 1996, the district was located in the south-west of the state and first contested at the 1950 state election. The seat was abolished ahead of the 2008 state election as a result of the reduction in rural seats made necessary by the one vote one value reforms. Its former territory was largely absorbed by the seat of Blackwood-Stirling, with parts also added to Vasse. The following state election saw the changes essentially reversed, with the name Blackwood-Stirling reverting to Warren-Blackwood.

== Members for Warren-Blackwood ==
Warren (1950–1996)
Member	Party	Term
Ernest Hoar	Labor	1950–1957
Joseph Rowberry	Labor	1958–1968
David Evans	Labor	1968–1989
Paul Omodei	Liberal	1989–1996
Warren-Blackwood (1996–2008)
Member	Party	Term
Paul Omodei	Liberal	1996–2008
Paul Omodei	Independent	2008
Warren-Blackwood (2013–present)
Member	Party	Term
Terry Redman	National	2013–2021
Jane Kelsbie	Labor	2021–2025
Bevan Eatts	National	2025–present

== Election results ==
2025 Western Australian state election: Warren-Blackwood
Party	Candidate	Votes	%	±%
Labor	Jane Kelsbie	7,184	27.2	−5.0
National	Bevan Eatts	5,757	21.8	−7.2
Liberal	Wade De Campo	5,721	21.6	+8.9
Greens	Julie Marsh	4,407	16.7	+1.9
Legalise Cannabis	Aaron Peet	1,276	4.8	+2.4
One Nation	Stephen James O'Connor	1,144	4.3	+2.8
Christians	Martin Hartigan	525	2.0	+2.0
Shooters, Fishers, Farmers	Paul John Da Silva	428	1.6	−2.3
Total formal votes		26,442	95.9	−0.4
Informal votes		1,141	4.1	+0.4
Turnout		27,583	88.0	+6.5
Two-candidate-preferred result
National	Bevan Eatts	13,683	51.8	+4.0
Labor	Jane Kelsbie	12,733	48.2	−4.0
National gain from Labor		Swing	+4.0	
