= Electoral district of Blackwood-Stirling =

Former state electoral district of Western Australia

Blackwood-Stirling Western Australia—Legislative Assembly
- State: Western Australia
- Dates current: 2008–2013
- MP: Terry Redman
- Party: National
- Namesake: Blackwood River; Stirling Range
- Area: 24,934 km^{2} (9,627.1 sq mi)

Blackwood-Stirling was an electoral district of the Legislative Assembly in the Australian state of Western Australia. It took parts of the South West and Great Southern regions of Western Australia.

Politically, Blackwood-Stirling was a conservative seat. It was theoretically competitive between the two conservative forces in Western Australian politics, namely the Liberal Party and the National Party.

== History ==
Blackwood-Stirling was first created for the 2008 state election. It was essentially an amalgamation of the Liberal-held district of Warren-Blackwood and the National-held district of Stirling, although parts of each ended up in neighbouring districts. Of the new district's voters, 52% came from the former district, while 37% came from the latter. The remaining 11% was previously a part of the National-held district of Wagin. The former member for Stirling, National MP Terry Redman, won the seat at the election.

Prior to the 2013 state election, an electoral redistribution shifted the district to the west, moving many of the former Stirling voters into the district of Wagin and adding voters from the district of Collie-Preston. The realigned district was now essentially an expanded version of the old Warren-Blackwood district and the former name was resumed.

== Geography ==
Blackwood-Stirling incorporated the following government councils: Shire of Boyup Brook, Shire of Bridgetown-Greenbushes, Shire of Cranbrook, Shire of Denmark, Shire of Manjimup, Shire of Nannup, Shire of Plantagenet, and a southern portion of the Shire of Augusta-Margaret River.

== Members for Blackwood-Stirling ==
Member	Party	Term
Terry Redman	National	2008–2013

== Election results ==
2008 Western Australian state election: Blackwood-Stirling
Party	Candidate	Votes	%	±%
National	Terry Redman	8,003	44.91	+28.4
Liberal	Wade de Campo	4,518	25.35	−15.6
Labor	Raymond Phillips	2,527	14.18	−4.7
Greens	Luke Petersen	1,837	10.31	+1.1
Christian Democrats	Graham Lawn	350	1.96	+0.3
Family First	Stephen Carson	264	1.48	−1.0
Independent	Ken Gunson	176	0.99	+0.99
Independent	Keith Smith	145	0.81	+0.81
Total formal votes		17,820	96.14	
Informal votes		715	3.86	
Turnout		18,535	89.44	
Two-candidate-preferred result
National	Terry Redman	11,992	67.34	N/A
Liberal	Wade de Campo	5,816	32.66	N/A
National hold		Swing	N/A	
