= Bill Johnston (politician) =

Australian politician

The Honourable Bill Johnston MLA

Member of the Western Australian Legislative Assembly for Cannington
- In office 6 September 2008 – 2025
- Preceded by: constituency established
- Succeeded by: Ron Sao

Personal details
- Born: William Joseph Johnston; 11 August 1962 (age 64) Canberra, ACT, Australia
- Party: Labor Party
- Spouse: Kate Doust
- Website: www.billjohnston.com.au

William Joseph Johnston (born 11 August 1962) is an Australian politician. He was a Labor Party member of the Western Australian Legislative Assembly from the 2008 state election until the 2025 state election, representing Cannington.

While still a student Johnston spent time abroad as an American Field Service exchange student to Bandung, Indonesia. He is married to Kate Doust, the member for the South Metropolitan Region.

Prior to entering Parliament, Johnston spent seven years as the state secretary of WA Labor and was a former senior official of the Shop, Distributive and Allied Employees Association, the union representing retail and warehouse workers.

In the 2013 state election, Johnston was re-elected for a second term in office. In opposition, he was the shadow minister for State Development; Energy; Mines & Petroleum. He was reelected again at the 2017 Western Australian state election.

== McGowan Ministry ==
When Labor was elected to government in 2017, Johnston became Minister for Asian Engagement; Minister for Housing; Minister for Electoral Affairs; and Minister for Commerce and Industrial Relations. Five days after the cabinet was sworn in, he swapped the Housing portfolio with Peter Tinley, after Tinley resigned as Minister for Mines and Petroleum over a possible conflict of interest.

On 13 December 2018 Johnston gained the Energy portfolio and relinquished Electoral Affairs, Commerce and Asian Engagement.

As Minister for Industrial Relations, Johnston introduced industrial manslaughter laws. These laws include a maximum penalty of between five and 20 years imprisonment for individuals, along with fines of up to $10 million for companies responsible for the death of a worker.

In October 2020, Johnston and Premier Mark McGowan announced the Household Electricity Credit, a $600 credit applied to every household electricity account. The credit was funded by a settlement of the decades long Bell Group litigation.

As Energy Minister, Johnston launched Western Australia's first Whole of System Plan, a long-term plan for the South West Interconnected System electricity network. He has also overseen reforms to solar buyback arrangements, intended to support the stability of the electricity network as household solar generation increases.

In November 2023, Johnston announced he was resigning from the Ministry effective 8 December 2023, and would not contest the next election. He was succeeded as MLA by his former chief of staff Ron Sao.

Western Australian Legislative Assembly
New seat	Member for Cannington; 2008–2025	Incumbent
