= Electoral district of Cannington =

State electoral district in Perth, Western Australia

Cannington Western Australia—Legislative Assembly
- Interactive map of electoral district boundaries from the 2025 state election
- State: Western Australia
- Dates current: 2008–present
- MP: Ron Sao
- Party: Labor
- Namesake: Cannington
- Electors: 31,312 (2025)
- Area: 40 km^{2} (15.4 sq mi)
- Demographic: Metropolitan
- Coordinates: 32.03°S 115.94°E
Electorates around Cannington:
Victoria Park	Belmont	Forrestfield
Riverton	Cannington	Thornlie
Jandakot	Southern River	Thornlie

Cannington is an electoral district of the Legislative Assembly in the Australian state of Western Australia.

The district is based in the inner southern suburbs of Perth.

Cannington is a safe Labor seat. Based on the results of the 2005 state election, the district was created with a Labor Party majority of 63.3% to 36.7% versus the Liberal Party.

== Geography ==
Based in the southern suburbs of Perth, the district straddles both sides of the Canning River. It includes most of Cannington, as well as East Cannington, Beckenham, Queens Park, Wilson, Lynwood, Langford, most of Ferndale and part of Thornlie.

== History ==
Cannington was first contested at the 2008 state election. It was a new seat created as a result of the one vote one value reforms. Its territory north of the Canning River was constructed from parts of Victoria Park and Kenwick, whilst territory south of the Canning River came from Riverton and Southern River.

== Members for Cannington ==
Member	Party	Term
Bill Johnston	Labor	2008–2025
Ron Sao	Labor	2025–present

== Election results ==
2025 Western Australian state election: Cannington
Party	Candidate	Votes	%	±%
Labor	Ron Sao	13,178	54.2	−17.7
Liberal	Bruce Henderson	5,882	24.2	+11.3
Greens	Eric Hayward	3,730	15.4	+8.9
Christians	Mark Staer	1,507	6.2	+1.9
Total formal votes		24,297	94.3	−1.7
Informal votes		1,465	5.7	+1.7
Turnout		25,762	82.3	+2.4
Two-party-preferred result
Labor	Ron Sao	16,490	67.9	−12.8
Liberal	Bruce Henderson	7,798	32.1	+12.8
Labor hold		Swing	−12.8	
