= Terry Redman =

Australian politician (born 1963)

The Honourable Terry Redman

14th Leader of the National Party in Western Australia
- In office 19 November 2013 – 9 August 2016
- Deputy: Mia Davies
- Preceded by: Brendon Grylls
- Succeeded by: Brendon Grylls

Member of the Western Australian Parliament for Warren-Blackwood
- In office 9 March 2013 – 13 March 2021
- Preceded by: New creation
- Succeeded by: Jane Kelsbie

Member of the Western Australian Parliament for Blackwood-Stirling
- In office 6 September 2008 – 9 March 2013
- Preceded by: New creation
- Succeeded by: Seat abolished

Member of the Western Australian Parliament for Stirling
- In office 26 February 2005 – 6 September 2008
- Preceded by: Monty House
- Succeeded by: Seat abolished

Personal details
- Born: Donald Terence Redman; 16 April 1963 (age 63) Subiaco, Western Australia
- Citizenship: Australian
- Party: The Nationals
- Spouse: Marie Redman
- Occupation: Teacher

Donald Terence Redman (born 16 April 1963) is an Australian politician. He was a National Party member of the Western Australian Legislative Assembly from February 2005 to March 2021, representing the electorates of Stirling (2005–2008), Blackwood-Stirling (2008–2013), and Warren-Blackwood (2013–2021). He was leader of the Western Australia Nationals from 2013 to 2016.

== Biography ==
=== Early life ===
Redman was born on 16 April 1963 in the Perth suburb of Subiaco. He has a Bachelor of Science majoring in Agriculture and a post graduate diploma in Education.

=== Career ===
Prior to entering politics he was a teacher, principal of the Western Australian College of Agriculture in Denmark and businessman. He is married to Marie Redman and they have two children: Ben and Alysha.

Winning preselection for the National Party after the retirement of the sitting member Monty House, Redman retained the seat of Stirling for his party at the 2005 state election. Following Stirling's abolition, he won the new seat of Blackwood-Stirling at the 2008 state election.

The Western Australian election, held on 6 September 2008, resulted in a hung parliament after a swing away from the incumbent Labor Party.

On 14 September 2008, the National Party, for which Redman had been re-elected as an MP, agreed to support the Liberal Party as a minority government. Redman along with two other Nationals, including leader Brendon Grylls and deputy leader Terry Waldron, were appointed to Cabinet on 23 September 2008.

Redman served as Minister for Agriculture and Food; Forestry; and Minister Assisting the Minister for Education from 23 September 2008 to 14 December 2010. He then served as Minister for Agriculture and Food; Forestry; and Minister for Corrective Services until 29 June 2012, when he became the Minister for Housing.

At the 2013 state election, Redman won the realigned and renamed seat of Warren-Blackwood. He became Leader of the WA Nationals in December 2013. Redman was also appointed Minister of Regional Development and Lands, taking on the responsibility of overseeing the Royalties for Regions program. He resigned from the leadership in August 2016 and was replaced by his predecessor, Brendon Grylls. Redman became the first WA Nationals leader not to lead his party to an election since Henry Maley, who served in 1922–23, when the party was known as the Country Party.

Political offices
Preceded by Kim Chance	Minister for Agriculture and Food; 2008–2013	Succeeded by Ken Baston
Preceded by Kim Chance	Minister for Forestry; 2008–2013	Succeeded by Mia Davies
Preceded by Brendon Grylls	Minister for Regional Development; 2013–2017	Succeeded by Alannah MacTiernan
Preceded by Brendon Grylls	Minister for Lands; 2013–2017	Succeeded by Ben Wyatt
Parliament of Western Australia
Preceded by Monty House	Member for Stirling; 2005–2008	District abolished
New district	Member for Blackwood-Stirling; 2008–2013	District abolished
New district	Member for Warren-Blackwood; 2013–2021	Succeeded by Jane Kelsbie
Party political offices
Preceded by Brendon Grylls	Leader of the National Party of Western Australia; 2013–2016	Succeeded by Brendon Grylls
